= RIS: Delitti Imperfetti season 2 =

RIS: Delitti Imperfetti
- Season 2
- No. of episodes: 16

Release
- Original network: Canale 5
- Original release: January 9 – February 20, 2006

Season chronology
- ← Previous; Season 1 Next → Season 3

The second season of the police procedural drama RIS Delitti Imperfetti was originally broadcast between January 9 and February 20, 2006, on Canale 5.

== Plot ==
A new arrival in the RIS: it is Lieutenant Giorgia Levi, a criminologist psychologist hired to trace a psychological profile of the serial bomber. Meanwhile, the Bomb Man aims higher and higher: he kills Lieutenant Anna Giordano, poisoning her with a bracelet. The desperation of Captain Riccardo Venturi, who was having an affair with the girl, and the determination of the RIS men lead to the arrest of the serial killer, who however denies involvement in the murders. But the truth is burning: the arrested is not the Bomb Man, but his twin brother; the two had been separated at birth and neither knew of the other's existence. The hunt for the Bomb Man ends, or so it seems, at Borgo Val di Taro, on top of a dam from which the Bomb Man throws himself. But the body is not found: Venturi cannot believe in the man's death and stubbornly throws himself in search of him, even ending up on leave. Eventually, however, the captain manages to prove that the Bomb Man is alive and that he was saved via a special silicone vest.. Back on duty, the captain resumes the hunt for the bomb, which culminates in a violent firefight, where the twin of the serial killer is killed and Venturi himself is wounded. Relieved of his post, he will still manage to foil the latest attack and capture the Bomb Man. Naturally, around the central plot revolve sub-plots that speak of crimes, rape, serial murders, satanic crimes, suicides, robberies and kidnappings. In this season, particular space will be given to the character of Venturi and in one episode he will also discover himself atheist (The Last Greeting). In the meantime, Martinelli's struggle against the factory that made his father sick continues and a love is born between Martinelli himself and the new arrival Giorgia Levi. The story between Davide and Francesca De Biase ends when she decides to go and take care of her legs and study in the United States.

== Cast ==
=== Main ===
- Lorenzo Flaherty as Captain Riccardo Venturi
- Nicole Grimaudo as Lieutenant Anna Giordano (episodes 1-4)
- Filippo Nigro as Lieutenant Fabio Martinelli
- Stefano Pesce as Lieutenant Davide Testi
- Ugo Dighero as Sergeant Vincenco De Biase
- Gea Lionello as Dr. Claudia Morandi, ME
- Paolo Maria Scalondro as Captain Eduardo Rocchi
- Leonardo Treviglio as Luca Grassi
- Romina Mondello as Lieutenant Giorgia Levi

=== Recurring ===
- Giulia Michelini as Francesca De Biase (episodes 3, 10 & 15)
- Nino D' Agata as General Giacomo Tosi (episodes 1, 3-5, 11-14)

== Episodes ==
No. overall	No. in season	Title	Directed by	Written by	Original release date	Italy viewers (millions)
13	1	"Dumb Witness"	Alexis Sweet	Paolo Marchesini & Barbara Petronio & Leonardo Valenti	January 9, 2006	N/A
General Tosi introduces the new arrival to Captain Riccardo Venturi: Lieutenant Giorgia Levi from the RIS of Cagliari, a psychologist specializing in serial killer profiles. Giorgia will support the Parma RIS teamin the case of bombs. Finally the man with the bombs has a face: the one filmed by the cameras of the supermarket where he met Venturi and where in extremis the RIS avoided a massacre. Levi decides to restart from the tapes, hoping to find a message from the insane criminal. A blurry image of a keychain in the man's hand leads her and Marshal De Biase to a car rental, where they find a letter to Venturi containing a single obsessive phrase. Giorgia tries to decipher the message as if it were a riddle. Meanwhile, the bomb man places something in the car of Lieutenant Anna Giordano, the colleague Venturi is in love with. Anna is sad because she feels that Riccardo is trying to avoid her. The case Testi works on turns out to be the same one that engages Venturi, Martinelli and captain Edoardo Rocchi of the territorial, and sees the witness of a murder as the protagonist: she is a young Moldavian, Anya, hospitalized in shock in hospital. The girl witnessed the murder of a well-known pimp, Giacomo Greco, which took place in her apartment. Rocchi wants to arrest her because he finds her guilty, but Venturi subjects her to a special test which confirms that Anya has only witnessed a murder. The truth turns out to be much more uncomfortable: the killer is Anya's mother, who tried to save her daughter from the world of prostitution and killed both Greco and Sergio Bonezzi, who was also involved in the gang. Meanwhile, Levi, anagramming the sentence written by the man of the bombs, came to decode a name: Anna Giordano. Anna is about to start her car, when Venturi joins her to explain his strange behavior. The conversation between the two saves both: just at that moment a phone call from Martinelli warns Venturi of the powerful device that is about to blow them up. Note: First appearance of captain Eduardo Rocchi, Luca Grassi and lieutenant Giorgia Levi. Appearance of general Giacomo Tosi.
14	2	"Without Suspicion"	Alexis Sweet	Barbara Petronio & Leonardo Valenti & Vinicio Canton	January 9, 2006	6.40
General Tosi introduces the new arrival to Captain Riccardo Venturi: Lieutenant Giorgia Levi from the RIS of Cagliari, a psychologist specializing in serial killer profiles. Giorgia will support the Parma RIS teamin the case of bombs. Finally the man with the bombs has a face: the one filmed by the cameras of the supermarket where he met Venturi and where in extremis the RIS avoided a massacre. Levi decides to restart from the tapes, hoping to find a message from the insane criminal. A blurry image of a keychain in the man's hand leads her and Marshal De Biase to a car rental, where they find a letter to Venturi containing a single obsessive phrase. Giorgia tries to decipher the message as if it were a riddle. Meanwhile, the bomb man places something in the car of Lieutenant Anna Giordano, the colleague Venturi is in love with. Anna is sad because she feels that Riccardo is trying to avoid her. The case Testi works on turns out to be the same one that engages Venturi, Martinelli and captain Edoardo Rocchi of the territorial, and sees the witness of a murder as the protagonist: she is a young Moldavian, Anya, hospitalized in shock in hospital. The girl witnessed the murder of a well-known pimp, Giacomo Greco, which took place in her apartment. Rocchi wants to arrest her because he finds her guilty, but Venturi subjects her to a special test which confirms that Anya has only witnessed a murder. The truth turns out to be much more uncomfortable: the killer is Anya's mother, who tried to save her daughter from the world of prostitution and killed both Greco and Sergio Bonezzi, who was also involved in the gang. Meanwhile, Levi, anagramming the sentence written by the man of the bombs, came to decode a name: Anna Giordano. Anna is about to start her car, when Venturi joins her to explain his strange behavior. The conversation between the two saves both: just at that moment a phone call from Martinelli warns Venturi of the powerful device that is about to blow them up.
15	3	"Guilty or Innocent"	Alexis Sweet	Vinicio Canton & Barbara Petronio & Leonardo Valenti	January 11, 2006	6.75
A well-known entrepreneur from the Province of Cuneo is found dead in his swimming pool, drowned. The investigations point towards suicide, but the analysis of the traces will lead the carabinieri on the trail of the 22-year-old son, whom the father considered only incapable. A new specialist will arrive at the RIS: Lieutenant Anna Giordano, a computer engineer who will be assigned to the fingerprint department. Relations with Vincenzo De Biase, with whom he will have to work together, are not the best at first, but after solving an investigation into a disabled girl who was suffocated in an arson in a pub, the two begin to go further. 'agreement. Note: Appearance of Francesca De Biase and general Giacomo Tosi.
16	4	"The Hour of Poison"	Alexis Sweet	Vinicio Canton & Barbara Petronio & Leonardo Valenti	January 11, 2006	6.30
While Venturi investigates the kidnapping of a child; meanwhile, Testi and De Biase investigate the death of a convict, killed in a sex club while enjoying the striptease of a girl named Mara. Venturi discovers that the idea of the kidnapping of the child is the latter's uncle, who killed her brother-in-law to deceive his niece. Instead, Testi and De Biase discover that Mara's colleague killed a convict in revenge. After the case, Testi and Mara end up in bed together. On her birthday, Anna is the victim of yet another assassination attempt on the bomb man, who manages to kill her in the captain's arms: the bomb man sends her a message pretending to be Venturi, and sends her a pack with a carousel music box Note: Last appearance of lieutenant Anna Giordano. Appearance of general Giacomo Tosi.
17	5	"Last Salute"	Alexis Sweet	Sara Mosetti & Barbara Petronio & Leonardo Valenti	January 16, 2006	6.51
Venturi, destroyed by Anna's death, does not feel like following the investigation and goes to Venetoto investigate the disappearance of a parish priest. In the meantime, in the Parma office, De Biase and Testi are in charge of analyzing the crime scene and the objects that Anna touched before she died, according to the coroner, in fact, contact with a poisoned object is the cause of her death. In Veneto Venturi discovers that the missing priest is dead, and with Vincenzo's help he manages to solve the case: at first the suspicions fall on a boy who was angry with the parish priest because the latter had made her pregnant. his partner, but later it turns out that the two have only quarreled violently, but the death of the priest is not a murder but a terrible misfortune; in fact the priest climbs into the turret to repair the bell, but the railing breaks and he falls into the void. Note: Appearance of general Giacomo Tosi.
18	6	"Deception of the Science"	Alexis Sweet	Sara Mosetti & Barbara Petronio & Leonardo Valenti	January 16, 2006	6.20
A sixty year old is found dead in the Adda riverwrapped in the plastic bag the RIS suspecting his wife, but the latter is found dead. Venturi returns to the place where Anna died where the glass fragments of the music box that Anna dropped to the ground before dying are found, on the object there could be the footprints of the man who killed Anna. Meanwhile, Levi discovers that the murderer of the spouses is the son who killed his father because he had had an affair with his girlfriend. Venturi discovers that the shards of glass he seeks are on his clothes, stuck as he held the lifeless body of the woman he loved in his arms, so the captain feels guilty for contaminating the crime scene. Once the pieces and footprints have been reconstructed, Venturi has no doubts: it was Luca Grassi who killed Anna. Vincenzo finds a message on the answering machine from which the SMS for Anna left and it was recorded after Luca Grassi's arrest, so he can't be the killer. Analyzing the fingerprints again, he notes that Grassi's is a mirror image of the one found on the music box: only itwins monozygotic have specular footprints. Luca Grassi has a brother and he is Anna's real killer.
19	7	"Dead Beauty"	Alexis Sweet	Paolo Marchesini & Francesco Balletta	January 23, 2006	6.57
A girl with whom Testi was having an affair is found dead strangled in her home and Testi is at first suspected of murder, but in reality the culprit is the owner of the club that the girl frequented. Meanwhile Martinelli and Levi deal with a case of a tango instructor who died in a suspicious way: the suspicions fall on the jealous wife, but things went very differently. At the end of the investigation Giorgia and Fabio end up making love. Venturi continues to investigate Anna's death and, thanks to a trap set thanks to the newspapers, they are able to hear the voice of the real bomb man, Luca Grassi's twin brother.
20	8	"The Trap"	Alexis Sweet	Paolo Marchesini & Francesco Balletta	January 23, 2006	N/A
In the bedroom of a residence, a mature university professor has sexual intercourse with a very young student of hers, who rides in the position of the Amazon. The footage lingers on the woman's giant breasts, until she has an orgasm. The boy ejaculates and the teacher leans down on him to kiss him. Outside, in the pouring rain, a man smokes one cigarette after another: he is the professor's husband, aware of the betrayal in progress, but unable to act. The next day, the student is found dead. The woman had long had a clandestine relationship with the boy and the carabinieri at first hypothesize that she got rid of him due to growing suspicions of her husband and son. The latter turns out to be the boy's killer, motivated by the will to punish the pair of lovers. Meanwhile, the Ris keep Luca Grassi under surveillance, using him as "bait" to capture his twin brother, the real bomb man. The two brothers meet in the middle of a very high dam. When the Ris and the men of the Territorial arrive on the spot, the bomb man has no escape and decides to throw himself into the void. Will he really be dead?
21	9	"The Murder Madness: Part 1"	Alexis Sweet	Paolo Marchesini & Barbara Petronio & Leonardo Valenti	January 30, 2006	6.64
A man is found charred in the trunk of a car driven by a thief. This is a university professor who was stabbed and then burned. RIS investigate what happened. Shortly thereafter, a drug addict is also found stabbed dead and her face half charred. On the same day a man is found dead with the same technique and the same burn.
22	10	"The Murder Madness: Part 2"	Alexis Sweet	Paolo Marchesini & Barbara Petronio & Leonardo Valenti	January 30, 2006	6.34
Two pupils of the first victim are found dead and Venturi discovers that the serial killer is the colleague of the first victim. In the meantime, the public prosecutor wants to dismiss the case of the man with the bombs, certain that he died when he threw himself from the dam into the void, but Riccardo does not rest easy also because his body has not been found. Note: Appearance of Francesca De Biase.
23	11	"The Crossfire"	Alexis Sweet	Barbara Petronio & Leonardo Valenti & Laura Nucilli	February 6, 2006	6.82
A supermarket robbery went wrong: a security guard and a robber died and the second thug was injured. The RIS investigate what happened, discovering that it was a robber who killed his accomplice and then ran away with the stolen goods. The robbers' den is found with the last two robbers killed and it turns out that the woman from the supermarket, their accomplice, then killed the wounded robber to escape with the money. Meanwhile, De Biase and Martinelli follow the case of the death of a model killed by an electric shock. Testi answers a phone call from Martinelli's mother and is forced to inform his colleague of the death of his long-ill father. Note: Appearance of general Giacomo Tosi.
24	12	"The Surprise for the Captain"	Alexis Sweet	Barbara Petronio & Leonardo Valenti & Laura Nucilli	February 6, 2006	6.33
The RIS is involved in the investigation involving a young student raped in her apartment. The victim's ex-boyfriend is suspected of the rape, but during the interrogation news arrives of another assault on a 20-year-old. Venturi and Levi investigate and discover the real responsible person who, however, dies in Riccardo's office after the latter attacked him during the interrogation after the man confessed to the two violence. Meanwhile, Testi and De Biase follow the case of Placido, a man whose body was found on a bus with a smashed skull. Investigations soon lead to suspicion of the victim's two brothers, who killed him to take possession of his recent Superenalotto win. Venturi returns home to find a smiley in the bathroom. Note: Appearance of general Giacomo Tosi.
25	13	"The Obsession"	Alexis Sweet	Paolo Marchesini & Francesco Balletta	February 13, 2006	6.16
A nurse is found dead in her office half naked. Giorgia and Fabio investigate the case and discover that the culprit is another nurse who has long been in love with her colleague but rejected. Meanwhile, Venturi investigates a smile that the man with the bombs had thrown on the ground before jumping off the dam and that Riccardo found hanging in his bathroom mirror. Venturi is obsessed with the bomb man even though everyone keeps telling him that he is dead and so he has his house and office thoroughly analyzed without finding anything. General Tosi decides it is better for the captain to go on leave until he calms down. Note: Appearance of general Giacomo Tosi.
26	14	"The Devil's Hand"	Alexis Sweet	Paolo Marchesini & Francesco Balletta	February 13, 2006	5.51
The two members of a cult have been found dead and are dealing with a missing girl. Testi and Martinelli deal with the case; the latter has momentarily become captain in place of Venturi. Meanwhile, Levi and De Biase investigate a case of suicide by an accountant. Venturi returns to the dam and analyzes a piece of silicone found there. Now he has proof that the bomb man is alive, he threw himself in a silicone vest from the dam and thus survived. His colleagues do not believe him and he proves it to him by throwing himself off the dam in the same way. Note: Appearance of general Giacomo Tosi.
27	15	"The Crime in the Closed Chamber"	Alexis Sweet	Paolo Marchesini & Barbara Petronio & Leonardo Valenti	February 20, 2006	5.92
Venturi proves to his team that the bomb man did not drown at the dam. On the same day he had hidden a silicone life jacket under his jacket to get him back to the surface and hide somewhere. While the team is grappling with two murder cases, Riccardo wants to question the bomb man's twin, the only person who can bring him to him. Luca Grassi is summoned, but shortly after leaving RIS, Riccardo and Vincenzo realize that they were facing the bombing man and not his twin brother. Riccardo goes to Luca Grassi's house, but a firefight arises. When the RIS arrive they find the man killed and the captain on the ground injured. Note: Appearance of Francesca De Biase.
28	16	"The Last Test"	Alexis Sweet	Paolo Marchesini & Barbara Petronio & Leonardo Valenti	February 20, 2006	5.86
General command sends a new captain to lead the team as Venturi is too involved on the case. The team, however, disobeying the orders of the new boss, continues to investigate the murder of Grassi and proves Riccardo's innocence. The man of the bombs in fact set a trap for Venturi, he wounded him, anesthetized him and so he had time to take his brother who had been held prisoner for a long time, kill him with Riccardo's hand to put the blame on him. In the garage of the building, Riccardo finds more than a hundred bombs ready to explode, but manages to defuse them while the bomb man escapes again. The captain finds him, but during the chase, the ruthless criminal ends up with the car on top of a truck. The captain saves his life by pulling him out of the car that was about to explode. Finally the bomb man is at RIS, face to face with the captain. However, she confesses that she has planted one last bomb in a public place: it is up to the RIS to find it before it makes a massacre. Analyzing the clothes and the body of the bomb man they understand that the bomb is in the fountain where Anna died. Arriving on the spot they find a bag which is empty, it contains only the last message for the captain. The bomb man wants to try to commit suicide, but Riccardo manages to prevent it. Analyzing the clothes and the body of the bomb man they understand that the bomb is in the fountain where Anna died. Arriving on the spot they find a bag which is empty, it contains only the last message for the captain. The bomb man wants to try to commit suicide, but Riccardo manages to prevent it. Analyzing the clothes and the body of the bomb man they understand that the bomb is in the fountain where Anna died. Arriving on the spot they find a bag which is empty, it contains only the last message for the captain. The bomb man wants to try to commit suicide, but Riccardo manages to prevent it. Note: Last appearance of Luca Grassi. Last regular appearance of lieutenant Fabio Martinelli.
