= RIS: Delitti Imperfetti season 1 =

RIS: Delitti Imperfetti
- Season 1
- No. of episodes: 12

Release
- Original network: Canale 5
- Original release: January 12 – February 16, 2005

Season chronology
- Next → Season 2

The first season of the police procedural drama RIS Delitti Imperfetti was originally broadcast between January 12 and February 16, 2005 on Canale 5.

== Plot ==
In the first season, Captain Riccardo Venturi's men must face a sadistic and intelligent bomber who builds miniature bombs by hiding them in various everyday objects. From the very first episodes, for some strange reason, "the Bomb Man" (so nicknamed by the media) targets Captain Venturi, trying to hit him by inserting a bomb into an energy drink. He will be able to get to the heart of the RIS like no one had ever done before, sending a bomb hidden inside an artifact. At the same time the RIS of Parmadeals with "simpler cases" such as serial killings, "family crimes", rapes, kidnappings and cases inspired by the recent Italian news. Along with the story there are also subplots that see the private life of the members of the team as protagonist: the death of Venturi's parents, the rape of Anna, the accident of Francesca De Biase, the daughter of Marshal Vincenzo De Biase, and love relationships among colleagues. The series culminates with the latest bomb that the bomber sends to the RIS to try to kill Anna. But Venturi's intervention at the last moment saves her by destroying the laboratory.

== Cast ==
- Lorenzo Flaherty as Captain Riccardo Venturi
- Nicole Grimaudo as Lieutenant Anna Giordano
- Filippo Nigro as Lieutenant Fabio Martinelli
- Stefano Pesce as Lieutenant Davide Testi
- Ugo Dighero as Sergeant Vincenco De Biase
- Giulia Michelini as Francesca De Biase
- Gea Lionello as Dr. Claudia Morandi, ME
- Giamperdo Judica as Lieutenant Bruno Corsini
- Nino D' Agata as General Giacomo Tosi

== Episodes ==
No. overall	No. in season	Title	Directed by	Written by	Original release date	Italy viewers (millions)
1	1	"Resistless Test"	Alexis Sweet	Barbara Petronio & Leonardo Valenti & Vinicio Canton	January 12, 2005	8.33
A well-known entrepreneur from the Province of Cuneo is found dead in his swimming pool, drowned. The investigations point towards suicide, but the analysis of the traces will lead the carabinieri on the trail of the 22-year-old son, whom the father considered only incapable. A new specialist will arrive at the RIS: Lieutenant Anna Giordano, a computer engineer who will be assigned to the fingerprint department. Relations with Vincenzo De Biase, with whom he will have to work together, are not the best at first, but after solving an investigation into a disabled girl who was suffocated in an arson in a pub, the two begin to go further. 'agreement. Note: First appearance of captain Riccardo Venturi, lieutenant Anna Giordano, lieutenant Fabio Martinelli, lieutenant Davide Testi, sergeant Vincenco De Biase, Francesca De Biase, dr. Claudia Morandi, lieutenant Bruno Corsini and general Giacomo Tosi
2	2	"Accident"	Alexis Sweet	Barbara Petronio & Leonardo Valenti & Vinicio Canton	January 12, 2005	7.38
A child on a bicycle is hit by a motorcyclist during a clandestine race. De Biase and Testi witness the accident and the latter is accused of injuries by a motorcyclist he had chased. At the same time a candle explodes in the hands of a parish priest causing him to lose his limb.
3	3	"Analysis of Murder"	Alexis Sweet	Barbara Petronio & Leonardo Valenti & Mimmo Rafele & Nicola Ravera Rafele	January 19, 2005	6.35
During a road check, Captain Corsini is involved in a shooting in which a carabiniere and an innocent victim are killed. Corsini goes into a coma and the investigations focus on three drivers of a security door suspected of being robbers and the assassins of the carabiniere. But, once tracked down to a cottage, they are found shot dead and the money missing. Meanwhile, in every crime scene, the RIS find traces of snakeskin. Meanwhile, the RIS receives an intimidating message from the bomb man: "Next time it will be much worse ...".
4	4	"Challenge for the Captain"	Alexis Sweet	Barbara Petronio & Leonardo Valenti & Mimmo Rafele & Nicola Ravera Rafele	January 19, 2005	5.88
A girl has gone missing and another boy is found dead and with a stick stuck in his body; apparently two separate cases, they will prove to be connected to each other: investigating the cases, it is discovered that the murdered boy raped the missing girl, under the eyes of two friends. Meanwhile, Testi deals with the death of a robber, who fell from the third floor while attempting a theft: the testimonies of the hosts reveal that the robber shot and then fell downstairs. Meanwhile, the bomb man strikes again, putting a device inside a toy gun and causing the loss of a hand to a child who had found it by accident playing in the park. De Biase reassembles the bomb that exploded in the child's hand and discovers that Venturi's name is engraved on the envelope that contained the explosive.
5	5	"Blackmail: Part 1"	Alexis Sweet	Daniele Cesarano & Paolo Marchesini	January 25, 2005	N/A
A taxi driver, executive, and real estate agent, who have no connection with each other, are murdered with a nine-caliber pistol and, at the crime scene, the killer leaves poker playing cards. The RIS find a note at the last crime scene containing a ransom note: if it is not fulfilled, the killer will continue to kill.
6	6	"Blackmail: Part 2"	Alexis Sweet	Daniele Cesarano & Paolo Marchesini	January 25, 2005	N/A
Martinelli commits an imprudence risking to be killed by the killer, who runs away while the others of the RIS reach the colleague making sure of his condition. Meanwhile, the killer makes another victim and increases the price of the ransom: if it is not paid into his bank account by 6 pm, yet another murder will take place. Meanwhile, the alleged Bomb Man is hastily arrested, but Venturi is not convinced.
7	7	"Hidden Truth"	Alexis Sweet	Paolo Marchesini & Massimo Bavastro & Barbara Petronio & Leonardo Valenti	February 2, 2005	6.82
A 22-year-old girl is found in an overdose coma: the RIS try to track down her drug dealer friends, but it turns out that they have been murdered. The investigation focuses on a "small chemist" who makes drugs and supplied them to one of the two drug dealers, but not getting paid. Meanwhile, a nurse is found dead in her home: the main suspect is a prisoner, arrested by De Biase several years earlier for an armed robbery, who has an affair with the nurse found dead.
8	8	"Beautiful Night"	Alexis Sweet	Paolo Marchesini & Massimo Bavastro & Barbara Petronio & Leonardo Valenti	February 2, 2005	6.50
A girl is found inside the trunk of her car, raped and strangled. The RIS set off on the trail of the maniac who had lured the girl over the internet. Anna manages to convince the man to have a date during which she risks being raped too, but Venturi arrives in time to save her. It turns out that Anna, at eighteen, had been raped. The Bomb Man puts a bomb in a mineral supplement for Venturi, but it explodes in another person's hand.
9	9	"Blood Ties"	Alexis Sweet	Stefano Bises & Paolo Marchesini	February 9, 2005	6.88
A girl from Tricase, only a few weeks pregnant, is found with her head smashed by seven blows from a blunt object in an abandoned cottage. The first accused will be the victim's boy, but the hypothesis will be discarded when he is found hanged from a tree in a wood. Meanwhile, vials of morphine and opiates are stolen in a hospital. Immediately the blame falls on a nurse, but the hypothesis will be wrong: the story will be a source of tension between Davide and Francesca. Meanwhile, in Tricase, it was discovered that the killer is related to the victim and that the crime is connected to a murder that took place eighteen years earlier. To go back togenetic isolate. Even Venturi will find it hard to believe his eyes when he discovers the unimaginable truth. Traces of saliva with the captain's DNA are found on the adhesive tape of an Unabomber device.
10	10	"The Unexpected"	Alexis Sweet	Stefano Bises & Paolo Marchesini	February 9, 2005	7.15
A little girl named Martina is found dead in a wood near a stuffed animal. The autopsy will establish that she died from a broken skull. The pedophile had crushed her head against the ground. The particularly violent story will be a source of tension between Venturi and Martinelli who, unwittingly, will destroy a vital evidence to accuse the boyfriend of the victim's sister. At the end of the episode the man with the bombs sends an explosive book to the prosecutor to kill the prosecutor Di Maio, but Venturi manages to save the man. The bomb squads defuse the bomb, finally they will be able to find out which trigger the bomb uses.
11	11	"The Revenge"	Alexis Sweet	Francesco Balletta & Barbara Petronio & Leonardo Valenti	February 16, 2005	7.88
A robber kills a jeweler with a pistol during a robbery that ended badly. The robber could be the same one who hit Francesca ten years earlier. Martinelli resigns because he believes that Venturi treats him as an object and not as a person. The trigger that the bomb man uses to detonate bombs is discovered: it is a bulb for old cameras. And only fifteen people in Parma collect them.
12	12	"The Final Challenge"	Alexis Sweet	Francesco Balletta & Barbara Petronio & Leonardo Valenti	February 16, 2005	8.36
Venturi and De Biase are miraculously alive. The house of the bomb man was a trap, thirteen bombs were connected and ready to explode. Finally, the identity of the man of the bombs is known: his name is Mario Samueli but, in the cellar, inside a shower stall, the body of the latter will be found poisoned with herbicide. During the autopsy, Morandi finds a note inside the man's stomach for the captain with the words: "July 24, 2004 .... who will you lose today?". It's a clear reference to the deaths of Venturi's parents and Lt. Anna Giordano. The final challenge has begun and, after having defused a bomb in a shopping center and one in a school, the carabinieri realize that the next bomb is inside the RIS. During the inspection of Mario Samueli's home, in fact, they had found a small radio where, inside, there was the bomb. Venturi manages to save Lieutenant Giordano at the last second, but the labs are destroyed. At the site of the explosion, however, they find a smiley face and Venturi figures out who to look for. He shows De Biase the surveillance tapes of the mall and points to a man he had met on their way inside. That man had a keychain with a smiley face. He shows De Biase the surveillance tapes of the shopping center and points to a man he had met on their way inside. That man had a keychain with a smiley face. He shows De Biase the surveillance tapes of the shopping center and points to a man he had met on their way inside. That man had a keychain with a smiley face. Note: Last appearance of lieutenant Bruno Corsini. Last regular appearance of Francesca De Biase and general Giacomo Tossi.
