= RIS: Delitti Imperfetti season 3 =

RIS: Delitti Imperfetti
- Season 3
- No. of episodes: 16

Release
- Original network: Canale 5
- Original release: January 15 – February 20, 2007

Season chronology
- ← Previous; Season 2 Next → Season 4

The third season of the police procedural drama RIS Delitti Imperfetti was originally broadcast between January 15 and February 20, 2007 on Canale 5.

== Plot ==
Martinelli is promoted to captain and transferred to Messina. To make up for the absence, however, Francesca De Biase will arrive who, with her hilarity, will bring a breath of freshness to the Parma laboratories. Riccardo Venturi, after the loss of Anna, has become even more methodical and precise in his work. The Man of the Bombs, meanwhile, is in prison and is sentenced to life imprisonment and a regime of solitary confinement: however, it will be discovered that the affair is far from over. An anonymous package arrives at the RIS for Captain Venturi where, inside, kept in a box, there is a woman's finger recently amputated. Thanks to the ring, the group will go back to the victim and, once they arrive at the inspection in the woman's house, a DVD will be foundfor the captain. Inside is a video of a woman tied to a cot, gagged and forced to undergo hallucinating torture. Venturi thinks he's a serial killer and he is proved right when, thanks to the analysis of a larva found in the victim's house, they arrive in a wood and find the buried corpses of two different women: one already reduced to a skeleton and another recently dead. Scientists will understand that there is a new serial killer out there and that he has started a personal challenge with Captain Venturi, emulating the bomb man. During the series Venturi will have an affair with a journalist but, the latter, will be kidnapped and killed by the new serial killer. The autopsy leaves no doubt; the serial lets women die of starvation, in the most atrocious way possible, between torture and amputations in a former psychiatric hospital. The same serial will send a bomb package to Levi which, however, will explode in Venturi's hands, forcing him into a coma and leaving him with a serious problem in his hand that prevents him from keeping objects in balance. The new killer will even go to visit the captain while he is in the hospital. In the end it turns out that the serial killer is the psychiatrist who drew up the psychological profile of the man of the bombs: Carlo Vasari. It turns out that the man was the brother of a lesbian girl accused of killing his girlfriend with a tripod. Venturi had dealt with the case and had the girl arrested despite the fact that the real culprit was the brother who wanted to "punish" his sister's girlfriend for being an adulteress. Once arrested, Anna Maria Orazi (this is her sister's name) had had a psychic crisis and had been hospitalized in a psychiatric hospital (the same where the serial killer keeps his victims prisoner) where, refusing food, she was allowed to die of hardship. Vasari, before being discovered, kidnaps Francesca and keeps her prisoner first in a room of a country cottage and then, after the girl's awakening, in a labyrinth cave after having poisoned her with botulinum. In a fight with Venturi, Vasari is wounded by Marshal De Biase with a gunshot. Taken to the hospital he will go into a coma and, upon awakening, he will confess the place of Francesca's imprisonment to the man of the bombs before committing suicide in the hospital with a knife. L' Man of the Bombs will escort Venturi to the place where Francesca is but will escape and find death at the hands of Davide. Venturi goes down inside the cave and with his disabled hand breaks the unbreakable glass that separates him from Francesca and injects her with an antidote to the Botox that makes her wake up. Completely injured by the glass and ropes, Venturi manages to save little Francesca and take her to the hospital. The series ends with General Tosi who warns Venturi: if the problem in his hand is not solved, he will be forced to give the Venturi manages to save little Francesca and take her to the hospital. The series ends with General Tosi who warns Venturi: if the problem in his hand is not solved, he will be forced to give the Venturi manages to save little Francesca and take her to the hospital. The series ends with General Tosi who warns Venturi: if the problem in his hand is not solved, he will be forced to give thepermanent leave . Naturally, the simpler investigations taken from Italian news cases revolve around the history of the serial, such as crimes, serial rapists, kidnappings, armed robberies and "family murders".

== Cast ==
=== Main ===
- Lorenzo Flaherty as Captain Riccardo Venturi
- Romina Mondello as Lieutenant Giorgia Levi
- Stefano Pesce as Lieutenant Davide Testi
- Ugo Dighero as Sergeant Vincenco De Biase
- Giulia Michelini as Sergeant Francesca De Biase
- Gea Lionello as Dr. Claudia Morandi, ME
- Paolo Maria Scalondro as Captain Eduardo Rocchi
- Micaela Ramazzotti as Sara Nelli

=== Recurring ===
- Filippo Nigro as Captain Fabio Martinelli (episodes 1, 8 & 16)
- Nino D' Agata as General Giacomo Tosi (entire season)
- Leonardo Terviglio as Luca Grassi (episode 1)

== Episodes ==
No. overall	No. in season	Title	Directed by	Written by	Original release date	Italy viewers (millions)
29	1	"See You Soon, Captain"	Alexis Sweet	Filippo Gentili & Leonardo Gentili	January 15, 2007	5.84
A jewelry store robbery ends in blood with the death of one security guard and the wounding of another. The Scientific Investigations Department is called upon to put a face to the two robbers. During the investigation Giorgia Levi was seriously injured. At the same time, in Bologna, Venturi participates in the trial against the bomb man where he meets a journalist, Daria di Giacomo, who tries to interview him about the serial killer to write a book, and the psychiatrist who certified that the bomb man was perfectly able to understand and want. Meanwhile, on the outskirts of Parma, a man in a white suit and hat kidnaps a young woman. The bomb man is sentenced to life in prison. Note: First appearance of Sara Nelli. Return of Sergeant Francesca De Biase. Last appearance of Luca Grassi. Appearance of captain Fabio Martinelli.
30	2	"The Neighbors"	Alexis Sweet	Paolo Marchesini	January 15, 2007	5.51
A 12-year-old disappears near his home and, a few days later, a body is found at the edge of a river, wrapped in a garbage bag. The suspicions fall on the neighbor of the family, a carpenter with a hobby of photography. Meanwhile, Venturi receives a package where, inside, a human finger cut off with a scalpel and a ring is kept. After careful investigation it turns out that the limb belongs to a woman, who disappeared a few days ago. In the house where he lived they will find a DVD left by the kidnapper on which is engraved a video of a man torturing the probable victim. Through the analysis of a larva found at the place of the abduction, the RIS arrive in a poplar forest where the woman's body will be found buried underground.
31	3	"The Skin Color"	Alexis Sweet	Luca Monesi	January 16, 2007	6.14
The RIS try to discover the identity of the mysterious man who killed a woman by starving her to death. A female skeleton is also found at the crime scene to which Venturi and Giorgia try to give an identity. Francesca, meanwhile, takes an immigrant with a bloodstained shirt to the barracks. Investigations on the immigrant will lead them to the discovery of the corpse of the latter's cousin. From the autopsy, Morandi establishes that the man died of suffocation due to two lethal blows delivered with great technique and in rapid succession to the nose and trachea. The blows resulted in a blockage of breathing flows and subsequent death. De Biase and Testi will investigate the world of martial arts to find out who murdered that poor boy with such ferocity.
32	4	"The Revenge is Cold Dish"	Alexis Sweet	Sara Mosetti	January 16, 2007	5.85
RIS is called to examine an atypical crime scene in an apartment. There are in fact conspicuous presence of blood on all surfaces, but no corpse and no murder weapon. The body of the victim, a criminal offender for rape, was found on a construction site only later. The crime could be linked to a case of gang rape that took place eight years earlier. At the same time, Venturi weaves a purely physical relationship with the journalist Daria di Giacomo.
33	5	"The Woman To Be saved"	Pier Belloni	Francesco Balletta	January 22, 2007	5.52
Race against time to save the life of Daria di Giacomo who has been kidnapped by the new serial killer. Venturi will give his all before his woman dies of starvation. At the same time Vincenzo and Testi deal with the murder by stabbing of Orsola Lombardi, a psychotic. Next to the body, the carabinieri of the first intervention found a boy, Matteo, obsessive compulsive, completely covered in blood.
34	6	"The Blood Doesn't Lie"	Pier Belloni	Laura Nucilli & Paolo Marchesini	January 22, 2007	5.05
Michela Torre, a nine-year-old girl kidnapped the night before, is found by two swimmers on the banks of a river with a deep head injury that caused her to hemorrhage. Transferred to intensive care, the doctors manage to save her and the RIS start investigating to find the kidnapper. The girl suffered from Von Willebrand's disease, a rare genetic disease that one of her parents had passed on to her. But neither the father nor the mother were healthy carriers. The solution to the mystery could be hidden in complex DNA analyzes. Venturi, meanwhile, decides to question Unabomber in prison about the new serial killer, but no one agrees with him.
35	7	"Among Life and Death"	Pier Belloni	Paolo Marchesini	January 23, 2007	6.49
Venturi is seriously injured by the explosion of a bomb, which occurred in front of the house of his lover Daria, killed by the serial killer on which he and Levi are investigating. The colleague rejects General Tosi's proposal: she does not want to replace Venturi, she feels inadequate. Testi is forced to take command of the RIS, but only until the captain has recovered. Venturi is hospitalized for emergency surgery, but remains in a coma for two weeks. During his stay a man with a white mask will come to visit him in his hospital room, it is the new serial killer who raises the challenge. Vincenzo and Francesca, meanwhile, deal with the death by bleeding of a high school "bully", Maurizio, found dead by his drunk father.
36	8	"The Fear From The Crowd"	Pier Belloni	Leonardo Fasoli	January 23, 2007	5.95
Captain Fabio Martinelli returns to Parma to assist Venturi who has just undergone heart surgery. In the meantime, the charred body of the son of a mafia member of the Cosa Nostra is found in a warehouse . The second son, on the other hand, is missing, but his father does not want to help the carabinieri find him. Note: Appearance of captain Fabio Martinelli.
37	9	"The Bus"	Pier Belloni	Stefano Bises	January 30, 2007	6.40
A seventeen-year-old girl, after being savagely raped in her house, out of shame, decides to commit suicide by jumping out of the fifth floor window. During the investigation, another girl will be raped and the two cases are linked to five others. The hunt for a particularly sadistic serial rapist who uses the bus line to find girls to rape begins. Meanwhile, Venturi, just discharged from the hospital, is back on duty and tries to find out if there could be an effective link between the bomb man and the new serial killer, who emulates him. For this, through a mini-camera, he searches for relevant clues inside the cell of the serial bomber.
38	10	"Medium"	Pier Belloni	Filippo Kalomenidis	January 30, 2007	5.99
A visionary reports the death of one of her clients to Captain Rocchi and tells him to look for the body at the bottom of a lake. Indeed, after long searches by divers, the body of a woman was found inside a car. The autopsy will establish that the death was due to suffocation. Someone had pressed a sofa cushion over her mouth, blocking her airways. Meanwhile, Venturi and De Biase are desperate for what seems to be the next victim of the serial killer: a young girl shot from above, in an unspecified part of the city. They manage to find her but discover that they have been put on a red herring and, once they understand who the real next victim of the killer is, they will have a nasty surprise!
39	11	"Ready To Die"	Pier Belloni	Paolo Marchesini	February 6, 2007	6.30
Francesca De Biase ran the risk of being kidnapped by the serial killer who, failing in his intent, fled leaving him a smile identical to that used by the bomb man. The Ris investigate the scene of the attempted kidnapping to find some useful trace. Meanwhile, a chemist is found murdered at the train depot. According to information in the possession of ROS, the victim was an infiltrator in a Serbian terrorist cell that had recently threatened terrorist retaliation in Italy if their boss was not released. A race against time will begin to stop the attacks.
40	12	"Establishment, Dear Son"	Pier Belloni	Sara Mosetti	February 6, 2007	5.61
After eight years, the trial for the murder and rape of a wealthy woman found murdered in her home is about to end. Venturi, convinced by the defendant's mother, decides to reopen the case and examine all the evidence again. According to him, the investigations took place in one direction only. At the same time Vincenzo and Francesca deal with the death of a football player from an EPO overdose . Meanwhile, Levi collaborates with Dr. Vasari (the psychiatrist of the bomb man) to try to draw up a definitive psychological profile of the killer. Vasari asks the lieutenant to be able to speak with his colleague Francesca, being the only person left alive to have had contact with the killer.
41	13	"The Prisoner"	Pier Belloni	Francesco Balletta	February 13, 2007	6.48
Francesca wakes up in an unknown place. She was kidnapped by the serial killer on her way to the psychiatrist Carlo Vasari to work out a psychological profile. A race against time begins for all. The girl, in fact, risks dying of starvation like all the others.
42	14	"The African Fever"	Pier Belloni	Laura Nuccilli	February 13, 2007	6.50
General Tosi suspends Vincenzo from searching for his daughter and a new lieutenant goes in his place: Giovanni Rinaldi. The two will investigate the death of a drug courier who contracted a lethal infectious disease. During the examination of the corpse, Morandi will contract the dangerous virus. Meanwhile, it turns out that the serial killer is the psychiatrist who had drawn up the psychological profile of the man of the bombs, Carlo Vasari. After an interview with the bomb man, Venturi realizes that Francesca may be at the crime scene where the body of the companion of Vasari's sister had been found, who had accused herself of murder and then entered a state of catatonia by becoming hospitalized in a clinic and then dying of starvation (same cause of Vasari's three victims). In the house, however, there is it is only the serial killer waiting for him, who shoots Vincenzo (who had gone there before him) and engages in a fight with Venturi. But, during the fight, Venturi takes possession of the gun but loses it, following the pain in his hand due to the explosion of the bomb. Vasari takes the weapon and prepares to kill Venturi but Vincenzo, although wounded, manages to save his friend in time, wounding Vasari with a gunshot to the chest.
43	15	"Venturi's Sins"	Pier Belloni	Barbara Petronio & Leonardo Valenti	February 20, 2007	6.61
While Vasari and Vincenzo are in hospital because they are both injured, Rinaldi investigates the death of a man who went off the road with his car: it was not an accident and Venturi gives him a hand. While Giorgia and Davide must find out why Vasari made drawings of an armored gate where Francesca's hiding place would take place.
44	16	"The Time Run"	Pier Belloni	Barbara Petronio & Leonardo Valenti	February 20, 2007	6.55
Ultimate challenge. Finding little Francesca before the botulinum that injected Vasari kills her. Venturi will be forced to release the bomb man who is the only person with whom Vasari wants to talk and confess. Note: Last appearance of captain Fabio Martinelli, lieutenant Davide Testi and Sara Nelli.
