= Episodes of Squadra antimafia - Palermo oggi (first season) =

Season of television series

N°	Titolo	Original air date
1	Squadra Antimafia	31 March 2009
2	Il Gruppo Duomo	7 April 2009
3	L'Incontro	14 April 2009
4	La Talpa è Alfiere?	21 April 2009
5	Il Motoscafo	28 April 2009
6	Ivan Di Meo è la Talpa	5 May 2009

The first season of Squadra antimafia – Palermo oggi premiered on Canale 5 on 31 March 2009. The cast includes Simona Cavallari, Giulia Michelini, Claudio Gioè, Ninni Bruschetta, Silvia De Santis, Lele Vannoli, Marco Leonardi, Massimo Poggio, Vincent Riotta, Sergio Friscia, Luca Angeletti, Jacopo Cavallaro, Paolo Ricca, Claudio Castrogiovanni, Peppe Lanzetta, and Bruno Torrisi.
