= Mohamed Zouaoui =

Tunisian actor

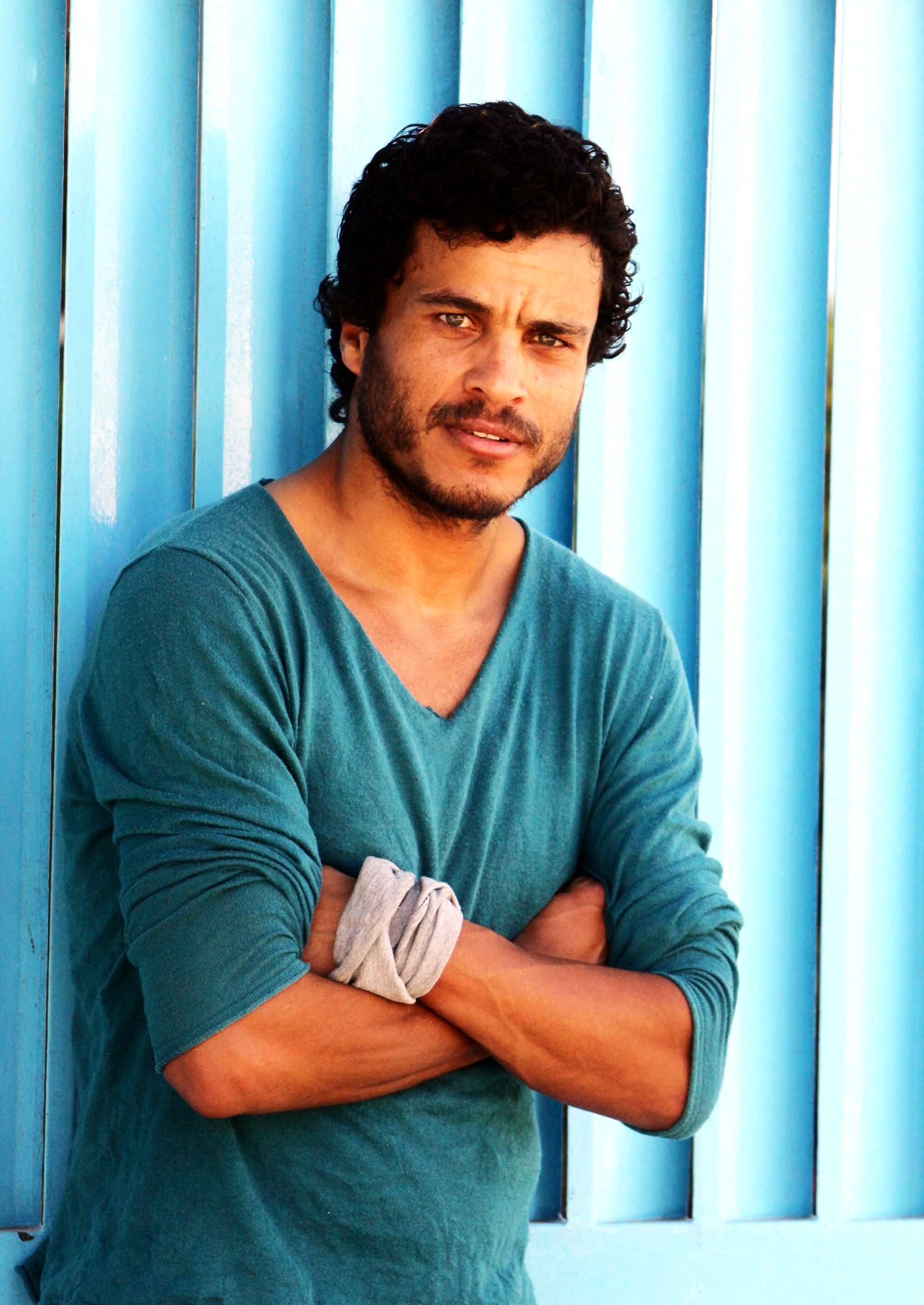
- Born: Mahdia, Tunisia
- Occupation: Actor

Mohamed Zouaoui (Arabic: محمد الزواوي), is a Tunisian-born actor living in Italy. In 2004 he made his first appearance on the television miniseries Posso chiamarti amore?. He also acted in Nassiryia - Per non dimenticare (Nasiriyah - Lest we forget), Capri, and RIS Delitti Imperfetti (Scientific Investigations Unit: Imperfect Crimes). In 2007, he acted in the miniseries Liberi di giocare. His cinema debut was the 2008 film L'ultimo pulcinella, directed by Maurizio Scapparo. In 2009 he starred in I mostri oggi, and in 2010 appeared in The Father and the Foreigner. In 2010 he acted in I fiori di Kirkuk, directed by Fariborz Kamkari. For this role he earned several awards, including the "Golden Globe" 2011 Globo d'Oro for Best New Actor.

In 2012 he starred in the independent film Carta Bianca, by Colombian director Andreas Maldonado, a film based on a true story.

Between 2014 and 2016 Zouaoui takes part in several projects including, Movies, short films, and TV series.

In 2018 he took part in the film Beirut, directed by Brad Anderson with Jon Hamm and Rosamund Pike. The film premiered at the Sundance Film Festival 2018 on January 22.

In the same year he was the absolute protagonist of the Italian-Moroccan film Catharsys or The Afina Tales of the Lost World, presented in competition in several important festivals including the Turin Film Festival and the Marrakech International Film Festival. In 2019 he starred together with Claudia Gerini in the film Burraco Fatale by Giuliana Gamba.

In 2025, he had roles in Julian Schnabel's film In the Hand of Dante and the production The First Christmas, presented by Kevin Costner for Apple TV+.

== Filmography ==
=== Cinema ===
Year	Title	Role	Director	Notes
2025	In the Hand of Dante	Barman	Julian Schnabel	
2025	The First Christmas	Joachim	David L. Cunningham	
2021	Codice Karim	Karim	Federico Alotto	Best International Actor Award
2021	Europa	Mohamed	Haider Rashid	
2021	Diversamente	Ali	Max Nardari	
2020	Burraco fatale	Nabil	Giuliana Gamba	
2019	Greeting from ISIS	Ahmed	Mehdi Elkhaoudy	
2018	Beirut	Fahmi	Brad Anderson	
2018	Catharsys or The Afina Tales	Jamal Afina	Yassine Marco Marroccu	
2018	Dead on Time	Moshin Dewar	Rish Mustaine	
2017	Noble Earth	Aladin	Ursula Grisham	
2017	Aeffetto Domino	Marco	Fabio Massa	
2016	Florence Yesterday	Role	Ursula Grisham	
2014	Amici come noi	Pusher	Enrico Lando	
2013	Carta Bianca	Kamal	Andres Arce Maldonado	
2013	Dimmelo con il cuore	Alejandro	Alfonso Ciccarelli	
2010	The Flowers of Kirkuk	Mokhtar	Fariborz Kamkari	Won Globo d'oro
2010	The Father and the Foreigner	Michel Arabesque	Ricky Tognazzi	
2009	I mostri oggi	Ali	Enrico Oldoini	
2008	L'ultimo Pulcinella	Mohamed	Maurizio Scaparro	

=== Television ===
Year	Title	Role	Director	Notes
2025	L'appartamento sold out	Osama	Giulio Manfredonia	
2023	Blanca	Ismail	Michele Soavi	Season 2
2021	Fino all'ultimo battito	Bachir	Cinzia TH Torrini	
2014	Clay's P.O.V.	Jamal	Paul Donovan	
2014	Anna e Yussef	Tahir	Cinzia TH Torrini	
2013	2020	Yanek Novak	Wojciech Jezowski	
2011	Un amore e una vendetta	Hassan	Raffaele Mertes	
2010	Capri 3	Faris	Francesca Marra	
2010	R.I.S. Roma – Delitti imperfetti	Ahmed	Fabio Tagliavia	
2010	La ladra	Hafiz	Francesco Vicario	
2009	L'ispettore Coliandro	vlad	Manetti Bros.	
2008	Don Matteo	Alì	Giulio Base	
2007	Liberi di giocare	Mohamed	Francesco Miccichè	
2006	Nassiryia - Per non dimenticare	Mohamed	Michele Soavi	
2004	Posso chiamarti amore?	Bassam	Paolo Bianchini	

=== Short films ===
Year	Title	Role	Director	Notes
2023	Blind	—	Mohamed Zouaoui	Also Director and Writer
2020	Amal	Role	Matteo Russo	
2019	The Soul	Ben	Mohamed Zouaoui	Also Director and Writer
2018	L'amore non ha religione	Role	Max Nardari	
2017	A mezzanotte	Role	Alessio Lauria	
2016	Farida	—	Mohamed Zouaoui	Also Director

== Awards and nominations ==
Year	Award	Category	Work	Result
2023	Barcelona Indie Filmmakers Fest (BARCIFF)	Best Actor	Outcast	Nominated
2023	Tulipani di Seta Nera	Rai Cinema Channel Award	Blind	Nominated
2021	Castelli Romani International Film Festival	Best International Actor	Codice Karim	{{{2}}}
2021	Mantova Lovers International Short Film Festival	Best Male Actor	Amal	{{{2}}}
2021	Reale Film Festival	Best Actor (June Award)	Attacking Rome	{{{2}}}
2021	Antakya Film Festival	Jury Prize – Best Actor	Amal	Nominated
2021	Beverly Hills Film Festival	Best Actor	Codice Karim	Nominated
2020	Phlegraean Film Festival	Phlegraean Award – Best Actor	Amal	{{{2}}}
2019	Foggia Film Festival	Special Mention	Catharsys or The Afina Tales	{{{2}}}
2019	National Film Festival Tangier	Best Male Role	Catharsys or The Afina Tales	Nominated
2018	Reale Film Festival	Best Actor (June Award)	Attacking Rome	{{{2}}}
2018	Sahar International Short Film Festival	Jury Prize	Farida	{{{2}}}
2018	Casablanca International Film Festival	Golden Corrone – Best Male Role	Catharsys or The Afina Tales	Nominated
2018	Marrakech International Film Festival	Best Actor	Catharsys or The Afina Tales	Nominated
2018	Tallinn Black Nights Film Festival	Jury Prize – Best Actor	Catharsys or The Afina Tales	Nominated
2017	Sandalia Film Festival	Best Director	Farida	{{{2}}}
2017	Sandalia Film Festival	Best Screenplay	Farida	{{{2}}}
2017	Children's Film Society Bangladesh	Jury Prize – Best Short Film	Farida	Nominated
2016	Venice Film Festival	MigrArti Prize – Best Short Film	Farida	Nominated
2013	Dubai International Film Festival	Muhr Short – Best Actor	The Deep	Nominated
2011	Globo d'oro (Italian Golden Globe)	Best Breakthrough Actor	The Flowers of Kirkuk	{{{2}}}
2010	Flaiano Prize	Best Actor	The Flowers of Kirkuk	{{{2}}}
2010	Rome Film Fest	Best Actor	The Flowers of Kirkuk	Nominated
