= Elisabetta Pellini =

Italian actress & model (born 1974)

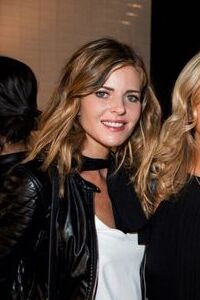
- Pellini at the 2015 Milan Fashion Week
- Born: 6 April 1974 (age 52); Italy
- Occupations: Actress; Model
- Years active: 1998–present

Elisabetta Pellini (born 6 April 1974) is an Italian actress and model. She is best known for playing Laura in the Italian TV series Le tre rose di Eva.

== Filmography ==
- Cucciolo, directed by Neri Parenti (1998)
- Il cielo in una stanza, directed by Carlo Vanzina (1999)
- Denti, directed by Gabriele Salvatores (2000)
- Amici ahrarara, directed by Franco Amurri (2001)
- Forever, directed by Alessandro Di Robilant (2003)
- Non sono io, directed by Gabriele Iacovone (2003)
- Balletto di guerra, directed by Mario Rellini (2004)
- Don't Make Any Plans for Tonight, directed by Gianluca Maria Tavarelli (2006)
- Un giorno perfetto, directed by Ferzan Özpetek (2008)
- I fiori di Kirkuk, directed by Fariborz Kamkari (2009)
- Cara, ti amo..., directed by Gian Paolo Vallati (2011)
- Il cantico di Maddalena, directed by Mauro Campiotti, (2011)
- Mi rifaccio vivo, directed by Sergio Rubini (2013)
- Midway - Tra la vita e la morte, directed by John Real (2013)
- Infernet, directed by Giuseppe Ferlito - Role: Arianna (2015)
- La mia famiglia a soqquadro, directed by Max Nardari (2017)
- Stato di ebbrezza, directed by Luca Biglione (2018)
- Diversamente, directed by Max Nardari (2021)
- Dark Matter, directed by Stefano Odorardi (2021)
- Corro da te, directed by Riccardo Milani (2022)
- Joachim and the Apocalypse, directed by Jordan River (2024)

=== Television ===
- L'ispettore Giusti, by Sergio Martino - serie TV (1999)
- Cornetti al miele, by Sergio Martino - film TV (1999)
- Il maresciallo Rocca 3, by Giorgio Capitani - serie TV (2000)
- Ricominciare- Soap opera (2000)
- Per amore per vendetta, by Mario Caiano - serie TV (2000)
- Una donna per amico 3, by Rossella Izzo - miniserie TV (2001)
- Compagni di scuola, by Tiziana Aristarco e Claudio Norza - serie TV (2001)
- Incantesimo 5, by Alessandro Cane e Leandro Castellani - serie TV (2002)
- Elisa di Rivombrosa 2, by Cinzia Th. Torrini e Stefano Alleva - serie TV (2005)
- Questa è la mia terra, by Raffaele Mertes - miniserie TV (2006)
- Un ciclone in famiglia 2, by Carlo Vanzina - miniserie televisiva (2006)
- Eravamo solo mille, by Stefano Reali - miniserie televisiva (2006)
- Distretto di polizia 7, by Alessandro Capone e Davide Dapporto - serie TV (2007)
- Un medico in famiglia 5, by Ugo Fabrizio Giordani, Isabella Leoni ed Elisabetta Marchetti - serie TV (2007)
- Senza via d'uscita - Un amore spezzato, by Giorgio Serafini - miniserie TV (2007)
- Rex, by Marco Serafini - serie TV (2008)
- Il commissario De Luca, by Antonio Frazzi - miniserie TV - Episode: Indagine non autorizzata (2008)
- Il mistero del lago, by Marco Serafini - film TV (2009)
- Piloti, by Celeste Laudisio - Sit-com (2009)
- Un coccodrillo per amico, by Francesca Marra - film TV (2009)
- Le cose che restano, byi Gianluca Maria Tavarelli - miniserie TV (2009)
- Capri 3, by Dario Acocella and Francesca Marra - serie TV (2010)
- Il restauratore, by Giorgio Capitani (2011)
- Un amore e una vendetta, by Raffaele Mertes - serie TV (2011). Ruolo: Olga Bernardi.
- 6 passi nel giallo - Souvenirs, by Lamberto Bava - film TV (2012)
- Le tre rose di Eva - serie TV (2012) - Role: Laura Sommariva
- Il paese delle piccole piogge - film TV (2012)
- Rosso San Valentino, by Fabrizio Costa - serie TV (2013)
- Provaci ancora Prof 5, by Tiziana Aristarco - serie TV (2013)
- Le tre rose di Eva 2 - serie TV (2013) - Role: Laura Sommariva
- Madre, aiutami, by Gianni Lepre - miniserie TV (2014)
- Le tre rose di Eva 3 - serie TV (2014) - Role: Laura Sommariva
- Provaci ancora Prof 6, by Enrico Oldoini and Francesca Marra - serie TV (2015)
- Don Matteo 10, - Serie TV (2015)
