= Love and Vendetta =

- Italian: Un amore e una vendetta
- Directed by: Raffaele Mertes
- Starring: Anna Valle; Alessandro Preziosi; Lorenzo Flaherty
- Composer: Savio Riccardi
- Country of origin: Italy
- Original language: Italian
- No. of seasons: 1
- No. of episodes: 8

Production
- Cinematography: Mirko Fioravanti
- Running time: 120 min

Original release
- Network: Canale 5
- Release: 12 October – 23 November 2011

Love and Vendetta (Italian: Un amore e una vendetta) is an Italian television miniseries. The eight episode series aired on the Canale 5 network from 12 October through 23 November 2011, and featured Anna Valle, Alessandro Preziosi, and Lorenzo Flaherty. The series was first premiered at the 2011 Rome Fiction Fest at the Parco della Musica.

The television premiere on Canale 5 was watched by 4.4 million viewers for a 17.72% share, winning its time slot, and continuing to perform well throughout its run.

Based on the popular 2006 Argentine telenovela Montecristo (which was optioned to a number of countries, including Italy), the storyline is loosely based on The Count of Monte Cristo by Alexandre Dumas.

== Cast ==
- Anna Valle as Laura Castellani
- Alessandro Preziosi as Lorenzo Bermann/Andrea Damonte
- Lorenzo Flaherty as Marco Damiani
- Giovanni Guidelli as Paolo Bianchi
- Paolo Seganti as Luca Calligaris
- Federico Costantini as Massimiliano "Max" Bianchi
- Elisabetta Pellini as Olga Bernardi
- Ray Lovelock as Alberto Castellani
- Simona Borioni as Gabriella Bianchi
- Mohamed Zouaoui as Hassan
- Desirèe Noferini as Kadisha
- Fiorenza Marchegiani as Betta
- Giulia Elettra Gorietti as Monica
- Benedetta Massola as Stefania
- Miloud Mourad Benamara as Arab man
