= Gianni Mammolotti =

Italian cinematographer

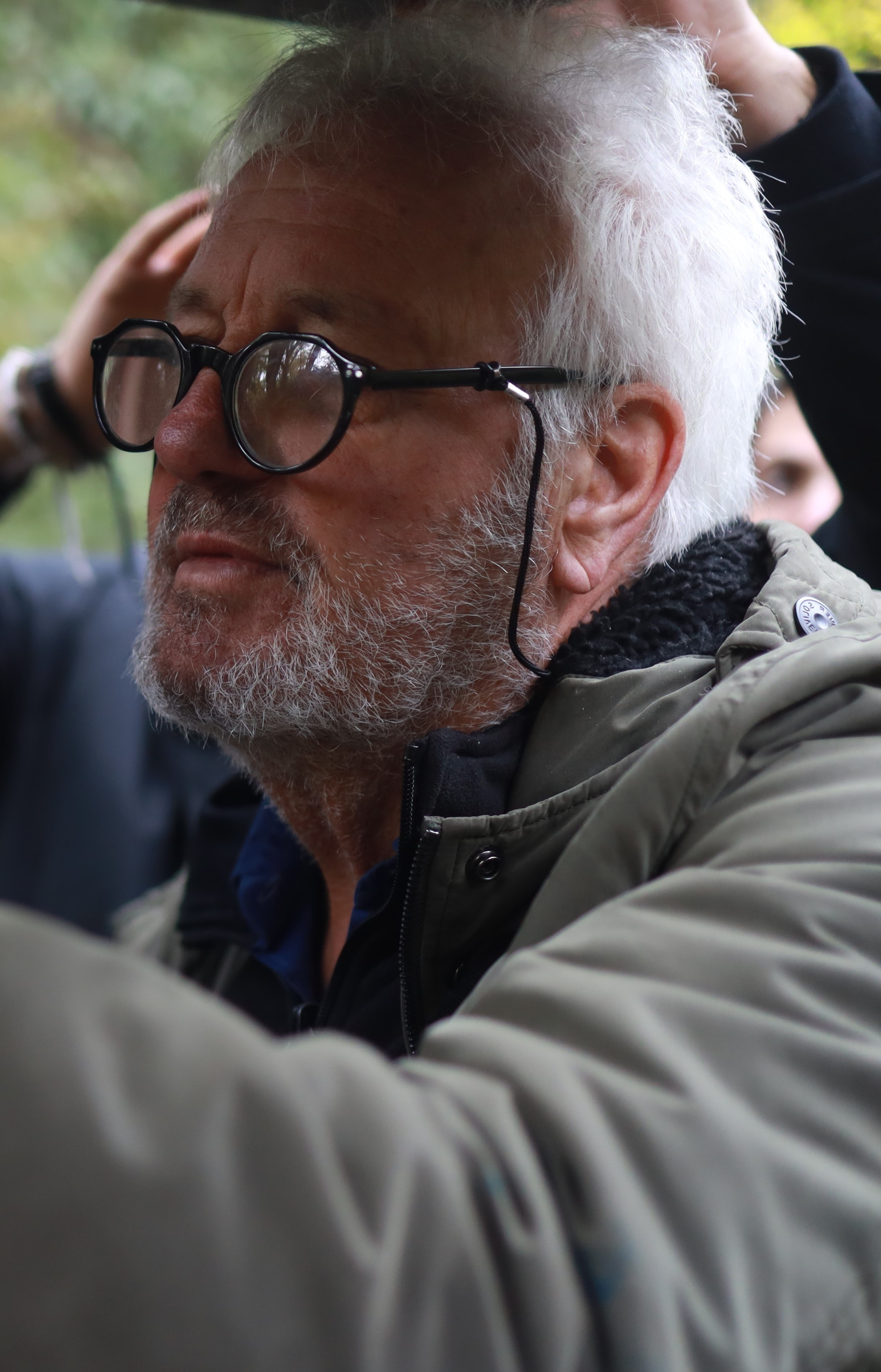
- Gianni Mammolotti in 2022
- Born: 23 January 1950 (age 76); Siena, Italy
- Occupation: Cinematographer
- Years active: 1990–present

Giovanni "Gianni" Mammolotti (born 23 January 1950) is an Italian cinematographer. He teaches Cinematography at the Centro Sperimentale di Cinematografia in Rome and is a member of A.I.C. Italian Association of Authors of Cinematographic Photography. Gianni Mammolotti has been working in film and television for over 30 years.

In 2024 Gianni Mammolotti won the award for Best Cinematography at the Terni International Film Festival for Jordan River’s film Joachim and the Apocalypse.

== Selected filmography ==
- Un metro all'alba (1990)
- Oasi (1994)
- La caccia, il cacciatore, la preda (1995)
- Empoli 1921 - Film in rosso e nero (1995)
- Una notte che piove (1995)
- Annata di pregio (1995)
- Ilona Arrives with the Rain (1996)
- L'albero dei destini sospesi (1997)
- Colpo di stadio (1998)
- Ultimo (1998)
- Lui e lei (1998)
- Il quarto re (1998)
- Ultimo - La sfida (1999)
- Una farfalla nel cuore (1999)
- Ferreri, I love you (2000)
- Un dono (2000)
- Distretto di Polizia (2000)
- Le ali della vita (2000)
- Il testimone (2001)
- Uno bianca (2001)
- St. Francis (2002)
- Doppio agguato (2003)
- Ultima pallottola (2003)
- RIS Delitti Imperfetti (2005)
- Karol: A Man Who Became Pope (2005)
- The Goodbye Kiss (2006)
- Attacco allo Stato (2006)
- Karol: The Pope, The Man (2006)
- Milano Palermo - Il ritorno (2007)
- Nassiryia - Per non dimenticare (2007)
- Sandrine in the Rain (2008)
- Blood of the Losers (2008)
- Riflessi (2009)
- Don Matteo (2009)
- Squadra antimafia – Palermo oggi (2009)
- Anti-Drug Squad (2011)
- Ultimo - L'occhio del falco (2013)
- I segreti di Borgo Larici (2014)
- Le frise ignoranti (2015)
- Questo è il mio paese (2015)
- Seguimi (2017)
- Body of Deceit (2017)
- Malarazza (2017)
- Mò vi mento - Lira di Achille (2017)
- La vita dopo (2018)
- Un amore così grande (2018)
- Red Shoes - Il figlio del Boss (2021)
- Selfiemania (2021)
- Anime borboniche (2021)
- Storia di una famiglia perbene (2021/2023)
- Mamma qui comando io (2022)
- Even (2022)
- Racconti della domenica (2022)
- Mentre non c'eri (2022)
- Joachim and the Apocalypse (2023)

== Awards and recognition ==
- 2021 - Cinemagia Movie Awards - Best Cinematography
  - SelfieMania (2021)
- 2021 - Inventa un Film
  - Award: "Sei Premi in Cerca d'Autore"
- 2021 - Premio Apoxiomeno
  - Award: Sordi Family Award
- 2021 - Premio Vincenzo Crocitti
  - Life Career Award Cinematography - Cinematography
- 2020 - International Tour Film Festival
  - Special Award
- 2020 - Terra di Siena Film Festival
  - Life Career Award Cinematography
- 2019 - Festival Internazionale del Cinema dei Castelli Romani
  - Life Career Award Cinematography
- 2018 - Festival Internazionale del Cinema dei Castelli Romani
  - Best Cinematography: Seguimi (2017)
- 2017 - Umbrialand
  - Best Cinematography: Seguimi (2017)
- 2018 - David di Donatello
  - Best Cinematography: Malarazza: una storia di periferia (2017)
- 2023 - David di Donatello
  - Best Cinematography: I Racconti della domenica (2022)
- 2023 Florence Film Awards
  - Best cinematography
