= Vittorio Sodano =

Italian make-up artist

Vittorio Sodano (Victor) is an Italian make-up artist. He was nominated for an Academy Award for Best Makeup for his work in Apocalypto (2006) and for Il divo (2010).

He was born in Naples on September 1, 1974. At the age 16, in London, he began his work as a make-up artist as a sculptor] and prosthodontist in a laboratory for film special effects. In 1996, he made his début in cinema with the film Prima che il tramonto (Before the Sunset) by Stefano Incerti, for which he won an award for make-up and special effects at the Locarno Film Festival. With considerable knowledge in the field of special effects make-up artist and application of prosthesis he began to assert himself in the Italian and European cinema, becoming a personal make-up artist of Italian actresses Margherita Buy, Laura Morante, Mariangela Melato and Valeria Golino. In 2024, he worked as make-up supervisor for the film Joachim and the Apocalypse by Jordan River.

== Awards and nominations ==
In 2007 Sodano got his first Oscar nomination for Apocalypto by Mel Gibson and a second one in 2010 for Il Divo by Paolo Sorrentino. In 2009 he won the "David of Donatello" for the same film in the make-up artist category.

- 2007 - Oscar nomination for Apocalypto by Mel Gibson.
- 2007 - Award Cinearti 'La chioma di Berenice' for Apocalypto by Mel Gibson.
- 2008 - Award Cinearti 'La chioma di Berenice' for Il Divo by Paolo Sorrentino.
- 2009 - Italian award 'David di Donatello' for Il Divo by Paolo Sorrentino.
- 2010 - Oscar nomination for Il Divo by Paolo Sorrentino.

== Filmography ==
- 1996 - Il fratello minore by Stefano Gigli
- 1999 - Prima del tramonto by Stefano Incerti
- 1999 - Le madri by Angelo Longoni (TV)
- 2000 - Against the Wind by Peter del Monte
- 2001 - Three Wives by Marco Risi
- 2001 - The Ignorant Fairies by Ferzan Özpetek
- 2002 - Incompreso by Enrico Oldoini (TV)
- 2002 - The Best Day of My Life by Cristina Comencini
- 2003 - It Can't Be All Our Fault by Carlo Verdone
- 2003 - The Good Pope: Pope John XXIII by Ricky Tognazzi (TV)
- 2003 - Remember Me, My Love by Gabriele Muccino
- 2004 - Part-time by Angelo Longoni
- 2004 - Love Returns by Sergio Rubini
- 2004 - The Vanity Serum by Alex Infascelli
- 2004 - Nero by Paul Marcus (TV)
- 2005 - Empire of the Wolves by Chris Nahon
- 2005 - Casanova by Lasse Hallstrom
- 2006 - Fade to Black by Oliver Parker
- 2006 - Liscio by Claudio Antonini
- 2006 - Tre donne morali by Marcello Garofalo
- 2006 - Apocalypto by Mel Gibson
- 2006 - The Black Dahlia by Brian de Palma
- 2007 - Il Capo dei Capi by Alexis Cahill and Enzo Monteleone (TV)
- 2007 - The Hideout by Pupi Avati
- 2008 - Il Divo by Paolo Sorrentino
- 2008 -The Dust of Time by Theo Angelopoulos
- 2009 - I, Don Giovanni by Carlos Saura
- 2010 - We Believed by Mario Martone
- 2012 - Safe House by Daniel Espinosa
- 2012 - The Ideal City di Luigi Lo Cascio
- 2014 - Un mondo nuovo by Alberto Negrin (TV)
- 2015 - A Bigger Splash by Luca Guadagnino
- 2015 - Bite by Alberto Sciamma
- 2016 - Ballad in Blood by Ruggero Deodato
- 2018 - Reckless by Marco Ponti
- 2018 - Beate by Samad Zarmandili
- 2019 - Nati 2 volte by Pierluigi Di Lallo
- 2021- I Am Santa Claus by Edoardo Falcone
- 2022 - Paradise Valley by Carlo Fusco
- 2023 - The Goat by Ilaria Borrelli
- 2024 - Joachim and the Apocalypse by Jordan River
