= Ho sposato un calciatore =

2005 Italian television mini series

- Created by: Stefano Sollima
- Starring: Paolo Seganti
- Composer: Pivio and Aldo De Scalzi
- Country of origin: Italy
- No. of seasons: 1
- No. of episodes: 4

Production
- Cinematography: Paolo Carnera

Original release
- Network: Canale 5
- Release: 2005 – 2005

Ho sposato un calciatore (Italian for "I married a footballer") is a 2005 Italian television mini series written and directed by Stefano Sollima. It was broadcast on Canale 5, and is based on the UK serial Footballers' Wives.

== Main cast ==
- Paolo Seganti as Bruno Caracci
- Jane Alexander as Tonia Caracci
- Karin Proia as Anna Palma
- Edoardo Leo as Vito Palma
- Maria Elena Vandone as Crystal Ferrari
- Mirko Petrini as Luca Martelli
- Frank Crudele as Carmine Caradia
- David Sef as Jorge Vildoza
- Benedetta Valanzano as Miriam Bove
- Gea Lionello as Veronica Torre
- Stefania Rivi as Monica Ballini
- Edoardo Siravo as Peppe Perego
- Caterina Vertova as Linda Martelli
- Valerio Aprea as Gualtiero
- Simona Borioni as Marcella Basile
- Aurora Cancian as Fiorenza Messeri
- Simona Caparrini as Gina
- Martina Disposti as Marika Palma
- Marco Di Stefano as Paolo Mastrangelo
- Antonella Interlenghi as Regina Caradia
- Maria Monsè as Alessia
- Lorenzo Renzi as Raffaele Brasca
- Alessandro Tiberi as Mattia Covelli
- Costantino Vitagliano as Guido Ballini
