= Il tredicesimo apostolo =

2012 Italian horror TV series

- Genre: Supernatural horror Drama
- Created by: Pietro Valsecchi
- Directed by: Alexis Sweet
- Starring: Claudio Gioè; Claudia Pandolfi; Luigi Diberti; Stefano Pesce; Yorgo Voyagis; Chiara Nicola; Glen Blackhall; Tommaso Ragno
- Country of origin: Italy
- No. of seasons: 2
- No. of episodes: 24

Production
- Running time: 50 min (episode)

Original release
- Network: Canale 5
- Release: January 4, 2012 – February 24, 2014

Il tredicesimo apostolo (English: The Thirteenth Apostle) is an Italian supernatural horror television series produced in 2012 and directed by Alexis Sweet.

== Characters ==
- Claudia Pandolfi as Doctor Claudia Munari (season 1-)
- Claudio Gioè as Father Gabriel Antinori (season 1-)
- Luigi Diberti as Monsignor Demetrio Antinori (season 1-)
- Yorgo Voyagis as Father Alonso (season 1-)
- Stefano Pesce as Isaia Morganti (season 1-)
- Tommaso Ragno as Bonifacio Serventi (season 1-)

== Episodes ==
Season	Episodes	Premiere	Finale
1	12	January 4, 2012	February 7, 2012
2	12	January 20, 2014	February 24, 2014

=== Season 1 - Il prescelto (2012) ===
No.	Title	Original release date
1	Gemelli (Twins)	January 4, 2012
2	Anatema (Anathema)	January 4, 2012
3	Presagi di morte (Omens of Death)	January 11, 2012
4	Un'altra vita (Another Life)	January 11, 2012
5	Rachele (Rachele)	January 18, 2012
6	La macchia di Lucifero (The Stain of Lucifer)	January 18, 2012
7	Dalle stelle (From the Stars)	January 25, 2012
8	La scelta (The Choice)	January 25, 2012
9	Il villaggio (The Village)	February 1, 2012
10	Fantasmi (Ghosts)	February 1, 2012
11	Il circolo di Plutarco (The Circle of Plutarch)	February 7, 2012
12	La profezia (The Prophecy)	February 7, 2012

=== Season 2 - La rivelazione (2014) ===
No.	Title	Original release date
1	Il guaritore (The Healer)	January 20, 2014
2	La martire (Martyr)	January 20, 2014
3	Tra la vita e la morte (Between Life and Death)	January 27, 2014
4	La casa del diavolo (The House of the Devil)	January 27, 2014
5	Finché morte non vi separi (Till Death Do You Part)	February 3, 2014
6	Legame paranormale (Paranormal Connection)	February 3, 2014
7	Fede (Faith)	February 10, 2014
8	Patto di sangue (Blood Pact)	February 10, 2014
9	L'uomo nero (The Black Man)	February 17, 2014
10	Il pianto del demonio (The Weeping of the Devil)	February 17, 2014
11	Il potere oscuro (The Dark Power)	February 24, 2014
12	La rivelazione (The Revelation)	February 24, 2014

== See also ==
- List of Italian television series
