= Joachim and the Apocalypse =

2024 Italian drama film

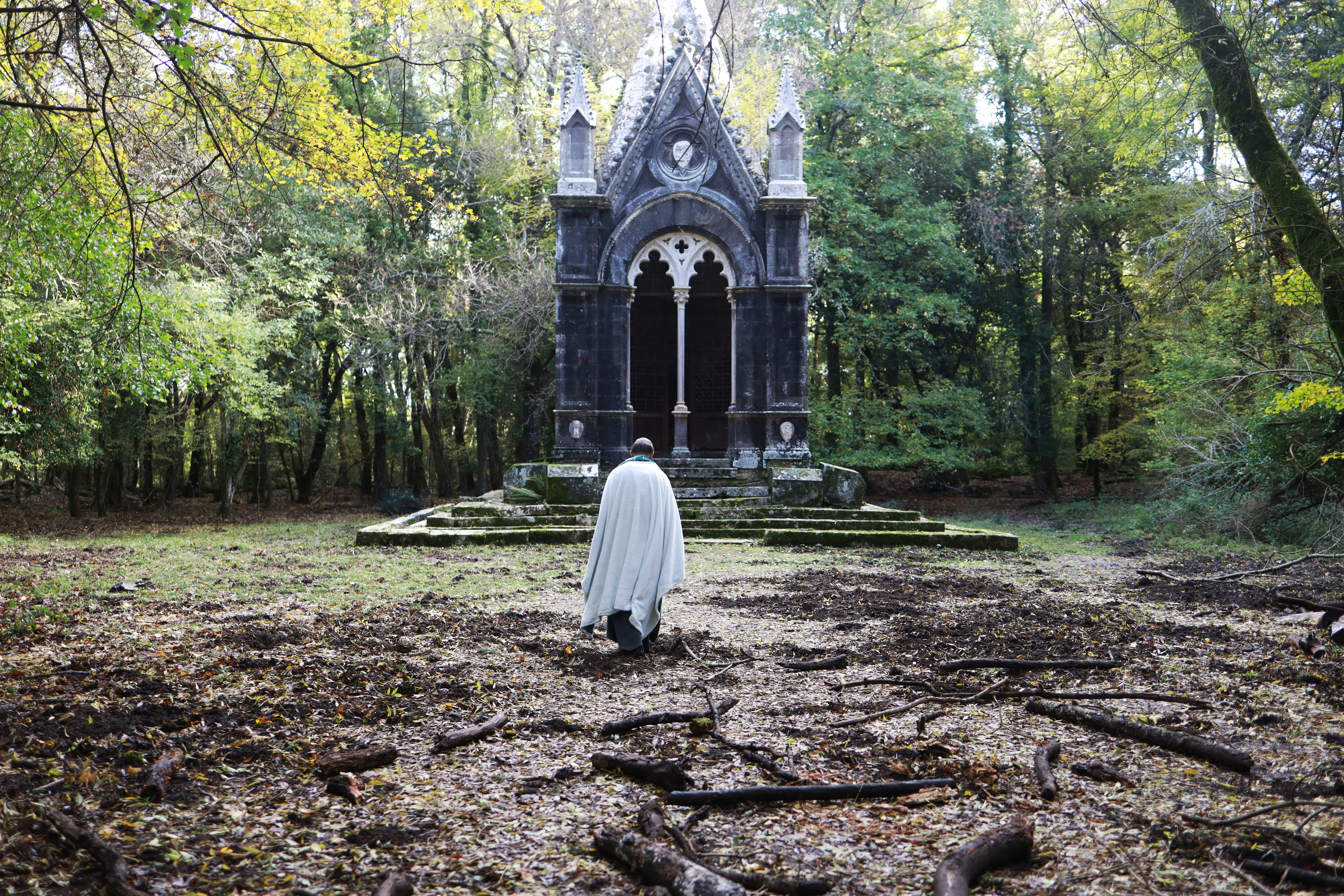
- Francesco Turbanti on the set of the film
- Directed by: Jordan River
- Screenplay by: Michela Albanese; Jordan River; Andrea Tagliapietra; Valeria De Fraja
- Produced by: Jordan River
- Starring: Francesco Turbanti; Elisabetta Pellini; Nikolay Moss; Bill Hutchens; G-Max; Giancarlo Martini; Willy Stella; Yoon C. Joyce
- Cinematography: Gianni Mammolotti
- Edited by: Alessio Focardi; Jordan River
- Music by: Michele Josia
- Production company: Delta Star Pictures Inc.
- Release date: 5 December 2024 (Italy)
- Running time: 85 minutes
- Country: Italy
- Languages: Latin, Italian, English

Joachim and the Apocalypse (Il monaco che vinse l'Apocalisse) is a 2024 Italian historical and spiritual film directed by Jordan River, and based on the apocalypse described by the mystic Joachim of Fiore.

== Cast ==
- Francesco Turbanti as Joachim of Fiore
- Nikolay Moss as Richard I of England
- Elisabetta Pellini as Constantia d'Altavilla Constance, Queen of Sicily
- Bill Hutchens as The Cabbalist
- G-Max as Galfredus De Clairvaux
- Giancarlo Martini as Ahàron
- Willy Stella as Enraged Man
- Yoon C. Joyce as Guardian of the Threshold

== Production ==
Filming began on 20 June 2022 in Italy (Calabria and Lazio) and completed in December 2022. It was the first Italian film shot in 12K resolution. The makeup of the film was overseen by Vittorio Sodano. On 17 January 2024, it was announced that the digital visual effects, supervised by Nicola Sganga, had been completed.

The original score for the film was composed by Michele Josia. The soundtrack won the Gold Medal - Original Score at the Global Music Awards in 2024.

== Theta Waves and Sound Technology ==
The film's audio features the first commercial application of the ThetaWave Cinematic Modulation System (TCMS), a neuroacoustic technology developed by Delta Star Pictures in 2023. Co-developed by director Jordan River and researcher Bruno Gioffré, the protocol integrates sub-threshold theta wave frequencies (4–7 Hz) within the film's musical score to induce a frequency following response in the audience without affecting the standard audio mix, dialogue intelligibility, or original dynamics.

The system operates entirely via software and relies on standard low-frequency effects (LFE) channels routed through specific sub-bass crossovers (10 Hz – 80 Hz), making it natively compatible with standard theatrical layouts such as Dolby Atmos, 7.1, and 5.1 surround sound arrays. The technology was subsequently reviewed in an academic seminar at the University of Rome Tor Vergata in May 2025.

== Awards ==
- Best Script Awards (London, UK)
  - 2024 - Best Script Award
- Terni International Film Festival.
  - 2024 - Best Film
  - 2024 - Best Photography
  - 2024 - Best Scenography
  - 2024 - Best VFX
- 78° Festival internazionale del cinema di Salerno
  - 2024 - Best Film

== Release ==
The film was released in Italy on 5 December 2024.

The U.S. premiere took place on February 26, 2025 at the TCL Chinese Theatre on Hollywood, an official selection at the 20th edition of the Los Angeles Film Festival.
