= Infernet =

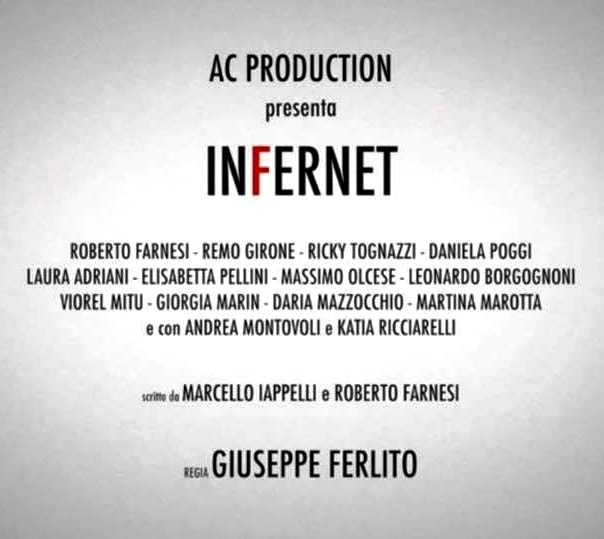
- Theatrical release poster
- Directed by: Giuseppe Ferlito
- Written by: Roberto Farnesi; Marcello Iappelli; Giuseppe Ferlito
- Produced by: Michele Calì; Federica Andreoli
- Starring: Roberto Farnesi; Remo Girone; Ricky Tognazzi; Daniela Poggi; Laura Adriani; Elisabetta Pellini; Massimo Olcese; Leonardo Borgognoni; Viorel Mitu; Giorgia Marin; Daria Mazzocchio; Martina Marotta; Andrea Montovoli; Katia Ricciarelli
- Cinematography: Roberto Ricci
- Edited by: Giuseppe Ferlito
- Music by: Umberto Smaila; Silvio Amato
- Production company: AC Production
- Release dates: November 14, 2015 (Verona premiere); April 28, 2016
- Country: Italy
- Language: Italian

Infernet is a 2016 Italian drama film. The screenplay was written by Giuseppe Ferlito, who also directed the film. It stars Roberto Farnesi, Remo Girone, Ricky Tognazzi, Elisabetta Pellini, Laura Adriani, Giorgia Marin, and Andrea Montovoli.

== Plot ==
Five stories intersect each other as happens with the mechanism of the network, of which the possible drifts are highlighted, but, in the end, also a constructive use of the medium. The events revolve around a gang of people from the middle class of Verona, addicted to the consumption of light drugs and alcohol, who are guilty of serious crimes.

Don Luciano, an unconventional, modern priest constantly engaged in media campaigns in support of immigrants, is unjustly accused of pedophilia, through a series of slanders spread online by one of the gang, which threatens to compromise his work.

Claudio is a famous actor who was publicly supporting the priest's initiatives, but he backs down after these accusations: he will reveal his true nature as an addict addicted to cocaine, and under the influence of the drug he will use violence against Giada, an admirer of his who was managed to get to know him and meet him at the hotel: she, engaged to one of the gang's boys, didn't want to give herself to him, because she dreamed of a more romantic first time, thus idealizing the public identity of the actor himself with whom she was in love. To the rape suffered by Claudio is also added a gang violence organized by her boyfriend who literally delivers it to three of his friends.

Giorgio, a wealthy entrepreneur father of another of the boys, squanders his possessions due to his habit of online gambling, until he dies of a broken heart, just a few moments before winning the sum necessary to reset all his debt.

Nancy, attracted by easy money, decides to prostitute herself, via an internet site, with two other friends, filming the clients themselves and then blackmailing them with requests for money. The organization will then be unmasked also through the suspicions of his taxi driver father.

Finally Sandro, one of the gang, who joins for fear of being bullied (perhaps for his latent homosexuality), is the computer expert of the group, who uses him to hack their parents' current accounts and above all to film their bravado: having identified a gay couple who had secluded themselves, the other boys beat the two, and take them to the hospital, where one of the two does not survive. In between criminal escapades, he devotes himself to helping his ailing cousin find a compatible bone marrow donor online. After the violence committed against Giada, Sandro, instead of posting the video he made on social networks, delivers it to the police station and reports the other boys. Later he will erase the defamatory writings on the walls of the parish of Don Luciano, who will be exonerated. Meanwhile, Claudio is also arrested, after the complaint made by his girlfriend Arianna when, secretly using her smartphone, she discovers images and videos of other victims of him, and finally helps Giada to start a path of psychological recovery.

== Cast ==
- Roberto Farnesi as Claudio Ruggeri
- Remo Girone as Don Luciano
- Ricky Tognazzi as Giorgio
- Laura Adriani as Giada
- Giorgia Marin as Nancy
- Elisabetta Pellini as Arianna
- Viorel Mitu as Ludovico
- Leonardo Borgognoni as Sandro
- Andrea Montovoli as Paolo
- Daniela Poggi as Martina
- Katia Ricciarelli as Sara
- Daniel Pistoni as Gianluca

== Premiere ==
The press conference of the movie was held at the Excelsior Hotel in Venice on September 10, 2015, during the 72nd Venice Film Festival. The film premiered on November 14, 2015, at the Gran Guardia Palace in Verona, and this premiere was followed by a nationwide premiere in Rome on April 20, 2016, at Cinema Adriano. It was released on April 28, 2016, on all Italian theaters.
