= List of RIS Delitti Imperfetti episodes =

The following is a list of episodes of the Italian television series RIS Delitti Imperfetti. Season 1 features 12 episodes, seasons 2–3 feature 16 episodes each and season 4–8 feature 20 episodes each. Season 1 aired from January 11 to February 16, 2005, season 2 from January 9 to February 20, 2006, season 3 from January 15 to February 20, 2007, season 4 from January 17 to March 20, 2008, season 5 from January 13 to March 18, 2009, season 6 from March 18 to May 20, 2010, season 7 from March 22 to May 24, 2011, and season 8 from October 3 to November 28, 2012.

RIS Delitti Imperfetti concluded after 8 seasons and 144 episodes running.

== Overview ==
Series	Episodes	Originally broadcast	
Series	Episodes	Series premiere	Series finale
1	12	January 12, 2005	February 16, 2005
2	16	January 9, 2006	February 20, 2006
3	16	January 15, 2007	February 20, 2007
4	20	January 17, 2008	March 20, 2008
5	20	January 13, 2009	March 18, 2009
6	20	March 18, 2010	May 20, 2010
7	20	March 22, 2011	May 24, 2011
8	20	October 3, 2012	November 28, 2012

== Episodes ==
=== Season 1 (2005) ===
No. overall	No. in season	Title	Directed by	Written by	Original release date	Italy viewers (millions)
1	1	"Resistless Test"	Alexis Sweet	Barbara Petronio & Leonardo Valenti & Vinicio Canton	January 12, 2005	8.33
2	2	"Accident"	Alexis Sweet	Barbara Petronio & Leonardo Valenti & Vinicio Canton	January 12, 2005	7.38
3	3	"Analysis of Murder"	Alexis Sweet	Barbara Petronio & Leonardo Valenti & Mimmo Rafele & Nicola Ravera Rafele	January 19, 2005	6.35
4	4	"Challenge for the Captain"	Alexis Sweet	Barbara Petronio & Leonardo Valenti & Mimmo Rafele & Nicola Ravera Rafele	January 19, 2005	5.88
5	5	"Blackmail: Part 1"	Alexis Sweet	Daniele Cesarano & Paolo Marchesini	January 25, 2005	N/A
6	6	"Blackmail: Part 2"	Alexis Sweet	Daniele Cesarano & Paolo Marchesini	January 25, 2005	N/A
7	7	"Hidden Truth"	Alexis Sweet	Paolo Marchesini & Massimo Bavastro & Barbara Petronio & Leonardo Valenti	February 2, 2005	6.82
8	8	"Beautiful Night"	Alexis Sweet	Paolo Marchesini & Massimo Bavastro & Barbara Petronio & Leonardo Valenti	February 2, 2005	6.50
9	9	"Blood Ties"	Alexis Sweet	Stefano Bises & Paolo Marchesini	February 9, 2005	6.88
10	10	"The Unexpected"	Alexis Sweet	Stefano Bises & Paolo Marchesini	February 9, 2005	7.15
11	11	"The Revenge"	Alexis Sweet	Francesco Balletta & Barbara Petronio & Leonardo Valenti	February 16, 2005	7.88
12	12	"The Final Challenge"	Alexis Sweet	Francesco Balletta & Barbara Petronio & Leonardo Valenti	February 16, 2005	8.36

=== Season 2 (2006) ===
No. overall	No. in season	Title	Directed by	Written by	Original release date	Italy viewers (millions)
13	1	"Dumb Witness"	Alexis Sweet	Paolo Marchesini & Barbara Petronio & Leonardo Valenti	January 9, 2006	N/A
14	2	"Without Suspicion"	Alexis Sweet	Barbara Petronio & Leonardo Valenti & Vinicio Canton	January 9, 2006	6.40
15	3	"Guilty or Innocent"	Alexis Sweet	Vinicio Canton & Barbara Petronio & Leonardo Valenti	January 11, 2006	6.75
16	4	"The Hour of Poison"	Alexis Sweet	Vinicio Canton & Barbara Petronio & Leonardo Valenti	January 11, 2006	6.30
17	5	"Last Salute"	Alexis Sweet	Sara Mosetti & Barbara Petronio & Leonardo Valenti	January 16, 2006	6.51
18	6	"Deception of the Science"	Alexis Sweet	Sara Mosetti & Barbara Petronio & Leonardo Valenti	January 16, 2006	6.20
19	7	"Dead Beauty"	Alexis Sweet	Paolo Marchesini & Francesco Balletta	January 23, 2006	6.57
20	8	"The Trap"	Alexis Sweet	Paolo Marchesini & Francesco Balletta	January 23, 2006	N/A
21	9	"The Murder Madness: Part 1"	Alexis Sweet	Paolo Marchesini & Barbara Petronio & Leonardo Valenti	January 30, 2006	6.64
22	10	"The Murder Madness: Part 2"	Alexis Sweet	Paolo Marchesini & Barbara Petronio & Leonardo Valenti	January 30, 2006	6.34
23	11	"The Crossfire"	Alexis Sweet	Barbara Petronio & Leonardo Valenti & Laura Nucilli	February 6, 2006	6.82
24	12	"The Surprise for the Captain"	Alexis Sweet	Barbara Petronio & Leonardo Valenti & Laura Nucilli	February 6, 2006	6.33
25	13	"The Obsession"	Alexis Sweet	Paolo Marchesini & Francesco Balletta	February 13, 2006	6.16
26	14	"The Devil's Hand"	Alexis Sweet	Paolo Marchesini & Francesco Balletta	February 13, 2006	5.51
27	15	"The Crime in the Closed Chamber"	Alexis Sweet	Paolo Marchesini & Barbara Petronio & Leonardo Valenti	February 20, 2006	5.92
28	16	"The Last Test"	Alexis Sweet	Paolo Marchesini & Barbara Petronio & Leonardo Valenti	February 20, 2006	5.86

=== Season 3 (2007) ===
No. overall	No. in season	Title	Directed by	Written by	Original release date	Italy viewers (millions)
29	1	"See You Soon, Captain"	Alexis Sweet	Filippo Gentili & Leonardo Gentili	January 15, 2007	5.84
30	2	"The Neighbors"	Alexis Sweet	Paolo Marchesini	January 15, 2007	5.51
31	3	"The Skin Color"	Alexis Sweet	Luca Monesi	January 16, 2007	6.14
32	4	"The Revenge is Cold Dish"	Alexis Sweet	Sara Mosetti	January 16, 2007	5.85
33	5	"The Woman To Be saved"	Pier Belloni	Francesco Balletta	January 22, 2007	5.52
34	6	"The Blood Doesn't Lie"	Pier Belloni	Laura Nucilli & Paolo Marchesini	January 22, 2007	5.05
35	7	"Among Life and Death"	Pier Belloni	Paolo Marchesini	January 23, 2007	6.49
36	8	"The Fear From The Crowd"	Pier Belloni	Leonardo Fasoli	January 23, 2007	5.95
37	9	"The Bus"	Pier Belloni	Stefano Bises	January 30, 2007	6.40
38	10	"Medium"	Pier Belloni	Filippo Kalomenidis	January 30, 2007	5.99
39	11	"Ready To Die"	Pier Belloni	Paolo Marchesini	February 6, 2007	6.30
40	12	"Establishment, Dear Son"	Pier Belloni	Sara Mosetti	February 6, 2007	5.61
41	13	"The Prisoner"	Pier Belloni	Francesco Balletta	February 13, 2007	6.48
42	14	"The African Fever"	Pier Belloni	Laura Nuccilli	February 13, 2007	6.50
43	15	"Venturi's Sins"	Pier Belloni	Barbara Petronio & Leonardo Valenti	February 20, 2007	6.61
44	16	"The Time Run"	Pier Belloni	Barbara Petronio & Leonardo Valenti	February 20, 2007	6.55

=== Season 5 (2009) ===
Actor	Character	Main cast	Recurring cast
Lorenzo Flaherty	Captain Riccardo Venturi	entire season	—N/a
Romina Mondello	Lieutenant Giorgia Levi	episodes 1–8	—N/a
Ugo Dighero	Sergeant Vincenco De Biase	entire season	—N/a
Fabio Troiano	Lieutenant Daniele Ghirelli	entire season	—N/a
Jun Ichikawa	Sublieutanant Flavia Ayroldi	entire season	—N/a
Magdalena Mochowska	Dr. Veronica Gambetta	episodes 3–20	—N/a
Paolo Maria Scalondro	Captain Edoardo Rocchi	entire season	—N/a
Gea Lionello	Dr. Claudia Morandi	entire season	—N/a
Nino D'Agata	General Giacomo Tosi	—N/a	episode 1

- 1.
- 2. The dangerous books
- 3. The sharp shooter
- 4. The last side
- 5. The book of the cult
- 6. The romantic woman
- 7. Self-defense
- 8. The relations
- 9. The defense of the homes
- 10. The road network
- 11. The shadow of his father
- 12. Blood sailing
- 13. The private justice
- 14. The lesson
- 15. That what is significantly is not visible to the naked eye
- 16. The lead mistakes
- 17. The life killers
- 18. The melodrama
- 19. The secret cults
- 20. The step from the end

=== Season 6 (2010) ===
Actor	Character	Main cast	Recurring cast
Euridice Axen	Captain Lucia Brancato	entire season	—N/a
Fabio Troiano	Lieutenant Daniele Ghirelli	entire season	—N/a
Mary Petruolo	Lieutenant Constanza Moro	entire season	—N/a
Primo Raggiani	Sublieutenant Emiliano Checci	entire season	—N/a
Jun Ichikawa	Sublieutanant Flavia Ayroldi	entire season	—N/a
Marco Rosseti	Lieutenant Bartolomeo Dossena	entire season	—N/a
Claudio Castargiovanni	Captain Guido Brancato	episodes 1–10,12–20	—N/a
Pierluiggi Coralo	Major Ernesto Rambaudi	—N/a	episodes 6–11

- 1. SPQR
- 2. The angel of death
- 3. The suicide letter
- 4. The secret of the golden tomb
- 5. The eye doesn't see
- 6. The end of the run
- 7. The Avenger
- 8. Who killed Santa Claus?
- 9. The first and the last
- 10. The crime of the veiled lady
- 11. The first blood
- 12. The family on the reunion
- 13. The Lucifer's effect
- 14. The past is coming back
- 15. The flaring man
- 16. The fire from the sky
- 17. The judgment day
- 18. Hackers and crackers
- 19. The miracles
- 20. The end of the game

=== Season 7 (2011) ===
Actor	Character	Main cast	Recurring cast
Euridice Axen	Captain Lucia Brancato	entire season	—N/a
Fabio Troiano	Captain Daniele Ghirelli	entire season	—N/a
Primo Raggiani	Sublieutenant Emiliano Checci	entire season	—N/a
Jun Ichikawa	Sublieutanant Flavia Ayroldi	episodes 1–3	episode 11
Simone Gandolfo	Lieutenant Orlando Sera	entire season	—N/a
Marco Rosseti	Lieutenant Bartolomeo Dossena	entire season	—N/a
Lucia Rossi	Sublieutenant Bianca Proetti	episodes 3–20	—N/a
Pierluiggi Coralo	Major Ernesto Rambaudi	episodes 1–10,12–20	—N/a

- 1. In the protection of own home
- 2. The wolf's gang
- 3. Sayonara
- 4. Over the mask
- 5. The fall in the disgrace
- 6. 2012
- 7. The rabbit's day
- 8. The wolf's voice
- 9. The sixth man
- 10. For the handful of coins
- 11. In the Stinco's foots
- 12. The secret dolls
- 13. The bones
- 14. The spektekl of cruelty
- 15. The beloved sister
- 16. The vampires in the Rome
- 17. I love you
- 18. The guinea pigs
- 19. The end
- 20. The last chance

=== Season 8 (2012) ===
Actor	Character	Main cast	Recurring cast
Euridice Axen	Captain Lucia Brancato	entire season	—N/a
Fabio Troiano	Captain Daniele Ghirelli	entire season	—N/a
Primo Raggiani	Sublieutenant Emiliano Checci	entire season	—N/a
Simone Gandolfo	Lieutenant Orlando Sera	entire season	—N/a
Marco Rosseti	Lieutenant Bartolomeo Dossena	entire season	—N/a
Lucia Rossi	Sublieutenant Bianca Proetti	entire season	—N/a
Pierluiggi Coralo	Major Ernesto Rambaudi	entire season	—N/a

- 1. The wolf's return
- 2. More ruthless than ever
- 3. Crack, you're dead
- 4. Clandesstino on the ship
- 5. Sasso's case
- 6. The fish called ball
- 7. In the body's absence
- 8. The declaration
- 9. The corridors of power
- 10. The deadly tattoo
- 11. In one way
- 12. The last confession
- 13. The purchase from the captain
- 14. Save Lara
- 15. The secret identity
- 16. I wrote it
- 17. The scorpion's bite
- 18. The lab rats
- 19. The search for the guns
- 20. Till the end

== External links (in Italian) ==
- List of RIS Delitti Imperfetti episodes (1st season)
- List of RIS Delitti Imperfetti episodes (2nd season)
- List of RIS Delitti Imperfetti episodes (3rd season)
- List of RIS Delitti Imperfetti episodes (4th season)
- Official website
