= The Father and the Foreigner =

2010 film directed by Ricky Tognazzi

- Directed by: Ricky Tognazzi
- Written by: Ricky Tognazzi; Giancarlo De Cataldo; Simona Izzo; Graziano Diana; Dino Giarrusso
- Produced by: Grazia Volpi; Agnese Fontana
- Starring: Alessandro Gassmann; Amr Waked; Kseniya Rappoport
- Cinematography: Tani Canevari
- Release dates: 30 October 2010 (Rome International Film Festival); 18 February 2011 (Italy)
- Running time: 110 minutes
- Country: Italy
- Language: Italian

The Father and the Foreigner (Italian: Il padre e lo straniero) is a 2010 Italian drama film directed by Ricky Tognazzi. It is based on the novel Crime Novel by Giancarlo De Cataldo.

== Plot ==
Diego (Alessandro Gassman), an employee from Rome with a disabled son, meets Walid (Amr Waked), a rich Syrian businessman whose son is also handicapped. From their shared suffering blooms quite an unusual friendship, and the two dads start spending time together at Turkish baths, luxury shopping sprees, and meeting a mysterious sister in law named Zaira (Nadine Labaki). With a private jet, they head to Syria to see the plot of land Walid purchased for his son. Once back from that short and rather unusual trip, the pain preventing Diego and his wife to enjoy some passionate moments starts fading away, while Walid disappears following terrorist allegations. Tailed by the Secret Service in a suffocating and ambiguous Rome, Diego sets out looking for the man, uncovering a shockingly sad truth.

== Cast ==
- Alessandro Gassman: Diego
- Kseniya Rappoport: Lisa
- Amr Waked: Walid
- Leo Gullotta: Santini
- Mohamed Zouaoui: Michel Arabesque
- Nadine Labaki: Zaira
- Emanuele Salce: Mazzoleni

== See also ==
- Movies about immigration to Italy
