= Simona Borioni =

Italian theater and movie actress

- Born: 7 January 1971; Rome, Italy
- Occupation: Actress

Simona Borioni (born 7 January 1971) is an Italian theater and film actress.

== Life and career ==
Born in Rome, Borioni studied singing and theater and followed acting workshops held by, among others, Susan Strasberg and Giorgio Albertazzi. She began his acting career in 1992, being mainly active on television where she appeared in several TV-series including Don Matteo, Carabinieri, Le ragazze di Piazza di Spagna, Camera Cafe and the Canale 5 soap opera Vivere. She also appeared in films, including works by Tinto Brass and Giuseppe Piccioni.

== Selected filmography ==
- Graffiante desiderio (1993)
- Senso '45 (2002)
- Le ultime 56 ore (2010)
- La bella società (2010)
- Una notte da paura (2011)
- Il camionista (2016)

=== TV ===
- Distretto di Polizia 3 (2002) –
- Vivere (2002–2003)
- Ho sposato un calciatore (2005)
- A voce alta (2006) –
- Questa è la mia terra (2006) –
- Due imbroglioni e... mezzo! (2007–2009)
- Dottor Clown (2008)
- Il mistero del lago (2009)
- Rex (2009)
- SMS - Squadra molto speciale (2010)
- Un amore e una vendetta (2011)
- Le tre rose di Eva 2 – serie TV (2013)
- Un caso di coscienza 5 (2013)
