= A Holy Venetian Family =

- Directed by: Pietro Parolin
- Written by: Pietro Parolin; Mario Cristiani; Andrea Fazzini
- Starring: Neri Marcorè; Stefano Pesce; Anna Dalton; Piera Degli Esposti
- Cinematography: Luca Coassin
- Music by: Lorenzo Tomio
- Release date: 5 February 2015
- Running time: 90 minutes
- Country: Italy
- Language: Italian

A Holy Venetian Family (Italian: Leoni [leˈoːni]) is a 2015 comedy film written and directed by Pietro Parolin and starring Neri Marcorè. Intended as an hommage to the classical commedia all'italiana, it was produced by the Centro Sperimentale di Cinematografia.

== Cast ==
- Neri Marcorè as Gualtiero
- Stefano Pesce as Alessio
- Piera Degli Esposti as Mara
- Anna Dalton as Elisa
- Antonio Pennarella as Gennaro
- Pierpaolo Spollon as Martino
- Helene Olivi Borghese as Irinka
- Vittorio Boscolo as Malgaro
- Cristina D'Alberto as Emma
- Eugenio Krauss as Bisol
- Giovanni Morassutti as Ragazzo compro oro

== See also ==
- List of Italian films of 2015
