= St. Francis (film) =

- Screenplay by: Leonardo Fasoli; Giacomo Scarpelli; Michele Soavi; Salvatore De Mola
- Story by: Leonardo Fasoli; Pietro Valsecchi
- Directed by: Michele Soavi
- Starring: Raoul Bova; Erika Blanc; David Brandon
- Composer: Carlo Siliotto
- Original language: Italian

Production
- Cinematography: Gianni Mammolotti
- Editor: Anna Napoli
- Running time: 182 minutes

Original release
- Network: Canale 5
- Release: 2002

St. Francis (Italian: Francesco) is a 2002 Italian television movie written and directed by Michele Soavi. The film is based on real life events of Catholic friar and then saint Francis of Assisi.

== Cast ==
- Raoul Bova as Francis
- Gianmarco Tognazzi as Bernardo
- Amélie Daure as Clare
- Claudio Gioè as Peter
- Paolo Briguglia as Sylvester
- Mariano Rigillo as Pietro di Bernardone
- Erika Blanc as Monna Pica
- Sergio Romano as Friar Elias
- Gabriele Bocciarelli as Friar Masseo
- Fausto Paravidino as Friar Gineprus
- Nino D'Agata as Friar Lion
- Toni Bertorelli as Pope Innocent III
- David Brandon as Favarone
- Luca Lionello as The Young Tailor
