= Simona Cavallari (actress) =

Italian actress (born 1971)

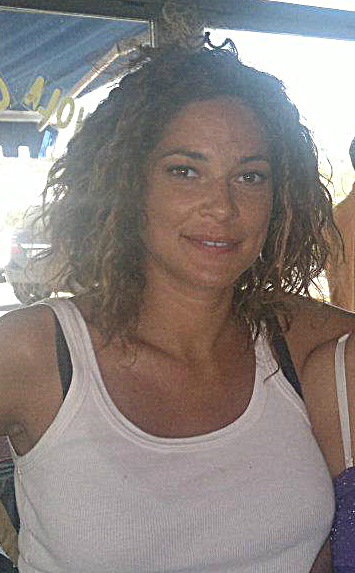
- Cavallari in 2011
- Born: 5 April 1971 (age 54); Rome, Italy
- Occupation: Actress

Simona Cavallari (born 5 April 1971) is an Italian actress of the cinema, theatre, and television.

== Career ==
She made her acting debut in 1982 at the age of eleven in the television film Colomba. In 1985, she had a role in The Pizza Connection, directed by Damiano Damiani. She has also performed in "La piovra" television series, and "Il Capo dei Capi", which was aired by Canale 5 in six parts in 2007.

In 2009, Cavallari played the female protagonist Claudia Mares in the Canale 5 miniseries "Squadra antimafia - Palermo oggi". Her co-stars were Giulia Michelini and Claudio Gioè, the latter with whom she also performed in "Il Capo dei Capi". In 2010 and 2011, she played the same role in the sequels "Squadra antimafia - Palermo oggi 2", "Squadra antimafia - Palermo oggi 3" and "Squadra antimafia - Palermo oggi 4".

== Selected television series ==
- Mino (1986)
- The Kaltenbach Papers (1991)
- Il Capo dei Capi (2007)
- Squadra antimafia - Palermo oggi (2009–2012)
- Le mani dentro la città (2014)
- Storia di una famiglia per bene (2021)
