= Squadra antimafia – Palermo oggi =

- Genre: Police procedural; Crime drama
- Created by: Pietro Valsecchi
- Starring: Simona Cavallari; Giulia Michelini; Marco Bocci; Claudio Gioè; Giordano De Plano; Paolo Pierobon; Ana Caterina Morariu; Valentina Carnelutti; Andrea Sartoretti; Greta Scarano; Ludovico Vitrano; Dino Abbrescia
- Country of origin: Italy
- Original language: Italian
- No. of seasons: 8
- No. of episodes: 74 (list of episodes)

Production
- Running time: 100 minutes

Original release
- Network: Canale 5
- Release: 31 March 2009 – 11 November 2016

Squadra antimafia – Palermo oggi is an Italian police procedural television series that broadcast on Canale 5 from 2009 to 2016.

== Synopsis ==
In the first four seasons, set in Palermo, the story of the struggle have told between the state and the Mafia through the events of the deputy superintendent of police, Claudia Mares, head of anti-mafia squad of Palermo, and Rosy Abate, a young woman tied to a mafia clan, linked by a tragic past that has brought them together. The end of this cycle see the death of Mares.

The fifth season of the events move to Catania. The star will once again be Rosy Abate and the vice Lara Colombo, who both compete for the love of the vice chief Domenico Calcaterra in a somewhat challenge between the Mafia and justice.

== Cast ==
- Simona Cavallari: Claudia Mares
- Giulia Michelini: Rosy Abate
- Marco Bocci: Domenico Calcaterra
- Claudio Gioè: Ivan Di Meo
- Giordano De Plano: Sandro Pietrangeli
- Paolo Pierobon: Filippo De Silva
- Ana Caterina Morariu: Lara Colombo
- Valentina Carnelutti: Veronica Colombo
- Andrea Sartoretti: Dante Mezzanotte
- Greta Scarano: Francesca Leoni
- Ludovico Vitrano: Gaetano Palladino
- Dino Abbrescia: Vito Sciuto
- Roberto Salemi: Benito Caputo
- Alice Palazzi: Fiamma Rigosi
- Raffaele Vannoli: Gigante
- Sergio Friscia: Nardo Abate
- Serena Iansiti: Ilaria Abate
- Francesca Valtorta: Rachele Ragno
- Ernesto D'Argenio: Saro Ragno
- Francesco Mandelli: Luca Serino
- Francesco Montanari: Achille Ferro
- Pino Caruso: Don Alfio Corvo
- Gianmarco Tognazzi: Giorgio Antonucci
- Massimo Corvo: Goffredo Pulvirenti
- Giuseppe Zeno: Vito Portanova
- Massimo De Santis: Armando Mezzanotte
- Tommaso Ramenghi: Umberto Nobile
- Luca Lionello: Tito Nerone
- Massimo Dobrovic: Narco-Colombiano
- Luigi Diberti: Oreste Ferro
- Edoardo Pesce: Michele Catena
- Alessandro Rugnone: Ruggero Spina
- Giovanni Scifoni: Davide Tempofosco
- Daniela Marra: Anna Cantalupo
- Giulio Berutti: Carlo Nigro
- Davide Iacopini: Giano Settembrini
- Silvia D'Amico: Rosalia Bertinelli

== Episodes ==
Season	Episodes	Prime TV
First season	6	2009
Second season	8	2010
Third season	10	2011
Fourth season	10	2012
Fifth season	10	2013
Sixth season	10	2014
Seventh season	10	2015
Eighth season	10	2016

== See also ==
- List of Italian television series
