= Paolo Seganti =

Italian actor

- Born: 20 May 1964 (age 61); Rovereto, Trentino, Italy
- Occupation: Actor
- Spouse: Carlotta
- Children: 5

Paolo Seganti (born 20 May 1964 in Rovereto, Trentino, Italy), is an Italian actor and model, known for playing Damian Grimaldi in the CBS television soap opera As the World Turns.

== Career ==
Seganti is known for his portrayal of Damian Grimaldi on the American daytime soap opera As the World Turns. He played the role from 1993 to 1997, returning briefly in 2001, 2006, and from 2009 to 2010. In 2013, he appeared on the soap opera One Life to Live as Arturo Bandini.

In 1996, Seganti made his prime time television debut in the sitcom The Nanny. That same year he debuted on the big screen with a small role in Everyone Says I Love You, directed by Woody Allen. In Italy, he appeared in Ultimo (1998), directed by Stefano Reali; Caraibi (1999), directed by Lamberto Bava; Tea with Mussolini (1999), directed by Franco Zeffirelli; Le Stagioni del Cuore (2003), directed by Antonio Luigi Grimaldi; and the TV miniseries Ho sposato un calciatore (2005), directed by Stefano Sollima. In 2007, Seganti played Martino Ristori in the eight-episode Canale 5 miniseries La figlia di Elisa – Ritorno a Rivombrosa, directed by Stefano Alleva. In 2008 he appeared in the movie Carnera – The Walking Mountain, directed by Renzo Martinelli and later in the TV adaptation Carnera – Il campione più grande (Carnera, the greatest champion).

== Filmography ==
=== Film ===
- L.A. Confidential as Johnny Stompanato, directed by Curtis Hanson (1997)
- Tea with Mussolini, directed by Franco Zeffirelli (1999)
- Signora, directed by Francesco Laudadio (2004)
- Carnera: The Walking Mountain, directed by Renzo Martinelli (2008)
- The Last Fashion Show (2011)
- All God's Children (2012)

=== Television ===
- As the World Turns as Damian Grimaldi (1993–1997, 2001, 2006, 2009–2010)
- The Nanny as Philippe (1996)
- Ultimo (TV miniseries), directed by Stefano Reali (1998)
- Caraibi, directed by Lamberto Bava as Ippolito Albrizzi (1999)
- Ultimo – La Sfida, directed by Michele Soavi (1999)
- Sex & Mrs. X, directed by Arthur Allan Seidelman (2000)
- Largo Winch as Largo Winch (2001–2003)
- CSI: Miami – Episode: "A Horrible Mind", directed by Greg Yaitanes (2002)
- Ultimo – L'Infiltrato, directed by Michele Soavi (2004)
- Le Stagioni del Cuore (TV series), directed by Antonio Luigi Grimaldi (2004)
- ER – Episode: "Two Ships" as Adrian Sianis, directed by Christopher Chulack (2005)
- Ho sposato un calciatore (I married a footballer) as Bruno Caracci, directed by Stefano Sollima (2005)
- The Closer – Episode: "Aftertaste" as Paul Bivas (2006)
- La figlia di Elisa - Ritorno a Rivombrosa, directed by Stefano Alleva (2007)
- Carnera – Il campione più grande, directed by Renzo Martinelli (2008)
- Bye Bye Sally, directed by Paul Leyden (2009)
- Sei passi nel giallo: Omicidio su misura, directed by Lamberto Bava
- Inspector Rex – Episode: "Vendetta", directed by Andrea Costantini (2011)
- One Life to Live as Arturo Bandini (2013)

=== Short ===
- L'ultima volta, directed by Andrea Costantini (2008) – Duration : 9 min. – 35mm

== Personal life ==
Seganti has five children with his wife, Carlotta. He owns and operates an Italian restaurant called La Pergoletta in Los Feliz, Los Angeles.
