= Fariborz Kamkari =

Fariborz Kamkari (Persian: فریبرز کامکاری) is a Kurdish Iranian film director and producer.

Kamkari was born in 1971 in Iran, and studied cinema and theater in Tehran, Iran. He has written several scripts for other Iranian directors, and has produced and directed some short films. In 2002, he wrote and directed his first feature film, Black Tape (edited by Amin Aslani. The film won the top jury prize at Cinequest Film Festival, and was in competition at several other festivals, including the Venice Film Festival.

In 2005, Kamkari wrote and directed The Forbidden Chapter, an Italy-France-Iran co-production.
