= Claudio Gioè =

Italian actor (born 1975)

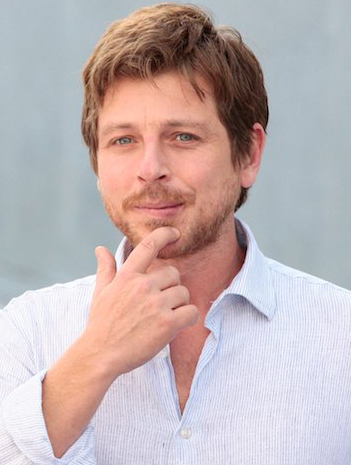
- Born: 27 January 1975 (age 51); Palermo, Italy
- Occupation: Actor
- Known for: His role as Mafia boss in the 2007 television miniseries Capo dei Capi

Claudio Gioè (born 27 January 1975 in Palermo, Italy) is an Italian film and television actor.

== Career ==
Gioè made his acting debut in the 1997 film "Qui" and has since performed in many other films such as "I cento passi" ("One Hundred Steps", about the life of Peppino Impastato), "La meglio gioventù" ("The Best of Youth"), "Operazione Odissea" and "La matassa". He is best known to Italian viewers for his portrayal of Mafia boss Salvatore Riina in the 2007 television miniseries "Il Capo dei Capi" ("Boss of Bosses"). It was aired by Canale 5 in six parts.

In 2009 Gioè had a starring role in another Mafia-related television miniseries, "Squadra antimafia- Palermo oggi", as vicequestore Ivan Di Meo. One of his co-stars was actress Simona Cavallari. In 2010, he starred in the sequel "Squadra antimafia - Palermo oggi 2".

Gioè starred as a young priest with psychic powers in the popular Canale 5 miniseries Il tredicesimo apostolo, which aired in January and February 2012.

== Filmography ==
=== Film ===
Year	Title	Role	Notes
1999	The Protagonists	Happy	
2000	One Hundred Steps	Salvo Vitale	
2003	Past Perfect	Gianmaria	
2003	The Best of Youth	Vitale Micavi	
2004	Stay with Me	Rodolfo	
2005	…e se domani	Giovanni	
2007	Piano, solo	Alessandro	
2009	La straniera	Torcelli	
2009	La matassa	Antonio	
2010	Henry	Inspector Silvestri	
2011	Boris: The Film	Francesco Campo	
2013	The Mafia Kills Only in Summer	Francesco	
2014	Without Pity	Roscio	
2017	Mom or Dad?	Furio	

=== Television ===
Year	Title	Role	Notes
1999	Operazione Odissea	Matteo "Telemaco" Terenzi	Television film
2001–2002	Bradipo	Walter	Main role; 12 episodes
2002	St. Francis	Pietro	Television film
2004	Paolo Borsellino	Antonio Ingroia	Television film
2006	Codice rosso	Ivan Amidei	Main role; 12 episodes
2007	Il Capo dei Capi	Totò Riina	Lead role; 6 episodes
2009–2010	Squadra antimafia	Ivan Di Meo	Main role (season 1-2); 14 episodes
2012–2014	Il tredicesimo apostolo	Father Gabriel Antinori	Lead role; 24 episodes
2015	Il bosco	Alessandro Corso	Main role; 4 episodes
2015–2017	Sotto copertura	Michele Romano	Lead role; 10 episodes
2016	Il sistema	Alessandro Luce	Lead role; 6 episodes
2016–2018	The Mafia Kills Only in Summer	Lorenzo Giammaresi	Lead role; 24 episodes
2018	Liberi sognatori	Mario Francese	Episode: "Delitto di mafia: Mario Francese"
2019	Rosy Abate	Ivan Di Meo	Episode: "Questione di famiglia"
2020	Vite in fuga	Giorgio Marasco / Claudio Caruana	Lead role; 12 episodes
2021–present	Màkari	Saverio Lamanna	Lead role; 7 episodes
