= Jordan River (director) =

Italian film director and screenwriter (born 1976)

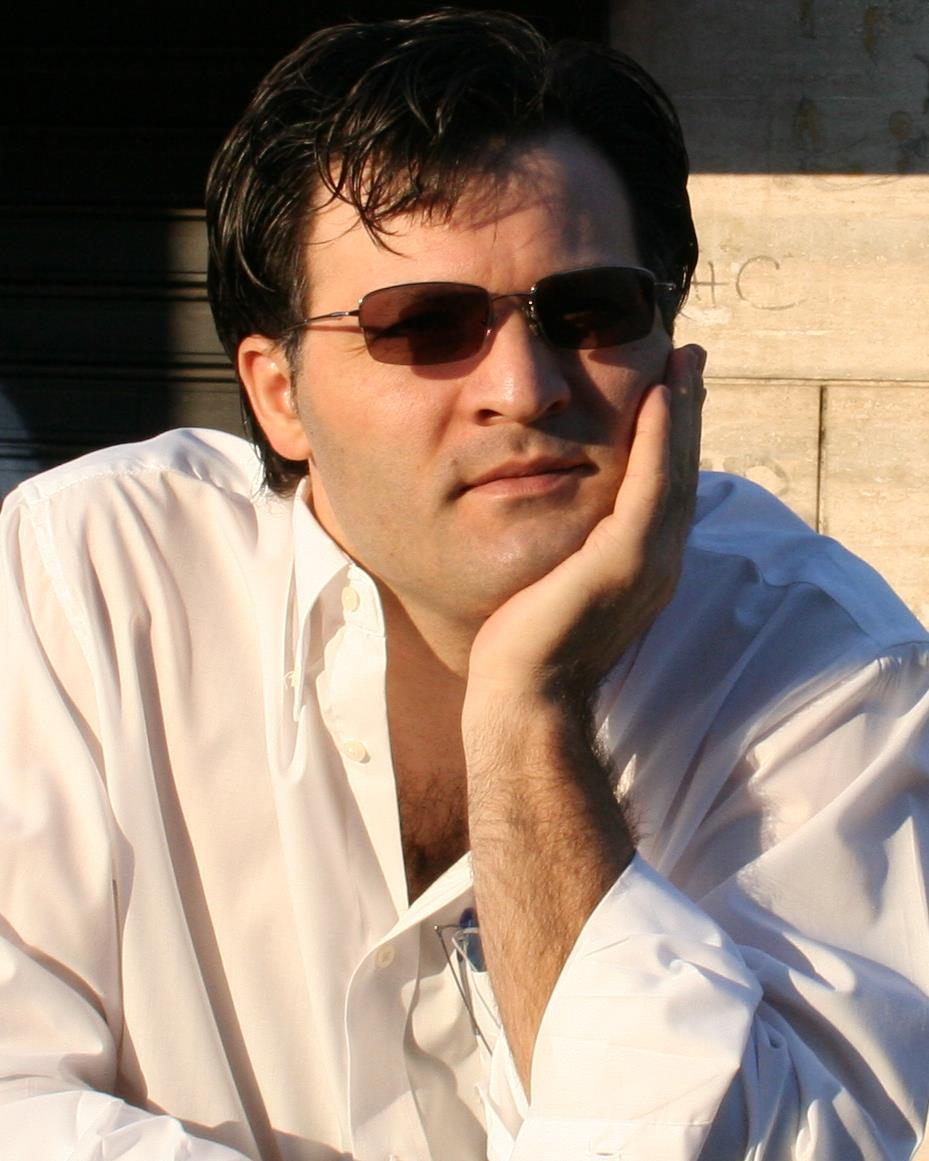
- Born: February 20, 1976 (age 49); Corigliano-Rossano
- Occupation(s): film director, screenwriter and producer

Jordan River (born 20 February 1976) is an Italian film director, screenwriter and producer.

A pioneer of Italian 3D cinema. After several study visits between London and Los Angeles, he returned to Rome, Italy, where he founded a production company and began his career in the film and audiovisual industry. He has directed several works for television and film, both for RAI and Cinecittà.

He recently directed the film Joachim and the Apocalypse Il monaco che vinse l'Apocalisse, one of the 24 Italian films proposed for nomination for the Academy of Motion Picture Arts and Sciences, which was released in Italian theaters in December 2024.

== Filmography ==
- 2012: Apollineum
- 2015: Hollywood Italian Lifestyle
- 2017: Le origini della cinematografia
- 2018: Stonehenge, il tempio dei druidi
- 2018: Caravaggio, la potenza della luce
- 2019: Dance - The Audition
- 2020: Artemisia Gentileschi, pittrice guerriera
- 2024: Joachim and the Apocalypse (Il monaco che vinse l'Apocalisse)

== Awards ==
- Terra di Siena International Film Festival
  - 2018: Best documentary Caravaggio, la potenza della luce
- Prix Silver Screen Award Feature Competition
  - 2018: Silver Screen Award Feature Competition at Nevada International Film Festival 2018 Le origini della cinematografia (Cinecittà Luce)
- Prix Golden Award Winner International Screen Awards
  - 2019: Golden Award Winner International Screen Awards Stonehenge - Il tempio dei druidi
- European Cinematography Awards
  - 2020: Winner Cinematography Award 2020
- Best Feature Docudrama
  - 2020: Best Feature Docudrama at Global Nonviolent Film Festival 2020 "Artemisia Gentileschi, pittrice guerriera"
- Best Italian film
  - 2024: 78° Festival internazionale del cinema di Salerno "Joachim and the Apocalypse"
