= Lorenzo Flaherty =

Italian actor

- Born: 24 November 1967 (age 58); Rome, Italy
- Occupation: Actor
- Years active: 1986–present
- Spouse: Roberta Floris (m. 2012)
- Partner: Alessandra Laudadio
- Children: 2

Lorenzo Flaherty (born 24 November 1967) is an Italian actor. He is the son of an Irish father and an Italian mother. He has appeared in more than forty films since 1986.

== Personal life ==
Lorenzo Flaherty is married and has two sons, one from his wife and one from a previous relationship; he considers himself Roman Catholic.

== Selected filmography ==
Film
Year	Title	Role	Notes
1986	Demons 2		
1988	Appointment in Liverpool		
1990	In the Name of the Sovereign People		
1991	Voices from Beyond		
1991	Mountain of Diamonds		
1997	Porzûs		

TV
Year	Title	Role	Notes
2005-2009	RIS Delitti Imperfetti	Captain Riccardo Venturi	
2011	Un amore e una vendetta	Marco Damiani	
