= RIS Delitti Imperfetti =

- Genre: Police procedural; Crime drama
- Created by: Pietro Valsecchi
- Directed by: Alexis Sweet (seasons 1-3); Pier Belloni (season 4); Fabio Tagliavia (seasons 5-6); Francesco Miccichè (seasons 7-8)
- Starring: Lorenzo Flaherty; Nicole Grimaudo; Filippo Nigro; Stefano Pesce; Ugo Dighero; Giulia Michelini; Gea Lionello; Giamperdo Judica; Nino D' Agata; Paolo Maria Scalondro; Leonardo Treviglio; Romina Mondello; Micaela Ramazzotti; Fabio Troiano; Michele Venitucci; Giorgia Surina; Jun Ichickawa; Magdalena Grochowska; Euridice Axen; Primo Reggiani; Mary Petruolo; Marco Rosseti; Claudio Castargiovani; Simone Gandolfo; Lucia Rossi; Perluiggi Coralo
- Theme music composer: Flavio Premoli
- Opening theme: Ris
- Country of origin: Italy
- Original language: Italian
- No. of seasons: 8
- No. of episodes: 144 (list of episodes)

Production
- Producer: Pietro Valsecchi
- Production locations: Parma, Italy
- Camera setup: Gianni Mammolotti (series 1); Claudio Bellero; Lorenzo Adorisio (seasons 2 and 3)
- Running time: 45'/50'

Original release
- Network: Canale 5
- Release: January 12, 2005 – March 18, 2009

Related
- R.I.S. Roma - Delitti imperfetti R.I.S, police scientifique

R.I.S. - Delitti Imperfetti (English: R.I.S - Imperfect Crimes) is an Italian television series, created in 2004 by Pietro Valsecchi, broadcast since January 2005 on Canale 5. The title, where R.I.S. is an acronym for Reparto Investigazioni Scientifiche (an actual, real-life unit of the Carabinieri, the Italian gendarmerie), could be approximately translated into English as Unit of Scientific Investigations: Imperfect Crimes. As the title indicates, the series is a crime drama, focusing on the scientific aspects of crime investigations, in a similar vein to the popular American TV series CSI: Crime Scene Investigation (though RIS is not a remake thereof).

== Plot summary ==
The Series follows the team of forensics who are trying to solve the case with help of evidence. Head of the R.I.S in first five seasons was Ricardo Venturi and in last three seasons Lucia Brancato. Location of the series is in Parma (seasons 1–5) and Rome (seasons 6–8). The change of location was made because Ghirelli (who has been in Parma in 4th and 5th season) and Flavia (who had been in Parma in 5th season) moved in Rome at the beginning of the 6th season.

== Characters ==
- Lorenzo Flaherty – Captain Riccardo Venturi, head of R.I.S. (2005–2009)
- Euridice Axen – Captain Lucia Brancato, head of R.I.S. (2010–2012)
- Nicole Grimaudo – Lieutenant Anna Giordano (2005–2006)
- Micaela Ramazzotti – Sara Melli (2007)
- Giorgia Surina – Lieutenant Michela Riva (2008)
- Jun Ichickava – Sublieutenant Flavia Ayroldi (2009–2011)
- Simone Gandolfo – Lieutenant Orlando Serra (2011–2012)
- Filippo Nigro – Lieutenant/Captain Fabio Martinelli (2005–2007)
- Michele Venitucci – Lieutenant Giovanni Rinaldi (2008)
- Primo Reggiani – Sublieutenant Emiliano Cecchi (2010–2012)
- Stefano Pesce – Lieutenant Davide Testi (2005–2007)
- Fabio Troiano – Lieutenant/Captain Daniele Ghirelli (2008–2012)
- Ugo Dighero – Marshal Vincenzo De Biase (2005–2009)
- Marco Rosetti – Lieutenant Bartolomeo Dossena (2010–2012)
- Giulia Michelini – Francesca de Biase (2005–2008)
- Magdalena Mochowska – Dr. Veronica Gambetta (2009)
- Mary Petruolo – Sublieutenant Constanza Moro (2010)
- Lucia Rossi – Sublieutenant Bianca Proetti (2011–2012)
- Gea Lionello – Dr. Claudia Morandi, ME (2005–2009)
- Giamperdo Judica – Captain Bruno Corsini, detective (2005)
- Paolo Maria Scalondro – Captain Edoardo Rocchi, detective (2006–2009)
- Claudio Castargiovanni – Captain Guido Brancato, detective (2010)
- Perluiggi Coralo – Captain Ernesto Rambaudi, detective (2010–2012)
- Nino D'Agata – General Giacomo Tosi, police general (2005–2007, 2009)
- Romina Mondello – Lieutenant Giorgia Levi (2006–2009)
- Leonardo Treviglio – Luka Grassi (2006)

Character	Played by	Position	Seasons							
Character	Played by	Position	1	2	3	4	5	6	7	8
Riccardo Venturi	Lorenzo Flaherty	Captain	Main	Main	Main	Main	Main	—N/a	—N/a	—N/a
Anna Giordano	Nicole Grimaudo	Lieutenant	Main	Main	—N/a	—N/a	—N/a	—N/a	—N/a	—N/a
Fabio Martinelli	Filippo Nigro	Lieutenant/Captain	Main	Main	Guest	—N/a	—N/a	—N/a	—N/a	—N/a
Davide Testi	Stefano Pesce	Lieutenant	Main	Main	Main	—N/a	—N/a	—N/a	—N/a	—N/a
Vincenzo De Biase	Ugo Dighero	Sergeant	Main	Main	Main	Main	Main	—N/a	—N/a	—N/a
Francesca De Biase	Giulia Michelini		Main	Recurring	Main	Main	—N/a	—N/a	—N/a	—N/a
dr. Claudia Morandi	Gea Lionello	Medical Examiner	Main	Main	Main	Main	Main	—N/a	—N/a	—N/a
Bruno Corsini	Giamperdo Judica	Lieutenant	Main	—N/a	—N/a	—N/a	—N/a	—N/a	—N/a	—N/a
Giacomo Tosi	Nino D'Agata	General	Main	Recurring	Recurring	—N/a	Recurring	—N/a	—N/a	—N/a
Edoardo Rocchi	Paolo Maria Scalondro	Captain	—N/a	Main	Main	Main	Main	—N/a	—N/a	—N/a
Luca Grassi	Leonardo Treviglio		—N/a	Main	—N/a	—N/a	—N/a	—N/a	—N/a	—N/a
Giorgia Levi	Romina Mondello	Lieutenant	—N/a	Main	Main	Main	Main	—N/a	—N/a	—N/a
Sara Neli	Micaela Ramazzotti		—N/a	—N/a	Main	—N/a	—N/a	—N/a	—N/a	—N/a
Daniele Ghirelli	Fabio Troiano	Lieutenant/Captain	—N/a	—N/a	—N/a	Main	Main	Main	Main	Main
Giovanni Rinaldi	Michele Venitucci	Lieutenant	—N/a	—N/a	—N/a	Main	Main	—N/a	—N/a	—N/a
Michela Riva	Giorgia Surina	Lieutenant	—N/a	—N/a	—N/a	Main	—N/a	—N/a	—N/a	—N/a
Flavia Ayroldi	Jun Ichickawa	Subliutenant	—N/a	—N/a	—N/a	—N/a	Main	Main	Main	—N/a
dr. Veronica Gambetta	Magdalena Mochowska		—N/a	—N/a	—N/a	—N/a	Main	—N/a	—N/a	—N/a
Lucia Brancato	Euridice Axen	Captain	—N/a	—N/a	—N/a	—N/a	—N/a	Main	Main	Main
Constanza Moro	Mary Petruolo	Sublieutenant	—N/a	—N/a	—N/a	—N/a	—N/a	Main	—N/a	—N/a
Emiliano Cecchi	Primo Raggiani	Sublieutenant	—N/a	—N/a	—N/a	—N/a	—N/a	Main	Main	Main
Bartolomeo Dossena	Marco Rossetti	Lieutenant	—N/a	—N/a	—N/a	—N/a	—N/a	Main	Main	Main
Guido Brancato	Claudio Castargiovanni	Captain	—N/a	—N/a	—N/a	—N/a	—N/a	Main	—N/a	—N/a
Orlando Serra	Simone Gandolfo	Lieutenant	—N/a	—N/a	—N/a	—N/a	—N/a	—N/a	Main	Main
Bianca Proetti	Lucia Rossi	Sublieutenant	—N/a	—N/a	—N/a	—N/a	—N/a	—N/a	Main	Main
Ernesto Rambaudi	Perluiggi Coralo	Captain	—N/a	—N/a	—N/a	—N/a	—N/a	Recurring	Main	Main

== Episodes ==
Series	Episodes	Originally broadcast	
Series	Episodes	Series premiere	Series finale
1	12	11 January 2005	16 February 2005
2	16	9 January 2006	20 February 2006
3	16	15 January 2007	20 February 2007
4	20	17 January 2008	20 March 2008
5	20	13 January 2009	18 March 2009
6	20	18 March 2010	20 May 2010
7	20	22 March 2011	24 May 2011
8	20	3 October 2012	28 November 2012

== Remakes ==
The series has successfully spawned three remakes: French R.I.S, police scientifique, German R. I. S. – Die Sprache der Toten, and Spanish RIS Cientifica.

== See also ==
- R.I.S, police scientifique, the French remake
- R. I. S. – Die Sprache der Toten, the German remake
- RIS Cientifica, the Spanish remake
