= Stefano Pesce =

Italian actor and author

- Born: 19 October 1967 (age 58); Bologna, Italy
- Occupation: Actor
- Height: 1.73 m (5 ft 8 in)

Stefano Pesce (born 19 October 1967) is an Italian actor.

== Filmography ==
Film
Year	Title	Role
1995	Facciamo paradiso	uncredited
1999	Amore a prima vista	Carabiniere
2000	Almost Blue	Computer technician
2002	Da zero a dieci	Giove
2003	It Can't Be All Our Fault	Marco
2005	La porta delle sette stelle	Stefano
2015	A Holy Venetian Family	Alessio
2015	La bugia bianca	University teacher
2019	The Most Beautiful Day in the World	Francesco Gagliardi
2019	Destini	
2021	Diabolik	Prosecutor

Television
Year	Title	Role
1993	Don Fumino	
2000	La squadra	Luca
2001	Incantesimo 4	Rocco
2002	La casa dell'angelo	Vittorio
2003	Sospetti 2	Stefano Magri
2003	Distretto di Polizia 4	Lorenzo Monti
2004	Cuore contro cuore	Marco Valle
2005	RIS Delitti Imperfetti	Davide Testi
2006	Saturday Night Live from Milano	Host
2007	Tutti i rumori del mondo	Stefano
2008	Inspector De Luca	Guido Leonardi
2008	Amiche mie	Federico
2009	Distretto di Polizia 9	Lorenzo Monti
2012–2014	Il tredicesimo apostolo – La rivelazione	Padre Isaia Morganti
2025	Balene – Amiche per sempre	Cesare Proietti
