= Ugo Dighero =

Italian actor and comedian

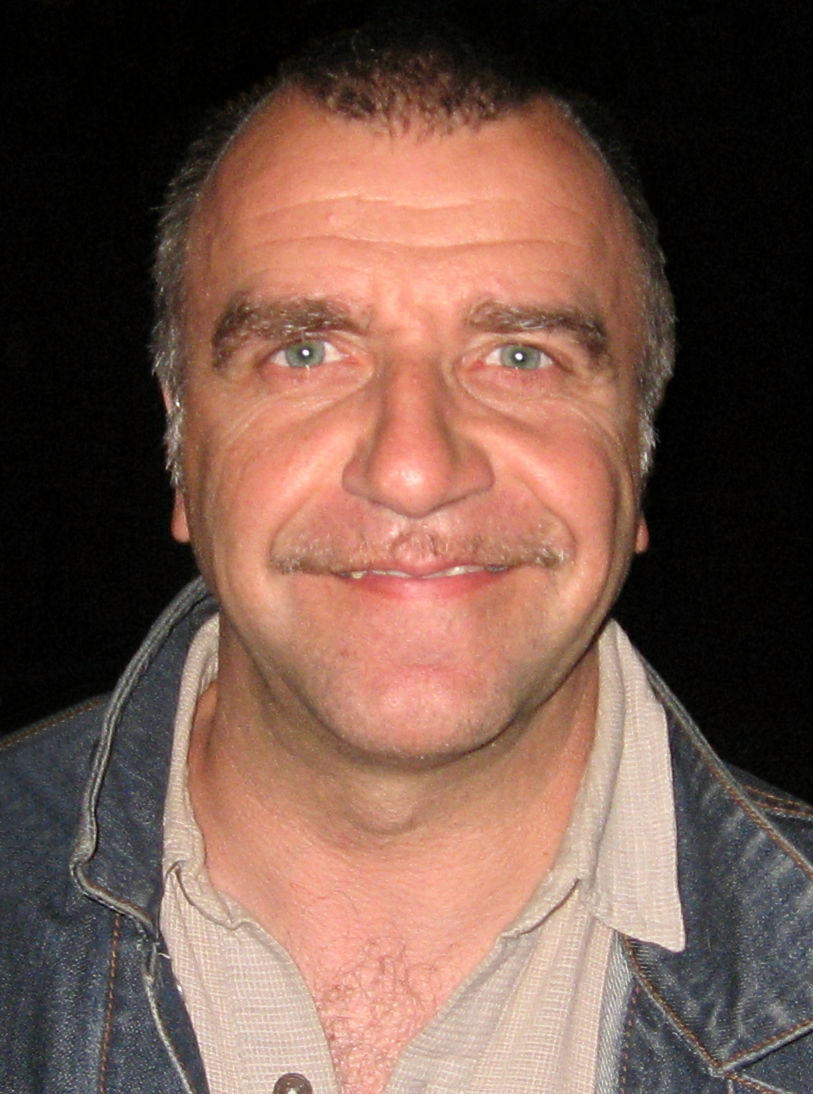
- Dighero at the 2008 Biografilm Festival
- Born: 4 October 1959 (age 66); Genoa, Italy
- Occupations: Actor; Comedian

Ugo Dighero (born 4 October 1959) is an Italian actor and comedian, whose career spanned over 40 years.

== Life and career ==
Born in Genoa, in 1979, Dighero enrolled at the drama school of the Teatro Stabile di Genova, graduating in 1982. In 1980, he co-founded the stage company Oltre l'immagine, and in 1986, he became a member of the stage company Teatro dell'Archivolto. In 1989, Dighero co-founded with Marcello Cesena, Maurizio Crozza, Mauro Pirovano and Carla Signoris the comedy ensamble Broncoviz, with whom he worked on stage, on television, on radio and in the film Peggio di così si muore, directed by Cesena.

After Broncovitz disbanded, Dighero worked as a comedian in the Gialappa's Band's variety shows Mai dire Gol and Mai dire Maik. As an actor, he is best known for the role of Giulio Pittaluga in Un medico in famiglia, and for playing the priest Pino Puglisi in the television miniseries Brancaccio.
