= Giulia Michelini =

Italian actress

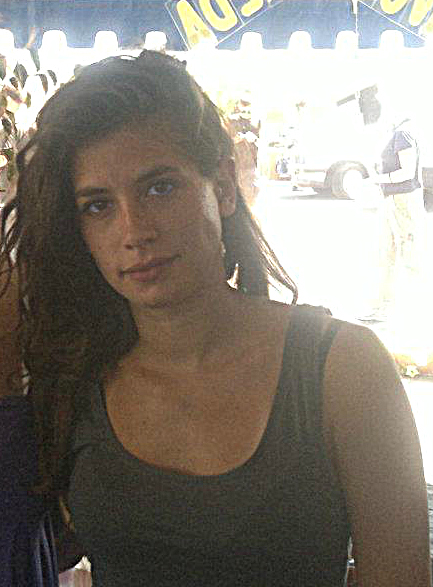
- Michelini in 2011
- Born: 2 June 1985 (age 41); Rome, Italy
- Occupation: Actress
- Known for: Squadra antimafia – Palermo oggi
- Height: 1.60 m (5 ft 3 in)
- Children: 1

Giulia Michelini (born 2 June 1985) is an Italian actress.

== Career ==
Michelini made her acting debut in 2002 in the third season of the police drama series Distretto di Polizia, which was televised by Mediaset's Canale 5.

In 2003 she debuted in her first feature film, Remember Me, My Love, directed by Gabriele Muccino. From 2009 to 2016 she played Mafia boss Rosy Abate in the series Squadra antimafia – Palermo oggi. In 2017 she starred in Squadra antimafia's spin-off Rosy Abate – La serie.

== Filmography ==
=== Films ===
Year	Title	Role	Notes
2003	Remember Me, My Love	Ilaria	Feature film debut
2007	The Girl by the Lake	Francesca	
2009	Cado dalle nubi	Marika Mantegazza	
2009	The Big Dream	Student	Cameo appearance
2011	The Immature	Cinzia	
2011	Hayfever	Franki	
2011	Horses	Veronica	
2012	Outing - Fidanzati per sbaglio	Carlotta Rappini	
2014	Fasten Your Seatbelts	Diana	
2015	Ever Been to the Moon?	Carola	
2015	Torno indietro e cambio vita	Giulia Borghini	
2015	Burning Love	Herself	Cameo appearance
2017	Dove non ho mai abitato	Giulia	
2018	There's No Place Like Home	Luana	
2018	Just Believe	Teresa	
2018	Nevermind	Giulia	
2025	The Big Fake	Donata	

=== Television ===
Year	Title	Role	Notes
2002–2005	Distretto di Polizia	Sabina Corsi	Recurring role; 6 episodes
2004	Paolo Borsellino	Lucia Borsellino	Miniseries
2005–2008	RIS Delitti Imperfetti	Francesca De Biase	Main role (season 1), recurring (seasons 2–4); 17 episodes
2006	Vientos de agua	Gemma	Main role; 9 episodes
2008	Aldo Moro - Il presidente	Anna Laura Braghetti	Miniseries
2009	La scelta di Laura	Laura Bertini	Lead role; 12 episodes
2009	I soliti idioti	Carmela	Sketch: "Il Mafioso"
2009–2016	Squadra antimafia - Palermo oggi	Rosy Abate	Main role (seasons 1–6), guest star (seasons 7–8); 55 episodes
2014	Gli anni spezzati	Valeria Venuti	Episode: "L'ingegnere"
2015	Il bosco	Nina Ferrari	Miniseries
2017	In Treatment	Bianca	Recurring role (season 3); 7 episodes
2017–2019	Rosy Abate - La serie	Rosy Abate	Lead role; 10 episodes
2018	Amici di Maria De Filippi	Herself/ Judge	Talent show
2020	Tutti per 1–1 per tutti	TomTom	Television film
2026	Motorvalley	Elena	Netflix

=== Music videos ===
Year	Title	Artist(s)	Director
2011	"Immaturi"	Alex Britti	Cosimo Alemà
2015	"Sei mai stata sulla luna?"	Francesco De Gregori	—N/a
2015	"Parte di me"	Francesco Sarcina	Giacomo Triglia
