= 59th David di Donatello =

2014 Italian film awards

- Date: 10 June 2014
- Site: De Paolis Studios, Rome, Italy
- Hosted by: Paolo Ruffini and Anna Foglietta

Highlights
- Best Picture: Perfect Strangers
- Most awards: They Call Me Jeeg (8)
- Most nominations: They Call Me Jeeg (17)

Television coverage
- Network: Sky Cinema

The 59th David di Donatello ceremony, presented by the Accademia del Cinema Italiano, was held on 10 June 2014.

== Winners and nominees ==
Best Film: Human Capital – directed by Paolo Virzì; The Great Beauty – directed by Paolo Sorrentino; The Mafia Kills Only in Summer – directed by Pierfrancesco Diliberto; The Chair of Happiness – directed by Carlo Mazzacurati; I Can Quit Whenever I Want – directed by Sydney Sibilia	Best Producer: Nicola Giuliano, Francesca Cima for Indigo Film - The Great Beauty; Fabrizio Donvito, Benedetto Habib, Maco Cohen for Indiana Production, Philippe Gompel, Birgit Kemner for Manny Films, with Rai Cinema and Motorino Amaranto - Human Capital; Mario Gianani, Lorenzo Mieli for Wildside with Rai Cinema - The Mafia Kills Only in Summer; Riccardo Scamarcio, Viola Prestieri for Buena Onda with Rai Cinema - Miele; Massimo Cristaldi, Fabrizio Mosca - Salvo; Domenico Procacci, Matteo Rovere with Rai Cinema - I Can Quit Whenever I Want
Best Director: Paolo Sorrentino - The Great Beauty; Carlo Mazzacurati - The Chair of Happiness; Ferzan Özpetek - Fasten Your Seatbelts; Ettore Scola - How Strange to Be Named Federico; Paolo Virzì - Human Capital	Best New Director: Pierfrancesco Diliberto - The Mafia Kills Only in Summer; Valeria Golino - Miele; Fabio Grassadonia and Antonio Piazza - Salvo; Matteo Oleotto - Zoran, My Nephew the Idiot; Sydney Sibilia - I Can Quit Whenever I Want
Best Actor: Toni Servillo - The Great Beauty; Giuseppe Battiston - Zoran, My Nephew the Idiot; Fabrizio Bentivoglio - Human Capital; Carlo Cecchi - Miele; Edoardo Leo - I Can Quit Whenever I Want	Best Actress: Valeria Bruni Tedeschi - Human Capital; Paola Cortellesi - Sotto una buona stella; Sabrina Ferilli - The Great Beauty; Kasia Smutniak - Fasten Your Seatbelts; Jasmine Trinca - Miele
Best Supporting Actor: Fabrizio Gifuni - Human Capital; Valerio Aprea - I Can Quit Whenever I Want; Giuseppe Battiston - The Chair of Happiness; Libero De Rienzo - I Can Quit Whenever I Want; Stefano Fresi - I Can Quit Whenever I Want; Carlo Verdone - The Great Beauty	Best Supporting Actress: Valeria Golino - Human Capital; Claudia Gerini - Blame Freud; Paola Minaccioni - Fasten Your Seatbelts; Galatea Ranzi - The Great Beauty; Milena Vukotic - The Chair of Happiness
David di Donatello for Best Screenplay: Francesco Piccolo, Francesco Bruni, Paolo Virzì - Human Capital; Paolo Sorrentino, Umberto Contarello - The Great Beauty; Michele Astori, Pierfrancesco Diliberto, Marco Martani - The Mafia Kills Only in Summer; Francesca Marciano, Valia Santella, Valeria Golino - Miele; Valerio Attanasio, Andrea Garello, Sydney Sibilia - I Can Quit Whenever I Want	Best Cinematography: Luca Bigazzi - The Great Beauty; Jérôme Alméras - Human Capital; Daniele Ciprì - Salvo; Gian Filippo Corticelli - Fasten Your Seatbelts; Gergely Poharnok - Miele
Best Production Design: Stefania Cella - The Great Beauty; Giancarlo Basili - Those Happy Years; Marco Dentici - Salvo; Marta Maffucci - Fasten Your Seatbelts; Mauro Radaelli - Human Capital	Best Score: Pivio e Aldo De Scalzi - Song'e Napule; Pasquale Catalano - Fasten Your Seatbelts; Lele Marchitelli - The Great Beauty; Umberto Scipione - Sotto una buona stella; Carlo Virzì - Human Capital
Best Original Song: "A' verità" from Song'e Napule - Music and lyrics by Francesco Liccardo, Rosario Castagnola, Sarah Tartuffo, Alessandro Nelson Garofalo, performed by Franco Ricciardi; "I'm Sorry" from Human Capital - Music and lyrics by Giacomo Vaccai, performed by Jackie O'S Farm; "A malìa" from The Art of Happiness - Music and lyrics by Dario Sansone, performed by Foja; "Tosami lady" from The Mafia Kills Only in Summer - Music and lyrics by Santi Pulvirenti, performed by Domenico Centamore; "Smetto quando voglio" from I Can Quit Whenever I Want - Music and lyrics by Domenico "Scarda" Scardamaglio; "Dove cadono i fulmini" from Una piccola impresa meridionale - Music, lyrics and performed Erica Mou	Best Editing: Cecilia Zanuso - Human Capital; Giogiò Franchini - Miele; Patrizio Marone - Fasten Your Seatbelts; Cristiano Travaglioli - The Great Beauty; Gianni Vezzosi - I Can Quit Whenever I Want
Best Sound: Roberto Mozzarelli - Human Capital; Maurizio Argenterie - Those Happy Years; Angelo Bonanni - I Can Quit Whenever I Want; Emanuele Cecere - The Great Beauty; Marco Grillo, Mirco Pantalla - Fasten Your Seatbelts	Best Costumes: Daniela Ciancio - The Great Beauty; Maria Rita Barbera - Those Happy Years; Alessandro Lai - Fasten Your Seatbelts; Bettina Pontiggia - Human Capital; Cristiana Ricceri - The Mafia Kills Only in Summer
Best Digital Effects: Rodolfo Migliari, Luca Della Grotta for Chromatica - The Great Beauty; EDI Effetti Digitali Italiani - Human Capital; Paola Trisoglio, Stefano Marinoni for Visualogie - The Mafia Kills Only in Summer; Rodolfo Migliari for Chromatica - I Can Quit Whenever I Want; Palantir Digital - Song'e Napule	Best Make-up Artist: Maurizio Silvi - The Great Beauty; Dalia Colli - The Mafia Kills Only in Summer; Paola Gattabrusi - Those Happy Years; Caroline Phillipponnat - Human Capital; Ermanno Spera - Fasten Your Seatbelts
Best Hairstylist: Aldo Signoretti - The Great Beauty; Francesca De Simone - Fasten Your Seatbelts; Stéphane Desmarez - Human Capital; Massimo Gattabrusi - Those Happy Years; Sharim Sabatini - The Chair of Happiness	Best Documentary Feature: Stop the Pounding Heart – directed by Roberto Minervini; Dal profondo – directed by Valentina Pedicini; Il segreto –directed by Cyop & Kaf; In utero Srebrenica – directed by Giuseppe Carrieri; L'amministratore – directed by Vincenzo Marra; Sacro GRA – directed by Gianfranco Rosi
Best Short Film: 37°4 S – directed by Adriano Valerio; A passo d'uomo – directed by Giovanni Aloi; Bella di notte – directed by Paolo Zucca; Lao – directed by Gabriele Sabatino Nardis; Non sono nessuno – directed by Francesco Segrè	Best European Film: Philomena – directed by Stephen Frears; Ida – directed by Paweł Pawlikowski; Blue Is the Warmest Colour – directed by Abdellatif Kechiche; Still Life – directed by Uberto Pasolini; Venus in Fur – directed by Roman Polański
Best Foreign Film: The Grand Budapest Hotel – directed by Wes Anderson; 12 Years a Slave – directed by Steve McQueen; American Hustle – directed by David O. Russell; Blue Jasmine – directed by Woody Allen; The Wolf of Wall Street – directed by Martin Scorsese	David Youth Award: The Mafia Kills Only in Summer – Pierfrancesco Diliberto; Human Capital – Paolo Virzì; The Great Beauty – Paolo Sorrentino; Sole a catinelle – Gennaro Nunziante; Blame Freud – Paolo Genovese
Special David Awards: Sophia Loren; Andrea Occhipinti; Marco Bellocchio (career award); Carlo Mazzacurati (career award) (posthumous); Riz Ortolani (career award) (posthumous)
