= Groenlandia (production company) =

Italian film production company

Groenlandia S.r.l.
- Type: Società a responsabilità limitata (S.r.l.)
- Industry: Entertainment
- Founded: 2014; 12 years ago
- Founders: Matteo Rovere; Sydney Sibilia
- Headquarters: Rome, Italy
- Key people: Matteo Rovere (CEO)
- Products: Films; Television series
- Parent: Banijay Entertainment (2022–present)
- Website: groenlandiagroup.com

Groenlandia S.r.l. (stylized as Grøenlandia) is an Italian film and television production company founded by Matteo Rovere and Sydney Sibilia.

== History ==
Groenlandia was founded by Matteo Rovere and Sydney Sibilia in 2014. In March 2022, it was acquired by French production and distribution group Banijay Entertainment and placed under its Italian division, Banijay Italia.

== Filmography ==
=== Film ===
Year	Title	Director	Ref.
2016	The Pills – Sempre meglio che lavorare	Luca Vecchi	
2017	I Can Quit Whenever I Want: Masterclass	Sydney Sibilia	
2017	Moglie e marito	Simone Godano	
2017	I Can Quit Whenever I Want: Ad Honorem	Sydney Sibilia	
2019	The First King: Birth of an Empire	Matteo Rovere	
2019	An Almost Ordinary Summer	Simone Godano	
2019	The Champion	Leonardo D'Agostini	
2020	The Beast	Ludovico Di Martino	
2020	Rose Island	Sydney Sibilia	
2021	Mondocane	Alessandro Celli	
2021	Blackout Love	Francesca Marino	
2021	Marilyn's Eyes	Simone Godano	
2022	September	Giulia Steigerwalt	
2022	A Breath of Fresh Air	Alessio Lauria	
2022	Delta	Michele Vannucci	
2022	The Hanging Sun	Francesco Carrozzini	
2022	The Voyagers	Ludovico Di Martino	
2022	La bella stagione	Marco Ponti	
2023	Like Sheep Among Wolves	Lyda Patitucci	
2023	Mixed by Erry	Sydney Sibilia	
2023	Non sono quello che sono	Edoardo Leo	
2023	Fragments of a Life Loved	Chloé Barreau	
2024	Sei fratelli	Simone Godano	
2024	Una storia nera	Leonardo D'Agostini	
2024	La coda del diavolo	Domenico de Feudis	
2024	Diva Futura	Giulia Steigerwalt	
2024	William Tell	Nick Hamm	
2024	Eroici! 100 anni di passione e racconti di sport	Giuseppe Marco Albano	
2024	100 di questi anni	Various	
2024	Maestro: Il calcio a colori di Tommaso Maestrelli	Francesco Cordio, Alberto Manni	
2025	Gioco pericoloso	Lucio Pellegrini	
2025	Giovanni Soldini – Il mio giro del mondo	Sydney Sibilia	
2025	Pino	Francesco Lettieri	
2025	Siblings	Greta Scarano	

=== Television ===
Year	Title	Network	Notes	Ref.
2020–2022	Romulus	Sky Atlantic		
2023–present	The Law According to Lidia Poët	Netflix		
2024	No Activity - Niente da segnalare	Amazon Prime Video		
2024	Antonia	Amazon Prime Video		
2024	Supersex	Netflix		
2024	Someone Killed Spiderman – Accidentally Famous	Sky Serie		
2024	This Is Not Hollywood	Disney+		
2025	Real Men	Netflix		
2025	Carosello in love	Rai 1	Television film	
2026	Motorvalley	Netflix		
