= Nastro d'Argento for Best Producer =

The Nastro d'Argento (Silver Ribbon) is a film award assigned each year, since 1946, by Sindacato Nazionale dei Giornalisti Cinematografici Italiani ("Italian National Syndicate of Film Journalists"), the association of Italian film critics.

This is the list of Nastro d'Argento awards for Best Producer. Angelo Barbagallo, Mario Cecchi Gori and Nanni Moretti are the most awarded Producers in this category, with 5 awards each.

== 1950s ==
- 1954 – Peg Film – I Vitelloni
- 1955 – Dino De Laurentiis, Carlo Ponti – La Strada
- 1956 – Cines – Amici per la pelle
- 1957 – Carlo Ponti – The Railroad Man
- 1958 – Dino De Laurentiis – Nights of Cabiria
- 1959 – Franco Cristaldi – A Man of Straw, La sfida, Big Deal on Madonna Street

== 1960s ==
- 1960 – Goffredo Lombardo – for the whole productions
- 1961 – Dino De Laurentiis – for the whole productions
- 1962 – Alfredo Bini – for the whole productions
- 1963 – Goffredo Lombardo – for the whole productions
- 1964 – Angelo Rizzoli – 8½
- 1965 – Franco Cristaldi – for the whole productions
- 1966 – Marco Vicario – Sette uomini d'oro
- 1967 – Antonio Musu – The Battle of Algiers
- 1968 – Alfredo Bini – Oedipus Rex
- 1969 – Luigi Carpentieri, Ermanno Donati – Il giorno della civetta

== 1970s ==
- 1970 – Alberto Grimaldi – for the whole productions
- 1971 – Silvio Clementelli – The Fifth Day of Peace
- 1972 – Mario Cecchi Gori – for the whole productions
- 1973 – Alberto Grimaldi – for the whole productions
- 1974 – Franco Cristaldi – for the whole productions
- 1975 – Rusconi Film – Conversation Piece
- 1976 – Andrea Rizzoli – My Friends
- 1977 – Edmondo Amati – for the whole productions
- 1978 – RAI TV – for the whole productions
- 1979 – RAI TV – for the whole productions

== 1980s ==
- 1980 – Franco Cristaldi, Nicola Carraro – for the whole productions
- 1981 – Fulvio Lucisano, Mauro Berardi – I'm Starting from Three
- 1982 – Mario Cecchi Gori, Vittorio Cecchi Gori – for the whole productions
- 1983 – RAI TV – for the whole productions
- 1984 – Gianni Minervini – Where's Picone?
- 1985 – Fulvio Lucisano – for the whole productions
- 1986 – Fulvio Lucisano – for the whole productions
- 1987 – Franco Committeri – The Family
- 1988 – Angelo Barbagallo, Nanni Moretti
- 1989 – Mario Cecchi Gori, Vittorio Cecchi Gori – for the whole productions

== 1990s ==
- 1990 – Claudio Bonivento – Mery per sempre
- 1991 – Mario Cecchi Gori, Vittorio Cecchi Gori – for the whole productions
- 1992 – Angelo Barbagallo, Nanni Moretti – The Yes Man
- 1993 – Angelo Rizzoli – for the whole productions
- 1994 – Fulvio Lucisano, Leo Pescarolo, Guido De Laurentiis – The Great Pumpkin
- 1995 – Mario Cecchi Gori, Vittorio Cecchi Gori – for the whole productions
- 1996 – Angelo Barbagallo, Nanni Moretti – The Second Time
- 1997 – Antonio Avati, Pupi Avati, Aurelio De Laurentiis – Festival
- 1998 – Marco Risi, Maurizio Tedesco – Hamam
- 1999 – Medusa Produzione – The Legend of 1900

== 2000s ==
- 2000 – Giuseppe Tornatore – The Prince's Manuscript
- 2001 – Tilde Corsi, Gianni Romoli – The Ignorant Fairies
- 2002 – Fandango – for the year's production
- 2003 – Fandango – L'imbalsamatore, Remember Me, My Love, Velocità massima
- 2004 – Angelo Barbagallo – The Best of Youth
- 2005 – Aurelio De Laurentiis – Tutto in quella notte
- 2006 – Riccardo Tozzi, Marco Chimenz, Giovanni Stabilini – Don't Tell, Romanzo Criminale, Once You're Born You Can No Longer Hide
- 2007 – Nanni Moretti, Angelo Barbagallo – The Caiman
- 2008 – Domenico Procacci – Quiet Chaos, La giusta distanza, Lascia perdere, Johnny!, Le ragioni dell'aragosta, Silk
- 2009 – Fabio Conversi, Maurizio Coppolecchia, Nicola Giuliano, Andrea Occhipinti, Francesca Cima – Il Divo

== 2010s ==
- 2010 – Giorgio Diritti, Simone Bachini – The Man Who Will Come
- 2011 – Domenico Procacci, Nanni Moretti – We Have a Pope
- 2012 – Domenico Procacci – Diaz – Don't Clean Up This Blood
- 2013 – Isabella Cocuzza, Arturo Paglia – The Best Offer
- 2014 – Domenico Procacci, Matteo Rovere – I Can Quit Whenever I Want
- 2015 – Luigi Musini, Olivia Musini – Black Souls, Greenery Will Bloom Again, Last Summer
- 2016 – Pietro Valsecchi – Quo Vado?, Chiamatemi Francesco, Don't Be Bad
- 2017 – Attilio De Razza, Pierpaolo Verga – Indivisible; Attilio De Razza – L'ora legale
- 2018 – Archimede, Rai Cinema, Matteo Garrone, Paolo Del Brocco – Dogman
- 2019 – Groenlandia in collaboration with Rai Cinema, 3 Marys Entertainment – The First King: Birth of an Empire, The Champion

== 2020s ==
- 2020 – Agostino Saccà, Giuseppe Saccà, Maria Grazia Saccà – Bad Tales and Hammamet

== See also ==
- David di Donatello for Best Producer
- Cinema of Italy
