= Motorvalley =

- Genre: Sports drama
- Created by: Matteo Rovere
- Starring: Giulia Michelini; Luca Argentero; Caterina Forza
- Country of origin: Italy
- Original language: Italian

Production
- Producer: Groenlandia

Original release
- Network: Netflix
- Release: February 10, 2026

Motorvalley is an Italian sports drama series released on Netflix on 10 February 2026. It was co-created by Matteo Rovere along with Francesca Manieri and Gianluca Bernardini. Set within the Emilia-Romagna region, often referred to as Italy's Motor Valley,—the series follows a racing engineer who forms an underdog team to compete in the Italian Gran Turismo Championship.

== Synopsis ==
The series centers on Elena, an engineer and daughter of a racing team owner. Following a technical scandal involving illegal car modifications that results in her father's death and the restructuring of the team under new management led by her brother, Elena is excluded from its operations. She subsequently establishes an independent racing team, SC17. She recruits Blu, a driver with a background in illegal street racing, and Arturo (Luca Argentero), a former racing champion who retired after an on-track accident. The series follows their efforts to compete in the Italian Gran Turismo Championship.

== Cast and characters ==
- Giulia Michelini as Elena
- Luca Argentero as Arturo
- Caterina Forza as Blu

== Production ==
=== Development ===
The series was created by Matteo Rovere, who also served as a director and writer for the project. Rovere previously wrote and directed the critically acclaimed 2016 racing film Italian Race (Veloce come il vento).

=== Filming ===
Principal photography took place primarily in the Emilia-Romagna region of Northern Italy, which is associated with automotive manufacturers such Ferrari, Lamborghini, and Maserati.

== Reception ==
Motorvalley received positive reviews from several critics.

Neerja Ch of Midgard Times awarded the series a 7/10, praising the "authentic" use of real locations and the chemistry between the lead actors, though she noted that the pacing occasionally faltered. Diego Lerer of Micropsia described the series as a blend of family melodrama and high-octane action, comparing its style to the Fast & Furious franchise and Drive to Survive.

Decider offered a "Stream It" recommendation, identifying the series as a solid entry in the "underdog sports drama" subgenre. The review highlighted the strong dynamic between the three leads and noted that the high-stakes racing sequences successfully elevate the familiar "zero-to-hero" narrative arc.

However, some critics questioned the narrative choices in later episodes. Greg Wheeler of The Review Geek criticized the logic of the crime-focused subplots in Episode 5, calling certain heist sequences "contrived."
