= Francesco Acquaroli =

Francesco Acquaroli may refer to:

- Francesco Acquaroli (actor) (born 1962), Italian actor
- Francesco Acquaroli (politician) (born 1974), Italian politician
