= Giusy Buscemi =

Italian actress and model

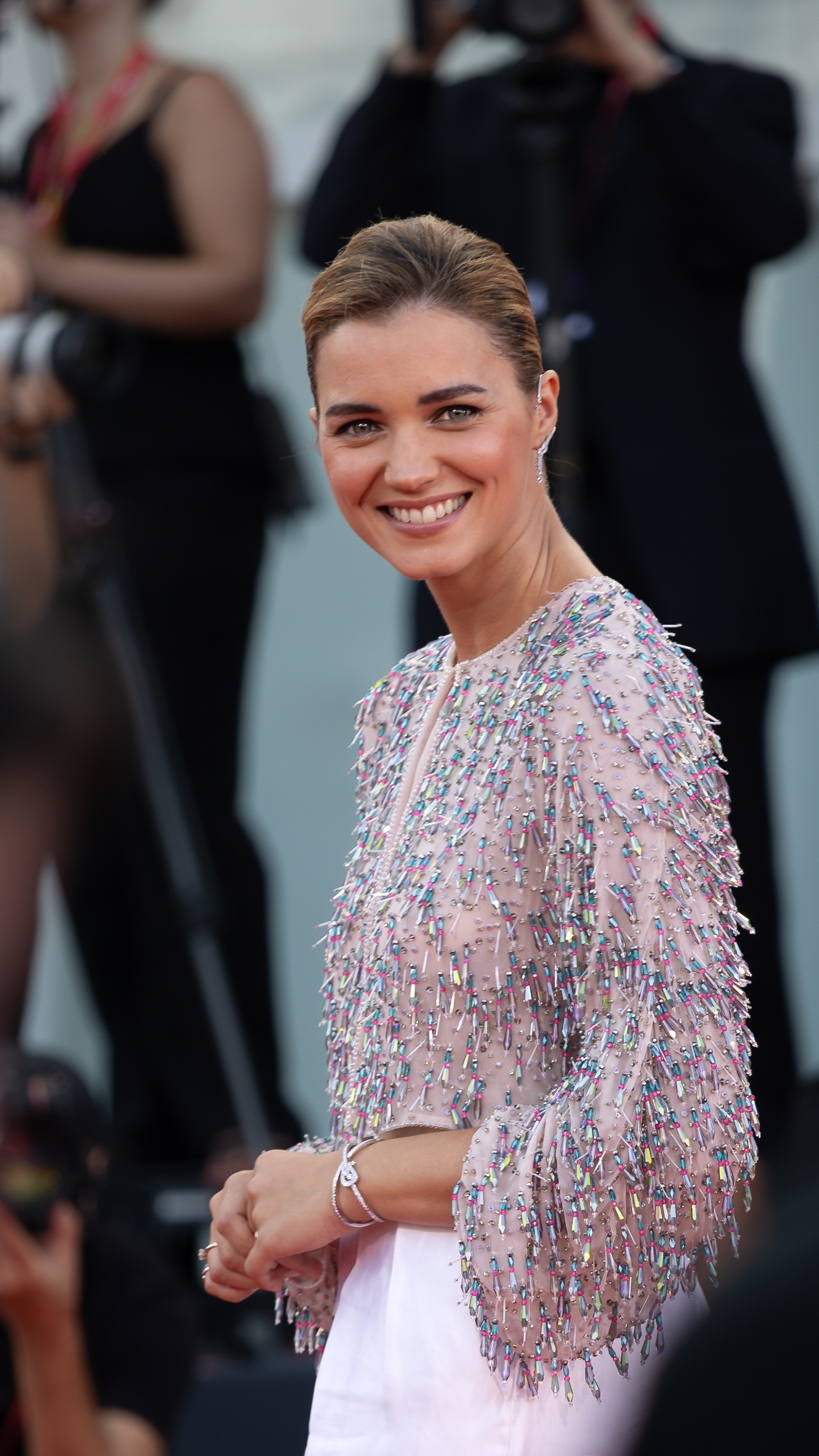
- Giusy Buscemi, actress, at 81st Venice International Film Festival in Venice, Italy.
- Born: Giuseppina Buscemi; 13 April 1993 (age 33); Mazara del Vallo, Sicily, Italy
- Occupations: Actress; model
- Years active: 2012–present
- Spouse: Jan Michelini (m. 2015)
- Children: 3

Giuseppina "Giusy" Buscemi (born 13 April 1993) is an Italian actress and former model. She won Miss Italia in 2012.

== Personal life ==
Buscemi has been married to director Jan Michelini since 2015, and has three children with him: Caterina Maria (born 11 February 2018), Pietro Maria (born 5 October 2019) and Elia Maria (born 31 July 2022). She identifies as a Catholic.

== Filmography ==
=== Films ===
Year	Title	Role(s)	Notes
2012	Baci salati	Foreign girl	Cameo appearance
2014	Unique Brothers	Agata	
2015	Les figures du silence	Elettra	Short film
2017	I Can Quit Whenever I Want: Masterclass	Alice Gentili	
2017	I Can Quit Whenever I Want: Ad Honorem	Alice Gentili	
2018	Arrivano i prof	Ms. De Maria	

=== Television ===
Year	Title	Role(s)	Notes
2012	Miss Italia	Herself / Contestant	Annual beauty contest – Winner
2014	Don Matteo	Assuntina Cecchini	2 episodes
2014	La bella e la bestia	Princess Juliette DalVille	Miniseries
2015	Un passo dal cielo	Manuela Nappi	Recurring role; 9 episodes
2015	The Young Montalbano	Anita	Episode: "Morte in mare aperto"
2015	La dama velata	Amelie	Recurring role; 3 episodes
2015–2017	Il paradiso delle signore	Teresa Iorio	Lead role (seasons 1–2); 40 episodes
2016	Stanotte a…	Herself / Guest	Episode: "Firenze"
2016	Medici	Rosa	2 episodes
2017	C'era una volta Studio Uno	Elena Cecere	Miniseries
2022	Doc - Nelle tue mani	Lucia Ferrari	Recurring role (season 2)
2024	Vanina - Un vicequestore a Catania	Giovanna "Vanina" Guarrasi	Lead role
