= Fresi =

Fresi is an Italian surname. Notable people with the surname include:

- Salvatore Fresi (born 1973), Italian footballer
- Stefano Fresi (born 1974), Italian actor, composer and singer
