= Peppe Barra =

Italian singer and actor (born 1944)

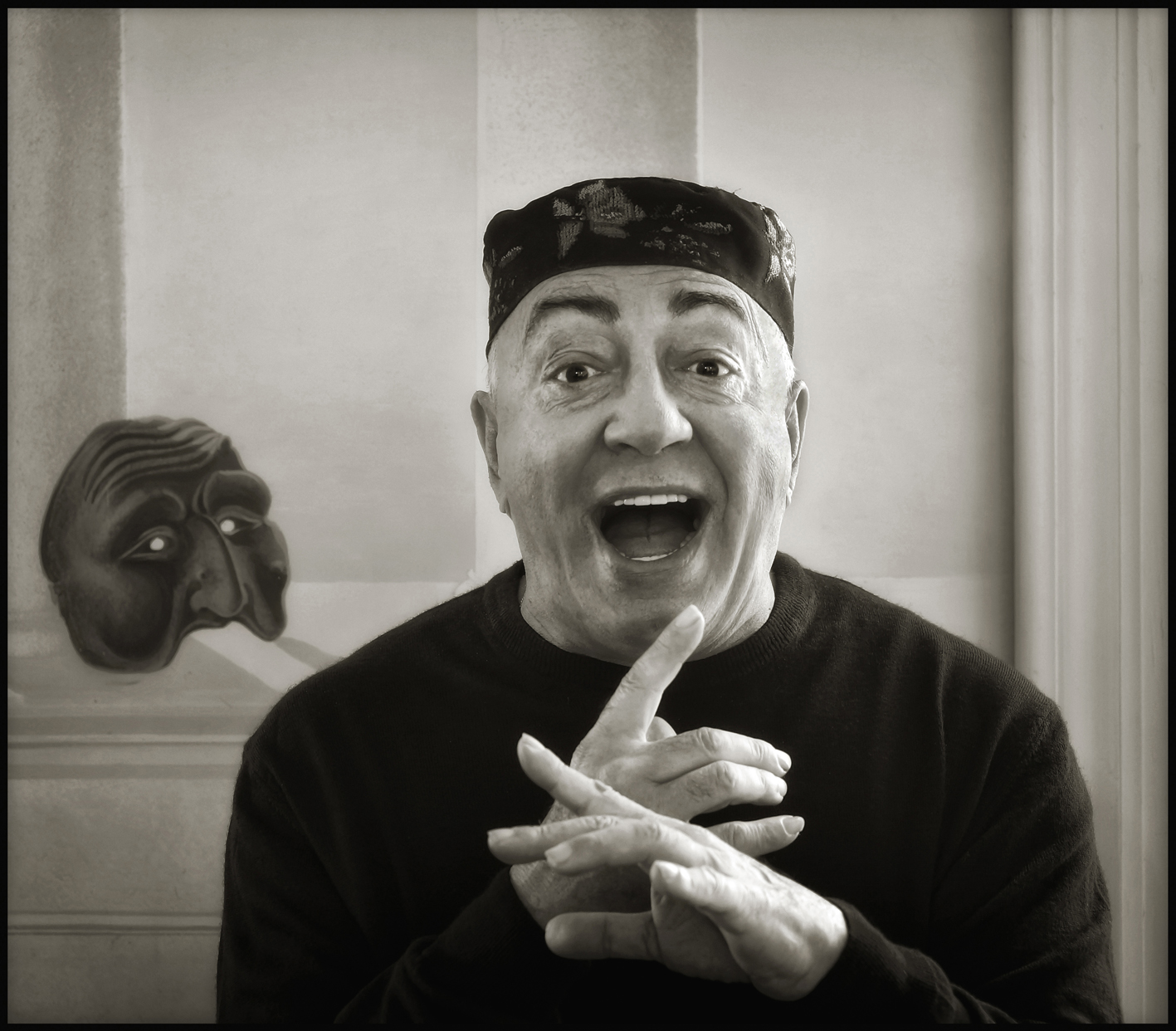
- Barra in 2015
- Born: Giuseppe Barra; 24 July 1944 (age 82); Rome, Italy
- Occupation: Singer-songwriter

Giuseppe "Peppe" Barra (born 24 July 1944) is an Italian folk singer, actor, playwright and composer.

== Life and career ==
Born in Rome into a family of Procidan actors, when he was only six years old Barra enrolled in an acting school for children, the Teatrino di Zietta Liù. In the early 1970s, he befriended Roberto De Simone and entered the Nuova Compagnia di Canto Popolare ensemble, with whom he stayed until 1978. In 1976, he got his personal breakout as main actor in the De Simone's stage musical La Gatta Cenerentola.

In 1982, Maurizio Scaparro as artistic director of the Carnival of Venice asked Barra to make a performance, and on this occasion Barra launched "Peppe e Barra", a musical that marked the beginning of the stage company "Peppe e Concetta Barra" with his mother Concetta, and that got a large success, being staged in Italy for several seasons and also performed in New York, Paris, Barcelona, Bombay and Geneva, among other places. In 1992, he made his solo discographic debut with Mo vene, for which he won the Targa Tenco for Best Performer. His variegated career also include films and television.

== Discography ==
=== Solo albums ===
- Mo vene (1992)
- M'aggia curà (1995)
- Il borghese gentiluomo (2001)
- Guerra (2001)
- Peppe Barra in concerto (2003)
- La Cantata dei Pastori (2004)
- Matina (2005)
- Decamerone (2006)
- N'attimo (2009)
- Ci vediamo poco fa (2011)
- E cammina cammina (2016)
- Cipria e caffè (2024)

=== With Concetta Barra ===
- Peppe e Barra (1983)
- Peppe e Concetta Barra N.1 (1988)

=== With NCCP ===
- Cicerenella (1972)
- Lo Guarracino (1972)
- La serpe a Carolina (1972)
- NCCP (1973)
- Li sarracini adorano lu sole (1974)
- Tarantella ca nun va bbona (1975)
- La gatta Cenerentola (1976)
- 11 mesi e 29 giorni (1977)
- La cantata dei pastori (1977)
- Aggio girato lu munno (1978)

== Selected filmography ==
- Neapolitan Mystery, directed by Sergio Corbucci (1979)
- The Skin, directed by Liliana Cavani (1981)
- Pinocchio, directed by Roberto Benigni (2002)
- Opopomoz, directed by Enzo D'Alò (2003, voice)
- Passione, directed by John Turturro (2010)
- I Can Quit Whenever I Want: Ad Honorem, directed by Sydney Sibilia (2017)
- Naples in Veils, directed by Ferzan Özpetek (2017)
