= Francesco Acquaroli (actor) =

Italian actor (born 1962)

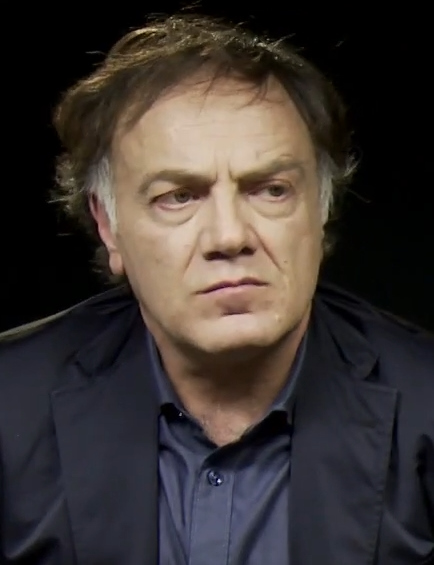
- Francesco Acquaroli in 2019
- Born: 27 March 1962 (age 63); Rome, Italy
- Occupation: Actor
- Height: 1.79 m (5 ft 10 in)

Francesco Acquaroli (born 27 March 1962) is an Italian actor.

== Biography ==
Acquaroli was born in Rome in 1962. After high school, he attended the La Scaletta Theatre School, where he studied under Antonio Pierfederici with whom he made his theatre debut in 1987.

In 1988/89, he was in "La nave" by Gabriele D'Annunzio with the direction of Aldo Trionfo. Then he continued with other great directors such as Elio De Capitani, Mario Missiroli, Luca Ronconi, Giuseppe Patroni Griffi and many more.

He made his television debut in 1997 in "The Red and the Black", where he played the Count of Altamira.

He participated in other television series, including Distretto di Polizia, L'avvocato Porta, Romanzo criminale – La serie, and Squadra antimafia – Palermo oggi, Rocco Schiavone in seasons 1 to 3, for Rai 2 and in "Solo for Mediaset.

In film, Acquaroli debuted in Diaz – Don't Clean Up This Blood by Daniele Vicari, followed by Oranges & Hammer by Diego Bianchi, Pasolini by Abel Ferrara, Era d'estate by Fiorella Infascelli, Mia Madre by Nanni Moretti, I Can Quit Whenever I Want by Sydney Sibilia, The Last Will Be the Last by Massimiliano Bruno, "Dogman" by Matteo garrone, "The Best Years" by Gabriele Muccino, "My Name Is Mohammed" by Pascaljevich, and Adults in the Room by Costa-Gavras. He is the protagonist of Paolo Sorrentino's short film "Little Roman Adventures".

His performance in "Sole, cuore, amore" by Vicari presented at the Rome Film Festival, met with great acclaim from critics and audiences, winning the Alberto Sordi prize as supporting actor at the Bari International Film Festival.

Acquaroli is the narrator in "I mille giorni di Mafia Capitale", a documentary aired on Rai 3 in September 2017. Acquaroli portrays Samurai on the Netflix series Suburra: Blood on Rome. Acquaroli portrays Ebal Violante in the fourth season of American television series Fargo.

== Personal life ==
Since 2018, Acquaroli has supported Médecins Sans Frontières; he has lent his voice to the video and radio spot of the campaign "Cure in the heart of the conflicts".

== Filmography ==
=== Cinema ===
- Diaz - Don't Clean Up This Blood, directed by Daniele Vicari (2012)
- Like the Wind, directed by Marco Simon Puccioni (2013)
- Short Skin, directed by Duccio Chiarini (2014)
- Arance & martello, directed by Diego Bianchi (2014)
- I Can Quit Whenever I Want, directed by Sydney Sibilia (2014)
- Hope Lost, directed by David Petrucci (2014)
- Pasolini, directed by Abel Ferrara (2014)
- The Last Will Be the Last, directed by Massimiliano Bruno (2015)
- Viva la sposa, directed by Ascanio Celestini (2015)
- Mia madre, directed by Nanni Moretti (2015)
- Era d'estate, directed by Fiorella Infascelli (2016)
- Sun, Heart, Love, directed by Daniele Vicari (2016)
- I Can Quit Whenever I Want: Masterclass, directed by Sydney Sibilia (2017)
- I Can Quit Whenever I Want: Ad Honorem, directed by Sydney Sibilia (2017)
- Dogman, directed by Matteo Garrone (2018)
- Welcome Home, directed by George Ratliff (2018)
- Adults in the Room, directed by Costa-Gavras (2019)
- The Best Years, directed by Gabriele Muccino (2020)
- The Great Ambition, directed by Andrea Segre (2024)

=== Television ===
- Le rouge et le noir, directed by J. D. Verhaeghe (1997)
- Il maresciallo Rocca, directed by Lodovico Gasparini (1997)
- Distretto di Polizia, directed by Renato De Maria (2000)
- La contessa di Castiglione, directed by Josée Dayan and A. Barzini (2005)
- L'avvocato Porta, directed by Franco Giraldi (2005)
- Amore e guerra, directed by G. Campiotti (2007)
- Scusate il disturbo, directed by Luca Manfredi (2009)
- Romanzo criminale - La serie – TV series (2010)
- Un posto al sole (2011)
- Il restauratore- second season (2013)
- Don Matteo – TV series (2013)
- Non uccidere –TV series (2015)
- Squadra antimafia 7 (2015)
- Solo – TV series (2016)
- Rocco Schiavone – TV series (2016-2019)
- Suburra: Blood on Rome – TV series (2017–2020)
- Fargo – Season 4 (2020)
- The Twisted Tale of Amanda Knox (2025), Hulu miniseries, 8 episodes
