= An Almost Ordinary Summer =

2019 comedy film

- Directed by: Simone Godano
- Screenplay by: Giulia Steigerwalt
- Produced by: Matteo Rovere; Roberto Sessa
- Starring: Alessandro Gassmann; Jasmine Trinca; Fabrizio Bentivoglio; Filippo Scicchitano
- Cinematography: Daniele Ciprì
- Edited by: Gianni Vezzosi
- Music by: Andrea Farri
- Production companies: Picomedia; Groenlandia
- Distributed by: Warner Bros. Pictures
- Release date: February 28, 2019
- Country: Italy
- Language: Italian
- Box office: $1,368,198

An Almost Ordinary Summer (Italian: Croce e delizia 'Cross and delight', something that causes both suffering and joy) is a 2019 Italian comedy film directed by Simone Godano and starring Alessandro Gassmann, Jasmine Trinca and Fabrizio Bentivoglio.

== Plot ==
Patriarch Carlo, his sons Sandro and Diego, and Sandro's young family arrive for a vacation at a rented guesthouse on the Italian coast. As a widower, the idealistic Carlo hasn't told them in a few weeks he will marry the liberal and bohemian Toni, owner of the secluded villa and guesthouse. Their families are unaware that the elderly gentlemen harbor same sex desire, much less that this desire is for each other. After an incident in the men's restroom at a local restaurant, all the adult children learn their fathers are in love. The couple's two oldest children don't take the news well.

The conservative Sandro refuses to talk to his father and will leave the next morning. Toni's snobbish daughter, Penny, fails in her attempt to dissuade her father from marriage into a boorish and homophonic family. She keeps Sandro from leaving by persuading him they can unite in a plot to stop the wedding. She enlists the aid of her conniving mother, Giulietta. Motivated by concerns that Toni's daughters will lose their inheritance, Giulietta uses her acid tongue in an attempt to convince Carlo that he is just another dalliance in a long succession of women, and a few men, who have succumbed to Toni's charms. Carlo is clearly shaken by the revelations.

As the families commingle for meals and play around the pool, they merge into an easy association, drawn closer together by the couple's unquestionable love. Carlo learns his adolescent son Diego has accepted the coming wedding with only Sandro and Penny remaining opposed. Giulietta, sensing she won a battle but lost the war, counsels Penny to accept her father for the free spirit he is.

Sandro and Penny have a heart-to-heart chat, confessing they don't know what to do next. Penny, misreading Sandro's vulnerability, kisses him. His pregnant wife walks in on them, causing a scene that draws the adult family members. In her rage she exposes the plotting going on behind the couples’ backs. A cornered Penny breaks into a panic attack as a torrential rainstorm begins. As the others run for cover, Carlo shepherds a resisting Penny into a car and drives away. Hysterical, she blames Carlo for stealing her often absent father from her just as she was finally going to have his attentions for herself.

Dawn breaks with Penny and Carlo having spent the night in deep conversation. Carlo bonds with Penny having talked her down from the ledge of panic with empathy and understanding. They arrive back at the villa. Sandro and family have left with Diego in tow, and they find Toni dozing on a sofa. He tells Carlo that the adolescent Diego is better off with Sandro. A rift opens between the couple as Carlo realizes Toni's dismissive attitude toward Diego is the same as that toward Penny during her upbringing. As he storms out, Carlo insists Toni apologize to Penny. Toni stands silent.

The three return to Rome separately. Toni and Penny reconcile and she persuades him to go in search of Carlo. They find Sandro at the family business. He takes the sea-fearing Toni in a dingy to a sand bar where the mourning Carlo spent time after his wife had died. With a heartfelt apology Toni says he hasn't canceled the wedding plans and begs Carlo to marry him. The wedding takes place at the villa. The credits roll with scenes of the newly combined family.

== Cast ==
- Alessandro Gassmann as Carlo
- Jasmine Trinca as Penny
- Fabrizio Bentivoglio as Toni
- Filippo Scicchitano as Sandro
- Lunetta Savino as Ida
- Anna Galiena as Giulietta
- Rosa Diletta Rossi as Carolina
- Clara Ponsot as Olivia
