= The Champion (2019 film) =

2019 comedy-drama film

- Directed by: Leonardo D'Agostini
- Screenplay by: Giulia Steigerwalt; Leonardo D'Agostini; Antonella Lattanzi
- Produced by: Matteo Rovere; Sydney Sibilia
- Starring: Stefano Accorsi; Andrea Carpenzano
- Cinematography: Michele Paradisi
- Edited by: Gianni Vezzosi
- Music by: Ratchev & Carratello
- Release date: 2019
- Language: Italian

The Champion (Italian: Il campione) is a 2019 Italian comedy-drama film co-written and directed by Leonardo D'Agostini, in his directorial debut.

== Plot ==
A talented but undisciplined 20-year-old football striker, Christian Ferro, has a rich contract with AS Roma, but his lack of professionalism angers the club's president, who gives him an ultimatum: either he gets his high school diploma or he will put out of the squad until his contract expires. Valerio Fioretti, a former high school teacher, is employed to assist him in this assignment.

== Cast ==
- Stefano Accorsi as Valerio Fioretti
- Andrea Carpenzano as Christian Ferro
- Ludovica Martino as Alessia
- Mario Sgueglia as Nico
- Camilla Semino Favro as Paola
- Yuliia Sobol as Sylvie
- Anita Caprioli as Cecilia
- Massimo Popolizio as Tito Rigoni
- Sergio Romano as Enzo
- Gabriel Montesi as Mauretto

== Production ==
Director Leonardo D'Agostini declared he got his inspiration for the film by Mario Balotelli's turbulent tenure at AC Milan, and by the club's decision to pair him with a tutor.

== Release ==
The film was released in Italian cinemas on 18 March 2019.

== Reception ==
The film won two Nastro d'Argento Awards, for best new director and best producer. It was also nominated for two David di Donatello Awards, for best new director and best supporting actor (Accorsi).
