= Pietro Sermonti =

Italian actor

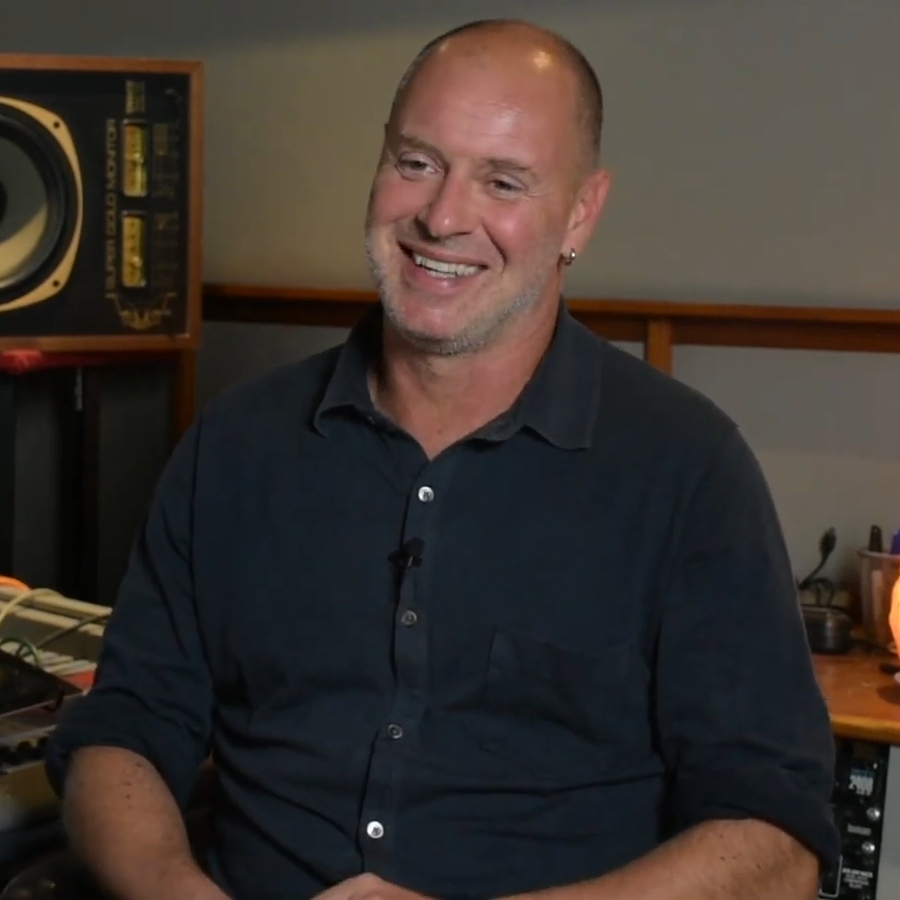
- Sermonti in 2023
- Born: 25 October 1971 (age 55); Rome, Italy
- Occupation: Actor

Pietro Sermonti (born 25 October 1971) is an Italian stage, film and television actor.

== Life and career ==
Born in Rome, Sermonti is the son of writer Vittorio Sermonti of Tuscan and Sicilian descent, and businesswoman Samaritana Rattazzi from Piedmont, a daughter of Susanna Agnelli. He was a promising footballer in the Juventus' youth team, but had to give up a professional career because of health problems. After graduating from Lycee Chateaubriand de Rome, he enrolled at several drama laboratories and attended the Lee Strasberg Theatre Institute.

Sermonti made his professional debut on stage in Quer pasticciaccio brutto de via Merulana, directed by Luca Ronconi. He had his breakout in 2003, with the role of Guido Zanin in the TV-series Un medico in famiglia. In 2007 he takes part in the TV-series Boris in the role of Stannis La Rochelle.

== Selected filmography ==
- Three Wives (2001)
- Love, Soccer and Other Catastrophes (2008)
- Un amore di strega (2009)
- Boris: The Film (2011)
- ReWined (2013)
- I Can Quit Whenever I Want (2014)
- Happily Mixed Up (2014)
- Ever Been to the Moon? (2015)
- I Can Quit Whenever I Want: Masterclass (2017)
- Couple Therapy for Cheaters (2017)
- I Can Quit Whenever I Want: Ad Honorem (2017)
- One Of The Family (2018)
- Bangla (2019)
- Angela and I (2021)
- Bangla - La serie (2022)
- Il Baracchino (2025)
- Real Men (2025)
- Un tranquillo funerale di famiglia (2026)
