= Giampaolo Morelli =

Italian actor, director, and screenwriter

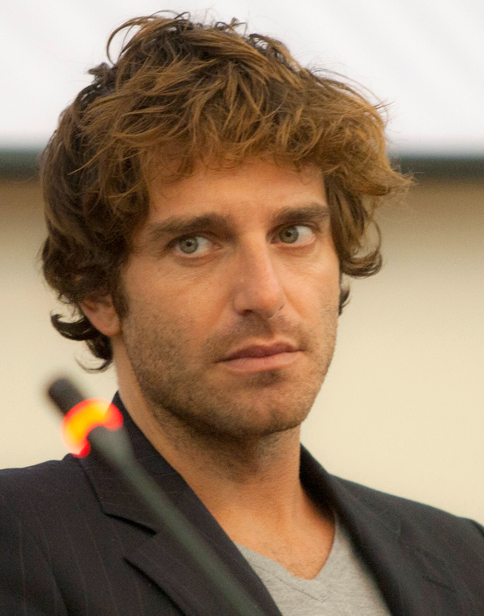
Giampaolo Morelli

Giampaolo Morelli (born 25 November 1974 in Naples) is an Italian actor, director, and screenwriter. He is particularly known for his television work; among his roles is as the title character in the L'ispettore Coliandro series.

== Filmography ==
=== Films ===
Year	Title	Role	Notes
2001	South Kensington	Antonio Pinardi	
2002	Paz!	Massimone	
2003	Ginger and Cinnamon	Andrea	
2003	Sei p. in cerca d'autore	None	Short film; screenwriter and director
2005	Amatemi	Jogging instructor	Cameo appearance
2005	Floor 17	Marco Mancini	Also screenwriter
2005	L'uomo perfetto	Paolo	
2006	L'ultima seduta	The Man	Short film
2010	Loose Cannons	Vincenzo Mancini	
2010	Tangled	Flynn Rider (voice)	Italian voice-over role
2012	Tangled Ever After	Flynn Rider (voice)	Short film
2012	Fiabeschi torna a casa	Massimone	
2012	L'isola dell'angelo caduto	The Commissary	
2013	Stay Away from Me	Mirko	
2014	Song'e Napule	Lollo Love	Also screenwriter
2015	Poli opposti	Alessandro	
2015	Babbo Natale non viene da Nord	Tommaso's father	
2016	Best Enemies Forever	Giacomo	
2016	Miami Beach	Filippo	
2016	Quel bravo ragazzo	Alfonso Marino	
2017	I Can Quit Whenever I Want: Masterclass	Lucio Napoli	
2017	I Can Quit Whenever I Want: Ad Honorem	Lucio Napoli	
2017	Love and Bullets	Ciro	
2018	Show Dogs	Max (voice)	Italian voice-over role
2018	There's No Place Like Home	Diego	
2019	L'agenzia dei bugiardi	Fred	
2019	Don't Stop Me Now	Enrico	
2019	Gli uomini d'oro	Luigi Meroni	
2020	7 ore per farti innamorare	Giulio Manfredi	Also director
2020	Divorzio a Las Vegas	Lorenzo	
2020	Maledetta primavera	Enzo	
2022	C'era una volta il crimine	Claudio Ranieri	
2022	Chip 'n Dale: Rescue Rangers	Dale (voice)	Italian voice-over role
2023	In fuga con Babbo Natale	Pasquale	

=== Television ===
Year	Title	Role	Notes
1999	Anni '60	Luigino D'Alessio	Miniseries
2000	Sei forte, maestro	Mr. Randa	Episode: "Il cattivo maestro"
2001	Una donna per amico	Marco	Episode: "Seconda puntata"
2004	Con le unghie e con i denti	Stefano	Television film
2005	Distretto di Polizia	Davide Rea	Main role (season 5); 26 episodes
2006	Crimini	Gianilberto	Episode: "Il bambino e la befana"
2006–2007	Butta la luna	Nicola Argenzi	Main role (season 1); 8 episodes
2006–2021	L'ispettore Coliandro	Inspector Coliandro	Lead role Gala della Fiction in Campania Award as Best TV Actor
2007	Il capitano	Captain Francesco Spada	Main role (season 2); 6 episodes
2008	Codice Aurora	Renzo De Nardi	Miniseries
2010	Un paradiso per due	Carlo Bramati	Television film
2013	Volare: La storia di Domenico Modugno	Walter Chiari	Miniseries
2014	Braccialetti rossi	Vale's father	Recurring role; 6 episodes
2015	Una grande famiglia	Alberto Magnano	Main role (season 3); 8 episodes
2016	Le Iene	Himself / co-host	Variety show (season 20)
2017	C'era una volta Studio Uno	Luigi Bocci	Miniseries
2019	Imma Tataranni: Deputy Prosecutor	Sergio Covaser	Episode: "L'estate del dito"

=== Music videos ===
Year	Title	Artist(s)	Notes
2011	"Il mio secondo tempo"	Max Pezzali	

=== Web shows ===
Year	Title	Role	Notes	Ref.
2026	Physical 100: Italy	Producer		
