= I Can Quit Whenever I Want: Ad Honorem =

2017 Italian crime comedy film

- Film poster
- Italian: Smetto quando voglio - Ad honorem
- Directed by: Sydney Sibilia
- Written by: Sydney Sibilia; Francesca Manieri; Luigi Di Capua
- Produced by: Domenico Procacci; Matteo Rovere
- Starring: Edoardo Leo; Valerio Aprea; Paolo Calabresi; Libero De Rienzo; Stefano Fresi; Lorenzo Lavia; Pietro Sermonti; Marco Bonini; Rosario Lisma; Giampaolo Morelli; Peppe Barra; Greta Scarano; Luigi Lo Cascio; Valeria Solarino; Neri Marcorè
- Cinematography: Vladan Radovic
- Edited by: Gianni Vezzosi
- Music by: Michele Braga
- Production companies: Fandango; Groenlandia; Rai Cinema
- Distributed by: 01 Distribution
- Release date: 30 November 2017
- Running time: 118 minutes
- Country: Italy
- Language: Italian
- Box office: $3 million

I Can Quit Whenever I Want: Ad Honorem (Italian: Smetto quando voglio - Ad honorem) is a 2017 Italian crime comedy film directed by Sydney Sibilia.

It is the third and final installment in the I Can Quit trilogy, following I Can Quit Whenever I Want and I Can Quit Whenever I Want: Masterclass.

== Cast ==
- Edoardo Leo as Pietro Zinni
- Valerio Aprea as Mattia Argeri
- Paolo Calabresi as Arturo Frantini
- Libero De Rienzo as Bartolomeo Bonelli
- Stefano Fresi as Alberto Petrelli
- Lorenzo Lavia as Giorgio Sironi
- Pietro Sermonti as Andrea De Sanctis
- Marco Bonini as Giulio Bolle
- Rosario Lisma as Vittorio
- Giampaolo Morelli as Lucio Napoli
- Peppe Barra as Angelo Seta
- Greta Scarano as Paola Coletti
- Luigi Lo Cascio as Walter Mercurio
- Valeria Solarino as Giulia
- Neri Marcorè as Claudio Felici aka "Murena"
- Francesco Acquaroli as Commissioner Galatro
- Giusy Buscemi as Alice Gentili
- Sergio Solli as Professor Camillo Seta
- Lorenzo Gioielli as Minister Pallazzo
- Raniero Monaco Di Lapio as Fabio Scotti
- Anna Bellato as Ginevra Pardi
- Giulio Maroncelli as Mercurio's henchman
- Marco Pancrazi as Mercurio's henchman
- Luca Restagno as Saverio
- Guglielmo Poggi as Maurizio
- Sergio Basile as Marcelli, the psychiatrist
- Giorgio Caputo as the insurer
