= This Is Not Hollywood =

2024 Italian television miniseries

- Italian Disney+ poster
- Italian: Avetrana - Qui non è Hollywood
- Genre: True crime; Crime drama
- Based on: Sarah: La ragazza di Avetrana by Carmine Gazzanni and Flavia Piccinni
- Written by: Pippo Mezzapesa; Antonella Gaeta; Davide Serino
- Directed by: Pippo Mezzapesa
- Starring: Federica Pala; Giulia Perulli; Paolo De Vita; Vanessa Scalera; Imma Villa; Anna Ferzetti; Giancarlo Commare; Antonio Gerardi; Leonardo Bianconi
- Ending theme: "La banalità del male" by Marracash
- Country of origin: Italy
- Original language: Italian
- No. of episodes: 4

Production
- Producer: Matteo Rovere
- Cinematography: Giuseppe Maio
- Running time: 60 minutes
- Production company: Groenlandia

Original release
- Network: Disney+
- Release: 30 October 2024

This Is Not Hollywood (Italian: Avetrana - Qui non è Hollywood) is a 2024 Italian true crime drama television miniseries based on the book Sarah: La ragazza di Avetrana by Carmine Gazzanni and Flavia Piccinni about the 2010 murder of Sarah Scazzi. It premiered at the 19th Rome Film Festival on 16 October 2024, and was released on Disney+ in Italy on 30 October 2024.

== Cast ==
- Federica Pala as Sarah Scazzi
- Giulia Perulli as Sabrina Misseri, Sarah's cousin
- Paolo De Vita as Michele Misseri, Sarah's uncle
- Vanessa Scalera as Cosima Serrano, Sarah's aunt
- Imma Villa as Concetta Serrano Spagnolo, Sarah's mother and Cosima's sister
- Anna Ferzetti as Daniela
- Giancarlo Commare as Ivano Russo
- Antonio Gerardi as Persichella
- Leonardo Bianconi as Claudio Scazzi, Sarah's brother
- Geno Diana as Bove
- Roberta Infantino as Valentina Misseri, Sabrina's sister
- Mimmo Mancini as Giacomo Scazzi
- Lorenzo Sepalone as Alessio
- Ilaria Martinelli as Mariangela

== Episodes ==
No.	Title	Duration	Original release date
1	"Sarah"	62 min	30 October 2024
2	"Sabrina"	65 min	30 October 2024
3	"Michele"	63 min	30 October 2024
4	"Cosima"	65 min	30 October 2024

== Production ==
Principal photography began in Apulia in September 2022. Filming was completed in December 2022.

== Release ==
Originally titled This Is Not Hollywood: Avetrana (Italian: Avetrana: Qui non è Hollywood), the series premiered at the 19th Rome Film Festival on 16 October 2024. It was originally scheduled to be released on Disney+ in Italy on 25 October 2024.

=== Controversy ===
On 21 October 2024, the Court of Taranto, on behalf of the mayor of Avetrana, filed an appeal to block the series' release in Italy, claiming that the use of the town's name in the series' original title could be defamatory. In the appeal, Mayor Antonio Iazzi stated, "It is essential to preview [the series] in order to determine whether the association of the town's name with the film adaptation has a defamatory effect, representing it as an ignorant, backward, silent community, possibly dedicated to committing brutal crimes of such magnitude, contrary to reality."

On 23 October 2024, the appeal was accepted and the series' Italian release was suspended. In response, Disney+ and Groenlandia stated, "We do not agree with the judges. To comply with the order issued in the absence of cross-examination between the parties by the Court of Taranto, the launch of the series currently titled Avetrana - Qui non è Hollywood is postponed."

On 29 October 2024, Disney+ and Groenlandia announced that the series' title would be changed to This Is Not Hollywood (Italian: Qui non è Hollywood). It was released on Disney+ in Italy on 30 October 2024.

== Reception ==
Vittoria Scarpa of Cineuropa wrote, "Pippo Mezzapesa's miniseries about the murder of Sarah Scazzi is an example of how a horrible true crime story can be told without morbidity and by delving into the psychology of the characters". She further wrote, "The tone is respectful, the show avoids representing the unrepresentable (the crime itself), and the psychology of the characters is deep." She also commended the performances of the cast, specifically Federica Pala, Giulia Perulli, Vanessa Scalera, Imma Villa, Anna Ferzetti, and Giancarlo Commare.
