= A Game for Girls =

- Directed by: Matteo Rovere
- Written by: Sandrone Dazieri; Teresa Ciabatti; Andrea Cotti; Matteo Rovere
- Produced by: Maurizio Totti
- Starring: Filippo Nigro; Chiara Chiti; Desirée Noferini; Nadir Caselli; Chiara Paoli
- Cinematography: Arnaldo Catinari
- Music by: Andrea Farri
- Release date: 7 November 2008
- Country: Italy
- Language: Italian

A Game for Girls (Italian: Un gioco da ragazze) is a 2008 Italian youth drama film directed by Matteo Rovere. It entered the competition at the 2008 Rome International Film Festival.

== Cast ==
- Chiara Chiti as Elena Chiantini
- Desirèe Noferini as Michela Ricasoli
- Nadir Caselli as Alice Paoletti
- Chiara Paoli as Livia Cerulli
- Filippo Nigro as Mario Landi
- Valeria Milillo as Matilde Chiantini
- Stefano Santospago as Lorenzo Chiantini

== See also ==
- List of Italian films of 2008
