= Real Men (Italian TV series) =

2025 Italian comedy-drama series

- Maschi Veri
- Genre: Comedy drama Satire
- Directed by: Letizia Lamartire; Matteo Oleotto
- Starring: Maurizio Lastrico; Matteo Martari; Francesco Montanari; Pietro Sermonti
- Country of origin: Italy
- Original language: Italian
- No. of seasons: 1
- No. of episodes: 8

Production
- Producer: Groenlandia

Original release
- Network: Netflix
- Release: May 22, 2025

Real Men (Italian: Maschi Veri) is an Italian comedy-drama streaming television series produced by Groenlandia for Netflix. The series is a remake of the Spanish production Alpha Males (Machos Alfa). Directed by Letizia Lamartire and Matteo Oleotto, the first season was released globally on May 22, 2025.

== Premise ==
Set in modern-day Rome, the story follows four middle-aged men who feel increasingly displaced by the rise of gender equality. As their traditional "alpha male" identities crumble under the weight of career setbacks and midlife crises, they reluctantly enroll in a "deconstruction" seminar. The course aims to help them shed toxic masculinity habits in an attempt to salvage their personal and professional relationships.

== Production ==
Netflix Italy commissioned the series from Banijay-owned production company Groenlandia on May 29, 2024.

Filming for the first season took place primarily in Rome, with notable locations including the Fontana dell'Acqua Paola, the Appian Way Regional Park, and the Ondina Generali Sports Club. Additional photography occurred in Southern Italy to utilize regional Baroque architecture.

In September 2025, Netflix announced the renewal of the series for a second season, with Matteo Oleotto and Milena Cocozza set to direct.

== Cast ==
- Maurizio Lastrico as Mattia
- Matteo Martari as Massimo
- Francesco Montanari as Riccardo
- Pietro Sermonti as Luigi

== Reception ==
The series received generally positive reviews for its faithfulness to the original format. John Serba of Decider gave the series a "Stream It" recommendation, noting that it "sticks to the formula" that made the original Spanish show a success. K-Waves and Beyond described the satire as "superficial" and the characters as "underdeveloped," suggesting the show works better as casual entertainment than deep social critique. Conversely, Zoom TV Entertainment called it a "must-watch," praising its ability to filter universal anxieties about aging through a specifically Italian cultural prism.
