= Amatemi =

- Directed by: Renato De Maria
- Written by: Renato De Maria; Francesco Piccolo; Doriana Leondeff
- Starring: Isabella Ferrari; Pierfrancesco Favino; Donatella Finocchiaro; Branko Đurić; Marco Giallini; Marco Cocci; Giampaolo Morelli; Camilla Filippi; Max Mazzotta; Iaia Forte; Valerio Mastandrea
- Cinematography: Alessandro Feira Chios
- Edited by: Jacopo Quadri
- Release date: 3 June 2005
- Language: Italian

Amatemi (Love Me) is a 2005 Italian drama film written and directed by Renato De Maria.

== Cast ==
- Isabella Ferrari as Nina
- Pierfrancesco Favino as Claudio
- Donatella Finocchiaro as Giulia
- Branko Đurić as Drazen
- Valerio Mastandrea as Andrea
- Camilla Filippi as Camilla
- Marco Giallini as The Married Man
- Giampaolo Morelli as Jogging instructor
- Paolo Calabresi as Paul
- Marco Cocci as David
- Max Mazzotta as Hotel Porter
