= Vincenzo Nemolato =

Italian actor (born 1989)

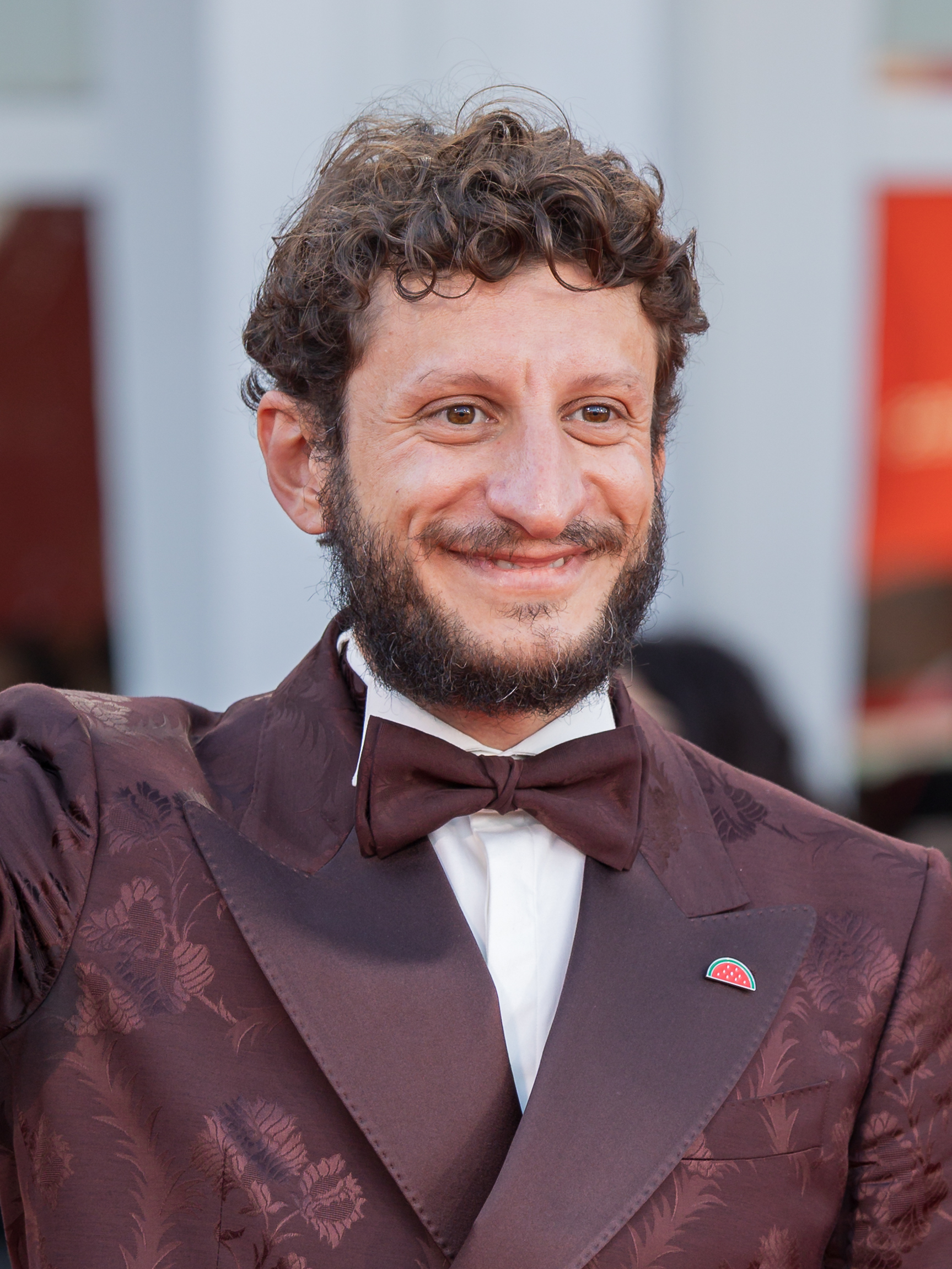
- Nemolato at the 2025 Venice International Film Festival
- Born: 10 September 1989 (age 36); Naples, Italy
- Occupation: Actor
- Years active: 2007–present

Vincenzo Nemolato (born 10 September 1989) is an Italian actor. He is best known for his roles as Pirro in Alice Rohrwacher's La chimera (2023) and as Riccardo Schicchi in the Netflix miniseries Supersex (2024).

== Biography ==
Nemolato was born in Scampia, a quarter of Naples. His father is a metalworker and his mother works for a cleaning company. His brother, Luca, is a concept artist in Los Angeles. He attended the Liceo Statale Elsa Morante in Naples. At the age of 17, he attended a theater workshop where he discovered his passion for acting. He eventually joined the Arrevuoto theater company.

== Filmography ==
=== Film ===
Year	Title	Role	Ref.
2011	Kryptonite!	Gennaro	
2015	Tale of Tales	Circus Performer #3	
2017	Let Yourself Go	Yuri	
2017	Rainbow: A Private Affair	Commander Armellin	
2018	L'eroe	Francesco	
2019	5 Is the Perfect Number	Mister Ics	
2019	Martin Eden	Nino	
2019	Paradise	Calogero	
2020	The Finch Thief	Mimi	
2022	The Shadow of the Day	Giovanni Marucci	
2022	Il pataffio	Ulfredo	
2023	La chimera	Pirro	
2024	L'isola degli idealisti	Commissioner Carrua	
2025	The Love Scam	Antonello	
2025	Duse	Memo Benassi	
2027	The Resurrection of the Christ: Part One	Matthew	
TBA	Hotel Napoli		

=== Television ===
Year	Title	Role	Notes	Ref.
2016	Gomorrah	Angelo Sepino	4 episodes	
2016	In arte Nino	Italo	Television film	
2021	Carosello Carosone	Gegè Di Giacomo	Television film	
2022	Everything Calls for Salvation	Madonnina	2 episodes	
2023	Napoli milionaria!	Amedeo	Television film	
2024	La storia	Domenico	2 episodes	
2024	Supersex	Riccardo Schicchi	3 episodes	
2024	M. Son of the Century	Victor Emmanuel III	7 episodes	
2025	Noi del Rione Sanità	Asprinio	6 episodes	
TBA	Una finestra vistalago	Tartina		

== Awards and nominations ==
Award	Year	Category	Nominated work	Result	Ref.
Nastri d'Argento Grandi Serie	2024	Best Supporting Actor	Supersex	Nominated	
