= The Best Days (film) =

2023 comedy anthology film directed by Massimiliano Bruno and Edoardo Leo

- Italian: I migliori giorni
- Directed by: Massimiliano Bruno; Edoardo Leo
- Written by: Edoardo Leo; Marco Bonini; Massimiliano Bruno; Beatrice Campagna; Salvatore Fazio; Herbert Simone Paragnani; Andrea Bassi; Gianni Corsi
- Starring: Edoardo Leo; Massimiliano Bruno; Anna Foglietta; Max Tortora; Paolo Calabresi; Luca Argentero; Valentina Lodovini; Greta Scarano; Claudia Gerini; Stefano Fresi
- Cinematography: Marco Bassano
- Edited by: Luciana Pandolfelli
- Music by: Maurizio Filardo; Gianluca Misiti
- Production companies: Italian International Film; Vision Distribution; Sky Italia
- Distributed by: Vision Distribution
- Release date: 1 January 2023 (Italy)
- Running time: 125 minutes
- Country: Italy
- Language: Italian

The Best Days (Italian: I migliori giorni) is a 2023 Italian comedy anthology film directed by Massimiliano Bruno and Edoardo Leo. The film consists of four episodes set during holidays and special occasions: Christmas Eve, New Year's Eve, Valentine's Day and International Women's Day. It features an ensemble cast including Leo, Bruno, Anna Foglietta, Max Tortora, Paolo Calabresi, Luca Argentero, Valentina Lodovini, Greta Scarano, Claudia Gerini and Stefano Fresi.

The film is part of a two-feature project with The Worst Days, released in August 2023.

== Plot ==
=== Christmas Eve ===
Politician Stefania invites a party secretary to her family's Christmas dinner in the hope of securing his support in the upcoming elections. The evening descends into chaos when her brothers Alessandro, a hypochondriac who supports vaccination, and Luca, a COVID-19 vaccine sceptic, engage in an increasingly bitter argument. Their confrontation ruins Stefania's political plans, and she eventually joins the dispute. A telephone call from their elderly father temporarily reconciles the siblings.

=== New Year's Eve ===
Wealthy businessman Bruno Amenta attends a charity dinner with his family, hoping to leave as soon as possible. A young reporter records his behaviour, forcing him to remain at the event. Alberto, his former driver, also arrives, seeking revenge after being dismissed without justification. Alberto, who has terminal cancer, exposes the hypocrisy of Bruno's public image and threatens him with a grenade until the businessman records a message admitting his indifference towards the country and the charitable activities he undertakes to protect his reputation.

=== Valentine's Day ===
Gianni maintains an affair with Clarissa while married to Sonia. Meanwhile, Daniela, who is in a relationship with Clarissa, faces unwanted advances from Sonia. Gianni attempts to arrange separate Valentine's Day dinners with his wife and his lover, but the situation becomes complicated when Daniela and Clarissa announce their intention to marry. The four eventually spend the evening at the same restaurant, with unresolved romantic tensions between them.

=== International Women's Day ===
Margherita, a television presenter whose family life is falling apart, is instructed to apologise on air for a controversial segment about the ideal woman that has been criticised as sexist. Angry at the demand, she argues with her colleague and refuses to read the prepared statement. Her daughter Erica is in hospital following a suicide attempt. After a young production assistant is fired for challenging the programme's attitude towards women, Margherita takes responsibility for the broadcast and delivers a speech in support of gender equality. Erica watches the programme from her hospital bed and reacts angrily to her mother's behaviour.

== Cast ==
- Edoardo Leo as Alessandro Felici
- Massimiliano Bruno as Luca Felici
- Anna Foglietta as Stefania Felici
- Max Tortora as Bruno Amenta
- Paolo Calabresi as Alberto
- Luca Argentero as Gianni
- Valentina Lodovini as Sonia
- Greta Scarano as Daniela
- Claudia Gerini as Margherita Spinesi
- Stefano Fresi as Paolo Sgarbossa
- Marco Bonini as Carlo
- Maria Chiara Centorami as Clarissa
- Ludovica Martino as Carolina
- Liliana Fiorelli as Giù
- Tiberio Timperi as Martino
- Pietro De Silva as Attilio
- Giorgia Salari as Benedetta Francesconi
- Mariachiara Di Mitri as Martina Amenta
- Daniele Locci as Matteo
- Roberta Pompili as Lisa
- Patrizio Cigliano as Loris
- Anna D'Alessio as Erica
- Maurizio Lops as Antonio Magotti
- Malvina Ruggiano as Susan
- Andrea Venditti as the production assistant
- Jonis Bascir as the nurse
- Laline Cafaro as Alice
- Giovanni Cipolletta as Sasà
- Sergio Zecca as Remo
- Giuseppe Ragone as Renato
- Prince Manujibeya as Bubakar
- Claudia Perna as Marianna
