= The Law According to Lidia Poët =

Italian historical drama television series (2023–present)

- Italian Netflix poster
- Italian: La legge di Lidia Poët
- Genre: Crime drama; Legal drama; Erotic romance
- Created by: Guido Iuculano; Davide Orsini
- Written by: Guido Iuculano; Davide Orsini; Elisa Dondi; Daniela Gambaro; Paolo Piccirillo
- Directed by: Matteo Rovere; Letizia Lamartire
- Starring: Matilda De Angelis; Eduardo Scarpetta; Pier Luigi Pasino; Sinéad Thornhill; Sara Lazzaro; Dario Aita; Gianmarco Saurino
- Composer: Massimiliano Mechelli
- Country of origin: Italy
- Original language: Italian
- No. of seasons: 3
- No. of episodes: 18

Production
- Executive producer: Paolo Lucarini
- Producer: Matteo Rovere
- Cinematography: Vladan Radovic; Francesco Scazzosi
- Editors: Gianni Vezzosi; Pietro Morana
- Running time: 40–57 minutes
- Production company: Groenlandia

Original release
- Network: Netflix
- Release: 15 February 2023 – 15 April 2026

The Law According to Lidia Poët (Italian: La legge di Lidia Poët) is an Italian historical crime drama television series created by Guido Iuculano and Davide Orsini, loosely based on the life of Lidia Poët, the first modern female lawyer in Italy. The first season was released on Netflix on 15 February 2023. The second season was released on 30 October 2024. The third and final season was released on 15 April 2026.

== Premise ==
In 1883, Lidia Poët is the first and only female lawyer in Italy, but an appellate court in Turin rules that practicing law is not a woman's job, disbarring her. Lidia finds a job at her brother's law firm while preparing her appeal to overturn the court's decision.

== Cast ==
=== Main ===
- Matilda De Angelis as Lidia Poët (seasons 1–3): the first female lawyer in Italy, disbarred because the Torinese Court of Appeals determines that women are not qualified to practice law. She helps her brother Enrico with his cases and works on an appeal to overturn her disbarment.
  - Mia McGovern Zaini as young Lidia
- Eduardo Scarpetta as Jacopo Barberis (seasons 1–3): a journalist and a rebel spirit of socialist ideas; his sister Teresa married Enrico Poët.
- Pier Luigi Pasino as Enrico Poët (seasons 1–3): Lidia's brother, a lawyer who initially does not support Lidia's progressive ideas.
- Sinéad Thornhill as Marianna Poët (seasons 1–2; guest season 3): Teresa and Enrico's daughter and Lidia and Jacopo's niece; she admires Lidia for her courage and free will.
- Sara Lazzaro as Teresa Poët née Barberis (seasons 1–3): Enrico's conservative wife who does not approve of Lidia's ideas.
- Dario Aita as Andrea Caracciolo (season 1; guest season 2): a trader and Lidia's lover who insists that she follow him to America where she will be free to practice law.
- Gianmarco Saurino as Pierluigi Fourneau (seasons 2–3): Turin's new Attorney General and Lidia's new love interest.

=== Recurring ===
- Alessia Spinelli as Albertina (seasons 1–2): the Poëts' handmaid.
- Aldo Ottobrino as Judge Genovesi (season 1): a judge in Turin's court.
- Francesco Biscione as the King's Prosecutor (season 2): the public prosecutor in Turin's court.
- Jacopo Crovella as Attila Brusaferro (season 1; guest season 2): a journalist working with Jacopo at the Gazzetta Piemontese.
- Camille Dugay as Nicole (season 1): Jacopo's ex-lover and a French anarchist on the run.
- Alessandro Federico as Lidia and Enrico's father (season 1).
- Olga Rossi as Lidia and Enrico's mother (season 1).
- Matteo De Mojana as the medical examiner (seasons 1–2).
- Sebastiano Fumagalli as Lorenzo Manera (season 1; guest season 2): the Poëts' gardener and Marianna's secret boyfriend.
- Fabrizio Odetto as the prison guard (season 1): a military working as a prison guard at Le Nuove.
- Roberta Mengozzi as Maya Cristallo alias Giorgia Villa (season 1): a prostitute and undercover spy working for General Valery against the anarchist movement.
- Paolo Briguglia as Filippo Cravero (season 2): a senator who supports Lidia's progressive ideas.
- Valentina Cervi as Anna Cravero (season 2): Sen. Cravero's wife, Lidia's friend and herself an activist for women's right to vote.
- Andrea Palma as Cesare Brusaferro (season 2): Attila's stepbrother.
- Mario Pirrello as Antonio Juvarra (season 2): the director of the Bank of Turin.
- Francesco Cavallo as Paolo Marchisio Savoldi Silioli, Duke of Belgiojoso (season 2): Marianna's new love interest.
- Andrea Bruschi as Duke Alfonso (season 2): Paolo's father
- Magdalena Grochowska as Duchess Maria Vittoria Marchisio Savoldi Silioli of Belgiojoso (season 2): Paolo's mother, who is a first cousin of Queen Margherita of Savoy.
- Francesco Ferdinandi as Mario Garrone (season 2): a hitman hired by the conjurers.

== Episodes ==
=== Series overview ===
Series	Episodes	Originally released
1	6	15 February 2023
2	6	30 October 2024
3	6	15 April 2026

=== Season 1 ===
No. overall	No. in season	Title	Duration	Original release date
1	1	"Episode 1.1"	52 min	15 February 2023
In 1883, the young Torinese Lidia Poët is the only woman qualified to practise law in the Kingdom of Italy. She accepts the task of defending Pietro Baiocchi, charged with the murder of his lover, dancer Adele Valery. However, the city's Appeals Court disbars Poët on the basis of her gender, stating that practicing law is not appropriate for a woman. Lidia moves in with her brother Enrico, also a lawyer, and becomes his assistant. She also becomes the role model of her niece Marianna, and meets Enrico's brother-in-law, journalist and dandy Jacopo Barberis. Lidia investigates Baiocchi's case and uncovers the truth, bringing the real murderer to justice and ensuring that Enrico takes the credit for it. She starts working on her appeal against her disbarment.
2	2	"Episode 1.2"	40 min	15 February 2023
While Enrico is abroad, Lidia accepts on his behalf the case of Anita Tosetti, a chocolate factory anarchist worker who has been charged with the murder of Elena De Santis — the factory owner's wife. When he returns, Enrico finds that Lidia has forged his signature to accept the Tosetti case. Lidia determines that Elena was the real head of the factory, and not her husband, Commendator Guido, and that she had a relationship with Anita. Lidia and a reluctant Enrico unmask the real murderer in front of De Santis. However, the Attorney general warns the Poëts for circumventing the Court's ruling and bans Lidia from even accessing the courts.
3	3	"Episode 1.3"	40 min	15 February 2023
Vittorio Muraro arrives at the Poëts' saying that he killed his father. The Muraros are friends of the Poët family, and now inhabit the mansion that used to belong to Lidia and Enrico's father. Lidia was destined to marry Alberto, Vittorio's brother, before she broke the engagement to study law. At the Muraro mansion, Vittorio is interrogated by the Attorney general and admits the murderer, that he claims has committed after having smoked opium. Lidia and Jacopo find that a necklace has been stolen but has not been found on Vittorio, and later discover a secret room behind the study that used to belong to Lidia's father. Lidia and Enrico find the real murderer; but Lidia also finds a letter from her father to Mr Muraro, in which he agrees to make Lidia marry Alberto in exchange for the cancellation of his gambling debts. When Lidia broke the contract, Poët sold the mansion to Muraro for a low price. Shocked, Enrico agrees to help Lidia with her appeal.
4	4	"Episode 1.4"	40 min	15 February 2023
Margherita Sangiacomo, a chemist, is accused of having killed her professor, Braschi, and is awaiting the capital sentence in a convent, having fallen ill in prison. Lidia convinces her to hire Enrico as her defender. Braschi and his colleagues used to conduct experiments for a medicine against scarlet fever, using prostitutes as human guinea pigs — including Sangiacomo's mother.
5	5	"Episode 1.5"	40 min	15 February 2023
Sangiacomo asks Lidia to defend Azzurra, a prostitute, accused of having killed one of her clients, wealthy entrepreneur Achille Castelnuovo. Meanwhile, Marianna and Pietro, the Poëts' gardener, have fallen in love and have been caught kissing by Teresa, who dismisses Pietro. Lidia investigates the Azzurra case and, with the help of Vera Cressphal, a medium, finds the real murder and has him arrested with a stratagem. That evening, Jacopo is arrested.
6	6	"Episode 1.6"	40 min	15 February 2023
Jacopo is charged with the murder of Maya Cristallo, a prostitute. In prison, Jacopo confesses to Lidia that he has been helping his former lover, French anarchist Nicole, and her new partner Louis, who are on the run. Marianna and Pietro insist that their relationship is sincere, and want to marry. Lidia learns that Maya's real name was Giorgia Villa, and that she had also been an anarchist in Paris, before turning to spy for the Régime. In Turin, she has been working undercover for General Valery infiltrating the anarchist circles. Lidia finds that Giorgia had turned Nicole and Louis in when she was in Paris, and deduces that they have escaped and travelled to Turin only to seek revenge on Giorgia. Lidia confronts the Frenchmen on a train as they are escaping, killing Louis and convincing Nicole to confess. Jacopo is released; but the Court of Cassation rejects Lidia's appeal. In despair, she leaves her brother's house to follow Andrea to America.

=== Season 2 ===
No. overall	No. in season	Title	Duration	Original release date
7	1	"Episode 2.1"	57 min	30 October 2024
Two years after Lidia's disbarment, the Poët family has moved to Turin after Jacopo has sold their mansion to fund his own newspaper. This has caused tensions between Jacopo and Enrico and Lidia, who remains in Italy. She is now an activist for women's rights and is arrested for pretending to be enlisted in her town's electoral college. The new prosecutor, Pierluigi Fourneau, releases her because Attila Brusaferro has been found dead with two puzzling messages for Jacopo and Lidia, and the only suspect is Attila's brother. As she investigates and unveils the truth, Lidia and Jacopo disband a gang of racists; but the true killer commits suicide without explaining the reason for his crime. In the meantime, Enrico and Teresa learn that Marianna is dating the young Duke Paolo Marchisio di Belgiojoso, and Lidia works on a new law for women's rights.
8	2	"Episode 2.2"	57 min	30 October 2024
Laura, a young student in a boarding school for young ladies, is accused of fatally poisoning her classmate Beatrice. Lidia investigates the case upon Teresa's request, who is friends with Laura's family. At the same time, Jacopo investigates Attila's murder, and the Poëts are introduced to Paolo's parents, Duke Alfonso and Duchess Maria Vittoria Marchisio di Belgiojoso.
9	3	"Episode 2.3"	56 min	30 October 2024
A serial killer is targeting women in Turin. Fourneau asks Lidia to work on the case as an informal consultant. Lidia is introduced to Sen. Filippo Cravero, a supporter of women's suffrage, and the two try to convince Enrico to run for the Chamber of Deputies to support Lidia's proposed law. With the help of Cesare Lombroso, Lidia stops the killer. She and Fourneau share a kiss. Marianna learns the truth about Lorenzo and moves in with Lidia. Jacopo, refusing to speak to her parents again, and Lidia is asked to be the intermediary. Jacopo continues working on Attila's murder, suspecting a connection with banker Antonio Juvarra and his ex-secretary Umberto Nitti.
10	4	"Episode 2.4"	55 min	30 October 2024
Andrea Caracciolo returns from America to marry his fiancée Letizia. However, a man is found dead during the party, and Letizia is the principal suspect. Lidia uncovers the truth: the man was thug to an usurer, and had had a relationship and a son with Letizia. To free Letizia, Andrea takes the guilt and leaves for Switzerland. During a lunch with the Marchisios, Enrico accepts Lidia's proposal to run for Parliament and a marriage contract is issued; later, Enrico delivers a speech to the electoral college. Jacopo continues investigating Attila's murder and arrives at Nitti.
11	5	"Episode 2.5"	51 min	30 October 2024
Bruno Corsi escapes from Le Nuove, and is accused of killing a guard. Fourneau asks the Poëts to defend Corsi, as he is convinced that a gang of corrupt guards has framed him. Lidia's relationship with Fourneau progresses. Meanwhile, Jacopo tracks Nitti down, but the man is killed before Jacopo can ask him about the content of certain documents that Attila Brusaferro died searching.
12	6	"Episode 2.6"	52 min	30 October 2024
Enrico wins the elections, but Marianna unexpectedly breaks the contract marriage with Paolo Marchisio because she still is in love with Lorenzo. Jacopo plans on moving to Rome to start a socialist newspaper. Fourneau finds the documents that Attila Brusaferro had hidden, and arrests Garrone; the killer hired by a clique of conspirators against prime minister Agostino Depretis. Juvarra and the other conspirators are arrested. Jacopo leaves for Rome, Cesare follows him, but Lidia — still in love with Jacopo, but determined to retain her freedom — remains in Turin.

=== Season 3 ===
No. overall	No. in season	Title	Duration	Original release date
13	1	"Episode 3.1"	51 min	15 April 2026
Lidia takes on the case of a murdered trapeze artist at a traveling gypsy circus and discovers that the deceased had been the victim of an overdose perpetrated by her best friend, who tried to prevent her from moving to a rival circus and miscalculated on the dosage. Lidia is reunited with Jacopo, who brings along his girlfriend, Consuelo, and Lidia's best friend, Grazia, who seeks refuge at the Poët residence with her daughter Mila from her abusive husband Guido, an army officer. As Lidia and Enrico discuss how to emancipate Grazia, Guido shows up and asks to speak privately with his wife. Moments later, a scream is heard, and the Poëts stumble upon a bruised Grazia standing upon Guido's corpse.
14	2	"Episode 3.2"	50 min	15 April 2026
Grazia invokes self-defense over Guido's killing, but struggles to convince the prosecutors and is jailed, prompting Lidia to search for witnesses who can speak in her favor. Enrico is asked by a colleague in parliament to help a homosexual painter, Luigi, who is caught red-handed carrying the corpse of his murdered lover, Elio. Lidia discovers that the victim had been killed in a case of mistaken identity and provides evidence to Enrico in exchange for him agreeing to defend Grazia, only for Luigi to take the blame rather than be exposed as a fraud whose artworks were made by Elio. Guido’s brother, Pietro, takes custody of Mila.
15	3	"Episode 3.3"	50 min	15 April 2026
Grazia’s trial for homicide begins with Fourneau, the lead prosecutor, showing a telegram by her appearing to invite Guido to the Poëts‘ residence. Lidia harbors doubts when Grazia firmly denies messaging her husband. Lidia and Enrico defend their maid Albertina’s cousin, who is framed for the murder of a boxer, Nino, and find that Nino’s sister, Romilda, saw his brother’s manager kill him after she naively reported him for going against a rigged match. Romilda’s testimony makes Lidia realize that Mila sent the telegram in Grazia’s name in an attempt to fix her family’s situation, which Mila confirms in court.
16	4	"Episode 3.4"	50 min	15 April 2026
Tulio Munnari, a doctor who witnesses Grazia suffering injuries from domestic abuse, is arrested on charges of murdering his sister Eloisa before he could testify in Grazia’s case, forcing an adjournment of proceedings. Lidia and Enrico learn that Tulio and Eloisa had a dispute over finances, while a lead at a bar where Eloisa worked brings them to a Carabinieri report in which Eloisa complained of being followed by a different suspect, Bottini. Lidia and Enrico track down Bottini, who reveals that it was Tulio’s wife who ordered Eloisa dead. Tulio is released, but his testimony is discredited after Fourneau reveals that the doctor and Grazia were having an affair. Meanwhile, Lidia and Enrico convince Cesare Lombroso to conduct a psychological assessment on Grazia, but Grazia inadvertently reveals that she sabotaged an attempt by Lidia’s father to reconcile with her, resulting in a falling-out with Lidia.
17	5	"Episode 3.5"	49 min	15 April 2026
Lidia and Fourneau’s affair is exposed in the press, forcing Enrico to evict Lidia from his house after a falling out. Lidia is asked by a former classmate to defend a minor accused of murdering his school teacher, during which she finds that another boy's parent is responsible. Lidia breaks up with Fourneau, reconciles with Grazia, and falls back for Jacopo until she reads a letter from Teresa announcing that Jacopo had unknowingly impregnated Consuelo.
18	6	"Episode 3.6"	56 min	15 April 2026
Following a tip, Lidia, Enrico and Jacopo visit the Fontanas' countryside villa. They encounter an eccentric, Roberto, who tells them that Guido brought with him from Eritrea a native girl named Amira whom he treated as a sex slave years before. Roberto fell in love with Amira and resolved to elope, only for Amira to disappear and Guido to move away. The local Carabinieri commander, Piovano stonewalls Lidia and his group, leading Lidia and Jacopo to return to the villa. They encounter Piovano trying to dispose of Amira's skeleton, confirming that Guido killed her. Piovano escapes and locks the duo in the cellar, during which Lidia tells Jacopo of Consuelo's pregnancy. A worried Enrico and Consuelo return to the villa to rescue the two, but not before Lidia manages to escape through a tunnel while having a premonition of her being readmitted as a lawyer in the future. The discovery of Amira's body turns public opinion in favor of Grazia, resulting in her acquittal. Consuelo finally breaks up with Jacopo after the latter confesses that he still loves Lidia, leading him and Lidia to admit that they would be unhappily in love with each other. After the courtroom empties, Lidia contemplates on her premonition and tries on her judicial robes.

== Production ==
The series is filmed in Turin, with specific filming locations including Parco del Valentino, Palazzo Barolo, Piazza Cavour, and the Carceri Nuove. Filming on the second season began in June 2023.

== Release ==
The first season was released on Netflix on 15 February 2023. In June 2023, Netflix confirmed that the series had been renewed for a second season. The second season, consisting of six episodes, was released on 30 October 2024. In December 2024, Netflix confirmed that the series had been renewed for a third season, which was released on 15 April 2026.

=== Controversies ===
The series was criticized by Lidia Poët's grandnephew for sexualizing Poët and obfuscating her Waldensian origins, its use of foul language, and its lack of historical context.

== Awards and nominations ==
Award	Year	Category	Nominee	Result	Ref.
Critics' Choice Television Awards	2025	Best Foreign Language Series	The Law According to Lidia Poët	Nominated	
Nastri d'Argento Grandi Serie	2023	Best Crime Series	The Law According to Lidia Poët	Won	
Nastri d'Argento Grandi Serie	2023	Best Actress	Matilda De Angelis	Nominated	
