= Best Enemies Forever =

2016 film

- Film poster
- Italian: Nemiche per la pelle
- Directed by: Luca Lucini
- Written by: Doriana Leondeff; Francesca Manieri
- Produced by: Donatella Botti
- Starring: Margherita Buy; Claudia Gerini; Giampaolo Morelli; Paolo Calabresi
- Cinematography: Claudio Cofrancesco
- Edited by: Massimo Fiocchi
- Music by: Fabrizio Campanelli
- Release date: 14 April 2016
- Running time: 92 minutes
- Country: Italy
- Language: Italian

Best Enemies Forever (Italian: Nemiche per la pelle) is a 2016 Italian comedy film directed by Luca Lucini.

== Plot ==
Two woman - Lucia (played by Margherita Buy) and Fabiola (played by Claudia Gerini) - end up with joint custody of their ex-husband's child.

Lucia is an animal psychologist. Fabiola is a estate developer. Their ex-husband Paolo died and at his funeral they discover that they are given join custody of his son - Paolo Jr.

Things are rocky at first, but when the government threatens to take the child, both women band together to protect him.

== Cast ==
- Margherita Buy as Lucia.
- Claudia Gerini as Fabiola.
- Giampaolo Morelli as Giacomo.
- Paolo Calabresi as Stefano.
- Gigio Morra as Attilio.
- Lucia Ragni as Mrs. Innocenti.
- Andrea Bosca as Ruggero.
- Mihaela Irina Dorlan as Ambra.
- Jasper Cabal as Paolo Jr.
