= Supersex =

2024 Italian television miniseries

- Netflix poster
- Genre: Drama
- Created by: Francesca Manieri
- Written by: Francesca Manieri
- Directed by: Matteo Rovere; Francesco Carrozzini; Francesca Mazzoleni
- Starring: Alessandro Borghi; Jasmine Trinca; Adriano Giannini; Saul Nanni; Enrico Borelli; Vincenzo Nemolato; Francesco Pellegrino; Gaia Messerklinger; Jade Pedri; Linda Caridi; Eva Cela
- Composer: Ralf Hildenbeutel
- Country of origin: Italy
- Original language: Italian (Note: With some dialogue in French and English)
- No. of episodes: 7

Production
- Cinematography: Daria D'Antonio
- Running time: 42–55 minutes
- Production companies: The Apartment Pictures; Groenlandia; Small Forward Productions

Original release
- Network: Netflix
- Release: 6 March 2024

Supersex is a 2024 Italian biographical drama television miniseries loosely based on the life of Rocco Siffredi, a famous Italian pornographic film actor. It was released on Netflix on 6 March 2024.

== Cast ==
- Alessandro Borghi as Rocco Siffredi
  - Saul Nanni as young Rocco
- Jasmine Trinca as Lucia
  - Eva Cela as young Lucia
- Adriano Giannini as Tommaso, Rocco's half-brother
  - Francesco Pellegrino as young Tommaso
- Enrico Borello as Gabriele
- Vincenzo Nemolato as Riccardo Schicchi
- Gaia Messerklinger as Moana Pozzi
- Jade Pedri as Sylvie
- Linda Caridi as Tina

== Episodes ==
No.	Title	Directed by	Written by	Original release date
1	"Superpower" (Il superpotere)	Matteo Rovere	Francesca Manieri	6 March 2024
2	"The Flesh" (La carne)	Francesca Mazzoleni	Francesca Manieri	6 March 2024
3	"The Beast" (L'animale)	Francesco Carrozzini	Francesca Manieri	6 March 2024
4	"The Dream" (Il sogno)	Matteo Rovere	Francesca Manieri	6 March 2024
5	"The Island" (L'isola)	Francesca Mazzoleni	Francesca Manieri	6 March 2024
6	"Resurrection of the Bodies" (Resurrezione dei corpi)	Matteo Rovere	Francesca Manieri	6 March 2024
7	"The Cock Comes Last" (Ultimo viene il cazzo)	Francesco Carrozzini	Francesca Manieri	6 March 2024

== Production ==
In September 2022, it was announced that the series had been greenlit and filming had begun in Rome. Regarding the series, Rocco Siffredi commented, "This beautiful story is inspired by my life, but it is not my life... Everything you will see in Supersex originates from me, but then the writer [Francesca Manieri] put a lot of herself into it."

Actor Alessandro Borghi stated that he filmed 50 sex scenes in 95 days for the series.

== Release ==
Netflix released promotional images for the series in December 2023. A teaser trailer was released in mid-January 2024, featuring a remixed version of "Stripped" by Depeche Mode.

The series premiered at the 74th Berlin International Film Festival before being released on Netflix on 6 March 2024.

== Reception ==
Aramide Tinubu of Variety called the series "an overly complex examination of relationships and the vices people indulge in to escape their emotional turmoil" and wrote, "Though Rocco's story is solidly depicted, audiences hoping for a bio-series-type narrative won't find it here."

== Awards and nominations ==
Year	Award	Category	Nominee	Result	Ref.
2024	Nastri D'Argento Grandi Serie	Best Drama Series	Supersex	Nominated	
2024	Nastri D'Argento Grandi Serie	Best Supporting Actress	Linda Caridi	Won	
