= The Chair of Happiness =

- Directed by: Carlo Mazzacurati
- Written by: Carlo Mazzacurati; Doriana Leondeff; Marco Pettenello
- Produced by: Angelo Barbagallo
- Starring: Valerio Mastandrea; Isabella Ragonese; Giuseppe Battiston
- Cinematography: Luca Bigazzi
- Music by: Mark Orton
- Distributed by: 01 Distribution
- Release date: 24 November 2013 (Torino)
- Running time: 94 minutes
- Country: Italy
- Language: Italian

The Chair of Happiness (Italian: La sedia della felicità) is a 2013 Italian comedy film written and directed by Carlo Mazzacurati, starring Valerio Mastandrea and Isabella Ragonese. It premiered at the 2013 Torino Film Festival.

== Cast ==
- Valerio Mastandrea as Dino
- Isabella Ragonese as Bruna
- Giuseppe Battiston as Father Weiner
- Antonio Albanese as Dante Becchin's Sons
- Raul Cremona as Casimiro Foggia aka Kasimir the Magician
- Cosimo Messeri as Alex Pavelka
- Marco Marzocca as the florist
- Milena Vukotic as Armida Barbisan
- Natalino Balasso as Volpato
- Mirko Artuso as Bepin Lievore
- Roberto Abbiati as Giani
- Lucia Mascino as Elisa
- Katia Ricciarelli as Norma Pecche
- Roberto Citran as the fishmonger
- Fabrizio Bentivoglio as the art critic
- Silvio Orlando as the art vendor

== Production ==
The film was shot in Jesolo, Padua, the Euganean Hills, Abano Terme and the mountains of Trentino.

== Release ==
The film premiered at the 31st edition of the Turin Film Festival. It was released in theaters on April 24, 2014.

== Awards and nominations ==
The film won the Silver Ribbon of the Year 2014. It also received eight David di Donatello nominations, including awards for Best Director, Best Supporting Actress (Milena Vukotic), Best Supporting Actor (Giuseppe Battiston) and Best Film.
