= Couple Therapy for Cheaters =

- Theatrical release poster
- Directed by: Alessio Maria Federici.
- Written by: Alessio Maria Federici; Diego De Silva
- Produced by: Luigi Musini; Olivia Musini
- Starring: Ambra Angiolini; Pietro Sermonti; Sergio Rubini
- Cinematography: Michele D'Attanasio
- Edited by: Consuelo Catucci
- Music by: Rodrigo D'Erasmo
- Production companies: Cinemaundici; Ela Film; Warner Bros. Entertainment Italia
- Distributed by: Warner Bros. Pictures
- Release date: 26 October 2017
- Running time: 97 minutes
- Country: Italy
- Language: Italian
- Box office: $2.3 million

Couple Therapy for Cheaters (Italian: Terapia di coppia per amanti) is a 2017 Italian comedy film directed by Alessio Maria Federici.

== Cast ==
- Ambra Angiolini as Viviana
- Pietro Sermonti as Modesto Fracasso
- Sergio Rubini as Prof. Vittorio Malavolta
- Franco Branciaroli as Ferdinando Fracasso
- Anna Ferzetti as Nelide
- Anita Kravos as Elena
- Filippo Gili as Paolo
- Fulvio Falzarano as Augusto
- Antonio Pennarella as Larry
- Eugenia Costantini as Nina
- Rocco Fasano as Eric Fracasso
- Alan Sorrenti as himself
