= Like Sheep Among Wolves =

2023 film

- Directed by: Lyda Patitucci
- Screenplay by: Filippo Gravino
- Produced by: Enrico Cerabino; Matteo Rovere
- Starring: Isabella Ragonese; Andrea Arcangeli
- Cinematography: Giuseppe Maio
- Edited by: Giuseppe Trepiccione
- Music by: Ginevra Nervi
- Release date: 2023
- Language: Italian

Like Sheep Among Wolves (Italian: Come pecore in mezzo ai lupi) is a 2023 Italian thriller film directed by Lyda Patitucci, at her feature film debut.

== Plot ==
Stefania is an undercover police officer who infiltrated an Italian-Serbian gang of criminals. She discovers the involvement of her brother Bruno, who recently got out of prison and whom she had not seen for years.

== Cast ==
- Isabella Ragonese as Stefania/Vera
- Andrea Arcangeli as Bruno
- Clara Ponsot as Janine
- Tommaso Ragno as Sante
- Carolina Michelangeli as Marta
- Gennaro Di Colandrea as Gaetano
- Aleksandar Gavranic as Goran
- Alan Katić as Dragan
- Miloš Timotijević as Milorad
- Gabriele Portoghese as Di Franco
- Imma Villa as Ester

== Production ==
The film was produced by Matteo Rovere's company Groenlandia, with whom Patitucci often collaborated as second-unit director, notably in The First King: Birth of an Empire and Italian Race. It was shot in Rome, and had among its locations EUR, Villaggio Olimpico and the Aniene river area. As to perform his role, Andrea Arcangeli lost 15 kilos.

== Release ==
The film premiered at the 52nd edition of the International Film Festival Rotterdam, in the Harbor sidebar. It was released in Italian cinemas on 13 July 2023.

== Reception ==
For this film Isabella Ragonese was nominated for best actress at the 69th edition of the David di Donatello awards.
