= Paolo Calabresi =

Italian actor (born 1964)

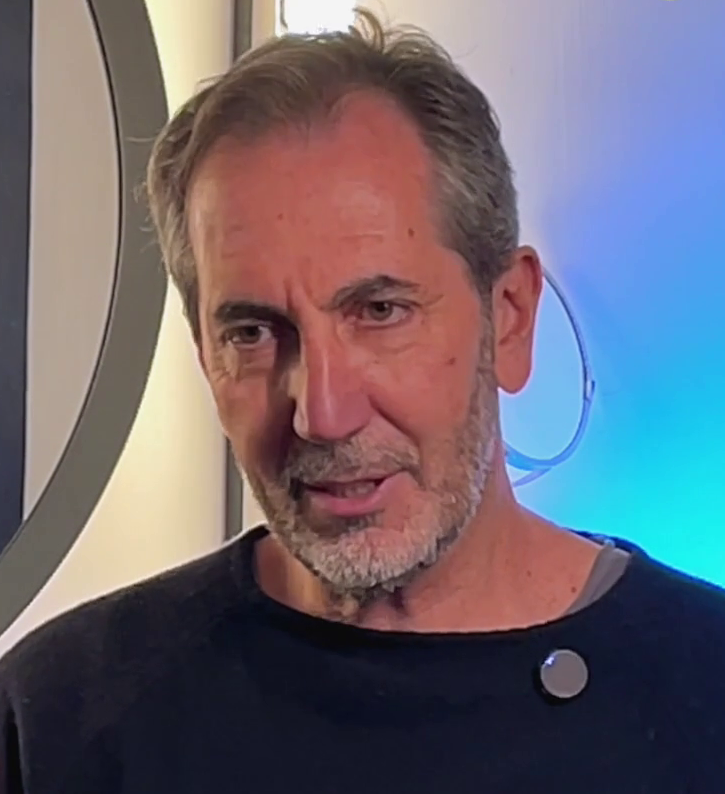
- Calabresi in 2025
- Born: 17 June 1964 (age 62); Rome, Italy
- Occupation: Actor

Paolo Calabresi (born 17 June 1964) is an Italian actor and television presenter.

== Life and career ==
Born in Rome, Calabresi studied at the drama school of the Piccolo Teatro in Milan. He started his career on stage, where among others he worked with Giorgio Strehler, Luca Ronconi, Mario Missiroli, Giorgio Albertazzi. He made his film debut in 1995, in Umberto Marino's Heartless.

Calabresi had his breakout in the second half of the 2000s, thanks to the participation in the Italia 1 TV-show Le Iene and to the role of Biascica in the comedy series Boris. In 2008, he co-wrote and hosted the one-man-show Italian Job on La7. Among his better-known roles, there is the archaeologist Arturo Frantini in the I Can Quit Whenever I Want film trilogy.

=== Personal life ===
Calabresi is married and has four children. He is the father of footballer Arturo Calabresi.

== Selected filmography ==
=== Film ===
- Heartless (1995)
- The Talented Mr. Ripley (1999)
- Instructing the Heart (2003)
- Il pranzo della domenica (2004)
- Amatemi (2005)
- Ice on Fire (2006)
- I Viceré (2007)
- Night Bus (2007)
- Bets and Wedding Dresses (2009)
- Clash of Civilizations Over an Elevator in Piazza Vittorio (2010)
- Ti presento un amico (2010)
- Boris - Il film (2011)
- Diaz – Don't Clean Up This Blood (2012)
- A Perfect Family (2012)
- Blame Freud (2014)
- I Can Quit Whenever I Want (2014)
- Do You Remember Me? (2014)
- Tutto molto bello (2014)
- Best Enemies Forever (2014)
- Un Natale stupefacente (2014)
- The Correspondence (2016)
- How to Grow Up Despite Your Parents (2016)
- I Can Quit Whenever I Want: Masterclass (2017)
- I Can Quit Whenever I Want: Ad Honorem (2017)
- Dreamfools (2018)
- L'agenzia dei bugiardi (2019)
- Parents in Progress (2019)
- Figli (2020)
- School of Mafia (2021)
- Help! My In-Laws Are Vampires! (2021)
- The Best Days (2023)
- A Freaking Wedding! (2023)
- Kidnapped (2023)
- Diabolik: Who Are You? (2023)
- The Great Ambition (2024)
- Still Sexy (2026)

=== Television ===
- Moses (miniseries, 1995)
- Padre Pio: Miracle Man (miniseries, 2000)
- Compagni di scuola (TV series, 2001)
- Distretto di Polizia (TV series, 2003, 2011)
- Saint John Bosco: Mission to Love (miniseries, 2004)
- Boris (TV series, 2007–2010, 2022)
- Ho sposato uno sbirro (TV series, 2008)
- Il restauratore (TV series, 2012–2014)
- Baby (TV series, 2018)
- Luna Park (miniseries, 2021)
- Sono Lillo (TV series, 2023–2024)
- The Leopard (TV series, 2024)
