= Mixed by Erry =

- Directed by: Sydney Sibilia
- Screenplay by: Sydney Sibilia; Armando Festa
- Produced by: Sydney Sibilia; Matteo Rovere
- Starring: Luigi D'Oriano; Giuseppe Arena; Emanuele Palumbo; Francesco Di Leva; Cristiana Dell'Anna; Adriano Pantaleo; Chiara Celotto; Greta Esposito; Fabrizio Gifuni
- Cinematography: Valerio Azzali
- Edited by: Gianni Vezzosi
- Music by: Michele Braga
- Distributed by: 01 Distribution
- Release date: 2023
- Running time: 111 minutes
- Language: Italian

Mixed by Erry is a 2023 Italian biographical comedy film co-written and directed by Sydney Sibilia. It is based on real life events surrounding three Neapolitan brothers who established a successful piracy record label between late 1970s and mid-1990s.

== Plot ==
The story takes place between the late 1970s and the early '90s. Enrico, Peppe, and Angelo Frattasio are three brothers from Forcella, a neighborhood in Naples, who live in very modest conditions: their father Pasquale smuggles tea by passing it off as whiskey. Enrico has a passion for the world of music and would like to be a DJ, but his lack of attractiveness and shy nature prevent him from even trying; the boy consoles himself by mixing compilations on audiocassette for friends and customers, using the tape recorders in the electrical appliance store where he works.

When the store closes, Enrico decides to turn making compilations into a real job: first he opens a little store, called "Mixed by Erry", where he creates personalized music cassettes for the people in the neighborhood; later, together with Peppe, he decides to ask a local boss for a loan to buy high-tech audio-recorders that allow him to copy a lot of original cassettes in a short time. Thanks to the connections made in prison by his other brother Angelo, the brothers decide to expand the business: at first they have to deal with Moroccan gangsters who would like to impede their activity, but soon, thanks in part to Angelo's knowledge of the criminal underworld, they gain the upper hand. Before long, the Frattasios set up numerous laboratories in which they mix thousands of audiocassettes, which they then sell throughout Italy by exploiting black market.

Business is booming and the Frattasios become very rich and famous, to the point that their pirate brand name "Mixed By Erry" is pirated itself. This attracts the attentions of a Camorra boss, who would like to overtake their business, but who gets killed in one of the mob wars of 1980s. Meanwhile, Captain Ricciardi of the Guardia di Finanza discovers the dealings of the three brothers, and decides to break up their business. The Frattasios react by formalizing their company and, at the same time, creating satellite companies through which they launder the proceeds of their business. Moreover, they strike a deal with Arturo Barambani, managing director of an audio media company, for the exclusive supply of blank cassette tapes for their business, once the director notes the impressive figures of the three brothers' orders. The business deal develops into a singular friendship between the four.

Ricciardi's investigations are at a standstill, and Enrico sidetracks the investigation by having himself followed to the 1991 Sanremo Music Festival, where Ricciardi hopes to locate the mole that allows the firm to put out the Festival compilations long before they are released in stores. "Mixed By Erry" meanwhile becomes the first record label in Italy by revenue: the reaction of the record companies, which would like to eliminate the fraudulent competition, alarms Barambani, who asks the three brothers to close their business and live off their income. Faced with their refusal, Barambani betrays the Frattasios and helps Ricciardi set up the indictment that will lead to their arrest and the confiscation of their assets.

The Frattasios then end up in prison, but Enrico receives a tip: their money has been buried in a secret place, which on leaving prison they will be able to take over in order to seize it again. In prison, however, Enrico receives the news that soon the lira will be replaced by the euro, which will make their plan more difficult. Upon their release from prison five years later, the three brothers will find more menial jobs and close the "Mixed by Erry" company.

In the scene after the credits, it is revealed that, in fact, there is no "Sanremo mole": it was their parents who, having tape recorders in the house, recorded the festivals broadcast on live TV, and then transferred them to audio media.

== Cast ==
- Luigi D'Oriano as Enrico "Erry" Frattasio
- Giuseppe Arena as Peppe Frattasio
- Emanuele Palumbo as Angelo Frattasio
- Francesco Di Leva as Captain Fortunato Ricciardi
- Cristiana Dell'Anna as Marisa Frattasio
- Adriano Pantaleo as Pasquale Frattasio
- Chiara Celotto as Francesca
- Greta Esposito as Teresa
- Fabrizio Gifuni as Arturo Maria Barambani
- Renato De Rienzo as General Maurizio Ambrosetti

== Reception ==
=== Critical response ===
On Rotten Tomatoes, the film has an approval rating of 100% based on 5 reviews, and an average rating of 7.5/10.

=== Awards ===
The film won the Nastro d'Argento for best comedy film, as well as the awards for best production, best casting, and best production design.
