= Song'e Napule =

- Directed by: Manetti Bros.
- Screenplay by: Michelangelo La Neve; Giampaolo Morelli; Manetti Bros.
- Starring: Alessandro Roja; Giampaolo Morelli; Serena Rossi; Paolo Sassanelli; Peppe Servillo; Carlo Buccirosso
- Cinematography: Francesca Amitrano
- Music by: Pivio and Aldo De Scalzi
- Release date: November 10, 2013 (Rome International Film Festival)
- Running time: 114 minutes
- Language: Italian

Song'e Napule is a 2013 Italian heist comedy film written and directed by Manetti Bros. and starring Alessandro Roja and Giampaolo Morelli. It premiered at the 2013 Rome Film Festival.

For their performances, Carlo Buccirosso and Paolo Sassanelli won the Nastro d'Argento for best supporting actors. The film also won both Nastro d'Argento and David di Donatello Awards for best score (by Pivio and Aldo De Scalzi) and for best original song (for two different songs, respectively "'A verità" by Alessandro Nelson Garofalo, Rosario Castagnola, Francesco Liccardo and Sarah Tartuffo and "Song'e Napule" by C. Di Risio, F. D’Ancona and Giampaolo Morelli), as well as the Nastro d'Argento for best comedy film.

== Cast ==
- Alessandro Roja as Paco Stillo/Pino Dinamite
- Giampaolo Morelli as Lollo Love
- Serena Rossi as Marianna
- Paolo Sassanelli as Police Commissioner Cammarota
- Peppe Servillo as Ciro Serracane
- Ciro Petrone as Pastetta
- Ivan Granatino as Nello
- Carlo Buccirosso as Quaestor Vitali
- Franco Ricciardi as Boss Scornaienco
- Marco Mario de Notaris as Attilio

== See also ==
- List of Italian films of 2013
