= Distretto di Polizia =

Italian television series

- Genre: Police procedural; Action drama
- Created by: Pietro Valsecchi and Simone De Rita
- Starring: Isabella Ferrari; Ricky Memphis; Giorgio Tirabassi; Lorenzo Flaherty; Simone Corrente; Serena Bonanno; Roberto Nobile; Gianni Ferreri; Daniela Morozzi; Marco Marzocca; Cristina Moglia; Claudia Pandolfi; Giorgio Pasotti; Francesco Vitiello; Giulia Bevilacqua; Giampaolo Morelli; Francesca Inaudi; Enrico Silvestrin; Massimo Dapporto; Max Giusti; Anna Foglietta; Stefano Pesce; Flavio Parenti; Lucilla Agosti; Dino Abbrescia; Maria Sole Mansutti; Gianluca Bazzoli; Andrea Renzi; Paolo Calabresi; Maria Amelia Monti
- Country of origin: Italy
- No. of seasons: 11
- No. of episodes: 282

Production
- Running time: 45 - 50 min (episode)

Original release
- Release: 26 September 2000 – 15 January 2012

Distretto di Polizia is an Italian police procedural television series, aired on Canale 5 from 26 January 2000, until 15 January 2012, lasting eleven seasons. The show revolves around the lives of the employees of a police station in the Tuscolano neighborhood of Rome.

== Cast ==
- Isabella Ferrari as Giovanna Scalise
- Giorgio Tirabassi as Roberto Ardenzi
- Ricky Memphis as Mauro Belli
- Lorenzo Flaherty: Walter Manrico
- Simone Corrente as Luca Benvenuto
- Serena Bonanno as Nina Moretti
- Roberto Nobile as Antonio Parmesan
- Marco Marzocca as Ugo Lombardi
- Carlotta Natoli as Angela Rivalta
- Claudia Pandolfi as Giulia Corsi
- Giorgio Pasotti as Paolo Libero
- Giampaolo Morelli: Davide Rea
- Giulia Bevilacqua as Anna Gori
- Francesca Inaudi as Irene Valli
- Enrico Silvestrin as Alessandro Berti
- Massimo Dapporto as Marcello Fontana
- Max Giusti as Raffaele Marchetti
- Anna Foglietta: Elena Argenti
- Stefano Pesce: Lorenzo Monti
- Flavio Parenti as Gabriele Mancini
- Dino Abbrescia: Pietro Esposito
- Lucilla Agosti as Barbara Rostagno
- Andrea Renzi: Leonardo Brandi

== Episodes ==
Series	Episodes	Originally released	
Series	Episodes	First released	Last released
1	24	26 September 2000	5 December 2000
2	24	25 September 2001	9 December 2001
3	26	17 September 2002	2 December 2002
4	26	21 September 2003	2 December 2003
5	26	27 September 2005	22 November 2005
6	26	12 September 2006	21 November 2006
7	26	6 September 2007	19 November 2007
8	26	4 September 2008	20 November 2008
9	26	11 September 2009	29 November 2009
10	26	5 September 2010	14 November 2010
11	26	9 October 2011	15 January 2012

=== Season 1 (2000) ===
No.	Italian title English title	Directed by	Original release date
1	"The Ambush" (Italian: L'agguato)	Alberto Ferrari	26 September 2000
2	"Blackmail" (Italian: Il ricatto)	Alberto Ferrari	26 September 2000

=== Season 2 (2001) ===
No.	Title	Directed by	Original release date
1	"Revenge" (Italian: La vendetta)	Alberto Ferrari	25 September 2001
2	"The Assignment" (Italian: L'incarico)	Alberto Ferrari	25 September 2001

=== Season 3 (2002) ===
No.	Title	Directed by	Original release date
1	"Nick of Time" (Italian: Minuti contati)	Alberto Ferrari	17 September 2002
2	"Death Live" (Italian: Morte in diretta)	Alberto Ferrari	17 September 2002

=== Season 4 (2003) ===
No.	Title	Directed by	Original release date
1	"The Hostage" (Italian: L'ostaggio)	Alberto Ferrari	21 September 2003
2	"No Way To Escape" (Italian: Senza via di fuga)	Alberto Ferrari	21 September 2003

=== Season 5 (2005) ===
No.	Title	Directed by	Original release date
1	"The Guardian Angel" (Italian: L'angelo custode)	Alberto Ferrari	27 September 2005
2	"Betrayal" (Italian: Tradimenti)	Alberto Ferrari	27 September 2005

=== Season 6 (2006) ===
No.	Title	Directed by	Original release date
1	"A Perfect Day (Part One)" (Italian: Un giorno perfetto (prima parte))	Alberto Ferrari	12 September 2006
2	"A Perfect Day (Part Two)" (Italian: Un giorno perfetto (seconda parte))	Alberto Ferrari	12 September 2006

=== Season 7 (2007) ===
No.	Title	Directed by	Original release date
1	"The Innocent" (Italian: L'innocente)	Alberto Ferrari	6 September 2007
2	"The Herd" (Italian: Il branco)	Alberto Ferrari	6 September 2007

=== Season 8 (2008) ===
No.	Title	Directed by	Original release date
1	"The Time That Remains" (Italian: Il tempo che ci resta)	Alberto Ferrari	4 September 2008
2	"Life Lessons" (Italian: Lezioni di vita)	Alberto Ferrari	4 September 2008

=== Season 9 (2009) ===
No.	Title	Directed by	Original release date
1	"Prey (Part One)" (Italian: Prede (prima parte))	Alberto Ferrari	11 September 2009
2	"Prey (Part Two)" (Italian: Prede (seconda parte))	Alberto Ferrari	11 September 2009

=== Season 10 (2010) ===
No.	Title	Directed by	Original release date
1	"Past, Present" (Italian: Passato, presente)	Alberto Ferrari	5 September 2010
2	"Indictment" (Italian: Atto di accusa)	Alberto Ferrari	5 September 2010
3	"Memories and Lies" (Italian: Ricordi e bugie)	Alberto Ferrari	6 September 2010
4	"A Better Future" (Italian: Un futuro migliore)	Alberto Ferrari	6 September 2010
5	"Masks and Faces" (Italian: Maschere e volti)	Alberto Ferrari	12 September 2010
6	"It Was My Mother" (Italian: Era mia madre)	Alberto Ferrari	12 September 2010
7	"Ghosts" (Italian: Fantasmi)	Alberto Ferrari	19 September 2010
8	"Test of Love" (Italian: Prova d'amore)	Alberto Ferrari	19 September 2010
9	"Tsunami" (Italian: Tsunami)	Alberto Ferrari	26 September 2010
10	"Causes and Affected" (Italian: Cause e affetti)	Alberto Ferrari	26 September 2010
11	"Far From Here" (Italian: Lontano da qui)	Alberto Ferrari	27 September 2010
12	"Senses of Guilt" (Italian: Sensi di colpa)	Alberto Ferrari	27 September 2010
13	"The Third Eye" (Italian: Il terzo occhio)	Alberto Ferrari	3 October 2010
14	"Hanging By a Thread" (Italian: Appesi a un filo)	Alberto Ferrari	3 October 2010
15	"At The Last Second" (Italian: All'ultimo secondo)	Alberto Ferrari	10 October 2010
16	"The Tana of the Wolf" (Italian: La tana del lupo)	Alberto Ferrari	10 October 2010
17	"A Dangerous Suspect" (Italian: Un sospetto pericoloso)	Alberto Ferrari	17 October 2010
18	"Sad Laughter" (Italian: Una triste risata)	Alberto Ferrari	17 October 2010
19	"Unusual Suspects" (Italian: Insoliti sospetti)	Alberto Ferrari	24 October 2010
20	"Walking Dead" (Italian: Morto che cammina)	Alberto Ferrari	24 October 2010
21	"Life in the Game" (Italian: La vita in gioco)	Alberto Ferrari	31 October 2010
22	"Another Opportunity" (Italian: Un'altra opportunità)	Alberto Ferrari	31 October 2010
23	"Lives in Secrets" (Italian: Vite in segreto)	Alberto Ferrari	7 November 2010
24	"The Weaker Sex" (Italian: Il sesso debole)	Alberto Ferrari	7 November 2010
25	"Before It Happens" (Italian: Prima che accada)	Alberto Ferrari	14 November 2010
26	"Games of Baby Girl" (Italian: Giochi di bimba)	Alberto Ferrari	14 November 2010

=== Season 11 (2011-2012) ===
No.	Title	Directed by	Original release date
1	"Crossfire Destinies (Part One)" (Italian: Destini incrociati (prima parte))	Alberto Ferrari	9 October 2011
2	"Crossfire Destinies (Part Two)" (Italian: Destini incrociati (seconda parte))	Alberto Ferrari	9 October 2011
3	"Divided in Two (Part One)" (Italian: Divisi in due (prima parte))	Alberto Ferrari	16 October 2011
4	"Divided in Two (Part Two)" (Italian: Divisi in due (seconda parte))	Alberto Ferrari	16 October 2011
5	"Giarabub" (Italian: Giarabub)	Alberto Ferrari	23 October 2011
6	"Pirates" (Italian: Pirati)	Alberto Ferrari	23 October 2011
7	"The Factory of the Clones" (Italian: La fabbrica dei cloni)	Alberto Ferrari	30 October 2011
8	"The Force of a Love" (Italian: La forza di un amore)	Alberto Ferrari	30 October 2011
9	"Love in Sale" (Italian: Amore in vendita)	Alberto Ferrari	6 November 2011
10	"Jackals" (Italian: Sciacalli)	Alberto Ferrari	6 November 2011
11	"Illegals Game" (Italian: Giochi clandestini)	Alberto Ferrari	8 November 2011
12	"The Trap" (Italian: La trappola)	Alberto Ferrari	8 November 2011
13	"Lost" (Italian: Perduta)	Alberto Ferrari	13 November 2011
14	"Fatal Talent" (Italian: Un talento fatale)	Alberto Ferrari	13 November 2011
15	"The Blood of Luca" (Italian: Il sangue di Luca)	Alberto Ferrari	20 November 2011
16	"The Bad Road" (Italian: La cattiva strada)	Alberto Ferrari	20 November 2011
17	"The Sample" (Italian: Il campione)	Alberto Ferrari	27 November 2011
18	"The Remember of Chiara" (Italian: Il ricordo di Chiara)	Alberto Ferrari	4 December 2011
19	"Choices" (Italian: Scelte)	Alberto Ferrari	11 December 2011
20	"A Single Error" (Italian: Un unico errore)	Alberto Ferrari	18 December 2011
21	"Unpunished" (Italian: Impunibile)	Alberto Ferrari	1 January 2012
22	"Made in Home" (Italian: Fatto in casa)	Alberto Ferrari	1 January 2012
23	"Prejudices and Good People" (Italian: Pregiudizi e brave persone)	Alberto Ferrari	8 January 2012
24	"The Wrong Son" (Italian: Il figlio sbagliato)	Alberto Ferrari	8 January 2012
25	"The Grain and the Pula (Part One)" (Italian: Il grano e la pula (prima parte))	Alberto Ferrari	15 January 2012
26	"Il grano e la pula (seconda parte)" "The Grain and the Pula (Part Two)"	Alberto Ferrari	15 January 2012

== See also ==
- List of Italian television series
