= Stefano Fresi =

Italian actor and composer (born 1974)

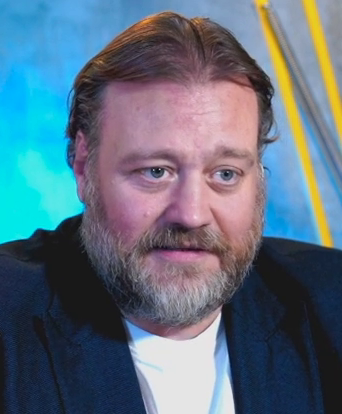
- Born: 16 July 1974 (age 52); Rome, Italy
- Occupations: Actor; musician
- Years active: 2003–present

Stefano Fresi (born 16 July 1974) is an Italian actor and musician.

== Early life and career ==
Fresi was born on 16 July 1974. In 1997, he left his studies in literature to work in a factory and started theater training. In 2004, he joined the cast of the Italian television series Un medico in famiglia, as a relative of Torello (played by Francesco Salvi). In 2012 he starred in the serial killer thriller Canepazzo. In 2014, he played in the film I Can Quit Whenever I Want and received a nomination for the David di Donatello for best supporting actor.

== Filmography ==
=== Film ===
Year	Title	Role(s)	Notes
2005	Romanzo Criminale	Inspector Nicola Scialoja	
2008	Good Morning Heartache	Giorgio	
2008	Riflesso	Giobby	Short film
2009	L'amore è un giogo	Alessandro	
2011	Escort in Love	Clown	Cameo appearance
2012	Canepazzo	Rebel Henchman	Cameo appearance
2012	Viva l'Italia	Santini	
2013	Benur: Un gladiatore in affitto	Camomilla	
2014	The Move of the Penguin	Omone	
2014	I Can Quit Whenever I Want	Alberto Petrelli	
2014	Ogni maledetto Natale	Rino / Policeman	
2015	The Legendary Giulia and Other Miracles	Claudio Felici	
2015	The Last Will Be the Last	Bruno Sebastiani	
2015	La prima volta (di mia figlia)	Giovanni	
2015	Poli opposti	Marco	
2015	Finchè c'è vita c'è speranza	Alfio	Short film
2016	Forever Young	Lorenzo	
2016	L'età d'oro	Alberto	
2016	Al posto tuo	Rocco Fontana	
2017	I Can Quit Whenever I Want: Masterclass	Alberto Petrelli	
2017	Pure Hearts	Don Luca	
2017	Nine and a Half Moons	Dr. Nicola Pentino	
2017	La casa di famiglia	Oreste Lombardi	
2017	I Can Quit Whenever I Want: Ad Honorem	Alberto Petrelli	
2018	Sconnessi	Palmiro Catenacci	
2018	The Man Who Bought the Moon	Pino	
2018	Finchè giudice non ci separi	Rinaldi	
2018	The Legend of the Christmas Witch	Giovanni Rovasio / Mr. Johnny	
2019	Detective per caso	Baldelli	
2019	C'è tempo	Stefano	
2019	Il grande passo	Mario Cavalieri	
2019	Roma non è un gioco	Paolo	Short film
2019	The Lion King	Pumbaa (voice)	Italian voice-over
2019	Don't Stop Me Now	Roberto Desideri	
2019	Arctic Dogs	P.B. (voice)	Italian voice-over
2020	Figli	Nicola's Friend	
2020	The Kingdom	Giacomo	
2020	The One and Only Ivan	Bob (voice)	Italian voice-over
2021	Breaking Up in Rome	Umberto	
2022	Ritorno al presente	Giuseppe	
2022	La donna per me	Lorenzo	
2022	Chip 'n Dale: Rescue Rangers	Pumbaa (voice)	Italian voice-over
2022	Everyone on Board	Bruno	
2022	The Land of Dreams	Carl	
2022	The Desired War	Maurizio	
2023	Quando	Stefano	
2023	The Best Days	Paolo Sgarbossa	
2024	Mufasa: The Lion King	Pumbaa (voice)	Italian voice-over
2026	Un tranquillo funerale di famiglia	Osvaldo	

=== Television ===
Year	Title	Role(s)	Notes
2004–2007	Un medico in famiglia	Rosalbo	Recurring role (season 4-5)
2007	RIS Delitti Imperfetti	Alberto Beltrami	Episode: "Il vicino di casa"
2009	Intelligence – Servizi & segreti	Sergio Vega	Main role
2017	In arte Nino	Tino Buazzelli	Television movie
2018–present	Murders at Barlume	Giuseppe Battaglia	Main role (season 5-present)
2019	The Name of the Rose	Salvatore	Main role
2023	Vivere non è un gioco da ragazzi	Marco Molinari	Lead role
2024	Kostas	Kostas Charitos	Lead role
