= Marco Marzocca =

Italian actor and comedian

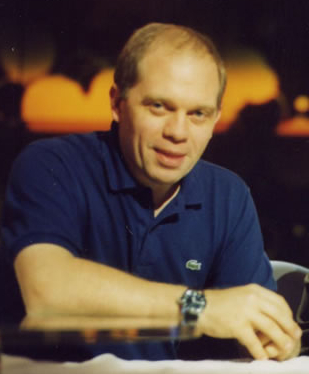
- Born: 14 September 1962 (age 62); Rome, Italy
- Occupation(s): Actor; Comedian
- Years active: 1994-present
- Height: 1.70 m (5 ft 7 in)

Marco Marzocca (born 14 September 1962) is an Italian actor and comedian.

== Life and career ==
Born in Rome, Marzocca worked as a pharmacist until 1994, when he began working as a sidekick of the comedian Corrado Guzzanti in a series of stage and television shows. During the TV show Il caso Scrafoglia he created Ariel, a comic caricature of a bizarre Filipino domestic worker, a character he later reprised in a series of television variety shows including Rai 2's Bulldozer and Canale 5's Zelig. He is also well known for the role of the policeman Ugo Lombardi in the crime TV-series Distretto di Polizia, of which he was in the main cast for all the 11 seasons.
