= I Can Quit Whenever I Want: Masterclass =

2017 Italian crime comedy film

- Film poster
- Italian: Smetto quando voglio - Masterclass
- Directed by: Sydney Sibilia
- Written by: Sydney Sibilia; Francesca Manieri; Luigi Di Capua
- Produced by: Domenico Procacci; Matteo Rovere
- Starring: Edoardo Leo; Valerio Aprea; Paolo Calabresi; Libero De Rienzo; Stefano Fresi; Lorenzo Lavia; Pietro Sermonti; Marco Bonini; Rosario Lisma; Giampaolo Morelli; Greta Scarano; Valeria Solarino
- Cinematography: Vladan Radovic
- Edited by: Gianni Vezzosi
- Music by: Michele Braga
- Production companies: Fandango; Groenlandia; Rai Cinema
- Distributed by: 01 Distribution
- Release date: 2 February 2017 (Italy)
- Running time: 118 minutes
- Country: Italy
- Language: Italian
- Box office: $3,457,091

I Can Quit Whenever I Want: Masterclass (Italian: Smetto quando voglio - Masterclass) is a 2017 Italian crime comedy film directed by Sydney Sibilia.

It is the sequel to 2014 I Can Quit Whenever I Want and the second installment in the I Can Quit trilogy. A sequel entitled I Can Quit Whenever I Want: Ad Honorem was released in November 2017.

== Cast ==
- Edoardo Leo as Pietro Zinni
- Valerio Aprea as Mattia Argeri
- Paolo Calabresi as Arturo Frantini
- Libero De Rienzo as Bartolomeo Bonelli
- Stefano Fresi as Alberto Petrelli
- Lorenzo Lavia as Giorgio Sironi
- Pietro Sermonti as Andrea De Sanctis
- Marco Bonini as Giulio Bolle
- Rosario Lisma as Vittorio
- Giampaolo Morelli as Lucio Napoli
- Greta Scarano as Paola Coletti
- Valeria Solarino as Giulia
- Luigi Lo Cascio as Walter Mercurio
- Francesco Acquaroli as Commissioner Galatro
- Giusy Buscemi as Alice Gentili
- Raniero Monaco Di Lapio as Fabio Scotti
- Giulio Maroncelli as Mercurio's henchman
- Marco Pancrazi as Mercurio's henchman
- Manfredi Bruno as Father Manfredi
- Enzo Provenzano as the car wrecker
- Davide Gagliardi as Danilo Autero
- Luca Restagno as Saverio
- Rocco Loschiavo as Cardinal De Figueroa
- Dzhamila Ibragimova as Femen girl
- Fabio Rizzuto as the docker
- Daniele Ferretti as the old man
