= Matteo Rovere =

Italian director, screenwriter and producer (born 1982)

- Born: 22 January 1982 (age 44); Rome, Italy
- Occupations: Director; producer; writer
- Years active: 2010-present

Matteo Rovere (born 22 January 1982) is an Italian filmmaker. He is the youngest Italian filmmaker to have won the Nastro d'Argento for Best Producer, with I Can Quit Whenever I Want.

== Life and career ==
Born in Rome in 1982, Matteo Rovere started directing short films at very young age, and his shorts were screened at over 140 festivals.

In 2007, his short film Homo Homini Lupus won the Nastro d'Argento for best short film.

In 2009 he made his feature film debut with the coming of age drama A Game for Girls, which was entered into the competition at the 2008 Rome International Film Festival. He debuts as film producer with the documentary Pietro Germi – Il bravo, il bello, il cattivo, presented at the 62° Cannes Film Festival.

In 2012 his second feature film as director Drifters debuts on theaters, the film is adapter from Sandro Veronesi novel with the same name and interpreted by Andrea Bosca, Miriam Giovanelli, Claudio Santamaria, Michele Riondino and Massimo Popolizio. The film was presented in London as global preview the year before in occasion of the British Film Institute Festival.

In 2014 he's film producer of Sydney Sibilia's I Can Quit Whenever I Want, film that makes more than 5 million euros at the box office, achieving 12 nominations for the David di Donatello and 5 nominations for Nastro d'argento. Matteo Rovere won the Nastro d'Argento for Best Producer.

In 2016 he wrote, directed and produced his third film Italian Race, starring Stefano Accorsi and Matilda De Angelis. It became one of the most successful box office hits in Italy that year, well received both by critics and audience. The film won best cinematography, best editing, best sound editing, best make-up artist and best musical effects at the 2017 David di Donatello's awards and one Nastro d'argento for best film editing. That year he also produced two sequels of I Can Quit Whenever I Want, entitled I Can Quit Whenever I Want: Masterclass and I Can Quit Whenever I Want: Ad Honorem.

In 2019 he directed the historical drama The First King: Birth of an Empire (Il primo re), starring Alessandro Borghi and Alessio Lapice. The film was nominated for eight Nastro d'argento awards such as Best Film and Best Director. The same year he was appointed as showrunner, producer and director of Romulus, a Sky Original TV series.

In 2020 he also produced, together with Ascent Film, the biopic The Bad Poet, about the last days of Gabriele D'Annunzio, and the claustrophobic thriller Shadows, with Mia Threapleton and Lola Petticrew.

In 2020, he produced: Dogworld, Alessandro Celli’s dystopian debut feature, starring Alessandro Borghi; Carosone, a biopic about musician Renato Carosone, directed by Lucio Pellegrini; With or Without You, Stefano Sardo’s directorial debut, produced with Ascent Film; Marilyn's Eyes, Simone Godano’s third feature film; September, Giulia Louise Steigerwalt’s directorial debut; and Blackout Love, Francesca Marino’s directorial debut.

In 2021, he produced Delta, Michele Vannucci’s second feature film, starring Alessandro Borghi and Luigi Lo Cascio; The Travelers, the new film by Ludovico Di Martino; and, together with Ascent Film, Hypersleep, Alberto Mascia’s directorial debut, starring Stefano Accorsi.

In 2022, he co-directed, together with Francesca Mazzoleni and Francesco Carrozzini, Supersex, a Netflix Original series loosely inspired by the life of Rocco Siffredi, and produced The Good Season, a documentary film about the 1990s Sampdoria football team.

In 2023, the Netflix series The Law According to Lidia Poët, which he directed and produced, was released. He also produced Like Sheep Among Wolves, Lyda Patitucci’s directorial debut, and Mixed by Erry, the latest film by Sydney Sibilia.

In 2024, he produced for cinema with Groenlandia the films Family Matter by Simone Godano; A Dark Story by Leonardo D’Agostini; El paraíso by Enrico Maria Artale and The Flood – The Last Days of Marie Antoinette by Gianluca Jodice.

In October 2024, the second season of Netflix’s The Law According to Lidia Poët — for which he directed episode 2x01 — was released, alongside Disney+’s This Is Not Hollywood by Pippo Mezzapesa, and Sky’s Accidentally Famous, a series created by Sydney Sibilia. All three series reached the top positions in the streaming rankings.

Also in 2025, he produced Siblings, Greta Scarano’s directorial debut, inspired by the true story of the Tercon brothers; and the event documentary Pino by Francesco Lettieri, dedicated to the life of Neapolitan singer-songwriter Pino Daniele.

In 2026, he produces and directs three episodes of the series Motorvalley, starring Giulia Michelini and Luca Argentero. He also produces the third and final season of the successful series The Law According to Lidia Poët.

== Filmography ==
=== Director and screenwriter ===
==== Film ====
- Gitanes – documentary (2004)
- A Game for Girls (2008)
- Drifters (2011)
- Italian Race (2016)
- The First King: Birth of an Empire (2019)

==== TV series ====
- Romulus - ep 1x01-1x02-2x01 (2020–2022)
- The Law According to Lidia Pöet ep 1x01-1x02-2x01 (2023–2024)
- Supersex ep 1x01-1x04-1x06 (2024)
- Motorvalley ep 1x01-1x02-1x05 (2026)

=== Producer ===
- Homo homini lupus – short film (2006)
- Pietro Germi: Il bravo, il bello, il cattivo, regia di Claudio Bondì – documentary (2009)
- Ritratto di mio padre, directed by Maria Sole Tognazzi – documentary (2010)
- Oggi gira così – short film (2010)
- Altra musica – short film (2012)
- The Pills 1/2 – webseries (2013)
- The Pills – webseries (2013–2014)
- I Can Quit Whenever I Want, directed by Sydney Sibilia (2014)
- The Ice Forest, directed by Claudio Noce (2014)
- Zio Gianni - TV series (2014–2015)
- La prima volta (di mia figlia), directed by Riccardo Rossi (2015)
- The Pills – Sempre meglio che lavorare, directed by Luca Vecchi (2016) – executive producer
- I Can Quit Whenever I Want: Masterclass, directed by Sydney Sibilia (2017)
- Moglie e marito, directed by Simone Godano (2017)
- The Italian Jobs: Paramount Pictures e l'Italia, directed by Marco Spagnoli – documentary (2017)
- I Can Quit Whenever I Want: Ad Honorem, directed by Sydney Sibilia (2017)
- Sembra mio figlio, directed by Costanza Quatriglio (2018)
- Ovunque proteggimi, directed by Bonifacio Angius (2018)
- The First King: Birth of an Empire (2019), directed by Matteo Rovere (2019)
- An Almost Ordinary Summer, directed by Simone Godano (2019)
- The Champion, directed by Leonardo D'Agostini (2019)
- The Bad Poet by Gianluca Jodice(2020)
- With or Without You by Stefano Sardo (2021)
- Shadows by Carlo Lavagna (2020)
- Rose Island by Sydney Sibilia (2020)
- Marilyn's Eyes by Simone Godano (2022)
- September by Giulia Louise Steigerwalt (2022)
- Romulus TV series - 2 seasons (2020–2022)
- Mixed by Erry by Sydney Sibilia (2023)
- Like Sheep Among Wolves by Lida Patitucci (2023)
- El paraìso by Enrico Maria Artale (2023)
- Family Matters by Simone Godano (2024)
- A Dark Story by Leonardo D'Agostini (2024)
- The Flood by Gianluca Jodice (2024)
- No Activity: Italy TV series (2024)
- Supersex TV series (2024)
- This Is Not Hollywood Tv Series (2024)
- Diva Futura by Giulia Louse Steigerwalt (2025)
- Performance: A Dangerous Game by Lucio Pellegrini (2025)
- Siblings by Greta Scarano (2025)
- Motorvalley TV series (2026)
- Accidentally Famous TV series - 2 seasons (2024–2026)
- Real Men TV series - 2 seasons (2023–2026)
- The Law According to Lidia Poët TV series - 3 seasons (2023–2026)

== Nominations and awards ==
- David di Donatello
  - 2014 - Nomination for Best Producer - I Can Quit Whenever I Want
  - 2017 - Nomination for Best Film - Italian Race
  - 2017 - Nomination for Best Director - Italian Race
  - 2017 - Nomination for Best Original Screenplay - Italian Race
  - 2018 - Nomination for Best Producer - I Can Quit Whenever I Want - Masterclass and I Can Quit Whenever I Want - Ad honorem
  - 2020 - Nomination for Best Film - The First King: Birth of an Empire
  - 2020 - Nomination for Best Director - The First King: Birth of an Empire
  - 2020 - Nomination for Best Original Screenplay - The First King: Birth of an Empire
  - 2020 - Award for Best Producer - The First King: Birth of an Empire
  - 2021 - Nomination for Best Producer - Rose Island
- Nastro d'argento
  - 2007 - Award for Best Short Film - Homo homini lupus
  - 2014 - Award for Best Producer - I Can Quit Whenever I Want
  - 2019 - Nomination for Best Director - The First King: Birth of an Empire
  - 2019 - Nomination for Best Film - The First King: Birth of an Empire
  - 2019 - Award for Best Producer - The First King: Birth of an Empire
  - 2019 - Award for Best Producer - Il Campione
- Globo d'oro
  - 2017 - Nomination for Best Screenplay - Italian Race
