= Italian Race =

- Directed by: Matteo Rovere
- Written by: Filippo Gravino; Francesca Manieri; Matteo Rovere
- Produced by: Domenico Procacci; Fandango; Rai Cinema
- Starring: Stefano Accorsi; Matilda De Angelis
- Cinematography: Michele D'Attanasio
- Edited by: Gianni Vezzosi
- Music by: Andrea Farri
- Release date: 7 April 2016
- Running time: 118 minutes
- Box office: $2,412,312

Italian Race (Italian: Veloce come il vento) is a 2016 Italian sports-drama film written and directed by Matteo Rovere. It is loosely based on the true story of rally driver Carlo Capone.

== Plot ==
The passion for engines has always flowed in Giulia De Martino's veins. She comes from a family that has been producing motor racing champions for generations. She too is a driver, an exceptional talent who, at the age of seventeen, took part in the GT Championship, under the guidance of her father Mario.

But one day everything changes and Giulia finds herself having to face the track and life alone.

Complicating the situation is the unexpected return of her brother Loris, a former driver by now totally unreliable, but with an extraordinary sixth sense for driving. They will be forced to work together, in a succession of adrenaline and emotions that will make them discover how difficult and important it is to try to be a family.

== Cast ==
- Stefano Accorsi as Loris De Martino
- Matilda De Angelis as Giulia De Martino
- Paolo Graziosi as Tonino
- Roberta Mattei as Annarella
- Lorenzo Gioielli as Ettore Minotti
- Giulio Pugnaghi as Nico De Martino
- Andrea Kimi Antonelli as Matteo

== Reception ==
Italian Race grossed $2,412,312 at the box office.

== See also ==
- List of Italian films of 2016
