= I Can Quit Whenever I Want =

- Italian theatrical release poster
- Italian: Smetto quando voglio
- Directed by: Sydney Sibilia
- Written by: Valerio Attanasio; Andrea Garello; Sydney Sibilia
- Produced by: Domenico Procacci; Matteo Rovere
- Starring: Edoardo Leo; Valeria Solarino; Valerio Aprea; Paolo Calabresi; Libero De Rienzo; Stefano Fresi; Lorenzo Lavia; Pietro Sermonti; Sergio Solli; Neri Marcorè
- Cinematography: Vladan Radovic
- Edited by: Gianni Vezzosi
- Music by: Andrea Farri
- Production companies: Fandango; Ascent Film; Rai Cinema
- Distributed by: 01 Distribution
- Release date: 6 February 2014
- Running time: 100 minutes
- Country: Italy
- Language: Italian
- Box office: $5.5 million

I Can Quit Whenever I Want (Italian: Smetto quando voglio) is a 2014 Italian crime comedy film directed by Sydney Sibilia. It was followed by two sequels, subtitled Masterclass and Ad Honorem, both released in 2017.

== Plot ==
Pietro Zinni, a brilliant neurobiologist, loses his job at the university because of the financial crisis. Without any reasonable chance to find another contract, Pietro assembles a team of ex-researchers like him—a chemist, a cultural anthropologist, an economist, an archaeologist, and two Latin scholars—to produce a little-known smart drug that is not yet illegal under Italian law. The gang achieves immediate and unexpected success but is unprepared for the problematic lifestyle that comes with such sudden wealth.

== Cast ==
- Edoardo Leo as Pietro Zinni
- Valeria Solarino as Giulia
- Valerio Aprea as Mattia Argeri
- Paolo Calabresi as Arturo Frantini
- Libero De Rienzo as Bartolomeo Bonelli
- Stefano Fresi as Alberto Petrelli
- Lorenzo Lavia as Giorgio Sironi
- Pietro Sermonti as Andrea De Sanctis
- Sergio Solli as Professor Seta
- Neri Marcorè as Murena
- Francesco Acquaroli as Commissioner Galatro
- Majlinda Agaj as Angelica
- Guglielmo Poggi as Maurizio
- Caterina Shulha as Paprika
- Nadir Caselli as Ilaria
- Luca Vecchi as the junkie in rehab
- Matteo Corradini as the junkie in disco
- Davide Gagliardi as Danilo Autero
- Enzo Provenzano as the car wrecker

== Accolades ==
Year	Award/Festival	Category	Recipients	Result
2014	59th David di Donatello	Best Producer	Domenico Procacci, Matteo Rovere and Rai Cinema	Nominated
2014	59th David di Donatello	Best Film	Domenico Procacci, Matteo Rovere, Sydney Sibilia and Rai Cinema	Nominated
2014	59th David di Donatello	Best New Director	Sydney Sibilia	Nominated
2014	59th David di Donatello	Best Screenplay	Valerio Attanasio, Sydney Sibilia	Nominated
2014	59th David di Donatello	Best Actor	Edoardo Leo	Nominated
2014	59th David di Donatello	Best Supporting Actor	Valerio Aprea	Nominated
2014	59th David di Donatello	Best Supporting Actor	Stefano Fresi	Nominated
2014	59th David di Donatello	Best Supporting Actor	Libero di Rienzo	Nominated
2014	59th David di Donatello	Best Song	Smetto quando voglio	Nominated
2014	59th David di Donatello	Best Editing	Gianni Vezzosi	Nominated
2014	59th David di Donatello	Best Sound	Angelo Bonanni	Nominated
2014	59th David di Donatello	Best Visual Effects	Rodolfo Migliari, Chromatica	Nominated
2014	Ciak d'oro	Best Poster	I Can Quit Whenever I Want	Won
2014	Ciak d'oro	Revelation Of the Year	Sydney Sibilia	Won
2014	Ciak d'oro	Best Supporting Actor	Paolo Calabresi	Nominated
2014	Ciak d'oro	Best Screenplay	Valerio Attanasio, Sydney Sibilia	Nominated
2014	Ciak d'oro	Best Editing	Gianni Vezzosi	Nominated
2014	Ciak d'oro	Best Score	Andrea Farri	Nominated
2014	Ciak d'oro	Best Producer	Domenico Procacci, Matteo Rovere	Nominated
2014	69th Nastri d'Argento	Best Producer	Domenico Procacci, Matteo Rovere and Rai Cinema	Won
2014	69th Nastri d'Argento	Best Actor	Edoardo Leo	Nominated
2014	69th Nastri d'Argento	Best New Director	Sydney Sibilia	Nominated
2014	69th Nastri d'Argento	Best Comedy	Sydney Sibilia	Nominated
2014	69th Nastri d'Argento	Best Casting Director	Francesca Borromeo, Gabriella Giannattasio	Nominated
2014	54th Italian Golden Globes	Best Comedy	Sydney Sibilia	Won
2014	54th Italian Golden Globes	Best Film	Sydney Sibilia	Nominated
2014	Reykjavik International Film Festival	Best Film	Sydney Sibilia	Won
