= Sydney Sibilia =

Italian filmmaker (born 1981)

- Born: 19 November 1981 (age 44); Salerno, Campania, Italy
- Occupations: Director; producer; writer
- Years active: 2010-present
- Spouses: Greta Scarano

Sydney Sibilia (Italian pronunciation: [ˈsidni siˈbiːlja]; born 19 November 1981) is an Italian filmmaker. He is the recipient of various accolades, including two Nastri d'argento and two Globi d'oro.

He rose to prominence with his debut feature, I Can Quit Whenever I Want (2014), which achieved critical and commercial success, being nominated for three David di Donatello, two Ciak d'oro, two Globo d'oro, and leading to two sequels. After co-founding italian production company Groenlandia, Sibilia has continued to explore themes of ambition and rebellion in films such as the Netflix original Rose Island (2020), which earned him the Globo d'oro, and Mixed by Erry (2023), which has been nominated for the David di Donatello and the Globo d'oro, and won the Nastro d'argento. In addition to film, Sibilia has directed the Sky series Accidentally Famous (2024–26), which was well-received in Italy.

== Career ==
Sydney Sibilia, originally from Salerno, began his career directing short films, notably Oggi gira così (2010), written with Valerio Attanasio and produced by Ascent Film. The short won several awards, including the SIAE award for Best Screenplay.

After relocating to Rome in 2007, he directed commercials for major campaigns, including Wind and Fox Crime, while simultaneously developing his debut feature film, I Can Quit Whenever I Want (Smetto quando voglio). Released in February 2014, the film—produced by Fandango, Ascent Film, and Rai Cinema—was a critical and commercial success, earning twelve David di Donatello nominations and awards like the Nastro d'argento for Best Producer and the Ciak d'oro for Sibilia as Revelation of the Year.

The film’s success led to two sequels: I Can Quit Whenever I Want: Masterclass (2017) and I Can Quit Whenever I Want: Ad Honorem (2017), both produced by Groenlandia, the production company Sibilia co-founded with Matteo Rovere. These projects solidified Sibilia’s reputation as a filmmaker blending humor and social commentary.

In 2020, Sibilia directed Rose Island, a Netflix original film based on the true story of the Republic of Rose Island. The movie was acclaimed for its unique storytelling and themes of rebellion and freedom.

Sibilia’s subsequent project, Mixed by Erry, released in 2024, chronicles the rise and fall of Enrico Frattasio, a pivotal figure in the Italian music piracy scene of the 1990s. Produced by Groenlandia, the film reflects Sibilia's ongoing interest in stories of ambition and unconventional success.

== Personal life ==
Since 2019, Sydney Sibilia has been in a relationship with actress Greta Scarano. The couple married in 2021.

== Filmography ==
=== Film ===
Year	Title	Note
2005	Iris Blu	Short film
2010	Oggi gira così	Short film
2014	I Can Quit Whenever I Want	Debut feature
2017	I Can Quit Whenever I Want: Masterclass	
2017	I Can Quit Whenever I Want: Ad Honorem	
2017	Io sì, tu no	Short film
2020	Rose Island	
2023	Mixed by Erry	

=== Television ===
Year	Title	Note
2024–2026	Accidentally Famous	TV series

== Awards and nominations ==
=== Ciak d'oro ===
Year	Category	Nominated work	Result
2014	Revelation of the Year	I Can Quit Whenever I Want	Won
2014	Best Screenplay	I Can Quit Whenever I Want	Nominated

=== David di Donatello ===
Year	Category	Nominated work	Result
2014	Best Film	I Can Quit Whenever I Want	Nominated
2014	David di Donatello for Best New Director	I Can Quit Whenever I Want	Nominated
2024	Best Adapted Screenplay	Mixed by Erry	Nominated

=== Globo d'oro ===
Year	Category	Nominated work	Result
2014	Best Comedy	I Can Quit Whenever I Want	Won
2014	Best Film	I Can Quit Whenever I Want	Nominated
2021	Best Comedy	Rose Island	Won
2023	Best Comedy	Mixed by Erry	Won

=== Nastro d'argento ===
Year	Category	Nominated work	Result
2014	Best Comedy	I Can Quit Whenever I Want	Nominated
2014	Best New Director	I Can Quit Whenever I Want	Nominated
2021	Best Comedy	Rose Island	Won
2023	Best Comedy	Mixed by Erry	Won
