= List of Suburra: Blood on Rome episodes =

Suburra: Blood on Rome (Italian: Suburra - La serie) is an Italian crime drama television series set in Rome. It is based on the 2015 film Suburra, in turn inspired by the novel of the same name by Giancarlo De Cataldo and Carlo Bonini. The series was developed by Daniele Cesarano, Barbara Petronio, Ezio Abbate and Fabrizio Bettelli for Netflix, making it the first Italian-language original television series produced by the company. It is produced by Cattleya in association with Rai Fiction and Bartleby Film.

Suburra draws from the real life events of the Mafia Capitale investigation and focuses on power clashes and corruption among organized crime, politicians and churchmen. The series revolves around Aureliano Adami (Alessandro Borghi), an Ostia-based gang member, and his relations with Alberto "Spadino" Anacleti (Giacomo Ferrara), a Sinti gang member, and Gabriele "Lele" Marchilli (Eduardo Valdarnini), the only son of a policeman who becomes involved in crime. Samurai (Francesco Acquaroli), an antagonist to the Adamis, is the head of Roman organized crime and contact for the Sicilian Mafia in Rome; he approaches politician Amedeo Cinaglia (Filippo Nigro) to aid in his Ostia affairs. Sara Monaschi (Claudia Gerini) is a Vatican financial auditor for lands in Ostia.

During the course of the programme, 24 episodes of Suburra: Blood on Rome were released over three series, between 6 October 2017 and 30 October 2020.

== Series overview ==
Season	Episodes	Originally released
1	10	6 October 2017
2	8	22 February 2019
3	6	30 October 2020

== Episodes ==
=== Season 1 (2017) ===
No. overall	No. in season	Italian title English title	Directed by	Written by	Original release date
1	1	"21 giorni" "21 Days"	Michele Placido	Story by : Daniele Cesarano, Barbara Petronio, Ezio Abbate, Fabrizio Bettelli, Nicola Guaglianone; Teleplay by : Daniele Cesarano & Barbara Petronio	6 October 2017
On February 23, 2008, the Mayor of Rome resigns, and crime boss Samurai has 21 days to force the Municipal Building Commission led by Amedeo Cinaglia to allow building on a piece of beachfront land in Ostia. Interested in building a port with criminal business partners from the south of Italy, he must also persuade the Vatican and the Adami family to sell the property to him. Financial auditor Sara Monaschi tries to convince Monsignor Theodosiou, the head of the Vatican commission in charge of selling, to offer the property to her husband, in exchange for a sex party organized by Lele Marchilli, a young drug dealer who has just been asked to bring €20,000 to Samurai for having dealt in his territory. Aureliano Adami kills Sinti mobster Boris, annoyed at his father's decision to sell his land to Samurai and at the latter's request for peace between the Adamis and the Sinti Anacleti families. Spadino Anacleti, a closeted homosexual, is forced by his family to meet Angelica, his betrothed. Lele asks Aureliano to bring cocaine to Theodosiou's sex party, but he ends up calling Spadino as well, as Aureliano is disposing of Boris's corpse. The three young men eventually meet at the party, where they find Theodosiou and decide to blackmail him with a sex tape recorded that night.
2	2	"Patrizi e plebei" "Plebes and Patricians"	Michele Placido	Story by : Daniele Cesarano, Barbara Petronio, Ezio Abbate, Fabrizio Bettelli, Nicola Guaglianone; Teleplay by : Daniele Cesarano & Barbara Petronio	6 October 2017
Cinaglia, frustrated by a lackluster political career, and facing the risk of not having a role in the next administration, he meets Samurai and agrees to help him. Spadino goes to the monsignor in the hospital, blackmailing him with the video. He contacts Sara, asking for help, which in turn asks Lele for help. Aureliano has Lele take her to the house of Isabelle, the prostitute of the night before, to kill her. Sara meets with Spadino but does not give in to blackmail, paying him only €30,000. Lele goes to the Samurai with only part of the money he owes him, but he is ordered to bring the remaining money plus the money for the disturbance within the next day, or €30,000. Involuntarily informed by Sara about the position of the monsignor, Lele communicates it to Aureliano and Spadino, who kidnap Theodosiou. Boris's body is found, disfigured. Aureliano goes to Isabelle to spend the night with her.
3	3	"Cani arrabbiati" "Rabid Dogs"	Andrea Molaioli	Story by : Daniele Cesarano, Barbara Petronio, Ezio Abbate, Fabrizio Bettelli, Nicola Guaglianone; Teleplay by : Fabrizio Bettelli	6 October 2017
Sara asks Samurai for help in finding and freeing the Monsignor, who accepts in exchange for half of the Ostia land. He convinces Spadino to free him and then demands Sara for all of the land, not just half. Sara asks the Countess for help, who advises her to remove the monsignor from Rome, in the meantime she has sent Finucci a Guarantee notice, thus excluding it from the building commission. Cinaglia tries to retrace his steps with the Samurai, who instead forces him to look for a corrupt replacement for Finucci. Manfredi sends the men of the clan to kill Aureliano: he ends up under fire from Spadino but lets him escape.
4	4	"Buon appetito" "Enjoy Your Meal"	Andrea Molaioli	Story by : Daniele Cesarano, Barbara Petronio, Ezio Abbate, Fabrizio Bettelli, Nicola Guaglianone; Teleplay by : Barbara Petronio & Nicola Guaglianone	6 October 2017
Angelica no longer wants to marry Spadino because of how he treated her. Manfredi convinces Spadino to be forgiven: the two spend the day together and she changes her mind. Lele asks Aureliano for the money to pay off the debt with Samurai. He agrees to help him by robbing the monsignor's house. During the theft, they find documents concerning the Ostia land. Tullio Adami calls Samurai, impatient to get even with the Anacleti. Samurai, worried about the land deal, cancels Lele's debt and instructs him to kill Tullio. Cinaglia learns that Finucci's post will be taken by Taccon, another idealist who seems incorruptible. Frightened by what Taccon could find on the Ostia papers, Finucci asks about the details of the deal. Lele kills Tullio.
5	5	"La lupa" "She Wolf"	Andrea Molaioli	Story by : Daniele Cesarano, Barbara Petronio, Ezio Abbate, Fabrizio Bettelli, Nicola Guaglianone; Teleplay by : Ezio Abbate	6 October 2017
The next day, Aureliano retrieves his father's hidden money, eager to avenge him. Livia independently takes control of the family and, summoning her father's and Samurai's affiliated bosses, rejects any desire for revenge and claims to actively enter the Ostia affair. Taccon is incorruptible, but reveals to Cinaglia his interest in a project on the revaluation of the museums of Rome. Samurai forces Lele to spy on the Adami family. The Countess reveals to Sara that she wants revenge on Samurai because he has ruined her and her husband, who committed suicide. Spadino gets married and to hide from not having fulfilled his "conjugal duties", he stains the bed with his own blood. Lele's father discovers his son's second life, who in the meantime begins a secret affair with Sara. Aureliano meets with Lele and Spadino, proposing them to take over all the lands of the Ostia: they accept and unite in a clan.
6	6	"Ajo, oio e peperoncino" "Garlic, Oil, and Chili Pepper"	Andrea Molaioli	Story by : Daniele Cesarano, Barbara Petronio, Ezio Abbate, Fabrizio Bettelli, Nicola Guaglianone; Teleplay by : Daniele Cesarano & Nicola Guaglianone	6 October 2017
Lele brings Sara to Spadino and Aureliano, in exchange for their protection against the Samurai, she agrees to make them members of her husband's society. Cinaglia seeks the help of Forzini, a corrupt parliamentarian and new husband of his ex-wife. The man refuses, and Cinaglia turns to Samurai for evidence to blackmail him. While Sara and Lele go to draw up the papers to sell shares of the company to Lele, Spadino and Aureliano, Spadino and Aureliano go get to Monsignor Theodosiou. When they try to get the priest, he takes refuge at the top of the bell tower, asking to see Sara. But her intervention is no better, and the monsignor commits suicide by jumping.
7	7	"Ultimo cliente" "Last Customer"	Giuseppe Capotondi	Story by : Daniele Cesarano, Barbara Petronio, Ezio Abbate, Fabrizio Bettelli, Nicola Guaglianone; Teleplay by : Fabrizio Bettelli	6 October 2017
After yet another quarrel, Isabelle chases Aureliano from her apartment and returns to be a prostitute. The moment she is with a client, however, she decides to run away, angering her pimp, who beats her. Aureliano tells his sister that he does not want to cede the lands of Ostia. Samurai discovers that Sara is acting for her own interests and threatens her husband. Sara, with the help of the Countess, tries to bribe the coroner to alter Theodosiou's autopsy, hiding the cause of death as suicide. Samurai questions Lele about Aureliano, but Lele does not betray his friend. Cinaglia, having had evidence of Forzini's corruption, convinces him to have Taccon appointed as head of the museums in Rome. He accepts the appointment, promising to approve the land management plan for Ostia. Aureliano, returns to Isabelle and, finding her beaten, avenges her by pounding and killing her pimp. The two then go to live at his mother's house. Manfredi threatens Spadino, who is entrusted with a delivery in the new shop area. Spadino secretly refuses and his wife Angelica replaces him, but is wounded in a shooting between the gypsies and the Adamis. With the falsified report, Sara manages to convince the Vatican commission to cede the lands to her husband's company, definitively ruining Samurai's plans. The Countess meets Samurai, betraying Sara.
8	8	"Un altro" "A New Man"	Giuseppe Capotondi	Story by : Daniele Cesarano, Barbara Petronio, Ezio Abbate, Fabrizio Bettelli, Nicola Guaglianone; Teleplay by : Ezio Abbate	6 October 2017
The Sicilian mafia is restless and puts pressure on Samurai, who has a minor accident falling asleep on a motorcycle. Livia Adami and Manfredi Anacleti are at a summit guaranteed by Samurai, who invites the first to return the territories to the latter and to compensate them. Although they gain nothing, for the Anacletis, it is still a victory because for the first time they negotiated with the organized crime bosses. The Countess meets with Sara and requires her to give the land to Samurai, threatening to denounce her for the story of Theodosiou. She then reveals that she used Sara only to steal the land from Samurai in order to recover the empire he had stolen from her. Angelica discovers her husband's love for Aureliano when she sees him smelling his hat. She then blackmails Spadino, forcing him to get her pregnant, otherwise he will tell Manfredi everything. Samurai meets with Lele, telling him that he knows about his betrayal. He forces him to call a meeting with Aureliano and Spadino in which the two boys will be killed before signing the papers, otherwise he will reveal Tullio's killer. Not wanting to risk his life or the death of his friends, Lele calls a meeting at a different time and place, telling his father to meet with two drug dealers. Sara tries to hinder the projects of the Samurai: first she meets with Finucci, who reveals the involvement of the mafia in the Ostia affair, and then with Cinaglia, denouncing what she knows. Cinaglia reports everything to Samurai, who, suspecting Finucci, kills him by staging a suicide. Livia, having learned that Aureliano lives with a black prostitute, goes to Isabelle and tells her to get out of Aureliano's life. Aureliano and Spadino go to the meeting, convinced that they must sign the papers by paying the notaries with cocaine. Instead, the police arrive and chase them. Lele's father is killed by Aureliano.
9	9	"Il buio" "Pitch Black"	Giuseppe Capotondi	Story by : Daniele Cesarano, Barbara Petronio, Ezio Abbate, Fabrizio Bettelli, Nicola Guaglianone; Teleplay by : Barbara Petronio	6 October 2017
Samurai informs Livia of Aureliano's double game with Spadino, ordering her to solve the problems on the Ostia lands. She tries unsuccessfully to deal with her brother. Quirino, the Adami accountant and Livia's lover, meets Samurai and sets up a trap against Aureliano. Frightened by the death of Finucci, Sara signs the renunciation of the lands of Ostia, handing them over to Samurai. Lele is discovered by Spadino and Aureliano who follow him; meanwhile he tries to cope with his father's loss and, at the funeral home, he discovers that his father was engaged to a colleague for 10 years. Aureliano and Spadino ambush Lele, but he manages to escape. Later, at his police station, his father's lover, a policewoman named Mara, reveals some secrets to him, realizing that he had misjudged him. Without another place to go, Lele goes to sleep in the house where he usually meets with Sara, who comforts him. Samurai confides to Manfredi a plan to kill Aureliano. When Spadino returns home, Manfredi confronts him, but his brother rebels and runs away from his family. Exalted for having abandoned the family, Spadino meets Aureliano, and kisses him in the rush of happiness. He is shocked and wholly rejects it. Cinaglia, having Taccon in his hand, asks Samurai to climb higher, becoming the mafia man in the town hall. Quirino calls Aureliano and draws him into the trap of Samurai, where Manfredi and two affiliates await him, but he manages to save himself and gravely wounds the Gypsy chieftain. Livia discovers Quirino's responsibilities in ambush and executes him.
10	10	"Chiamalo dormire" "Call It Sleep"	Giuseppe Capotondi	Story by : Daniele Cesarano, Barbara Petronio, Ezio Abbate, Fabrizio Bettelli, Nicola Guaglianone; Teleplay by : Daniele Cesarano	6 October 2017
Aureliano is summoned by Livia, who informs him of the allocation of Vatican land to the Samurai. She offers to return to the family to join forces with Samurai, on the condition of repudiating Isabelle. Sara breaks it off definitively with Lele and returns to her husband, who however, frightened by a raid by Aureliano, asks for a divorce. Spadino is destroyed by the break with Aureliano. Back home, he takes advantage of the power vacuum left by his brother (who is now in a coma) to take his place as head of household and agrees to have sex with his wife to give her children. At town hall, Taccon, although reluctant to sign Ostia papers, is convinced by Cinaglia. Now considered the new boss of Ostia, Aureliano repudiates Isabelle and goes to a meeting with Samurai, while Livia stays at home with a few men. Samurai appears well protected and proposes to Aureliano to enter the affair with a greater share of that promised to his father. Aureliano ousts Livia from the clan and welcomes Isabelle again, to whom he explains that it was all a charade to get rid of his sister. Cinaglia is now a member of Samurai, together they meet with the Sicilians in order to decide the next candidate for mayor of Rome. Cinaglia is expelled from his party, but he remains indifferent and decides to participate in the elections on his list. Sara seeks a new job in the Vatican, where she finds a corrupt cardinal interested in involving her in the immigrant reception business. Subsequently, he went to the Countess, to whom he swore to take revenge. Aureliano and Spadino, now both heads of their respective families, meet one last time. Although they are now enemies and have the opportunity to kill each other, they do not. Meanwhile, Livia succeeds in tricking herself back into the house, where she kills Isabelle. Lele has a talk with Mara and decides to join the police-force, even though while trying on a uniform in front of a mirror, he shows a malicious smile, suggesting that his choice is motivated more by opportunism than by meaning.

=== Season 2 (2019) ===
No. overall	No. in season	Italian title English title	Directed by	Written by	Original release date
11	1	"Trovatela" "Find Her"	Andrea Molaioli	Story by : Barbara Petronio, Ezio Abbate, Fabrizio Bettelli; Teleplay by : Barbara Petronio	22 February 2019
Three months after the end of the first season, Livia returns to Rome, having fled after killing Isabelle. Arriving at a hotel she decides to call Romolo, Aureliano's right hand man, to establish a meeting with her brother, to hand over the land of Ostia to Samurai, because with her signature, Aureliano will no longer be able to sell in the area. Samurai tries to track down Livia. Meanwhile Spadino tries to take command of his family and subdue his mother now that his brother is in a coma. He finds Livia Adami and takes her to his home. Spadino lives out his homosexuality quietly with his lover named Teo. He becomes convinced that with Livia, he can have the monopoly on the port of Ostia. However, his mother hinders his ambitions, going to the Samurai to ask for an agreement which involves a trade for Livia. Meanwhile Lele, after the death of his father, becomes a police inspector, and convinces himself to carry out his work without obstacles, but Samurai continues to threaten and forces him to search for Livia. Meanwhile, Rome is also coming to terms with the arrival of illegal immigrants who threaten the ideology of the country. Cinaglia took the opportunity to win the election, and was interviewed by Adriano, a radio speaker, who saw him as a great figure. Meanwhile, Sara and her association face difficulties with the lack of the necessary funds for housing for the migrants. Moreover, the cardinal who is helping her with her association is investigated and arrested. Lele meets with Spadino to tell him about Samurai, and he decides to forgive him despite what happened months before. A few hours after the results of the vote in Rome, Cinaglia wins by a larger margin than expected. Meanwhile, Aureliano had been robbed, killing the man he believes robbed him at a carousel, in front of his daughter Nadia. Later, Spadino and Lele decide to find Livia and take her to Aureliano and ask him, in return, to untie their clan again.
12	2	"Conseguenze" "Consequences"	Andrea Molaioli	Barbara Petronio, Ezio Abbate, Fabrizio Bettelli	22 February 2019
In a flashback, Livia and Aureliano are very close as teenagers. In the present, Romolo tells Aureliano not to kill Livia. After Livia has returned home to her brother, she apologizes to him for what she did. Samurai reaches out to Adelaide to ask her what happened to Livia. Cinaglia enjoys post-electoral success. Meanwhile, the Countess visits the politician seeking an agreement. Cristiana, a fellow police inspector, asks Lele for more important roles, intending to work on the street. Adelaide decides to go to Samurai to tell him what she discovered about Livia, and decides to punish her son by locking him up for a whole day in a room. Samurai once again asks Lele for help in getting in touch with Livia. But he does not want to betray his friends again and tries to warn Aureliano. Samuari does not like the radio speaker, who is visited by Boiardo. Cinaglia accepts the invitation of the Countess, but not before meeting Samurai to tell him that he wants to ally himself with the right and not with the left but Samurai does not think it is a good idea. Nadia confronts Aureliano and tells him that she wants to be a part of his family, without avenging her father, but Aureliano ignores her. On the land of Ostia, a temporary tent city is organized to welcome migrants, something that Samurai does not like. Lele asks Cristiana to take him to Villa Adami, to warn Aureliano of the arrival of Samurai, telling her a lie that it was for an anti-drug operation. Just as Lele is about to arrive at Aureliano's house, Samurai arrives from the back with Boiardo, breaks in, and forces Livia to sign the documents transferring the Ostia lands to him. As Samurai is about leave, Aureliano threatens him, prompting Samurai to kill Livia, who dies in her brother's arms.
13	3	"Più vicino" "Closer"	Andrea Molaioli	Story by : Barbara Petronio, Ezio Abbate, Fabrizio Bettelli; Teleplay by : Fabrizio Bettelli	22 February 2019
Aureliano decides to bury Livia at sea. When he returned home, he discovered that his men had abandoned him, including Romolo, bringing their guns and drugs with them. Cinaglia accepts the interview on the radio. Spadino's mother looks for new alliances with Samurai. Aureliano decides to team up again with his old friends. Meanwhile, the Sicilian mafia asks for explanations from Samurai as to why the lands of Ostia has become a destination for migrants. Cinaglia goes to Ostia, in the refugee camp and finds Sara there. Shortly afterwards Samurai also arrives, reminding Sara who is in charge and the threat in front of everyone, physically attacking her. Cristiana decides to meet Mara, who for 10 years, had been Franco's partner, Gabriele's father. Mara tells Cristiana that her father had seen him with Samurai a few days before he died and that she is also investigating this. Samurai decides to go directly to the Vatican but does not find support. Meanwhile, Aureliano asks for help from Nadia to recover his weapons from the girl's cousins. Aureliano looks for the weapons, about to be wounded, and Nadia saves him at the last minute. Meanwhile, Cristiana follows Lele, who meets with Guerri, forced to obey Samurai's requests. Aureliano and Nadia are hiding in a hotel run by his clan that has been abandoned for about 20 years. Spadino is spying on Samurai, with the intent to kill him, but stops at the last minute to overhear that he is supporting Cinaglia. Samurai and his clan go to the refugee camp and set it on fire causing chaos. Sara is saved by Lele at the camp while Samurai escapes.
14	4	"A testa in giù" "Upside Down"	Piero Messina	Story by : Barbara Petronio, Ezio Abbate, Fabrizio Bettelli; Teleplay by : Ezio Abbate	22 February 2019
The Sicilian boss does not like the new alliance that Cinaglia wants to make with Samurai, but in the end the older boss decides to trust him, but warns that if something goes wrong, he and his family will come to a bad end. The Sicilian bosses then decide to listen to Cinaglia and meet Samurai. If the right and Cinaglia win, then they will be in charge together with the new politicians. If the left wins, Samurai will need a new ally. Spadino meets his boyfriend who invites him to a concert, to which Spadino declines. Meanwhile, Angelica and her father make a new deal with Adelaide: she will go to take a load of drugs with Spadino's cousin in Abruzzo, but then she will be in charge. The two risk being stopped by the police but thanks to the Angelica, they manage to bring the goods home. Cinaglia understands that the alliance with the right, despite what happened in Ostia, will not be easy. Meanwhile, Aureliano, Lele and Spadino try to understand who Cinaglia is and who Samurai is collaborating with. Meanwhile, Cristiana takes pictures of Lele with Samurai. In the end the three decide to ask Cinaglia to team up with them: they will make a slaughterhouse in Ostia that will allow his party to gain votes. They will ally themselves and he will be able to get rid of Samurai because they will be the ones to command Ostia. Cinaglia decides to accept the proposal. Spadino regains his mother's trust thanks to Angelica's pregnancy: now he can go home and command.
15	5	"La culla" "The Crib"	Piero Messina	Story by : Barbara Petronio, Ezio Abbate, Fabrizio Bettelli; Teleplay by : Fabrizio Bettelli	22 February 2019
Aureliano and Spadino hijack a bus that brings immigrants into the camp of Ostia in order to cause chaos, forcing the driver to lie saying he was attacked by migrants. In the meantime, however, the camp is cleared and Samurai's men take action so that the harbour works can begin. Cristiana tries to talk to Gabriele to see if she can find out anything. Lele does not speak to her and decides to seduce her. Samurai seeks new allies on the left. At the Ostia police station, the migrants who were accused of having beaten the bus driver escaped. Lele goes to Aureliano's hotel with his fellow police officers and pretends not to know him, to take him to the police station. Adelaide offers her support to Nadia's cousins. Adriano confronts Cinaglia and tells him that he has discovered his alliance with Samurai. Meanwhile, in Ostia, people protest after what happened with the migrants. At the police station, Mara interrogates Aureliano and asks him if he knows Lele; he claims that he has only ever seen him in the gym. Angelica gets her first ultrasound, with emotion from Spadino. Meanwhile, the cardinal, after being humiliated by Samurai, decides to ally himself with Sara, but is killed by Samurai who pushes him down a staircase. Cristiana continues to try to find out what Lele is hiding, who then tells him that she is trying to find an agreement with Aureliano to buy some families from Ostia. Cristiana then tells him that it was Mara who contacted her and asked her to investigate him. Romolo tells Aureliano that the Anacletis are doing business with his old allies and with all the families of Ostia. Cinaglia sees the right-wing politician with whom he wants to form an alliance and tells him that the "brothel" of Ostia has organized him to increase the advantage in the polls. Aureliano without scruples kills Nadia's cousins, who do not want to get back in business with him, burning them alive. Cinaglia reaches Adriano on the radio and asks him not to talk about what he has discovered. In exchange, he tells him who his new allies are, and Adriano agrees. Meanwhile in Ostia, everything is ready for the meeting of Aureliano, bringing the corpses of Nadia's cousins to show who is in charge.
16	6	"È guerra" "It's War"	Piero Messina	Story by : Barbara Petronio, Ezio Abbate, Fabrizio Bettelli; Teleplay by : Ezio Abbate	22 February 2019
In a flashback, Romolo saves a young Aureliano life from a killer. In the present, Mara goes to Samurai and asks him the truth about Lele, but he does not tell her anything. Cinaglia publicly declares his voting intentions and asks his voters to vote for the right. Adelaide would like to make a war with other families, even if Angelica and Spadino claim to have the command. Teo shows up at the Anacleti house because he has not heard from Spadino in days. Spadino's cousin suspects that there is something between the two. Adriano goes to Samurai to talk about what he discovered on Cinaglia. Samurai then discovers that Spadino, Lele and Aureliano have once again become allies. Samurai then goes to Cinaglia's ex-wife to tell him what he has been up to. Spadino warns Aureliano of what his mother wants to do. The boys have a new plan to make a war in advance that can also serve Cinaglia for its purposes. Sara tells Cinaglia that she wants an immigration commission so that with her not-for-profit organization, she can take care of the management of the refugees. Aureliano is helped by Nadia to understand how to move about in the piazza of Ostia. Samurai decides to tell Mara a half-truth in that Lele killed Tullio Adami and that Franco was killed on purpose. Before the gang war begins in Ostia, Mara goes to Lele and threatens him with a gun, telling him that she has discovered the truth. Spadino, who is in the same place, hears everything, but hits Mara in the back to help Lele. Mara continues to talk about Lele's father and that he had said that he did not want to have a son like him, triggering anger in Lele, who drowns her in the sea. Aureliano understands that the Anacletis are going to Romolo and tries to save him, but does not succeed. However, Nadia and Aureliano manage to escape before the intervention of the Police.
17	7	"Santi Pietro e Paolo" "Saints Peter and Paul"	Andrea Molaioli	Story by : Barbara Petronio, Ezio Abbate, Fabrizio Bettelli; Teleplay by : Barbara Petronio & Camilla Buizza	22 February 2019
In a flashback, a young Spadino remembers his relationship with his father before he died. In the present, Samurai's right-hand man goes to Lele and picks him up bringing him to Samurai where he beats him. Meanwhile Spadino has decided to tell Aureliano what he knew from Mara, but Aureliano decides not to kill Lele, because he also killed his father. Adriano also arrives to where Lele is being held. Meanwhile, Sara proposes to kill the Countess, so that she can take her place, also having a pending account with her. Cristiana is unable to get in touch with Lele and decides to go to his house, finding his door had been broken down and clothes dirty with sand, realizing that he killed Mara. Samurai calls Cinaglia: he threatens him and tells him that he will hurt his family if he does not show up for a meeting. He manages to warn his wife in time, hiding in a hotel with the nanny and the children. He then warns Sara of what is happening, and asks Aureliano for a gun to bring to the meeting. When Amedeo arrives, Samurai threatens him, but he grabs the gun and shoots Adriano, injuring him and bringing Lele to safety. Meanwhile, during mass, the Countess is killed by Aureliano shortly before she arrives at the event. Cinaglia's wife witnesses the scene and Aureliano forgets to rob the Countess, making her death seem like a tragic accident rather than murder. In the meantime, Spadino and Angelica have made it clear to Adelaide that they are in charge. Spadino and Aureliano have made a pact to divide the piazza of Ostia.
18	8	"Dimmi la verità" "Tell Me the Truth"	Andrea Molaioli	Story by : Barbara Petronio, Ezio Abbate, Fabrizio Bettelli; Teleplay by : Barbara Petronio	22 February 2019
In a flashback, a young Lele holds his father at gunpoint to try to get him to tell him what had happened to his mother. In the present, Aureliano warns Cinaglia and Sara of the fact that Alice, Cinaglia's wife, saw him kill the Countess. The Countess' death is not being talked about as being a murder, and the polls leave the party of the right and the left very close. Lele, at Cristiana's house, decides to confess everything by talking about the business with Samurai and how life in the last few months has been chaos for him. But when she goes to her bedroom to change, she sees that she has taken his clothes and realizes that she is hiding something. Cristiana tells him that she wants only one thing: to get to work for Samurai, tired of her honest life. Lele discourages her for her safety, but she threatens him with a gun and asks him to take her to Samurai. Angelica and Nadia begin to work together, and in Ostia the shop starts again. Spadino's lover is kidnapped by Spadino's suspicious cousin, forcing him to tell him what is going on between him and Spadino. Cinaglia convinces his wife to announce that she has witnessed the Countess being killed by a migrant, thus favouring the right, but the news will not be released until the next day because it was intercepted by a policeman who works for Samurai. Therefore, Samurai again threatens Cinaglia and Sara who are then forced to come to terms with him. Lele parks in an isolated place, manages to disarm Cristiana, stunning and leaving her. Meanwhile Samurai goes to Adriano to ask him to spread the news of the Countess' murder on the radio. Adriano declines, but Samurai points a gun at him, to force him. Lele, Aureliano and Spadino meet where Lele confesses what he did for Samurai, and tired of a criminal life that he feels does not belong to him, shoots himself in the head. Spadino and Aureliano leave in shock. Soon after, Cristiana arrives and finds Lele dead and takes the gun. Meanwhile the election results arrive and the right wins with 54% of the votes. Spadino receives a message from his cousin and goes to the house where his lover is locked up. Waiting for him is Alex, who tells him he will tell everyone about their relationship unless he gives up his command. In order to avoid losing the command, Spadino kills his lover and leaves. Cinaglia meets the Sicilian boss and then also Samurai who tells him that Aureliano and Spadino must be excluded from the agreements. Sara instead wants to focus on the business of migrants, and she and Cinaglia kiss. Aureliano and Spadino go to recover Lele's body and burn it. Adriano looks for Aureliano and Spadino and tells him that Cinaglia has once again allied with Samurai and proposes an alliance to them. Manfredi awakes from his coma in hospital.

=== Season 3 (2020) ===
No. overall	No. in season	Italian title English title	Directed by	Written by	Original release date
19	1	"Giubileo" "Jubilee"	Arnaldo Catinari	Story by : Ezio Abbate, Fabrizio Bettelli, Andrea Nobile, Camilla Buizza, Marco Sani; Teleplay by : Ezio Abbate & Fabrizio Bettelli	30 October 2020
Aureliano and Spadino plot revenge against Samurai for the suicide of Lele. Samurai meets Flavio, the son of Romolo, to get to Aureliano and has moved to get Manfredi, who is in rehabilitation for his injury, to get house arrest in exchange for a new alliance for the Ostia affair as long as Aureliano and Spadino are ousted. After having made an agreement with Monaschi, Samurai and Badali have a meeting with Cinaglia to organize themselves in view of the Papal Jubilee promoted by Cardinal Fiorenzo Nascari. Samurai and his friend Sibilla are preparing for a big profit. Cinaglia approaches the prelate but Nascari reveals that the event will take place in Africa. Aureliano, to keep the peace with the Anacletis, has to solve the problem of Flavio who had stabbed one of their men; Aureliano meets him, who is repentant, but warns him that Samurai's men are coming to kill him and the two manage to escape. Cinaglia tries to charm his wife Alice by showing her a luxurious apartment that he wants to buy but she disdains what she is doing; meanwhile his mistress Sara will manage one of the largest reception centers in Europe in Sicily on Mafia land. Nadia and Angelica kidnap Cinaglia's wife and children in exchange for Samurai. Cinaglia thus lures Samurai into a trap where Aureliano and Spadino wait to ambush him. Aureliano shoots Samurai in each leg, while Spadino finishes him off by shooting him in the head. The three forge a new alliance for the Jubilee affair.
20	2	"Tortura" "Torture"	Arnaldo Catinari	Story by : Ezio Abbate, Fabrizio Bettelli, Andrea Nobile, Camilla Buizza, Marco Sani; Teleplay by : Andrea Nobile	30 October 2020
Alice decides to leave Cinaglia taking the children with her. Boiardo is determined to avenge Samurai's death and threatens Cinaglia to kill his wife and children if he finds out he is involved. Sibilla delivers Samurai's will to Adriano according to Samurai's wishes. The will included €1 million and a penthouse in Rome, but he refuses to accept. When Sibilla tells Spadino and Aureliano that the fate of the Jubilee is in the hands of Nascari and not Cinaglia's, they lock Cinaglia in the steaming sauna of his new home to intimidate him until he faints. Cinaglia tells them he is unable to act for fear of Boiardo. Meanwhile Angelica, Nadia and Flavio go to a bar in Northern Rome to talk to Titto Zaccardelli. Titto asks for a meeting with Aureliano, who tells him to eliminate Boiardo. Ferdinando Badali takes note that Spadino and Aureliano want to replace Samurai, and he makes an agreement with them. Titto, a Samurai confidante who controls Northern Rome, decides to side with Aureliano and Spadino and eliminates Boiardo and his men after luring them to a meet at his restaurant. Cinaglia engages the judge by offering him advice in his commission in exchange for granting house arrest to Manfredi. When Manfredi comes out of rehabilitation at the hospital, he meets with Cinaglia, who in exchange asks that Aureliano and Spadino be eliminated.
21	3	"La festa" "The Party"	Arnaldo Catinari	Story by : Ezio Abbate, Fabrizio Bettelli, Andrea Nobile, Camilla Buizza, Marco Sani; Teleplay by : Camilla Buizza	30 October 2020
Spadino is not happy with Manfredi's return home. Aureliano offers help to Badali manage his business at the port of Ostia and in exchange asks for the management of the kiosk, but Aureliano does not seem to be able to easily detach himself from the kiosk and one day drives out the workers by threatening them. Cinaglia meets Fabrizio, an old acquaintance of Nascari since the time of the mission in Gabon, where he tells Cinaglia the secrets of Nascari. Cinaglia meets Nascari and blackmails him by telling him that he has discovered that Vincent, his assistant of African origin, is in fact his son; Nascari decides that the first six months of the Jubilee will be held in Rome. Aureliano and Spadino press Nascari so that the whole event takes place in Rome by exposing the secret in front of Vincent. Nadia and Angelica supervise the shop in Northern Rome. Spadino, on the occasion of Manfredi's return home, announces that he has got his hands on the Jubilee deal and organizes a party at a disco with his family and Aureliano. During the party, Leo, an Anacleti confidante, quarrels with Aureliano, and Nadia intervenes by shooting him dead.
22	4	"Il processo" "The Trial"	Arnaldo Catinari	Story by : Ezio Abbate, Fabrizio Bettelli, Andrea Nobile, Camilla Buizza, Marco Sani; Teleplay by : Marco Sani	30 October 2020
Alex Anacleti tries to turn the whole family against Spadino for what happened at the party. Angelica senses that Manfredi is the one who sent Leo to the party to cause a fight, even though Spadino doesn't want to believe her. Aureliano manages to reach peace with the Anacletis in exchange for money, saving Nadia. Nascari meets Alice in a convent outside Rome and pushes her to report Cinaglia for what his involvement in crime; she tries to convince her husband to stop before reporting, but he realizes that Nascari has been talking to her, and ends up threatening her. Badali confronts Aureliano who has blocked the works in Ostia. Later, Titto, Nadia and Angelica are attacked and robbed by three men who shoot Nadia in the arm and kill one of the members of Titto's clan.
23	5	"Fratelli" "Brothers"	Arnaldo Catinari	Story by : Ezio Abbate, Fabrizio Bettelli, Andrea Nobile, Camilla Buizza, Marco Sani; Teleplay by : Ezio Abbate & Fabrizio Bettelli	30 October 2020
Spadino finds the three men, and has two of them killed in order to intimidate the third into revealing who sent them. Cinaglia confronts Nascari about his conversations with Alice. Nascari says he will try to dissuade Alice from reporting him in exchange for Aureliano and Spadino to be ousted. Nascari tries to dissuade Alice, but she is now determined to report Cinaglia and he cannot make her change her mind. Cinaglia, with the agreements made with Manfredi and Nascari, convinces Badali that Aureliano and Spadino must be ousted. After Spadino learns that Manfredi was behind the attack on Nadia and Angelica, he confronts him, but in the struggle, Spadino cannot bring himself to kill his brother Manfredi. As Manfredi is chauffeured, the car is attacked by Aureliano who kills two of the men, but when he sees that Manfredi is holding Angelica hostage with a knife, he is forced to retreat.
24	6	"Risvegli" "Awakenings"	Arnaldo Catinari	Story by : Ezio Abbate, Fabrizio Bettelli, Andrea Nobile, Camilla Buizza, Marco Sani; Teleplay by : Ezio Abbate & Fabrizio Bettelli	30 October 2020
Angelica wakes up in the hospital after losing her baby prematurely. Cinaglia goes to the convent to try to convince Alice not to report him. When he fails, he pushes her off a cliff to her death and stages her suicide by using her phone to send a farewell message to himself. Spadino secretly takes Angelica from the hospital. Spadino goes to his father-in-law's house where he convinces him to lure Manfredi to a meeting so Spadino can kill him. However, Angelica realizes that it is a trap for Spadino after Alex tells her that Manfredi wants to see her. She manages to warn Nadia who in turn calls Aureliano. Spadino is brought to a junkyard by his father-in-law, and he becomes surrounded by his family and his brother. Just before Manfredi can kill Spadino, Aureliano arrives with his car to disperse the group. After a bloody shooting, Spadino finds himself unarmed and Aureliano running out of ammunition. Meanwhile, as Alex and Angelica drive, Nadia kills him with a headshot while stopped at a red light, and Angelica goes with her. Meanwhile, the elder Badali goes to Sibilla's office to killer her and burn it down with the intent to eliminate a Samurai folder containing information about his family, not knowing that it was already sent to Cinaglia. Aureliano and Spadino, in the middle of the ambush, exchange a long look, then Aureliano says goodbye to him and comes out from behind a car and kills the last two men, but while also being mortally wounded. Aureliano collapses into Spadino's arms. Manfredi, injured in the fray, is finally killed by Spadino by stabbing his neck. Flavio, Nadia and Angelica arrive at the junkyard, but Spadino and Aureliano are gone. Meanwhile, the Pope formalizes the Jubilee to be held in Rome and Badali and Cinaglia make new agreements. Spadino buries Aureliano at sea just as Aureliano had done with his sister. Angelica finds Spadino on the shore and he explains that he will not go home with her because he no longer needs his family and cannot give her the love she deserves. Angelica cries out for him while he continues walking. Spadino drives off and cries out in despair.
