= Suburra (disambiguation) =

Suburra is a neighborhood of Rome.

Suburra may also refer to:

- Suburra (film), 2015 Italian neo-noir crime film
  - Suburra, a 2013 crime novel by Giancarlo De Cataldo and Carlo Bonini on which the film was based
  - Suburra: Blood on Rome, an Italian television crime drama based on the film
