= Mrs Playmen =

2025 Italian television miniseries

- Genre: Drama
- Written by: Mario Ruggeri; Eleonora Cimpanelli; Chiara Laudani; Sergio Leszczynski; Alessandro Sermoneta
- Directed by: Riccardo Donna
- Starring: Carolina Crescentini; Filippo Nigro; Giuseppe Maggio
- Composer: Santi Pulvirenti
- Country of origin: Italy
- Original language: Italian
- No. of series: 1
- No. of episodes: 7

Production
- Producer: Benedetta Fabbri
- Cinematography: Federico Schlatter
- Production company: Aurora TV

Original release
- Network: Netflix
- Release: 12 November 2025

Mrs Playmen is an Italian television miniseries directed by Riccardo Donna and starring Carolina Crescentini. Produced by Aurora TV, it was internationally released on Netflix on 12 November 2025. The series is a dramatization of real life events of Adelina Tattilo, the publisher of the adult magazine Playmen.

== Cast ==
- Carolina Crescentini as Adelina Tattilo
- Filippo Nigro as Chartroux
- Giuseppe Maggio as Luigi Poggi
- Francesca Colucci as Elsa
- Domenico Diele as Andrea De Cesari
- Francesco Colella as Saro Balsamo
- Lidia Vitale as Lella
- Giampiero Judica as Don Rocco
