= Rosa Diletta Rossi =

Italian actress (born 1988)

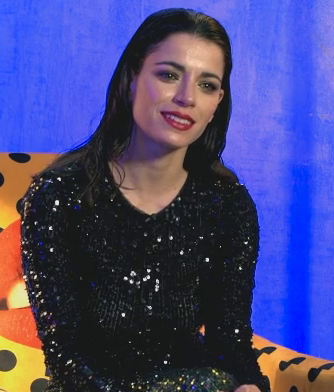
- Rosa Diletta Rossi in 2022
- Born: Rosa Diletta Rossi; 18 October 1988 (age 37); Rome, Lazio, Italy
- Occupation: Actress
- Height: 1.65 m (5 ft 4.96 in)

Rosa Diletta Rossi (born 18 October 1988) is an Italian actress.

== Biography ==
Born in 1988 in Rome to a teacher mother and a doctor father, both of Apulian origins, Rosa Diletta Rossi has three brothers. In addition to Italian, she speaks fluent English and speaks the Roman, Apulian, Venetian and Sicilian dialects.

== Career ==
She graduated from the Eugenio Montale classical high school, before joining the Piccola Compagnia Piero Gabrielli directed by Roberto Gandini as a teenager, with whom he appeared in 2008–2009 in Il pedone rosso, by Alessandro Berti, Giuseppe Manfridi and Attilio Marangon. In 2012, with Danilo Nigrelli, he presented the play An Armenian Dinner by Paola Ponti at the India Theatre in Rome.

She later attended a preparatory course at the Stabile Theatre in Genoa and the specialization school for actors, directed by Jurij Ferrini, in Turin.

Her film debut, after a few short films, came in 2012 with Simone Spada's Maìn – La casa della felicità, in which she played the role of the protagonist's sister.

Her television debut was in 2010 with the miniseries Mia madre by Ricky Tognazzi, in which she played Lucia, daughter of the protagonist couple. In 2013 she played Chiara in the second season of Che Dio ci aiuti; then Suburra: Blood on Rome (2017–2020) in the role of Alice, wife of Amedeo Filippo Nigro; Carlo & Malik in the role of Alba, forensic doctor and daughter of Commissioner Carlo Guerrieri, played by Claudio Amendola. In 2023 she played the role of the protagonist Maria Corleone in the series of the same name. In the same year she played the role of Irene in the miniseries Per Elisa – Il caso Claps.

== Filmography ==
=== Cinema ===
Year	Title	Role	Director
2012	Maìn – La casa della felicità	Felicina	Simone Spada
2014	Supermanz		Riccardo Papa
2014	Pasolini	Patrizia	Abel Ferrara
2017	Fortunata	Rosa	Sergio Castellitto
2018	La profezia dell'armadillo	Owner	Emanuele Scaringi
2019	An Almost Ordinary Summer (Croce e delizia)	Carolina	Simone Godano
2020	Il ladro di giorni	Bianca	Guido Lombardi
2022	Belli ciao	Aurora	Gennaro Nunziante
2022	Hill of Vision	Anna	Roberto Faenza
2024	Martedì e venerdì	Simona	Fabrizio Moro and Alessio De Leonardis

=== Televisión ===
Year	Title	Role	Director	Network	Notes
2010	Mia madre	Lucia	Ricky Tognazzi	Rai 1	Television miniseries
2011	Don Matteo 8	Claudia Boratti	Salvaore Basile	Rai 1	Television series, episode 21
2012	Squadra antimafia – Palermo oggi	Michela Rizzo		Canale 5	Television series, episode 3
2013	Che Dio ci aiuti 2	Chiara Alfieri		Rai 1	Television series, 16 episodes
2014	Per amore del mio popolo		Antonio Frazzi	Rai 1	Television series, 2 episodes
2014	Il restauratore 2			Rai 1	Television series
2015	Grand Hotel		Luca Ribuoli	Rai 1	Television miniseries
2017	Sorelle		Cinzia TH Torrini	Rai 1	Television series
2017	Questo nostro amore	Caterina	Luca Ribuoli y Isabella Leoni	Rai 1	Television series, 6 episodes
2017–2020	Suburra: Blood on Rome (Suburra – La serie)	Alice Cinaglia	Andrea Molaioli, Arnaldo Catinari, Giuseppe Capotondi, Piero Messina and Michele Placido	Netflix	Television series, 17 episodes
2018	Rocco Chinnici – È così lieve il tuo bacio sulla fronte	Angela	Michele Soavi	Rai 1	TV movie
2018	Questo nostro amore 80	Caterina	Luca Ribuoli and Isabella Leoni	Rai 1	Television series
2018–presente	Carlo & Malik (Nero a metà)	Alba Guerrieri	Marco Pontecorvo, Claudio Amendola and Enrico Rosati	Rai 1	Television series
2019	Figli del destino	Maria	Francesco Miccichè and Marco Spagnoli	Rai 1	Docu-fiction
2021	Hashishins	Eva	Francesco De Vecchis and Matteo Zelli	Prime Video	Television miniseries
2023–2025	Maria Corleone	Maria Corleone	Mauro Mancini	Canale 5	Television series, 16 episodes
2023	Per Elisa – Il caso Claps	Irene Nardiello	Marco Pontecorvo	Rai 1	Television miniseries, 6 episodes
2024	Folle d'amore – Alda Merini	Alda Merini young	Roberto Faenza	Rai 1	TV movie

=== Short film ===
Year	Title	Role	Director
2006	Ipotesi su Troiane		Emanuele Faina
2010	Anna e Maya	Anna	Andrea Serafini
2010	Orizzonti		Sibilla Barbieri
2011	Lo sconosciuto		Raffaele Del Cimmuto
2011	Tre binari		Riccardo Papa
2011	Canto di Natale – Visioni dal futuro		Riccardo Papa
2012	Hertz		Riccardo Papa
2016	Bisogna aver coraggio		Elisa Fuksas
2020	TOB.IA	Agata	Emanuele Sana
2020	Principessa	Elena	Riccardo Fabrizi
2023	Golden Shopping Arcade	Clara	Francesco Ricci Lotteringi

== Theater ==
Year	Title	Author	Adaptation	Director	Theater
2001	La festa dei 100 ragazzi			Roberto Gandini	
2002	Le nuove avventure di Pinocchio				
2003	Dio	Woody Allen		Carlo Emilio Lerici	
2004	Sarto per signora	Georges Feydeau		Carlo Emilio Lerici	
2007	Il Purgatorio	Dante Alighieri		Roberto Gandini	
2008	Il cerchio magico			Roberto Gandini	
2008	Il pedone rosso	Alessandro Berti, Giuseppe Manfridi and Attilio Marangon		Roberto Gandini	
2009	C'era due volte	Gianni Rodari		Roberto Gandini	
2010	La storia della bambina invisibile	Gianni Rodari		Roberto Gandini	
2011	Le Mannare	Stefano Benni		Federico Grippo	
2011	Canto di Natale		Tiziano Panici and Alice Spisa	Tiziano Panici	
2012	Una cena armena	Paola Ponti		Danilo Nigrelli	
2014	Le avventure di Pinocchio		Tiziano Panici and Alice Spisa		
2015	L'ora del Diavolo				Sacred Theaters
