= Carlotta Antonelli =

Italian actress (born 1995)

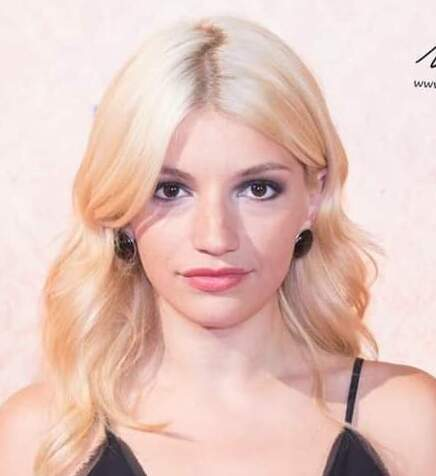
- Carlotta Antonelli
- Born: 25 July 1995 (age 30); Rome, Italy
- Occupation: Actress
- Years active: 2016–present

Carlotta Antonelli (born 25 July 1995) is an Italian actress. She's best known for her role as Angelica Sale in the Netflix series Suburra: Blood on Rome (2017-2020).

== Filmography ==
=== Film ===
- Bangla (2019)
- Morrison (2021)
- Takeaway (2021)

=== Television ===
- Solo (2016)
- Suburra: Blood on Rome (2017-2020)
- Immaturi - La serie (2018)
- Vivi e lascia vivere (2020)
- Bangla - La serie (2022)
- Bang Bang Baby (2022)
- Suburræterna (2023)
- Everybody Loves Diamonds (2023)
