= On My Skin (2018 film) =

2018 film by Alessio Cremonini

- Directed by: Alessio Cremonini
- Written by: Alessio Cremonini; Lisa Nur Sultan
- Produced by: Andrea Occhipinti; Luigi Musini; Olivia Musini
- Starring: Alessandro Borghi; Jasmine Trinca; Milvia Marigliano
- Cinematography: Matteo Cocco
- Production company: Cinemaundici
- Distributed by: Lucky Red / Netflix
- Release dates: 29 August 2018 (Venice); 12 September 2018
- Running time: 100 minutes
- Country: Italy
- Language: Italian

On My Skin (Italian: Sulla mia pelle) is an Italian drama film directed by Alessio Cremonini, starring Alessandro Borghi. The film is based on the real story of the last days of Stefano Cucchi, a 31-year-old building surveyor who died in 2009 during preventive custody, victim of police brutality.

== Plot ==
On the evening of 15 October 2009, Stefano Cucchi, a young building surveyor, is brought to Regina Coeli prison in Rome after being found in possession of some packs of hashish, 2 grams of cocaine and a pill of a medicine for epilepsy.

During precautionary custody, Cucchi is beaten up by police officers, despite he continues to deny that he has been treated so cruelly. Despite Stefano's requests to choose his own lawyer, he is assigned a public defender, and the judge establishes that Stefano must remain in custody in Regina Coeli. Despite several efforts, Stefano's parents, Giovanni and Rita, and sister Ilaria are never allowed to visit him.

On 22 October, Stefano dies due to his many injuries. This brings his family, led by his sister Ilaria, to start a battle for the truth and to try to find the people responsible for Stefano's death, once they realized, looking at his corpse in the morgue, that he has been savagely beaten.

== Cast ==
- Alessandro Borghi as Stefano Cucchi. In English American dubbing voices Todd Haberkorn.
- Jasmine Trinca as Ilaria Cucchi, Stefano's sister
- Max Tortora as Giovanni Cucchi, Stefano's father
- Milvia Marigliano as Rita Calore Cucchi, Stefano's mother

== Film epilogue ==
The film epilogue reads: "Stefano Cucchi was the 148th person to die in prison in 2009. The total number of deaths that year was 172. Doctors and forensic experts have not yet found a scientific explanation they can agree on for Stefano Cucchi's death. In their son's apartment, Stefano Cucchi's parents found over a kilo of hashish and 130 grams of cocaine, which they reported to the police straightaway. In the first trial for Stefano Cucchi's death, all of the defendants were acquitted. After a further investigation by the public prosecutor, on July 10th 2017 the judge for preliminary hearings indicted three Carabinieri for involuntary manslaughter and two others for slander and forgery of public documents. After Stefano's death, Ilaria Cucchi, his parents Rita and Giovanni and lawyer Fabio Anselmo embarked on a fight for the truth. In 2017 they set up a non-profit organization in Stefano's name to defend citizens' human and civil rights.

== Release ==
The film premiered on 29 August 2018 in the "Horizons" section of the 75th Venice International Film Festival, where it was the opening film. It was distributed simultaneously in Italian cinemas by Lucky Red and through the Netflix streaming service from 12 September 2018.

== Reception ==
On My Skin has an approval rating of 67% on review aggregator website Rotten Tomatoes, based on 6 reviews, and an average rating of 6.8/10.

=== Awards and nominations ===
==== David di Donatello Awards (2019) ====
- David di Donatello for Best Actor to Alessandro Borghi
- David di Donatello for Best Producer to Cinemaundici and Lucky Red
- David di Donatello for Best New Director to Alessio Cremonini
- David Giovani Award
- Nomination for David di Donatello for Best Film
- Nomination for David di Donatello for Best Supporting Actress to Jasmine Trinca
- Nomination for David di Donatello for Best Original Screenplay to Alessio Cremonini and Lisa Nur Sultan
- Nomination for David di Donatello for Best Makeup to Roberto Pastore
- Nomination for David di Donatello for Best Editing to Chiara Vullo
- Nomination for David di Donatello for Best Score to Mokadelic

==== Other awards ====
- Brian Award at the 75th Venice International Film Festival
