= Adamo Dionisi =

Italian actor (1965–2024)

- Born: 30 September 1965; Rome, Italy
- Died: 20 October 2024 (aged 59); Rome, Italy
- Occupation: Actor
- Years active: 2008–2024

Adamo Dionisi (30 September 1965 – 20 October 2024) was an Italian actor.

Dionisi most notably portrayed crime boss Manfredi Anacleti in the 2015 film Suburra by Stefano Sollima, and the related Netflix series Suburra: Blood on Rome (2017–2020).

== Life and career ==
Dionisi was the leader of the "Irriducibili", an ultra group of SS Lazio supporters. He was arrested in April 2001 by the DIGOS for a drug-related incident; just a few hours earlier, he had been involved in a brawl outside San Siro Stadium with members of the "Fossa dei Leoni" and "Brigate Rossonere", historic ultra groups of AC Milan, following a Milan-Lazio league match, sustaining a wound to his lip. He served his sentence in the Rebibbia prison in Rome, where he participated in various theatrical projects.

Once released, he decided to pursue an acting career. He made his debut in the 2008 film Chi nasce tondo..., which he co-wrote. After appearing as a character actor in various films, in 2014 he was chosen by Italian-American director Abel Ferrara to play the role of a Neapolitan guide in the biographical film Pasolini. In 2015, he portrayed boss Manfredi Anacleti, one of the main antagonists in Stefano Sollima's crime film Suburra. He reprised this role in the Netflix series Suburra: Blood on Rome, aired from 2017 to 2020. Other notable film appearances include Matteo Garrone's Dogman (2018) and Pietro Castellitto's Enea (2023).

Dionisi died after a brief illness at the Fatebenefratelli Hospital in Rome, on 20 October 2024. He was 59.

== Selected filmography ==
=== Film ===
- Your Whole Life Ahead of You (2008) – voice only
- Chi nasce tondo... (2008)
- Good Morning Aman (2009)
- Easy! (2011)
- Every Blessed Day (2012)
- The State-Mafia Pact (2014)
- Pasolini (2014)
- The Dinner (2014)
- Arance & martello (2014)
- Suburra (2015)
- Viale Giorgio Morandi (2017)
- Ugly Nasty People (2017)
- Dogman (2018)
- Famosa (2020)
- The Shift (2020)
- Morrison (2021)
- Enea (2023)
- Martedì e venerdì (2024)

=== Television ===
- Rocco Schiavone, 8 episodes (2016–2023)
- Suburra: Blood on Rome, 18 episodes (2017–2020)
