= Carlo & Malik =

2018 Italian-language television series

- Genre: Crime drama
- Created by: Giampaolo Simi; Vittorino Testa
- Starring: Claudio Amendola; Miguel Gobbo Diaz; Fortunato Cerlino; Rosa Diletta Rossi; Alessandro Sperduti; Margherita Vicario; Sandra Ceccarelli; Alessia Barela; Antonia Liskova; Angela Finocchiaro; Nicole Grimaudo; Gianluca Gobbi; Giorgia Salari; Caterina Guzzanti
- Country of origin: Italy
- Original language: Italian
- No. of seasons: 3
- No. of episodes: 36

Production
- Running time: 60 min.

Original release
- Network: Rai 1
- Release: November 19, 2018 – May 9, 2022

Carlo & Malik (Italian: Nero a metà) is an Italian television series directed by Marco Pontecorvo and broadcast in Italy from November 19, 2018, in prime time on Rai 1.

== Plot ==
Inspector Carlo Guerrieri of the Rione Monti police station in his investigations is flanked by the 28-year-old Malik Soprani, a deputy inspector who has just graduated from the academy, and by his daughter Alba, a medical examiner at the Institute of Forensic Medicine led by his mentor Giovanna Di Castro. Malik is originally from the Ivory Coast, was adopted by Alice and so he grew up and studied in Italy becoming an Italian citizen. His presence will cause havoc inside the police station, moreover, Alba will develop strong feelings for him, despite the fact that she is in a relationship with Riccardo and has recently moved in with him. Carlo comes from the street, he has not had a great career, he is stubborn and rebellious but very protective with his daughter he raised alone (he was widowed by Clara when Alba was one year old and has been a lover of newsagent Cristina for years), while Malik is ambitious and brilliant, so the two will inevitably get along. The team is completed by: Mario Muzo, chief superintendent originally from Naples and a very good friend of Carlo; Cinzia Repola, superintendent who, being pregnant, is relegated to office roles; Marco Cantabella, a very helpful young agent, and Malik's fellow mate; and Micaela Carta, the charming manager of the Mobile Police Squad who took over from Santagata.

It was released on November 19, 2018, on Rai 1.

== Episodes ==
Season	Episodes	Originally released	
Season	Episodes	First released	Last released
1	12	November 19, 2018	December 17, 2018
2	12	September 10, 2020	October 8, 2020
3	12	April 4, 2022	May 9, 2022

== Characters ==
- Claudio Amendola as Carlo Guerrieri (season 1–3).
  Well-liked inspector of his team, he had to raise his daughter Alba alone, following the abandonment of his wife Clara. He is a determined and introverted man inclined to bend the rules, which is why he often has disagreements with his superiors. He has a strong sensitivity that allows him to understand people on the fly. He will be indicted for the death of Bosca, a drug dealer with whom his wife was cheating on, but thanks to the joint efforts of Malik, Muzo, Marco and Cinzia he will be exonerated, as his wife Clara had murdered Bosca. He will get promoted to commissioner. He will remarry with Cristina, but their marriage will not last long, as Carlo will leave her for Marta, her colleague with whom he will fall in love. However, even the relationship between them will not last long, since the woman will leave Rome shortly after solving the murder of her son.
- Miguel Gobbo Diaz as Malik Soprani (season 1–3).
  Deputy Inspector originally from Ivory Coast, he was orphaned when his family died in the shipwreck of the boat that took them to Italy. Bold, intelligent and faultless, he always works with professionalism and detachment, he only believes in facts and rationality, which is why he often gives the impression of being insensitive. He is very successful with women, but eventually falls in love with Alba, with whom he will have a stormy affair, even if he then starts a relationship with Monica.
- Fortunato Cerlino as Mario Muzo (season 1–2, guest season 3).
  Chief Superintendent, he is the classic gruff with a difficult character. He and Malik often have disagreements, although he acknowledges his young colleague's good skills. He suffers from panic attacks, which he doesn't like to talk about very much. Carlo is practically his only friend, among other things, Carlo blindly trusts him. He is married to Olga, a charming colleague much younger than him, although he will later become a widower, in fact she will be killed by the criminal Leonardo Sfera, who was seeking revenge against Muzo who had arrested him for a crime of which he was not guilty.
- Rosa Diletta Rossi as Alba Guerrieri (season 1–3).
  She is Carlo's daughter, she works at the Institute of Forensic Medicine, she is an intelligent and passionate woman. Since her first meeting with Malik, the two will fall madly in love with each other, so much so that Alba will leave her boyfriend Riccardo for him. Alba and Carlo are very close, her father in fact, would do anything to protect her. Her relationship with Malik will go into crisis due to a lack of trust, so much so that Alba will enter in a relationship with her colleague Enea.
- Alessandro Sperduti as Marco Cantabella (season 1–3).
  Chosen agent, and old friend of Malik, the two have known each other since the academy. He is a kind boy but a little insecure. Although at the beginning of the series he has been in a relationship for many years with another woman; he only has eyes for Cinzia, with whom he begins a relationship after leaving his girlfriend. Marco and Cinzia will start a relationship, and he will be like a father to Cinzia's daughter, the two will discover they are expecting a baby and at the end of the second season, they will get married.
- Margherita Vicario as Cinzia Repola (season 1–3).
  Superintendent who became pregnant after having an affair with a married colleague of hers, Matteo Lisi. The latter did not want to take on his responsibilities as a father. She is an understanding, sweet and kind colleague. She and Marco Cantabella will fall in love. She will give birth to a girl, Emma, and later she will discover that she is expecting another baby from Marco; finally the two will marry in the finale of the second season.
- Sandra Ceccarelli as Alice Soprani (season 1).
  Malik's adoptive mother. She runs a center for immigrant people in Rome. She and her son love each other very much. Malik usually confides in Alice in her difficult moments, seeing her as a moral guide.
- Alessia Barela as Cristina (season 1–2, guest season 3).
  She is Carlo's second wife. She works as a news vendor. Shortly after her wedding, Carlo will cheat on her with Marta and decide to leave her having understood that even though he loves her, what he feels for her is not true love. Cristina will leave town by selling her newsstand.
- Antonia Liskova as Micaela Carta (season 1–2).
  Micaela Carta is the new head of the Mobile Squad, taking over from Santagata who has retired. She doesn't answer to no one and is ready to do anything to get what she wants. She and Malik were lovers, although Soprani will later lose all interest in her after falling in love with Alba. In fact, Micaela sometimes betrays a certain envy towards the other woman. When she is transferred, Carlo will take her place.
- Angela Finocchiaro as Giovanna Di Castro (season 1–3).
  Coroner and Alba's mentor, she is a bright but rather extravagant woman, she says everything that goes into her head. In many ways, she represents something of a confidant for Alba.
- Daphne Scoccia as Ottavia (season 1–3).
  She is Carlo's informant, she is a young single mother, she has always proved to be an excellent resource for Carlo, who, being fond of her, always tries in every way to keep her out of trouble.
- Roberto Citran as Elia Santagata (season 1).
  Former executive of the Mobile Squad now retired, and an old friend of Carlo. He will be arrested, guilty of being an accomplice of Bosca and Clara: in fact Santagata when he was a humble police officer stole drugs from the judicial depots and supplied them to Bosca, and in exchange Clara gave him the names of other drug dealers and corrupt officials, allowing in Santagata to make a career. He will be the one to reveal to Carlo that it was Clara who killed Bosca and that she is still alive.
- Valerio Di Benedetto as Matteo Lisi (season 1–3).
  Police officer, he will cheat on his wife with Cinzia, making her pregnant with Emma. Although at first he didn't want to have anything to do with the child, he will later decide to enter her life, even when Cinzia marries Marco. Despite the ups and downs, in the end Marco and Cinzia will agree to make him part of Emma's life.
- Caterina Shulha as Olga Sarteani (season 1–2).
  She is Muzo's wife, she works in the police, in the postal section, she is on good friendships with both Malik and Carlo. The marriage between Olga and Muzo has always been an unhappy marriage, in fact, even if they loved each other deeply, Muzo has always been unable to curb her jealousy. Olga will be killed by Leonardo Sfera, furthermore, following her death, it will be learned that Olga was pregnant.
- Nicole Grimaudo as Marta Moselli (season 2).
  She works for the police in the video surveillance section, Marta has a son named Paolo, who is also a policeman. She moved to Naples for a while, although she will then return to Rome to protect Paolo's interests after the latter got into trouble with the law. Paolo will be killed by Leonardo Sfera, who wanted to take revenge on Marta and Muzo who had indicted him for murder even though he was innocent. She and Carlo will fall in love with her, so much so that he will decide to leave his wife Cristina. Marta, after finding Sfera, will try to kill him, however she will be stopped by Carlo, limiting herself only to arrest him. She will leave Rome, and will return to Naples.
- Eugenio Franceschini as Enea Chiesa (season 2).
  He is a student of the faculty of forensic medicine, and Alba's new assistant; between the two, a spark immediately takes off, and although she is still in love with Malik, she will embark on a relationship with the man.
- Gianluca Gobbi as Lorenzo Bragadin (season 3)
- Giorgia Salari as Giulia Trevi (season 3)
- Caterina Guzzanti as Elisa Cori (season 3)

=== Recurring characters ===
- Margherita Laterza as Clara, wife of Guerrieri believed dead, but who will then return to Rome to turn herself in, to the police.
- Giulio Cristini as Riccardo, lawyer, Alba's former boyfriend
- Diego Ribon as Micaela Carta's superior
- Claudia Vismara as Monica Porta, psychologist and Malik's new girlfriend.
- Augusto Fornari as Benzi, forensics commissioner
- Emiliano Coltorti as Monaschi, manager of the Flying Squad
- David Sebasti as the commissioner
- Renato Marchetti as Giacomo Nusco, Guerrieri's colleague

== Filming locations ==
The series is set and was shot entirely in Rome, between the Rione Monti (headquarters of the Commissariat), the Rione Esquilino, the clubs overlooking the Tiber, the historic center and various suburban neighborhoods also inhabited by numerous immigrant communities.

== Production ==
The series is co-produced by Rai Fiction and Cattleya, in collaboration with Netflix. Given the excellent ratings, the production of a second season was confirmed, which was scheduled to air in September 2020. The show subsequently obtained a further renewal for a season 3. The third and last season aired in April 2022.

The second season did not go to Netflix internationally. Season one was removed from Netflix on April 1, 2022.
