= Giacomo Ferrara =

Italian actor (born 1990)

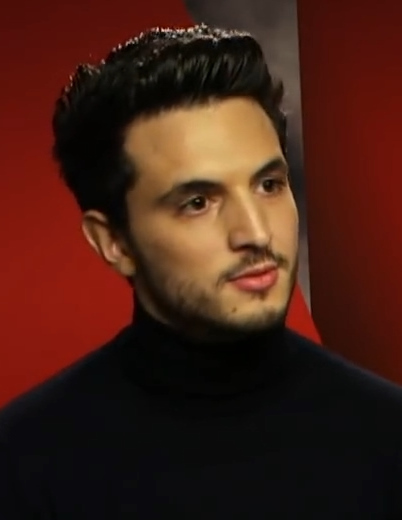
- Ferrara in 2017
- Born: 24 November 1990 (age 35); Chieti, Italy
- Occupation: Actor
- Years active: 2014–present
- Children: 1

Giacomo Ferrara (Italian pronunciation: [ˈdʒaːkomo ferˈraːra]; born 24 November 1990) is an Italian actor best known for his role as Alberto "Spadino" Anacleti in the 2015 neo-noir crime film Suburra and its subsequent spin-off series, Suburra: Blood on Rome (2017–2020) and Suburræterna (2023).

== Biography ==
Ferrara was born in Chieti and grew up between Chieti, Villamagna, and Pretoro. His parents are hotel managers. He later moved to Rome at the age of 18 to attend the Accademia Corrado Pani.

He has a daughter.

== Filmography ==
=== Film ===
Year	Title	Role	Ref.
2015	La prima volta (di mia figlia)	Young Alberto Santini	
2015	Suburra	Spadino Anacleti	
2017	Il permesso - 48 ore fuori	Angelo	
2017	Guarda in alto	Teco	
2021	Don't Kill Me	Ago	
2022	Ghiaccio	Giorgio	
2023	Thank You Guys	Aziz	
2024	Animali randagi	Toni	
2025	Fantasy Football Ruined Our Lives	Simone	

=== Television ===
Year	Title	Role	Notes	Ref.
2016	Don Matteo	Francesco Pica	1 episode	
2017–2020	Suburra: Blood on Rome	Alberto "Spadino" Anacleti	24 episodes	
2021	Alfredino - Una storia italiana	Maurizio Monteleone	2 episodes	
2023	Suburræterna	Alberto "Spadino" Anacleti	8 episodes	

=== Music videos ===
Year	Title	Artist	Role	Ref.
2019	"Vecchia novità"	Angelica	Himself	
