= Don't Kill Me =

2021 Italian film by Andrea De Sica

- Italian poster
- Italian: Non mi uccidere
- Directed by: Andrea De Sica
- Written by: Andrea De Sica; Antonio Le Fosse; Giacomo Mazzariol; Marco Raspanti; Romolo Re Salvador; Gianni Romoli; Eleonora Trucchi
- Based on: Non mi uccidere by Chiara Palazzolo
- Produced by: Marta Donzelli; Gregorio Paonessa
- Starring: Alice Pagani; Rocco Fasano; Silvia Calderoni; Fabrizio Ferracane; Sergio Albelli; Giacomo Ferrara; Anita Caprioli
- Cinematography: Francesco Di Giacomo
- Edited by: Pietro Morana
- Music by: Andrea De Sica; Andrea Farri
- Production companies: Vivo Film; Warner Bros. Entertainment Italia S.p.A.
- Distributed by: Warner Bros. Pictures
- Release date: 21 April 2021 (Italy)
- Running time: 90 minutes
- Country: Italy
- Language: Italian

Don't Kill Me (Italian: Non mi uccidere) is a 2021 Italian romantic horror film written and directed by Andrea De Sica, based on the novel Non mi uccidere by Chiara Palazzolo. It was released for digital download and video on demand in Italy on 21 April 2021 before being released internationally on Netflix in 2022.

== Premise ==
19-year-old Mirta dies of a drug overdose with her boyfriend, Robin. Now undead, she realizes that she must eat living humans in order to survive.

== Cast ==
- Alice Pagani as Mirta
- Rocco Fasano as Robin
- Silvia Calderoni as Sara
- Fabrizio Ferracane as Luca Bertozzi
- Sergio Albelli as Piero
- Giacomo Ferrara as Ago
- Anita Caprioli as Amalia

== Production ==
The film was shot in Alto Adige and Rome.
