= Alessandro Borghi (actor) =

Italian actor (born 1986)

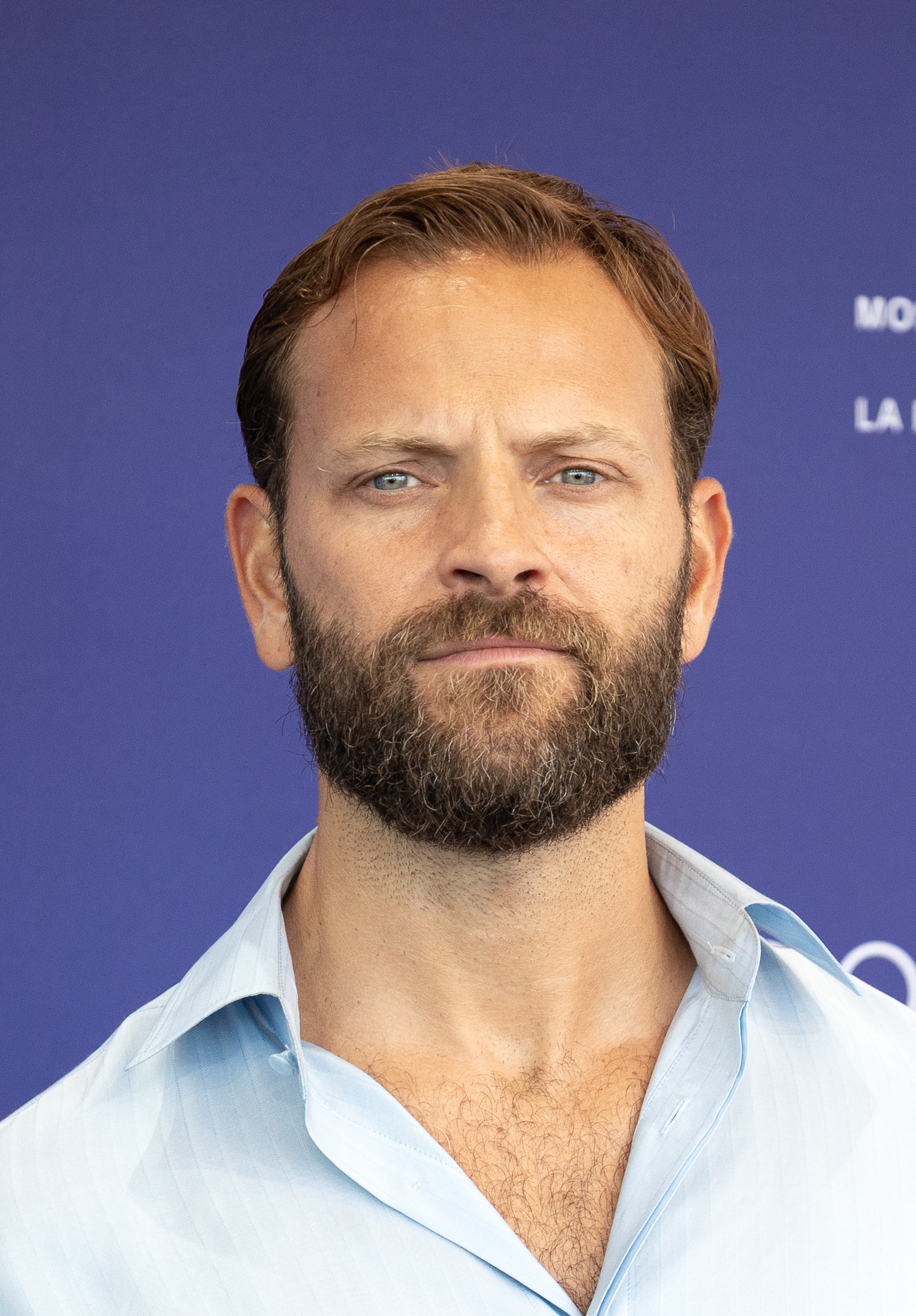
- Borghi in 2026
- Born: 19 September 1986 (age 39); Rome, Italy
- Occupations: Actor; producer
- Years active: 2006–present
- Height: 1.86 m (6 ft 1 in)

Alessandro Borghi (Italian: [alesˈsandro ˈborɡi]; born 19 September 1986) is an Italian actor and film producer. He won the David di Donatello for Best Actor in 2019 for his portrayal of building surveyor Stefano Cucchi, a victim of police brutality, in the film On My Skin.

He gained international attention for his leading role in the Netflix crime series Suburra: Blood on Rome (2017–2020) and his portrayal of Stefano Cucchi in On My Skin (2018), which earned him the David di Donatello Award for Best Actor. He then starred in the international drama Devils (2020), as a high-powered financier alongside Patrick Dempsey, in the David di Donatello winning The Eight Mountains, and in the biographical series Supersex (2024) as Italian adult film actor Rocco Siffredi.

== Career ==
Son of Rossella and Silvano, Borghi began working at the Cinecittà Studios as a stuntman between 2005 and 2007. He then transitioned to minor roles in television dramas.

He made his cinematic debut in 2011 with the film Cinque and later secured co-starring roles in Roma criminale (2013, portraying Marco Lanzi), Suburra (2015, playing Aureliano Adami, known as "Numero 8"), and Non essere cattivo (2015, presented out of competition at the 72nd Venice International Film Festival, where he portrayed Vittorio). For his performance in the latter, he won the Nuovo Imaie Talent Award for Best Italian Newcomer Actor and received a nomination for David di Donatello for Best Actor at the 2016 David di Donatello Awards. In 2015, Francesco Fiumarella, founder of the International "Vincenzo Crocitti" Award, also recognized him as the Best Actor and Revelation of the Year.

In 2016, he appeared as a guest alongside Alessandro Roja in the third episode of Top Gear Italia. In 2017, he portrayed the singer Luigi Tenco in the biographical film Dalida, based on the life of the eponymous singer, and was selected to represent Italy at the Shooting Stars Award, a recognition for promising young European actors presented during the Berlin International Film Festival. Also in 2017, he served as the host for the 74th Venice International Film Festival. In October 2017, he starred in Suburra: Blood on Rome, a Netflix series that serves as a prequel to the 2015 film, reprising his role as Aureliano Adami. The series' second season premiered on February 22, 2019, followed by the third and final season on October 30, 2020.

In 2018, he played the role of Stefano Cucchi in On My Skin by Alessio Cremonini, another Netflix production. His performance earned him the Pasinetti Special Award for the film and its actors, the Brian Award, and the FEDIC Award at the 75th Venice International Film Festival. He also won the David di Donatello for Best Actor for the role. On receiving the award, Borghi stated that the prize "belongs to Stefano Cucchi.". He then starred in the Italian historical epic The First King, produced by Rai Cinema, directed by Matteo Rovere, and co-starring with Alessio Lapice.

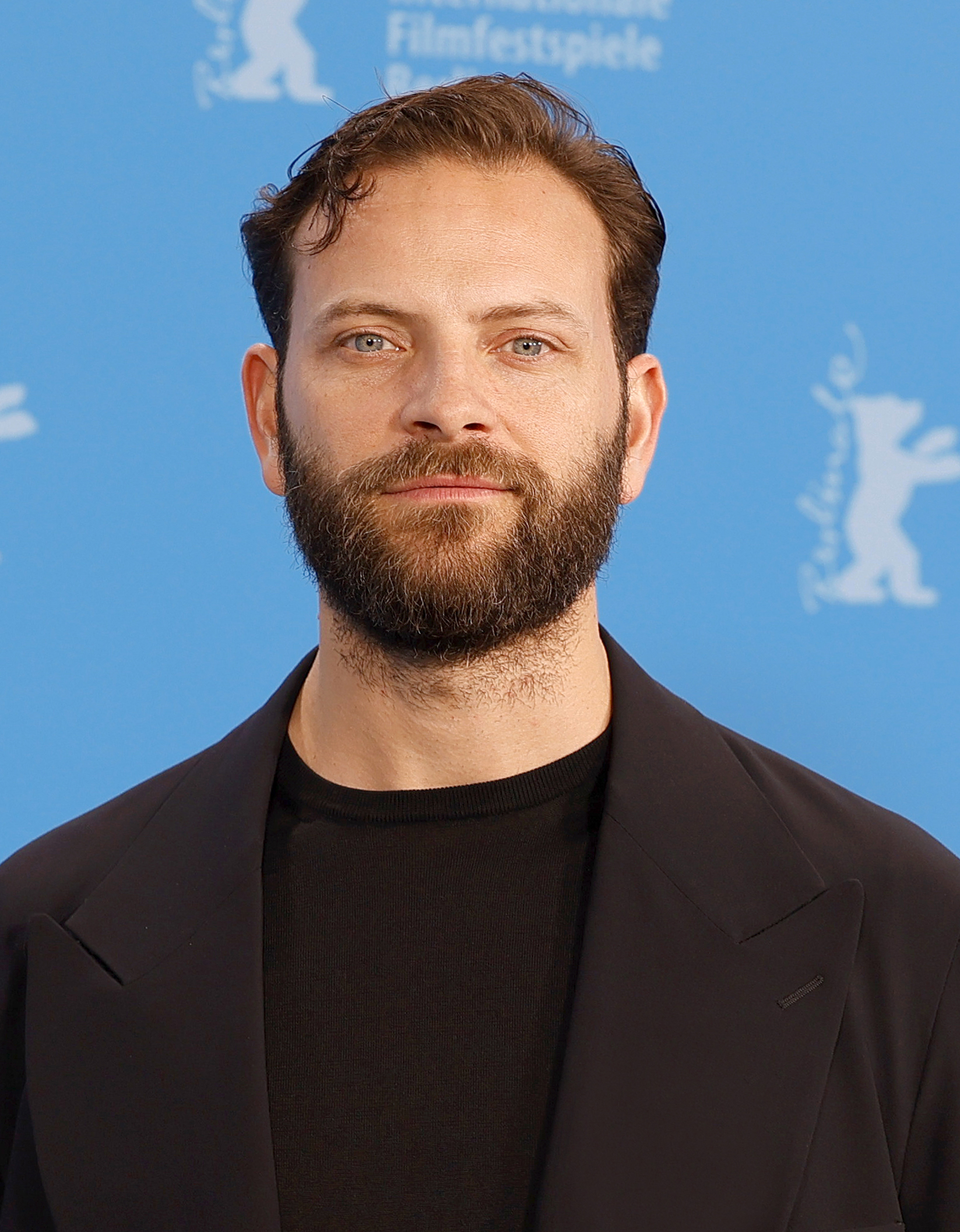
Borghi at the 2024 Berlinale

In 2020, he starred in the international co-production Devils, a television series based on the novel of the same name by Guido Maria Brera and set in the world of high finance in London. Co-produced and broadcast by Sky Atlantic, the series was filmed in English and featured him alongside Patrick Dempsey and Kasia Smutniak. In the Italian version, the actor chose not to dub himself (his lines are dubbed by Andrea Mete).

In 2021, he starred alongside Jasmine Trinca in the film Superheroes. In April 2023, he revealed that he has Tourette syndrome. The following year, he portrayed Rocco Siffredi in Supersex, a Netflix series in which he also served as an associate producer.

== Filmography ==
=== Film ===
Year	Title	Role	Notes
2011	Cinque	Emiliano	
2013	Roma criminale	Marco Lanzi	
2014	Di tutti i colori		
2015	Don't Be Bad	Vittorio	Nominated – David di Donatello for Best Actor
2015	Suburra	Aureliano "Number 8" Adami	Nominated – David di Donatello for Best Supporting Actor
2016	I Was a Dreamer	Boccione	Nastro d'Argento for Best Supporting Actor (also for Lucky)
2016	Ningyo	Man	Short film
2017	Dalida	Luigi Tenco	
2017	Lucky	Chicano	Nastro d'Argento for Best Supporting Actor (also for I Was a Dreamer); Nominated – David di Donatello for Best Supporting Actor
2017	Naples in Veils	Andrea Galderisi / Luca	Nominated – David di Donatello for Best Actor
2017	The Place	Fulvio	
2018	On My Skin	Stefano Cucchi	David di Donatello for Best Actor
2019	The First King: Birth of an Empire	Remus	Nominated – David di Donatello for Best Actor; Nominated – Nastro d'Argento for Best Supporting Actor
2021	Superheroes	Marco	
2021	Mondocane	Testacalda	
2022	The Hanging Sun	John	
2022	The Eight Mountains	Bruno	
2024	Battlefield		
2025	Heads or Tails?	Santino	
2025	The Captive	Hasán Bajá	
2026	No Pain	Davide	

=== Television ===
Year(s)	Title	Role	Notes
2006	Distretto di polizia	Martino Benzi	Episode: "Un gesto disperato"
2007	Io e mamma	Valerio Leccisi	Television miniseries
2008	RIS Delitti Imperfetti	Luciano Orlandi	Episode: "Il mistero del bosco"
2009	Don Matteo	Enrico Mastroianni	Episode: "Numeri primi"
2010	Augustine: The Decline of the Roman Empire	Camillus	Television miniseries
2010	Romanzo criminale - La serie	Marcello	Episode 7
2011	Caccia al Re - La narcotici	Carlo	Episode 1
2011	Rex	Edoardo Rovati	Episode: "Vendetta"
2012–2013	L'isola	Sebastiano	Main role, 8 episodes
2013	Ultimo - L'occhio del falco	Young thug	Television miniseries
2013	Che Dio ci aiuti	Riccardo Manzi	8 episodes
2015	Squadra mobile	Giulio	4 episodes
2015	Non uccidere	Graziano Borghi	Episode 3
2017–2020	Suburra: Blood on Rome	Aureliano "Number 8" Adami	24 episodes
2020–2022	Devils	Massimo Ruggero	18 episodes
2024	Supersex	Rocco Siffredi	Lead role
