= Alice Pagani =

Italian actress (born 1998)

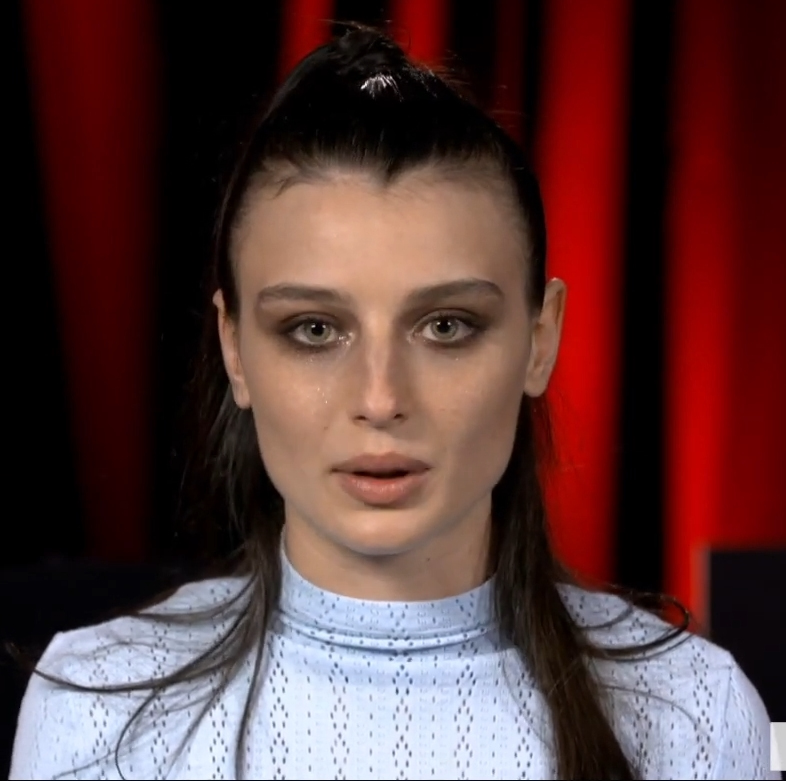
- Pagani in April 2021
- Born: 19 February 1998 (age 28); Ascoli Piceno, Marche, Italy
- Education: London School of Dramatic Art
- Occupations: Actress; model; author
- Years active: 2017–present

Alice Pagani (born 19 February 1998) is an Italian actress, model, and author. She is best known for playing Ludovica Storti in the Netflix series Baby (2018–2020) and Stella in the Paolo Sorrentino film Loro.

In 2020, she fronted Emporio Armani's Together Stronger campaign with Nicholas Hoult. In 2021, her first novel, the autobiographical coming-of-age story Ophelia, was published by Mondadori Electa.

== Early life ==
Pagani is from Ascoli Piceno, a town in the Marche region of central Italy. Her parents were factory workers, and are divorced. As a child, she was hospitalized for Henoch–Schönlein purpura, and temporarily used a wheelchair due to immobility. She became interested in modeling after taking pictures of her freckles with a camera that her father gave her to pass the time while recovering. Pagani also posed for photographers after being approached in public. Pagani has dyslexia.

She graduated from the London School of Dramatic Art with an Advanced Diploma in Acting in 2023.

== Personal life ==
From 2018 to 2021, she was in a relationship with rapper Pyrex, a member of Dark Polo Gang. The two also bought a house in Milan.

In 2021, she appeared on the cover of the Italian edition of Vanity Fair to help express support for a bill that bans discrimination and hate crimes against women, gay and transgender people.

== Filmography ==
=== Film ===
Year	Title	Role	Notes
2017	Il permesso - 48 ore fuori	Ludmila	
2017	Siamo la fine del mondo	Giulia	Short film
2017	Classe Z	Viola Chiaretti	
2018	Loro	Stella	
2018	Ricordi?	Benedetta	
2019	The Poison Rose	Violet Gregory	Scenes deleted
2020	The Croods: A New Age	Eep	Italian dub
2021	Don't Kill Me	Mirta	
2025	DRAGN	Zoja Mangano	

=== Television ===
Year	Title	Role	Notes
2018–2020	Baby	Ludovica Storti	Main role
