= Superheroes (film) =

- Theatrical release poster
- Italian: Supereroi
- Directed by: Paolo Genovese
- Written by: Paolo Costella; Paolo Genovese; Rolando Ravello
- Produced by: Marco Belardi
- Starring: Alessandro Borghi; Jasmine Trinca
- Cinematography: Fabrizio Lucci
- Edited by: Consuelo Catucci
- Music by: Maurizio Filardo
- Release date: 23 December 2021
- Running time: 120 minutes
- Country: Italy
- Language: Italian

Superheroes (Italian: Supereroi) is a 2021 Italian romantic comedy-drama film directed by Paolo Genovese, starring Alessandro Borghi and Jasmine Trinca.

== Plot ==
The main characters are Anna, an impulsive and creative comic book artist, and Marco, a rational physics professor. Their chance meeting in the rain becomes the beginning of a long-term relationship, full of quarrels and reconciliations, disagreements and mutual attraction. Anna resists serious commitments for a long time, while Marco, on the contrary, often shows pragmatism and prudence. Over time, the couple faces everyday difficulties, jealousy, fears and insecurities, but also experiences joy and happiness, including the birth of a child.

The film focuses on the trials that love and relationships undergo, as well as the ability to compromise and support each other in difficult times. The plot unfolds over about 20 years, showing how the characters and their feelings change during this time. Despite the difficulties, their love turns out to be a real superpower.

== Cast ==
- Alessandro Borghi as Marco
- Jasmine Trinca as Anna
- Vinicio Marchioni as Vittorio
- Greta Scarano as Pilar
- Angelica Leo as Sofia
- Linda Caridi as Tullia
- Gwendolyn Gourvenec as Laurene
- Elena Sofia Ricci as Elena
- Beppe Severgnini as the publisher
- Flavio Parenti as Gigi
- Giacomo Mattia as Ugo
- Ermanno Casari as Prof. Fioroni
- Alberto Paradossi as Walter
- Camilla Lehmann as Carolyne
