= The Goddess of Fortune =

2019 Italian comedy-drama film

- Film poster
- Italian: La dea fortuna
- Directed by: Ferzan Özpetek
- Written by: Gianni Romoli; Silvia Ranfagni; Ferzan Özpetek
- Produced by: Tilde Corsi; Gianni Romoli
- Starring: Stefano Accorsi; Edoardo Leo; Jasmine Trinca
- Cinematography: Gian Filippo Corticelli
- Edited by: Pietro Morana
- Music by: Pasquale Catalano
- Distributed by: Warner Bros. Pictures
- Release date: 19 December 2019
- Running time: 118 minutes
- Country: Italy
- Language: Italian

The Goddess of Fortune (Italian: La dea fortuna) is a 2019 Italian romantic comedy-drama film directed by Ferzan Özpetek.

== Summary ==
Alessandro and Arturo have been a couple for more than fifteen years. Although passion and love have turned into an important affection, their relationship has been in crisis for some time. The sudden arrival in their lives of two children left in custody for a few days by Alessandro's best friend, however, could give an unexpected turn to their tired routine. The solution will be a crazy gesture. But on the other hand, love is a state of pleasant madness.

== Cast ==
- Stefano Accorsi as Arturo
- Jasmine Trinca as Annamaria Muscarà
- Edoardo Leo as Alessandro Marchetti
- Serra Yilmaz as Esra
- Barbara Alberti as Elena Muscarà
- Sara Ciocca as Martina Muscarà
- Edoardo Brandi as Alessandro Muscarà
- Pia Lanciotti as Ginevra
- Cristina Bugatty as Mina
- Filippo Nigro as Filippo
- Dora Romano as Lea
- Barbara Chichiarelli as the nurse
- Loredana Cannata as Melina
- Carmine Recano as the doctor
- Edoardo Purgatori as Marco
- Matteo Martari as Michele
