= Adelina Tattilo =

Italian publisher (1928–2007)

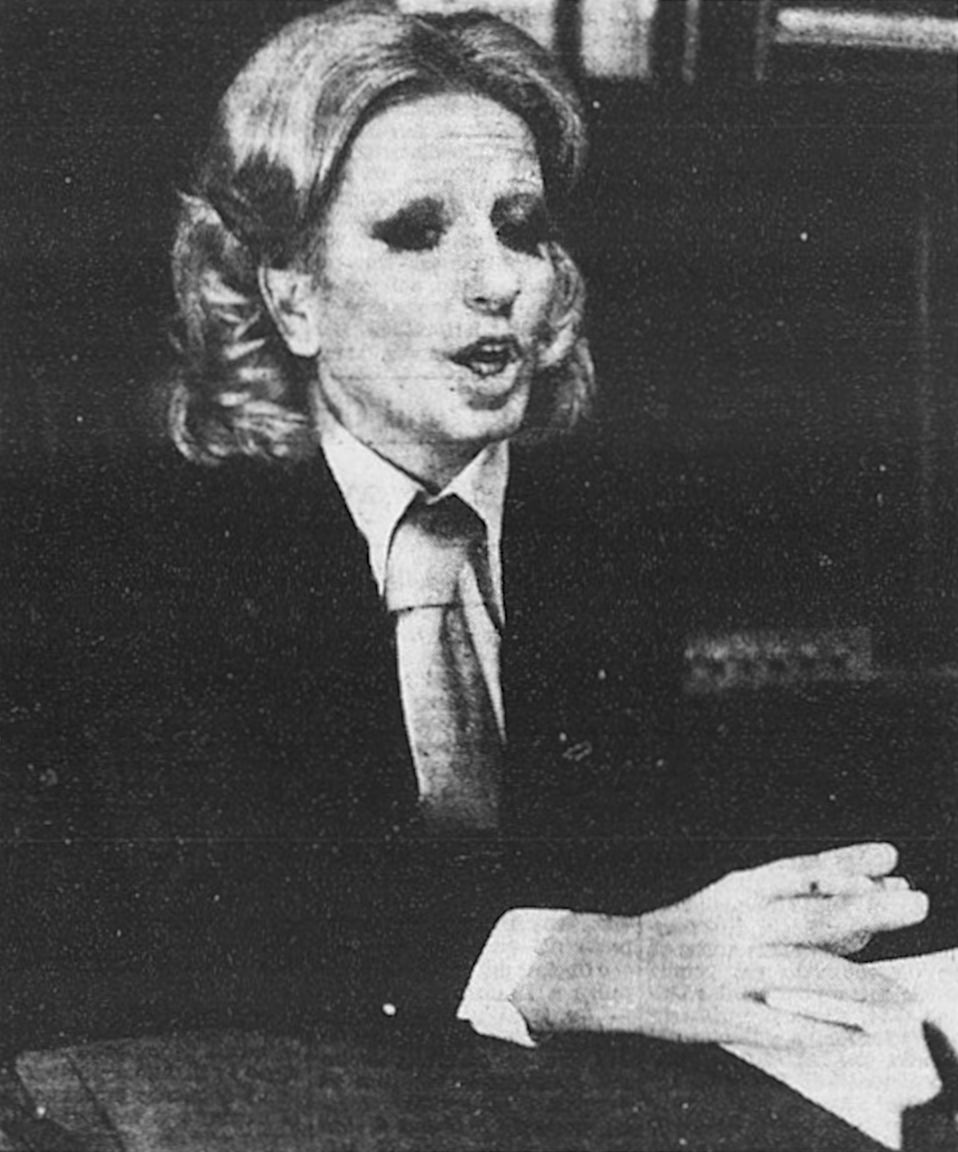
- Tattilo in 1971
- Born: 13 November 1928; Manfredonia, Apulia, Italy
- Died: 1 February 2007 (aged 78); Rome, Italy
- Occupation: Publisher
- Known for: Playmen
- Spouse: Saro Balsamo (divorced)
- Children: 3

Adelina Tattilo (November 13, 1928 – February 1, 2007) was an Italian publisher, journalist, film producer, and pioneer in Italy's erotic magazine industry. Tattilo and her magazine, Playmen, provoked debates about sexual attitudes and censorship in Italy.

== Early life ==
Adelina Tattilo was born in Manfredonia, Apulia. She was educated at schools managed by nuns in Ivrea, Turin.

== Career ==
In the 1960s, Tattilo launched Menelik, a weekly magazine of erotic comic strips, featuring the character Bernarda. This periodical sold up to 100,000 copies each week.

In 1965, Tattilo and her husband, Saro Balsamo, launched Big, a weekly magazine that targeted teenage boys and explored topics of sexual curiosity. Big reached sales approaching 400,000 per week. In 1966, they started Men, a weekly collection of photographs of nude women purchased from Scandinavia or provided by Italian modeling agencies.

In 1967, they founded Playmen, which was banned in Italy. Tattilo reported that Playmen cost $640,000 USD to launch in 1967, and that by 1971 it had risen to an estimated net worth of $1,600,000 USD.

Tattilo personally oversaw editorial decisions at Playmen, including the selection of cover girl models. She published controversial clandestine paparazzi photographs, including Brigitte Bardot sunbathing topless and Jackie Kennedy Onassis swimming nude.

In the early 1970s, Tattilo's publishing house entered the market with a series of books, including Dizionario della Letteratura Erotica (Dictionary of Erotic Literature), La Marijuana Fa Bene (Marijuana Does You Good), and Playdux: Storia Erotica del Fascismo (1973), an erotic history of fascism.

== Personal life ==
Tattilo married Saro Balsamo, with whom she worked. They later separated. Tattilo had three children.

In the 1960s and 1970s, Tattilo campaigned for radical libertarian socialist attitudes in Italy and cultivated a friendship with socialist politician Bettino Craxi.

In November 2025, Netflix released Mrs Playmen, a seven-episode series inspired by Tattilo. It portrays her success as the publisher of the Italian erotic magazine Playmen, along with insights into her personal life and her betrayal by her husband.

== Death ==
Tattilo died in Rome on February 1, 2007 at the age of 78, following a brief illness.
