= Marcel! =

2022 film by Jasmine Trinca

- Italian theatrical release poster
- Directed by: Jasmine Trinca
- Written by: Jasmine Trinca; Francesca Manieri
- Starring: Alba Rohrwacher; Maayane Conti; Giovanna Ralli; Valentina Cervi; Umberto Orsini
- Cinematography: Daria D'Antonio
- Edited by: Chiara Russo
- Music by: Matti Bye
- Production companies: Cinema Undici; Rai Cinema; Totem Atelier
- Distributed by: Rezo Films
- Release dates: 21 May 2022 (Cannes); 1 June 2022 (Italy)
- Running time: 93 minutes
- Countries: France; Italy
- Language: Italian

Marcel! is a 2022 drama film directed by Jasmine Trinca who co-wrote the screenplay with Francesca Manieri. Starring Alba Rohrwacher, Maayane Conti, and Giovanna Ralli, it is the director's feature debut and premiered at the Cannes Film Festival.

== Synopsis ==
The film portrays a troubled relationship between a street artist mother (Alba Rohrwacher) and her saxophone-playing daughter (Maayane Conti) who competes with the mother's dog Marcel for affection. It is Marcel (the only character in the film to have a name) who takes part in the mother's performances, while the daughter is not allowed to. When Marcel has an accident, the daughter comforts her distraught mother and the two set off on a trip in preparation for a street art festival, staying with a cousin on the way. Rohrwacher and Conti had played the roles of mother and daughter in Trinca's 2020 short film Being my Mom before reuniting for Marcel, the director's first feature film.

In the words of the director: "Marcel! doesn’t necessarily tell the truth, but focuses on portraying credibility; a place where things happen but more so, a world of projections where love is the core of it all. It is an attempt to rewrite a motherdaughter relationship where cruelty and care coexist, and it is shared by two women who are growing up."

== Cast ==
- Alba Rohrwacher as the mother
- Maayane Conti as the daughter
- Valentina Cervi as the cousin
- Giovanna Ralli as the grandmother
- Umberto Orsini as the grandfather
- Giuseppe Cederna as the elegant friend
- Dario Cantarelli as the suitor
- Valeria Golino as the psychoanalyst

== Release ==
The film premiered at the Cannes Film Festival on 21 May 2022.

== Reception ==
On the review aggregator website Rotten Tomatoes, the film holds 4 out of 4 "Fresh" (that is, generally favourable) ratings.

In a review for Screen International, Jonathan Holland described the film as a "delicate, well-observed homage to mime, to silent film, and to Rome in summertime" that "carefully and lovingly blends different tropes into a distinctive and often engaging part-real, part-fantasy world".

== Awards ==
Award	Category	Recipient/Nominee	Result
Davide di Donatello Awards	Best New Director	Jasmine Trinca	Nominated
Italian National Syndicate of Film Journalists	Best New Director	Jasmine Trinca	Nominated
Italian National Syndicate of Film Journalists	Best Costume Design	Marta Passarini	Nominated
Raindance Film Festival	Best Debut Feature	Jasmine Trinca	Nominated
Raindance Film Festival	Best Director	Jasmine Trinca	Nominated
Silk Road International Film Festival	Best Film	Jasmine Trinca	Nominated
Silk Road International Film Festival	Best New Director	Jasmine Trinca	Nominated

The lead animal actor, Marcel, shared the Grand Jury Prize during the Palm Dog Award ceremony at the 2022 Cannes Film Festival.
