= Suburræterna =

Italian crime drama television series

- Genre: Crime drama; Thriller; Neo-noir
- Based on: Suburra
- Written by: Ezio Abbate; Fabrizio Bettelli; Andrea Nobile; Camilla Buizza; Marco Sani; Giulia Forgione
- Directed by: Ciro D'Emilio; Alessandro Tonda
- Starring: Giacomo Ferrara; Filippo Nigro; Carlotta Antonelli; Federica Sabatini; Emmanuele Aita; Paola Sotgiu
- Composer: Ariel Lerner
- Country of origin: Italy
- Original languages: Italian and Romanesco
- No. of seasons: 1
- No. of episodes: 8

Production
- Executive producers: Marco Chimenz; Matteo De Laurentiis; Gina Gardini; Giovanni Stabilini; Riccardo Tozzi
- Cinematography: Giovanni Canevari; Salvatore Landi
- Editor: Mattia Montanari
- Running time: 40–49 minutes
- Production company: Cattleya

Original release
- Network: Rome Film Festival
- Release: 28 October 2023
- Network: Netflix
- Release: 14 November 2023

Related
- Suburra; Suburra: Blood on Rome

Suburræterna is an Italian television series based on the 2015 neo-noir film Suburra and following the events of the 2017 crime drama series Suburra: Blood on Rome. It premiered at the 18th Rome Film Festival on 28 October 2023 and was released on Netflix on 14 November 2023.

== Premise ==
Spadino returns to Rome amid chaos and turmoil to retake control of the city.

== Cast ==
- Giacomo Ferrara as Alberto "Spadino" Anacleti
- Filippo Nigro as Amedeo Cinaglia
- Carlotta Antonelli as Angelica Sale
- Federica Sabatini as Nadia Gravoni
- Emmanuele Aita as Ferdinando Badali
- Paola Sotgiu as Adelaide Anacleti
- Marlon Joubert as Damiano Luciani
- Aliosha Massine as Ercole Bonatesta
- Federigo Ceci as Armando Tronto
- Alberto Cracco as Cardinale Nascari
- Giorgia Spinelli as Miriana Murras
- Yamina Birmi as Giulia Luciani
- Morris Sarra as Cesare Damiani
- Gabriele Di Stadio as Victor Anacleti
- Alberto Testone as Bonatesta's grandfather

== Episodes ==
No.	Title	Duration	Original release date
1	"Cages" (Gabbie)	49 min	14 November 2023
2	"Anabasis" (Anabasi)	47 min	14 November 2023
3	"Shoreline Inferno" (Tintarella di luna)	47 min	14 November 2023
4	"Under Siege" (Assedio)	43 min	14 November 2023
5	"Underground" (Sottoterra)	45 min	14 November 2023
6	"Hoo-ha" (Caciara)	47 min	14 November 2023
7	"Knives" (Coltelli)	40 min	14 November 2023
8	"Ablaze" (Brucia)	41 min	14 November 2023

== Production ==
Filming began in October 2022 in Rome.

== Release ==
A teaser trailer for the series was released on 19 September 2023. The official trailer was released on 25 October 2023.

The series premiered at the 18th Rome Film Festival on 28 October 2023. It was later released on Netflix on 14 November 2023.
