= Suburra: Blood on Rome =

Italian crime drama television series

- Italian: Suburra - La serie
- Genre: Crime drama; Serial drama; Thriller; Noir
- Based on: Suburra by Giancarlo De Cataldo and Carlo Bonini; Suburra by Stefano Sollima
- Developed by: Daniele Cesarano; Barbara Petronio; Ezio Abbate; Fabrizio Bettelli
- Starring: Alessandro Borghi; Giacomo Ferrara; Eduardo Valdarnini; Francesco Acquaroli; Filippo Nigro; Claudia Gerini; (See full cast list)
- Composers: Scott Morgan; Piotta
- Country of origin: Italy
- Original languages: Italian; Sinti
- No. of seasons: 3
- No. of episodes: 24 (list of episodes)

Production
- Executive producers: Matteo De Laurentiis; Erik Barmack; Kelly Luegenbiehl; Jennifer Breslow; Sandra Bonacchi
- Producers: Giovanni Stabilini; Marco Chimenz; Riccardo Tozzi; Gina Gardini; Sara Polese; Filippo Rizzello
- Production location: Rome, Italy
- Cinematography: Arnaldo Catinari; Fabrizio Vicari
- Editors: Patrizio Marone; Lorenzo Peluso
- Running time: 42–53 minutes
- Production companies: Cattleya; Rai Fiction; Bartleby Film

Original release
- Network: Netflix
- Release: 6 October 2017 – 30 October 2020

Related
- Suburra; Suburræterna

Suburra: Blood on Rome (Italian: Suburra - La serie) is an Italian crime drama television series set in Rome. It is based on the 2015 film Suburra, in turn inspired by the novel of the same name by Giancarlo De Cataldo and Carlo Bonini. The series was initially released and intended as a prequel to the 2015 film during its first two seasons, but it changed direction in its final season, following Rai Fiction’s departure from the project, to become a separate, divergent adaptation. The series was developed by Daniele Cesarano, Barbara Petronio, Ezio Abbate and Fabrizio Bettelli for Netflix, making it its first Italian-language original television series. The show premiered on 6 October 2017 and ran for three seasons totaling 24 episodes until 30 October 2020. It was produced by Cattleya in association with Rai Fiction and Bartleby Film. Rai Fiction was not involved in the production of the third and final season.

Suburra draws from the real life events of the Mafia Capitale investigation and focuses on power clashes and corruption among organized crime, politicians and churchmen. The series revolves around Aureliano Adami (Alessandro Borghi), an Ostia-based gang member, and his relations with Alberto "Spadino" Anacleti (Giacomo Ferrara), a Sinti gang member, and Gabriele "Lele" Marchilli (Eduardo Valdarnini), the only son of a policeman who becomes involved in crime. Samurai (Francesco Acquaroli), an antagonist to Adami, is the head of Roman organized crime and contact for the Sicilian Mafia in Rome; he approaches politician Amedeo Cinaglia (Filippo Nigro) to aid in his Ostia affairs. Sara Monaschi (Claudia Gerini) is a Vatican financial auditor for lands in Ostia.

The world premiere of the series was on 1 September 2017 at the 74th Venice Film Festival, where the first two episodes were screened as part of the Il Cinema nel Giardino section. All episodes of the first season premiered worldwide on 6 October 2017. The series was also set to air on the Italian television network Rai 2 in 2018, but its premiere was postponed to 15 February 2019. On 30 January 2018, the series was renewed for a second season, whose production began on 3 April 2018 and ended on 8 August 2018. The eight-episode second season was released on 22 February 2019. On 2 April 2019, Netflix announced the renewal for a third season. On 4 December 2019, Netflix announced that the series' third season would be its last. The season was released on 30 October 2020.

A second television spinoff of the film, titled Suburræterna, was released on 14 November 2023.

== Cast and characters ==
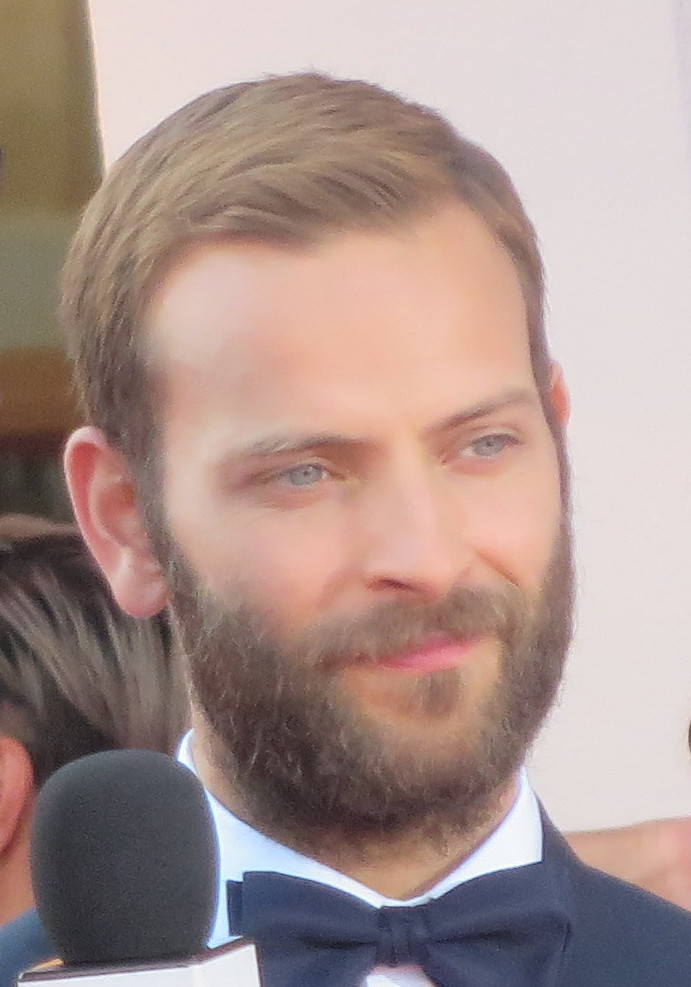
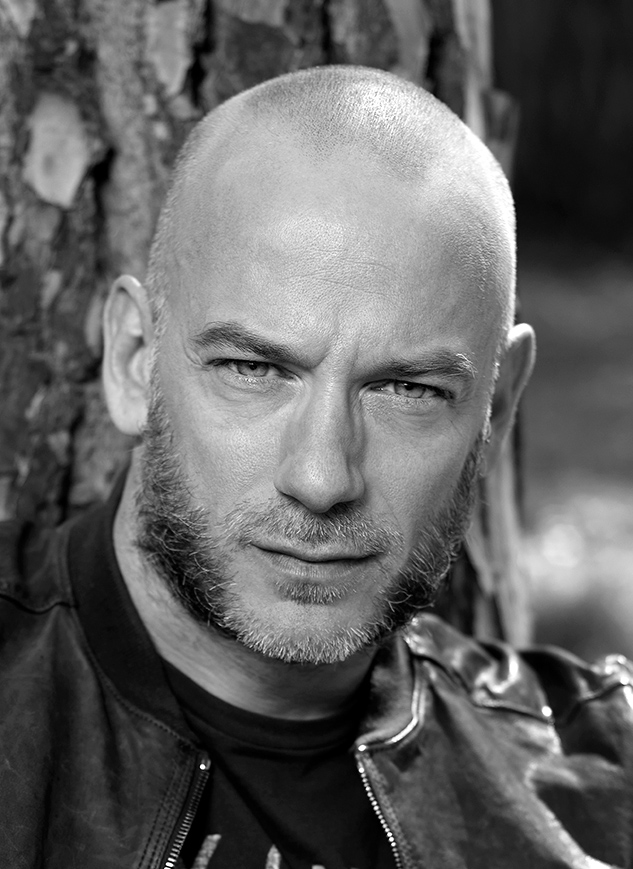
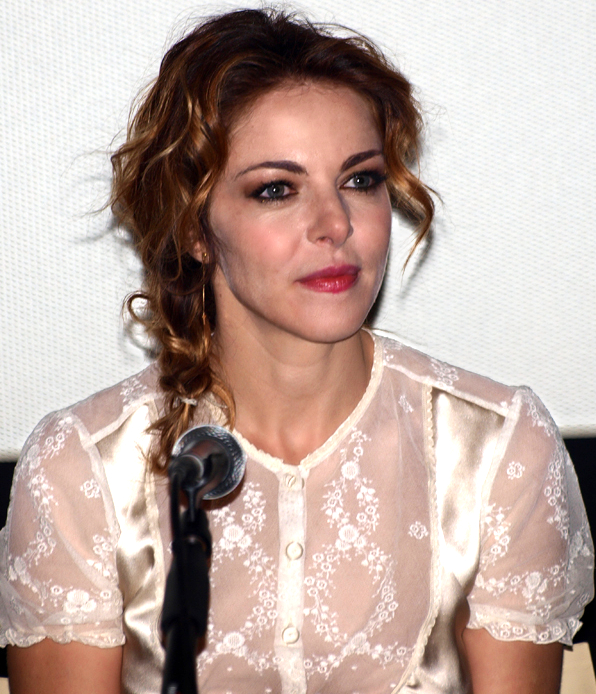
Alessandro Borghi, Filippo Nigro and Claudia Gerini (left to right) portray Aureliano Adami, Amedeo Cinaglia and Sara Monaschi respectively.

=== Main ===
- Alessandro Borghi as Aureliano Adami, an Ostia-based gang member. Gabriele Rizzoli portrays young Aureliano in season two.
- Giacomo Ferrara as Alberto "Spadino" Anacleti, a Sinti gang member and closeted homosexual. Nicholas Salvatori portrays young Alberto in seasons two and three.
- Eduardo Valdarnini as Gabriele "Lele" Marchilli (seasons 1–2), the only son of a policeman who becomes involved in crime due to a debt with Samurai; he later joins the police-force himself. Lorenzo Ciamei portrays young Gabriele in season two.
- Francesco Acquaroli as "Samurai", the head of organized crime in Rome and contact for the Sicilian Mafia; he is also a former militant neo-fascist terrorist. His real name is Valerio. Rocco Angelucci portrays young Valerio in season three.
- Filippo Nigro as Amedeo Cinaglia, a progressive politician approached by Samurai. Alessandro Sposi portrays young Amedeo in season three.
- Claudia Gerini as Sara Monaschi, (Note: Gerini only appears in one episode of season three, although credited as a main cast member.) a financial auditor working for the Roman Curia
- Adamo Dionisi as Manfredi Anacleti, a Sinti crime gang leader and Spadino's older brother. Antonio Orlando portrays young Manfredi in season three.
- Barbara Chichiarelli as Livia Adami (seasons 1–2), Aureliano's sister
- Federico Tocci as Tullio Adami (season 1, guest season 2), Aureliano's father
- Gerasimos Skiadaresis as Monsignor Theodosiou (season 1), a pious yet sinful monsignor
- Elisabetta De Palo as Countess Sveva della Rocca Croce (seasons 1–2), a powerful aristocrat
- Carlotta Antonelli as Angelica Sale, Spadino's wife
- Renato Marchetti as Franco Marchilli (seasons 1–2), (Note: Marchetti only appears in one episode of season two, although credited as a main cast member.) a policeman and Lele's father
- Paola Sotgiu as Adelaide Anacleti, Manfredi and Spadino's mother
- Augusto Zucchi as Cardinal Cosimo Giunti (seasons 1–2), a member of the Vatican commission
- Stefano Santospago as Sandro Monaschi (seasons 1–2), (Note: Santospago only appears in one episode of season two, although credited as a main cast member.) Sara's husband
- Lucia Mascino as Gabriella (seasons 1–2), a member of parliament and Amedeo's ex-wife
- Lorena Cesarini as Isabelle Mbamba (season 1), a prostitute and Aureliano's love interest
- Diego Ribon as Stefano Forsini (seasons 1–2), (Note: Ribon only appears in one episode of season two, although credited as a main cast member.) a member of parliament and Gabriella's new husband
- Pietro Ragusa as Gianni Taccon (season 1), a new member of Amedeo's municipal commission
- Jacopo Venturiero as Adriano Latelli (seasons 2–3), (Note: Venturiero only appears in one episode of season three, although credited as a main cast member.) a clandestine neo-fascist radio host
- Rosa Diletta Rossi as Alice (seasons 2–3, recurring season 1), Amedeo's second wife
- Federica Sabatini as Nadia Gravoni (seasons 2–3), the daughter of a small boss of Ostia who establishes a personal and business relationship with Aureliano
- Cristina Pelliccia as Cristiana Massoli (season 2), a policewoman and Lele's colleague
- Alessandro Bernardini as Saverio "Boiardo" Guerri (seasons 2–3, recurring season 1), Samurai's right-hand man
- Stefano Fabrizi as Romolo Lucci (season 2, recurring season 1), a soldier of the Adamis
- Alessandro Proietti as Alex (seasons 2–3), Spadino's cousin, loyal to Adelaide
- Alberto Cracco as Cardinal Fiorenzo Nascari (seasons 2–3)
- Fiorenza Tessari as Mara Guagli (season 2, recurring season 1), a policewoman and Lele's father's love interest
- Antonio Bannò as Flavio Lucci (season 3, recurring season 2), Romolo's son
- Marzia Ubaldi as Sibilla Mancini (season 3)
- Emmanuele Aita as Ferdinando Badali (season 3, recurring seasons 1–2), a member of the Sicilian Mafia
- Alessandra Roca as Laura, Manfredi's lawyer (season 3)
- Claudio Vanni as Titto Zaccardelli, a drug dealer from North Rome (season 3)

=== Recurring ===
- Pietro Biondi as Cardinal Pascagni, Sara's ally in the Vatican (recurring season 1, guest season 2)
- Alessio De Persio as Vincenzo Sale, a Sinti boss and Angelica's father
- Daniele Amendola as Aldo (season 1), one of Manfredi's soldiers
- Maurizio Bianucci as Aristide Gramini (season 1), a municipal councillor
- Andrea Cavatorta as Serri (season 1), a municipal councillor
- Paolo Gattini as Gianni (season 1)
- Daniele Locci as Boris (season 1), Manfredi and Alberto's cousin
- Alessandro Rossi as Giacomo Finucci (season 1), a corrupt member of Amedeo's municipal commission
- Mario Sgueglia as Ezio Quirino (season 1), an accountant to the Adami family and Livia's love interest
- Aleph Viola as Teo (season 2), Spadino's secret lover
- Gianluca Gobbi as Enrico Barsacci, a right-wing politician (season 2)
- Davide Argenti as Leo, Spadino and Alex's cousin (season 3)
- Sofia Ciraolo as Vittoria Cinaglia, Amedeo and Alice's daughter (season 3)
- Filippo Franzè as Fabrizio Cinaglia, Amedeo and Alice's son (season 3)
- Michael Moses Dodi as Vincent, a priest, Cardinal Nascari's assistant and secret son (season 3)
- Giovanni Federico as Don Badali, a boss of the Sicilian Mafia and Ferdinando's father (recurring season 3, guest season 2)

== Episodes ==
Season	Episodes	Originally released
1	10	6 October 2017
2	8	22 February 2019
3	6	30 October 2020

=== Season 1 (2017) ===
The series follows the story of some characters, including politicians, criminals and ordinary people, involved in the criminal affairs of the city of Rome, against the background of the awarding of contracts for the construction of the tourist port of Rome in the Ostia district. In February 2008, following the announcement of the resignation by the mayor of Rome, Samurai, criminal boss of the Roman underworld, has only 21 days to conclude the purchase of some land on the Ostia seafront, part owned by the Vatican and part owned by the Adami family, and have it approved by the commission to the building industry. The contract for the construction of the tourist port is in the sights of the mafias of southern Italy, strategic for drug trafficking, the main activity of the Adami and Anacleti families.

Aureliano Adami lives with his father Tullio, who cannot stand it, and with his sister Livia, and dreams of building a chalet on the land in Ostia belonging to his mother, who died many years earlier. The Adami family strongly opposes Aureliano's project; in fact, both Livia and her father do not inform Aureliano of the plan to cede the land to Samurai. The other main character, Spadino, belongs to the Anacleti family, of Sinti ethnicity, dedicated to loan sharking and to a lesser extent drug dealing, but is disinterested in the criminal activities organized by his community and does not accept the role attributed to him by his brother Manfredi and his mother, who arranged a marriage for him with the daughter of the patriarch of another important Sinti family. Spadino is homosexual but keeps this hidden from his family. The Anacleti family and the Adami family are adversaries for the control of criminal activities in the Ostia area, historically under the control of the Adami family as regards drug trafficking.

Gabriele "Lele" Marchilli, the third protagonist, the son of a policeman, dreamt of a future for himself as a police officer. He lives with his father, but unbeknownst to him, he juggles university and the dealing of narcotics, supplying wealthy parties in Rome, during which political, clerical and criminal personalities usually participate. He is used as a pawn by Samurai for his interests. Sara Monaschi is an unscrupulous auditor who works in the Vatican, and together with her husband, manages a company interested in the lands of Ostia, targeted by Samurai. Amedeo Cinaglia is a politician, municipal councillor of the municipality of Rome, honest and idealistic, he strongly feels the sense of duty towards the voter but is full of resentment against the party in which he feels not represented, indeed, undervalued despite his work in the committee and his integrity. He lives an internal conflict related to his morals, but will be forced to compromise with Samurai to achieve his goals. Both Sara Monaschi and Amedeo Cinaglia are reluctantly involved in the Ostia land deal, the first as an antagonist of the Samurai, the other as a pawn.

=== Season 2 (2019) ===
The events take place three months after the end of the first season, in the 15 days before the election of the new mayor of Rome, from 14 to 22/23 June 2008. These are crucial days for the future of the capital. Precisely because of this deadline with a high social impact, the battle between corrupt politicians, the Church and organised crime becomes even more intense. The power over the city of Rome is at the centre of the dynamics of the second season, which, therefore, broadens its "range of action" compared to the first, which revolves around the Vatican and the grounds of Ostia. The competition for power is fierce and the characters are increasingly eager to obtain it. In the race to gain fame and respect in the capital, the protagonists of the first season participate who, however, have changed.

=== Season 3 (2020) ===
The events take place a few days after Lele's suicide and Manfredi's awakening from a coma, now in intensive care and under house arrest. Now Aureliano and Spadino intend to avenge Lele and all the victims of Samurai. After taking revenge, they try to come to an agreement with Cinaglia. Cinaglia has in mind to involve them on the occasion of the Extraordinary Jubilee announced by the Pope, in Africa. The new goal of the two is now also the management of the affairs of Northern Rome, proclaiming themselves as "the new Kings of Rome".

== Reception ==
Season 1 received a 100% approval rating on review aggregator Rotten Tomatoes with an average rating of 8.0/10. Hanh Nguyen of IndieWire called it "Netflix's Italian Answer to Narcos", and praised the series for its soundtrack and filming.

Suburra: Blood on Rome is noted for being the first Italian television series to feature a Sinti mobster character who is gay (Spadino Anacleti).
