= Filippo Nigro =

Italian actor

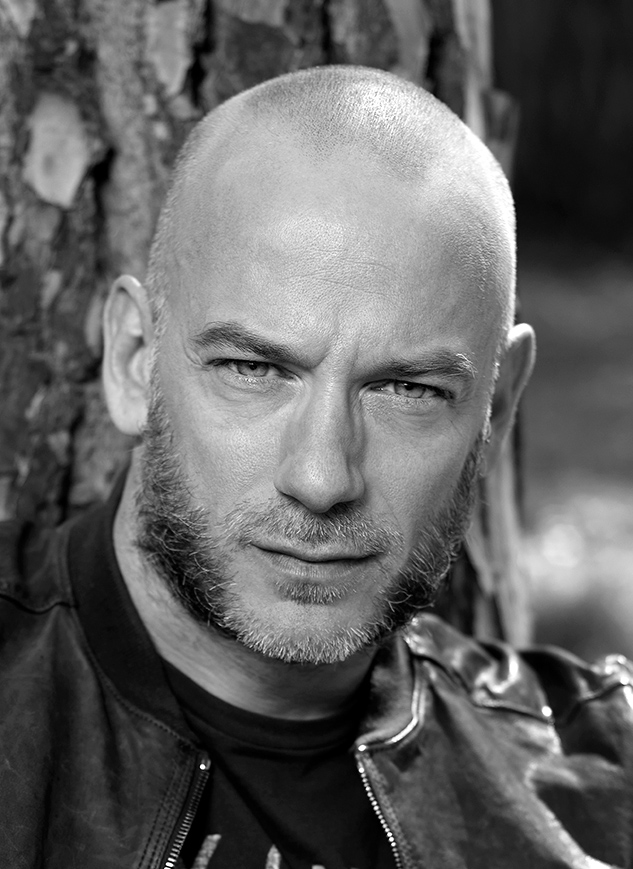
- Born: 3 December 1970 (age 55); Rome
- Occupation: Actor

Filippo Nigro (born 3 December 1970) is an Italian actor.

== Life and career ==
Born in Rome, Nigro studied at the Centro Sperimentale di Cinematografia under Lina Wertmüller. After a minor role in the 2001 Ferzan Ozpetek's drama film The Ignorant Fairies and several television works, in 2003 Nigro had his breakout role as Filippo, the Giovanna Mezzogiorno's husband in Ozpetek's Facing Windows. In 2004 he was appointed Shooting Star at the Berlin International Film Festival. In 2009 he was nominated at David di Donatello for Best Supporting Actor for his performance in Different from Whom?.

Nigro is married to film and television producer Gina Gardini. They have three children.

== Filmography ==
=== Films ===
| Year | Title | Role | Notes |
|---|---|---|---|
| 1998 | Donne in bianco | Daniele | |
| 2001 | The Ignorant Fairies | Riccardo | |
| 2003 | Facing Windows | Filippo | |
| 2004 | A luci spente | Andrea Gualtieri | |
| 2007 | Ho voglia di te | Marcantonio | |
| 2008 | Love, Soccer and Other Catastrophes | Emanuele De Angelis | |
| 2008 | A Game for Girls | Mario Landi | |
| 2008 | Amore che vieni, amore che vai | Salvatore | |
| 2009 | Different from Whom? | Remo | |
| 2009 | Oggi sposi | Fabio Di Caio | |
| 2010 | From the Waist Up | Danilo | |
| 2012 | They Call It Summer | The Swinger | |
| 2012 | ACAB | Negro | |
| 2015 | Deep in the Wood | Manuel Conci | |
| 2019 | The Goddess of Fortune | Filippo | |
| 2020 | The Book of Vision | Gen. von Ouerbach | |
| 2021 | Per tutta la vita | Andrea | |
| 2022 | The Boat | Flavio | |

=== Television ===
| Year | Title | Role | Notes |
|---|---|---|---|
| 1996 | I ragazzi del muretto | Ivan | Episode: "Categorie a rischio" |
| 1996 | Un posto al sole | Marco Spada | 25 episodes |
| 1997–1998 | Doctor Giorgia | Paolo | Main role (seasons 1-2) |
| 1998 | Il maresciallo Rocca | Angelo Fazzi | Episode: "Senza perché" |
| 2002 | L'ultimo rigore | Ruben | Television film |
| 2005–2007 | RIS: Delitti imperfetti | Fabio Martinelli | Main role (seasons 1-2); guest (season 3) |
| 2009 | Tutta la verità | Marco D'Elia | Television film |
| 2012 | Barabbas | Pontius Pilate | Television film |
| 2016 | Romanzo siciliano | Chief Ettore Neri | Main role |
| 2017 | Amore pensaci tu | Marco Pellegrini | Main role |
| 2017–2020 | Suburra: Blood on Rome | Amedeo Cinaglia | Main role |
| 2018 | Medici | Luca Soderini | Main role (season 2) |
| 2022 | Everything Calls for Salvation | Dr. Mancino | 2 episodes |
| 2023 | Suburræterna | Amedeo Cinaglia | Main role |
| 2024 | Citadel: Diana | Gabriele | Main role |
| 2025 | Mrs Playmen | Chartroux | Main role |

=== Music videos ===
| Year | Title | Artist(s) | Notes |
|---|---|---|---|
| 2003 | "Gocce di memoria" | Giorgia | |
| 2008 | "Ci parliamo da grandi" | Eros Ramazzotti | |
| 2011 | "Le tasche piene di sassi" | Jovanotti | |
