= Playmen =

Italian pornographic magazine

- September 1974 cover depicting Camille Keaton
- Founder: Adelina Tattilo
- Categories: Men's magazines
- Frequency: Monthly
- Publisher: Tattilo Editrice S.p.A.
- Total circulation: 450,000 (1971)
- Founded: 1967; 59 years ago
- Final issue: 2001; 25 years ago
- Country: Italy
- Language: Italian
- Website: www.playmen.it

Playmen (stylised in all caps) was an Italian monthly softcore pornographic magazine that covered sex, society, culture, fashion, sport, and more. Under the control of Adelina Tattilo from its inception until cessation, it began publication in 1967 as an imitation and equivalent of American Playboy, it would later develop its own distinct editorial direction. It ceased publication in 2001 due to a drop in sales and advertising due to the rise of pornographic film.

Adelina, launched in 1980 as the first and only international edition of Playmen.

== Early years ==
Despite a running battle with the Italian police, the magazine reached a circulation of 450,000 within four years of its 1967 inception. It sold at about the equivalent of a US dollar per copy.

Playmen was initially an imitator of Playboy magazine, although the first Girl of the Month, Brigitte Bardot, held her hands to cover her breasts. Playmen later developed a style of its own, reflecting European tastes and not overly displaying breasts as per the American Playboy counterpart. The founder Tattilo was quoted as saying, "The U.S. is a matriarchy. I think this is the reason for the American male preference for women with exaggerated, voluminous bosoms."

In the early years, with Italy still a religiously conservative society at the time, each month the Italian police in some cities would order a mass seizure of the magazine. Playmen rarely lasted more than 48 hours on the newsstands before either being sold out or seized by the police.

== Content ==
Many actresses began their careers on the cover of Playmen: Pamela Villoresi, the singer Patty Pravo, the actress Ornella Muti, the singer Amanda Lear and many others. The magazine contained notables such as Teresa Ann Savoy, Barbara Bouchet, Lilli Carati, and Camille Keaton.

The July 1968 edition contains an article by Henry Miller. In the December 1972 issue, Playmen obtained an international scoop: it published the photo of Jacqueline Kennedy, then wife of Aristotle Onassis, while she was naked in the swimming pool of their villa in the island of Skorpios. The photos were not published in the United States until Hustler printed them in 1975.

In addition to naked women Playmen occasionally also depicted naked men. It paid John Paul Getty III (who was 16 at the time) $1,000 for a naked photo spread and cover of the August 1973 issue – on newsstands a month after the oil empire heir had been kidnapped in Rome.

The magazine contained interviews of significant people in literature, cinema, politics, and sport.

In the 1990s, with the arrival on the market of pornographic videocassettes, the magazine's sales dropped significantly and advertising revenue sharply declined, causing Tattilo's empire to gradually enter a crisis, followed by the closure of Playmen in 2001.

== Adelina magazine ==
In 1979, Tattilo announced that she was planning on publishing — under the company name Chuckleberry Publications — an American edition of Playmen. The magazine was titled "Adelina" (in honor of its publisher) with the tagline, "America's edition of Italy's Playmen". Playboy magazine objected and sought a restraining order. Despite this, a number of issues of Adelina were published in the U.S. in 1980.

In 1981, a federal judge found in Playboy's favor, stating that Adelina's subtitle was "designed to promote Adelina in such a way as to trade on the Playboy mark. It promotes a 'subliminal association with Playboy.'" The judge also forbid Tattilo from renaming Adelina "Playmen" in the U.S.

== See also ==
- List of magazines in Italy
