= Jasmine Trinca =

Italian actress (born 1981)

- Trinca in 2026
- Born: 24 April 1981 (age 45); Rome, Italy
- Occupations: Actress; director
- Years active: 2001–present

Jasmine Trinca (Italian: [ʒaˈzmin ˈtriŋka]; born 24 April 1981) is an Italian actress and film director.

== Life ==
Trinca was born in Rome, Italy. She began her career in 2001, chosen by Nanni Moretti for his award-winning The Son's Room, receiving the Guglielmo Biraghi prize as Best New Talent of the Year. In 2004, she won a Nastro d'Argento for The Best of Youth (La meglio gioventù). Trinca worked again with Moretti in Il caimano (2006).

In 2022, Trinca made her feature-length directorial debut with Marcel!, which premiered at the 75th Cannes Festival.

Trinca was chosen to play Maria Montessori in a biopic of her life. The film, which also includes Leïla Bekhti, achieved distribution deals in 2024.

In June 2024, Trinca was invited to become a member of the Academy of Motion Picture Arts and Sciences.

== Filmography ==
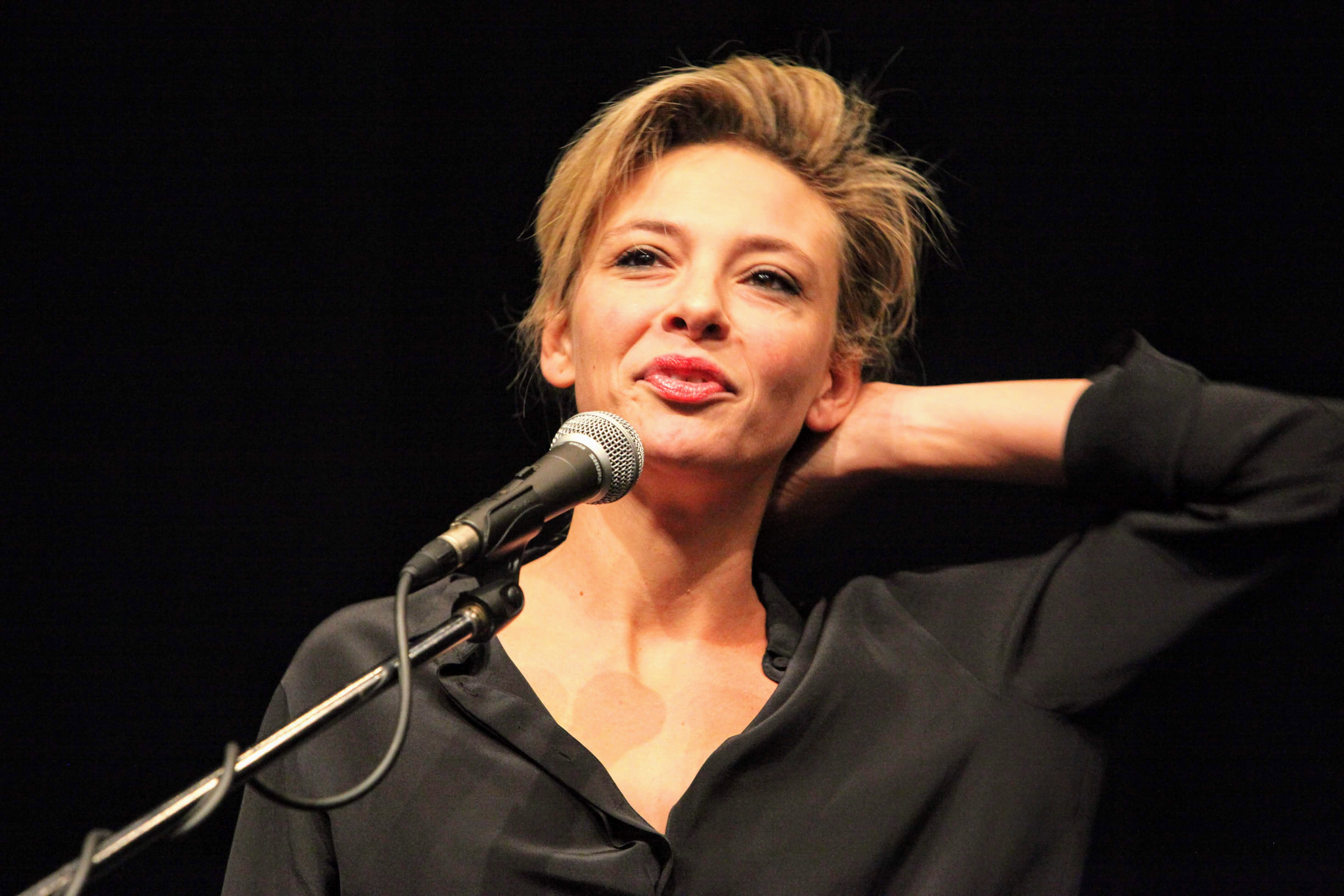
Jasmine Trinca at the Karlovy Vary International Film Festival 2017

=== Film ===
Year	Title	Role	Notes
2001	The Son's Room	Irene Sermonti	
2003	The Best of Youth	Giorgia Esposti	
2005	Manual of Love	Giulia Liguori	
2005	Romanzo Criminale	Roberta Vannucci	
2006	The Caiman	Teresa	
2007	Piano, solo	Cinzia	
2009	The Big Dream	Laura	
2009	Ultimatum	Luisa	
2011	House of Tolerance	Julie	
2013	There Will Come a Day	Augusta	
2013	Miele	Irene / Miele	
2013	Another Life	Aurore Astier	
2014	Saint Laurent	Talitha Getty	
2015	Wondrous Boccaccio	Monna Giovanna	
2015	You Can't Save Yourself Alone	Delia	
2015	The Gunman	Annie	
2016	Tommaso	Chiara	
2016	Slam	Antonella	
2017	Fortunata	Fortunata	
2018	Euphoria	Elena	
2018	On My Skin	Ilaria Cucchi	
2018	The Happiest Man in the World	Herself	Cameo appearance
2019	An Almost Ordinary Summer	Penelope	
2019	The Goddess of Fortune	Annamaria Muscarà	
2020	Romantic Guide to Lost Places	Allegra	
2021	The Story of My Wife	Viola	
2021	The Catholic School	Coralla Martirolo	
2021	Superheroes	Anna	
2023	Profeti	Sara	
2023	A Brighter Tomorrow	Herself	Cameo appearance
2023	Maria Montessori – La Nouvelle Femme	Maria Montessori	
2023	Nuovo Olimpo	Blonde Actress	Cameo appearance
2024	Diamonds	Gabriella Canova	
2025	Gli occhi degli altri	Elena	
2025	La gioia	Carla	
2025	Illusione	Cristina Camponeschi	
2026	The Spiral	Anna	
2026	It Will Happen Tonight	Greta	

=== Television ===
Year	Title	Role	Notes
2004	La fuga degli innocenti	Tilla Nagler	Two-parts television movie
2005	Cefalonia	Elena	Two-parts television movie
2024	La Storia	Ida Ramundo	Lead role; 8 episodes
2024	Supersex	Lucia	Main role; 7 episodes
2025	The Art of Joy	Mother Leonora	2 episodes

=== As filmmaker ===
Year	Title	Role	Notes
2020	Being My Mom	Director	Short film
2022	Marcel!	Director, writer	Full-length directional debut

== Awards and nominations ==
Award	Year	Category	Nominated work	Result
20th Rome Film Festival	2025	Monica Vitti Award for Best Actress	Gli occhi degli altri	Won
66th Venice International Film Festival	2009	Marcello Mastroianni Award for Best Performance by an Emerging Actor or Actress	The Big Dream	Won
70th Cannes Film Festival	2017	Prix d'interprétation féminine – Un Certain Regard section	Fortunata	Won
Ciak d'oro	2001	Best Supporting Actress	The Son's Room	Won
Ciak d'oro	2017	Best Supporting Actress	Slam	Won
Ciak d'oro	2020	Best Actress	The Goddess of Fortune	Nominated
Cinematografo Award	2022	Best Directional Debut	Marcel!	Won
David di Donatello	2001	Best Supporting Actress	The Son's Room	Nominated
David di Donatello	2004	Best Supporting Actress	The Best of Youth	Nominated
David di Donatello	2006	Best Supporting Actress	The Caiman	Nominated
David di Donatello	2013	Best Actress	There Will Come a Day	Nominated
David di Donatello	2014	Best Actress	Miele	Nominated
David di Donatello	2015	Best Actress	You Can't Save Yourself Alone	Nominated
David di Donatello	2018	Best Actress	Fortunata	Won
David di Donatello	2019	Best Supporting Actress	On My Skin	Nominated
David di Donatello	2020	Best Actress	The Goddess of Fortune	Won
David di Donatello	2023	Best Directional Debut	Marcel!	Nominated
David di Donatello	2025	Best Supporting Actress	The Art of Joy	Nominated
Flaiano Award	2022	Outstanding Performance	Superheroes	Won
Globo d'oro	2001	Best Breakthrough Actress	The Son's Room	Won
Globo d'oro	2013	Best Actress	Miele	Won
Globo d'oro	2019	Best Actress	An Almost Ordinary Summer	Won
La pellicola d'oro	2018	Best Actress	Fortunata	Won
Nastro d'Argento	2001	Mario Biraghi Award for Best Breakthrough Performance	The Son's Room	Won
Nastro d'Argento	2001	Best Supporting Actress	The Son's Room	Nominated
Nastro d'Argento	2004	Best Actress	The Best of Youth	Won
Nastro d'Argento	2013	Best Actress	Miele	Won
Nastro d'Argento	2015	Best Actress	You Can't Save Yourself Alone	Nominated
Nastro d'Argento	2017	Best Actress	Fortunata	Won
Nastro d'Argento	2020	Best Actress	The Goddess of Fortune	Won
Nastro d'Argento	2023	Best Actress	Profeti	Nominated
Nastro d'Argento	2025	Special Nastro d'Argento	Diamonds	Won
Nastro d'Argento	2025	Best Supporting Actress in a Television Series	The Art of Joy	Won
Nastro d'Argento	2026	Best Actress	Gli occhi degli altri	Nominated

== Bibliography ==
- Morreale, Emiliano (2025). "Jasmine Trinca: The Smiling Girl Goes #Metoo". In Barra, Luca; Formenti, Cristina; Pierini, Mariapaola; Pitassio, Francesco (eds.). Italian Contemporary Screen Performers. Training, Production, Prestige. Palgrave Macmillan. doi:10.1007/978-3-031-67310-8. ISBN 978-3-031-67309-2.
