= Fortunata (film) =

2017 film

- Theatrical release poster
- Directed by: Sergio Castellitto
- Written by: Margaret Mazzantini
- Starring: Jasmine Trinca; Stefano Accorsi; Alessandro Borghi; Edoardo Pesce; Nicole Centanni; Hanna Schygulla
- Edited by: Chiara Vullo
- Music by: Arturo Annecchino
- Production companies: Indigo Film; HT Film
- Distributed by: Universal Pictures International
- Release dates: 20 May 2017 (Italy); 21 May 2017 (Cannes)
- Running time: 103 minutes
- Country: Italy
- Language: Italian

Fortunata is a 2017 Italian drama directed by Sergio Castellitto. It was screened in the Un Certain Regard section at the 2017 Cannes Film Festival. At Cannes, Jasmine Trinca won the Un Certain Regard Jury Award for Best Performance.

== Cast ==
- Jasmine Trinca as Fortunata
- Hanna Schygulla as Lotte
- Stefano Accorsi as Patrizio
- Alessandro Borghi as Chicano
- Edoardo Pesce as Franco

== Reception ==
Fortunata has an approval rating of 0% on review aggregator website Rotten Tomatoes, based on 6 reviews, and an average rating of 4.3/10.
