= Suburra (film) =

2015 Italian neo-noir crime film

- Theatrical release poster
- Directed by: Stefano Sollima
- Screenplay by: Stefano Rulli; Sandro Petraglia; Carlo Bonini; Giancarlo De Cataldo
- Story by: Stefano Rulli; Sandro Petraglia
- Based on: Suburra by Carlo Bonini; Giancarlo De Cataldo
- Produced by: Riccardo Tozzi; Marco Chimenz; Giovanni Stabilini; Éric Névé
- Starring: Pierfrancesco Favino; Elio Germano; Claudio Amendola
- Cinematography: Paolo Carnera
- Edited by: Patrizio Marone
- Music by: M83
- Production companies: Cattleya; Rai Cinema; La Chauve Souris; Cofinova 11; Cinemage 9
- Distributed by: 01 Distribution
- Release dates: 14 October 2015 (Italy); 9 December 2015 (France)
- Running time: 135 minutes
- Countries: Italy; France
- Language: Italian
- Box office: $5.2 million

Suburra is a 2015 Italian neo-noir crime film directed by Stefano Sollima, based on the 2013 novel of the same name by Carlo Bonini and Giancarlo De Cataldo. The movie was financed by Netflix and RAI. It stars Pierfrancesco Favino, Elio Germano and Claudio Amendola, and focuses on the connections between organized crime and politics in Rome in 2011, inspired by true events from the Mafia Capitale. Suburra was the name of a suburb of Ancient Rome.

In 2017, Netflix released an adaptation of the movie in the form of a television series, Suburra: Blood on Rome. A second television spinoff of the film, titled Suburræterna, was released on 14 November 2023.

== Plot ==
In November 2011, Filippo Malgradi is an Italian MP involved in a bill to change the classification of certain administrative areas; his objective is to allow a real estate project in Ostia so that it could be turned into a Las Vegas-like city. He has close relations with a local crime boss known as "Samurai" — a former neo-fascist terrorist turned professional criminal under the cover of an unsuspecting pump station owner — who also has deep interests in the real estate project. Samurai has privileged ties to the Vatican Bank, who will finance the project for profit.

In a hotel room, Malgradi has sex with two prostitutes, Sabrina and the underage Yelena; when the latter dies from cocaine intoxication, Malgradi leaves and asks Sabrina to dispose of the body. She calls in a favor from Alberto "Spadino" Anacleti, a young member of a Romani crime family, who collects the body and dumps it into a reservoir.

Sebastiano is a pimp who hosts secret parties in his family mansion for members of the Italian high society. After his father commits suicide due to his debts with the Anacleti family, who made their fortune as loan sharks and debt collectors, Sebastiano is summoned by Manfredi, the patriarch of the Anacleti family and Spadino's elder brother. Manfredi threatens Sebastiano into relinquishing all his property to pay for his father's debts.

Spadino blackmails Malgradi into purchasing drugs and prostitutes solely from him and the Anacleti. Malgradi asks for help from a fellow party member who has ties with Aureliano "8-Ball" Adami, a thug who controls the area of the real estate project. 8-Ball has been promised a share of the profits if he convinces local small business owners to sell their properties to Samurai at a bargain. He tries to talk Spadino out of his intent, but the confrontation escalates until 8-Ball kills Spadino, leaving Manfredi enraged and thirsty for revenge.

Fearing for her life, Sabrina seeks shelter from Sebastiano, who lets her stay at his house. She reveals the name of Spadino's killer to him, who in turn tells Manfredi in exchange for clemency. Anacleti's henchmen ambush 8-Ball but fail to kill him. Later, 8-Ball's drug-addicted lover Viola goes on a personal vendetta and enlists one of 8-Ball's henchmen to assassinate the Anacleti hitmen. Fearful that an all-out war between 8-Ball and Manfredi could threaten his real estate interests, Samurai decides to mediate between the two to bring peace. Manfredi forces Sebastiano to hand Sabrina over to him; under duress, Sabrina reveals to Manfredi that Malgradi triggered the events that led to Spadino's murder.

Under the promise of having the mansion returned to him, Sebastiano tells Manfredi that Malgradi is the guarantor of the real estate project. Manfredi breaks into Malgradi's apartment and takes his son hostage, demanding a stake in the profits. Distraught, Malgradi threatens to call off the deal if Samurai does not help him. Samurai attempts to convince 8-Ball to let the Anacleti into the deal and turn Viola in, but after 8-Ball refuses, dismissing Samurai as "obsolete", Samurai executes 8-Ball and his henchmen to pacify Manfredi, who releases Malgradi's son. During the shooting, Viola hides and manages to escape.

Manfredi reneges on his promise to return the family mansion to Sebastiano, and severely beats him. The bill is approved but Yelena's body is found and Malgradi is warned that the judiciary may investigate him. Sebastiano, enraged, assaults Manfredi when he returns home at night, beats him, and locks him in the cage of Manfredi's own ferocious pit bull, who mauls him to death. After the approval of the bill, the Prime Minister resigns from office, which could jeopardize Malgradi's parliamentary immunity. Finally, Viola kills Samurai while he is leaving his mother's apartment.

== Cast ==
- Pierfrancesco Favino as Filippo Malgradi
- Elio Germano as Sebastiano
- Claudio Amendola as "Samurai"
- Alessandro Borghi as Aureliano "Numero 8" Adami
- Greta Scarano as Viola
- Giulia Elettra Gorietti as Sabrina
- Adamo Dionisi as Manfredi Anacleti
- Giacomo Ferrara as Alberto "Spadino" Anacleti
- Antonello Fassari as Sebastiano's father
- Jean-Hugues Anglade as Cardinal Berchet
- Nazzareno Bomba as "Bacarozzo"
- Marco Zangardi as Rognati
- Yulia Kolomiets as Yelena

== Reception ==
=== Box office ===
The film made €1,742,182 in its opening weekend in Italy, totaling €4.7 million in Italy, for a grand total of $5.1 million including the international box office.

=== Critical response ===
Suburra was well received by critics. It currently holds a 91% approval rating on review aggregation website Rotten Tomatoes, based on 23 reviews with an average rating of 7.3/10.

Lee Marshall of Screen International and Jacob Stolworthy of The Independent praised the film for its casting, filming and soundtrack. Hanh Nguyen of IndieWire stated, "While it delivered shocks and spectacle, its characterizations felt shallow and stereotypical — probably because it tried to pack too much into its 130-minute runtime."

== See also ==
- List of Italian films of 2015
