= February 1969 =

Month of 1969

<<	February 1969					>>
Su	Mo	Tu	We	Th	Fr	Sa
						1
2	3	4	5	6	7	8
9	10	11	12	13	14	15
16	17	18	19	20	21	22
23	24	25	26	27	28

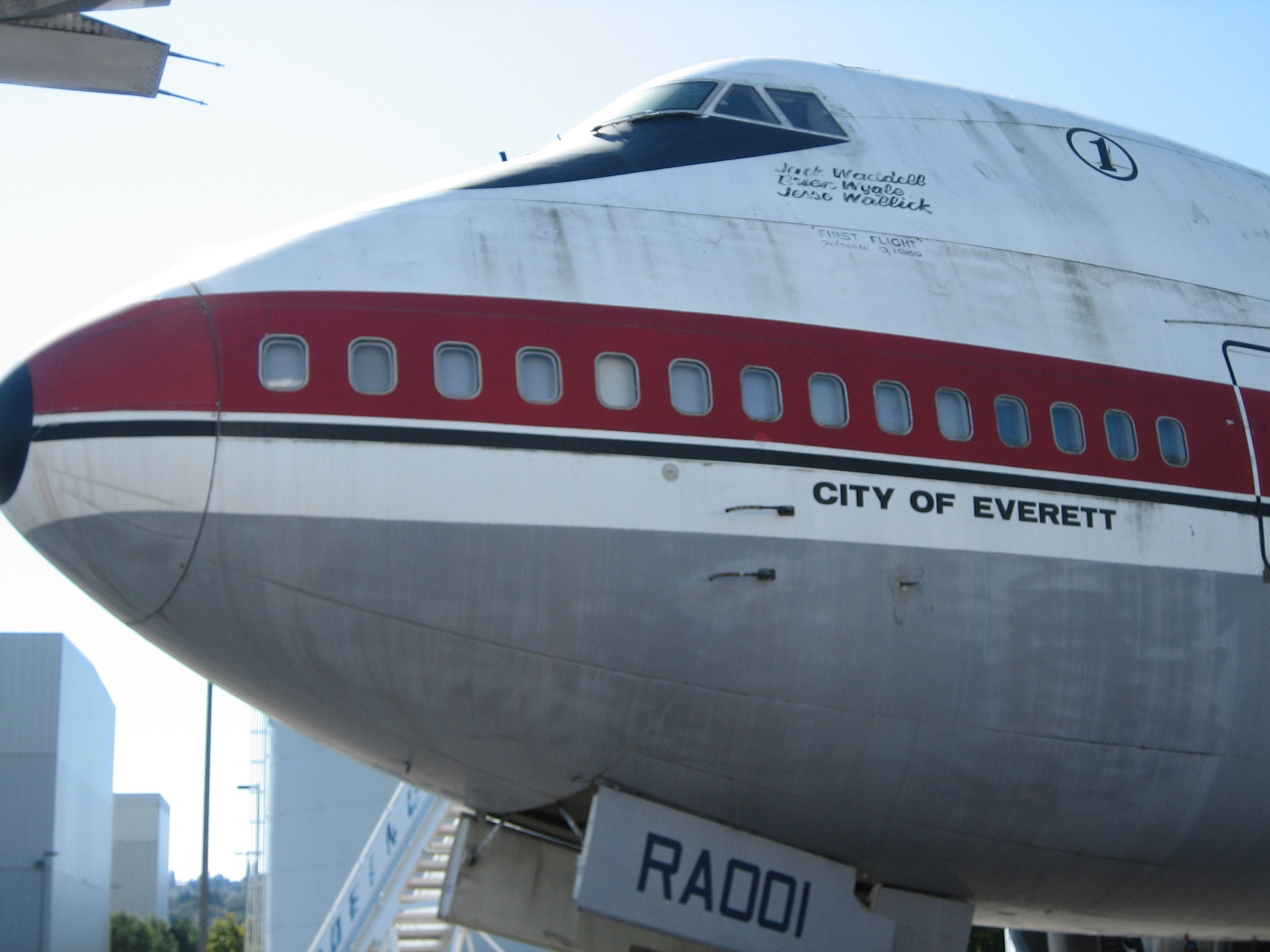
February 9, 1969: First Boeing 747 "jumbo jet" takes flight

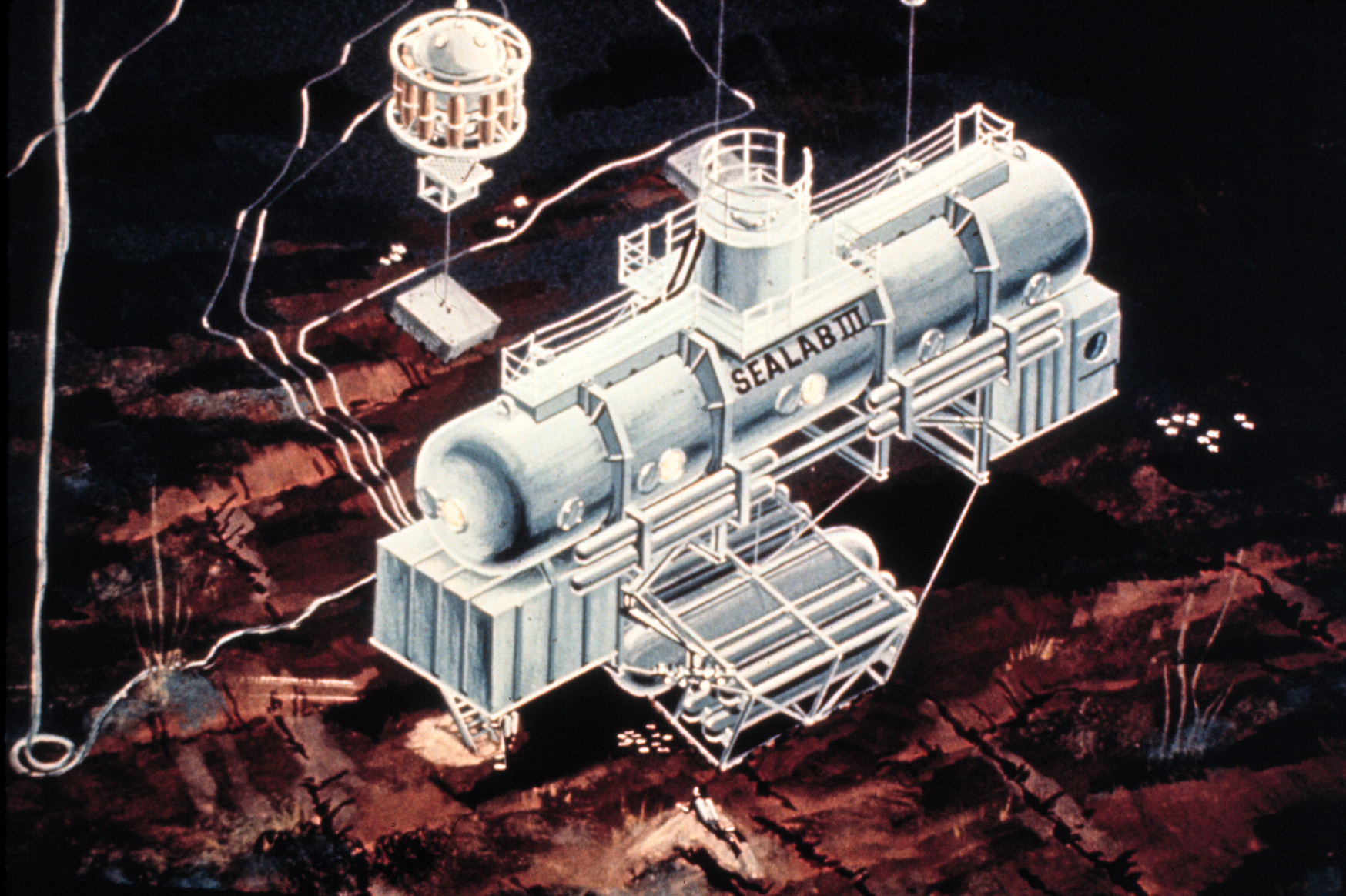
February 17, 1969: Fatal SEALAB III accident ends U.S. Navy research program

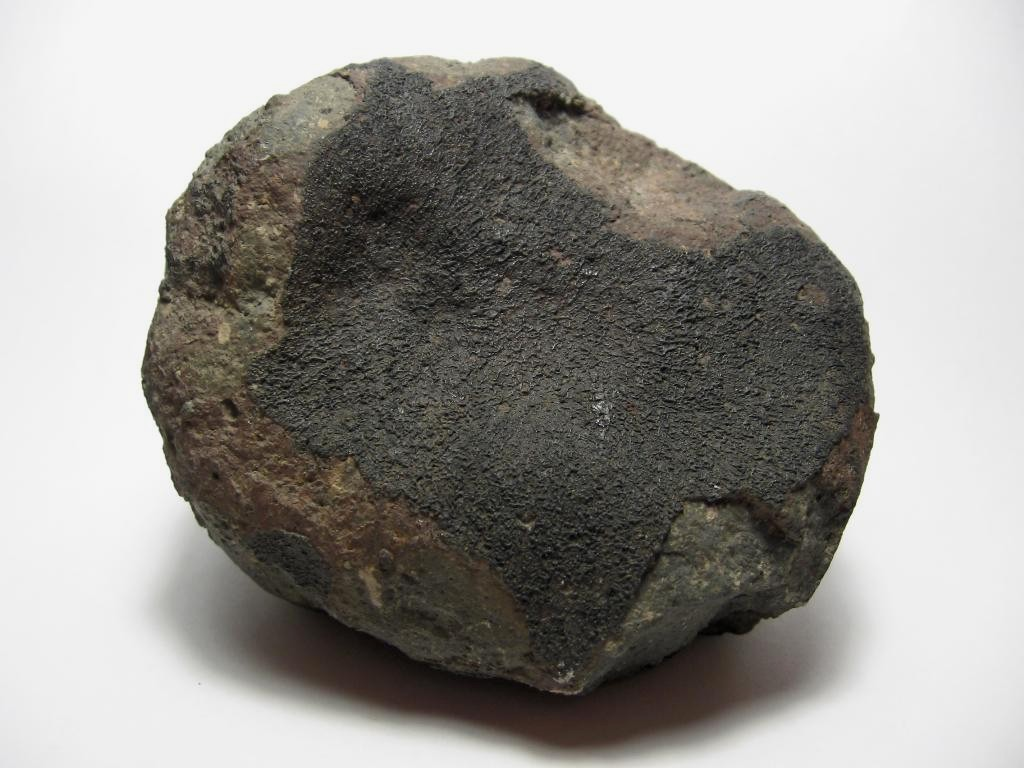
February 8, 1969: Meteorite explodes over Mexico

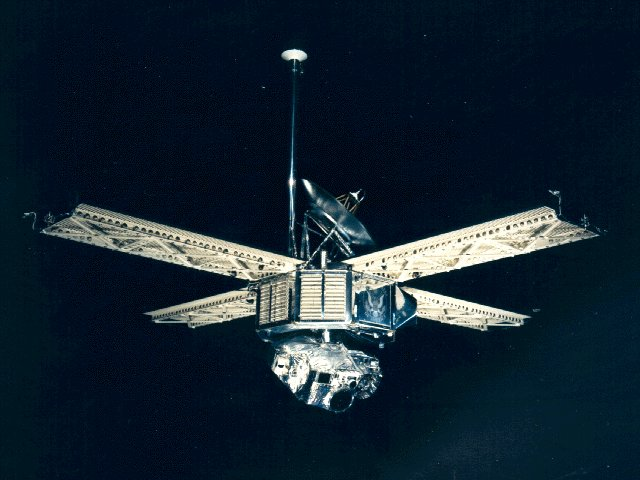
February 24, 1969: U.S. Mariner 6 launched toward Mars

The following events occurred in February 1969:

== February 1, 1969 (Saturday) ==
- U.S. President Richard M. Nixon instructed his national security adviser, Henry Kissinger, to pursue a secret plan of action to establish dialogue between the governments of the United States and the People's Republic of China beginning with meetings between diplomats in Poland, where both nations had embassies.
- Born:
  - Gabriel Batistuta, Argentine-born soccer football striker who starred in Italy's Serie A major league, and for Argentina's national team in three World Cup competitions; in Avellaneda, Santa Fe Province
  - Andrew Breitbart, American conservative news publisher and creator of the Breitbart website (d. 2012); in Los Angeles

== February 2, 1969 (Sunday) ==
- The Burdell Mansion commune, home at one time to members of the Grateful Dead rock band and later to more than 50 hippies who called their group The Chosen Family, was destroyed by an electrical fire. Decades later, California state archaeologists would excavate the ruins to study the hippie culture.
- Born: Dambisa Moyo, Zambian-born economist and author of four bestselling books, including 2010's How the West Was Lost; in Lusaka
- Died: Boris Karloff (William Henry Pratt), 81, English-born actor known for portrayal of Frankenstein's monster in horror films, and as the narrator in the cartoon adaptation of How the Grinch Stole Christmas!

== February 3, 1969 (Monday) ==
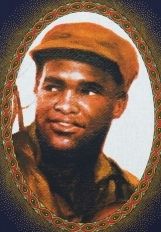
Mondlane

- Eduardo Mondlane, the 48-year-old leader of the Mozambique nationalist organization FRELIMO, was assassinated by a time bomb that had been planted inside a book mailed to him at his headquarters in Dar es Salaam in Tanzania. Investigators were never able to determine whether Mondlane's murder had been carried out by the Portuguese colonial government of Mozambique or by Mondlane's rivals within FRELIMO. Mondlane was succeeded by Samora Machel, who would become the first President of Mozambique when the east African nation was granted independence by Portugal in 1975.
- At the Palestinian National Congress in Cairo, Yasser Arafat was elected as the new chairman of the Palestine Liberation Organization (PLO), replacing Yahya Hammuda. Arafat would serve as PLO Chairman until shortly before his death in 2004.
- As the hijacking to Cuba of American passenger jets continued, Eastern Air Lines Flight 7 was diverted to Havana along with its 87 passengers, including Allen Funt and a crew from the popular practical joke TV show, Candid Camera. The plane was diverted as it approached Miami on its flight from Newark, New Jersey. Because of Funt's reputation as the host of the hidden camera prank show, many of the passengers thought at first that the hijacking was part of the filming of a Candid Camera episode.
- Born:
  - Retief Goosen, South African professional golfer and 2001 and 2004 U.S. Open winner; in Pietersburg (now Polokwane)
  - Beau Biden (Joseph R. Biden III), American politician and Attorney General of Delaware from 2007 to 2015; in Wilmington, Delaware (died of brain cancer, 2015)
- Died:
  - C. N. Annadurai, 59, Chief Minister of Tamil Nadu, died just 20 days after he had successfully lobbied for the name of the populous (over 40 million residents) state of India to be changed from Madras to Tamil Nadu.
  - Al Taliaferro, 63, American comic strip artist who had drawn the Donald Duck newspaper comic since 1938

== February 4, 1969 (Tuesday) ==
- The derailment of the Trichinopoly to Madras express train in India killed 25 people and injured another 25. Nearly all of the victims had been non-paying passengers riding on the roof of the train.
- Born: Maniac (stage name for Sven Erik Kristiansen), Norwegian musician, best known as the former vocalist in the black metal band Mayhem

== February 5, 1969 (Wednesday) ==
- Turn-On, a new sketch comedy show on ABC from the creators of NBC's popular Laugh-In, premiered at 8:30 in the evening Eastern time, for its first and only episode. One television station in Cleveland, WEWS-TV, took the show off the air after the first commercial break, and stations in Portland and Seattle refused to air it after learning of the reaction in the earlier time zones. Enough viewers and ABC station owners were offended by the show and its cancellation was announced two days later.
- Thirty-one people were killed in a fire at the Bandai Kokusai Hotel in the Japanese ski resort of Koriyama, and another 28 injured. The blaze broke out in the hotel's nightclub and was driven by winter winds throughout the building. Masaki Matsushita, a nude dancer at the nightclub, told fire investigators later that she had accidentally started the blaze when she had "placed a gasoline-soaked rag on an oil stove backstage" while preparing to perform her act before 300 customers.
- António de Oliveira Salazar, the Prime Minister of Portugal who had ruled the nation as its dictator from 1932 until a brain hemorrhage in 1968, was released from the hospital in Lisbon. Salazar had been replaced as prime minister while in a coma, but would not be told of the decision; he would continue in the belief that he ruled as Portugal's leader until his death in 1970.
- Angeles Flying Service Flight 601, a Beechcraft Super H18 air taxi that regularly ferried passengers from Port Angeles, Washington to Seattle, crashed and burned immediately after its early-morning takeoff, killing all 10 people aboard.
- Born:
  - Michael Sheen, Welsh stage and film actor; in Newport
  - Bobby Brown, American R&B singer and songwriter; in Boston
- Died:
  - Conrad Hilton Jr., 42, American businessman, heir to the Hilton Hotels fortune, and playboy, died from complications of alcoholism
  - Thelma Ritter, 66, American stage and film actress

== February 6, 1969 (Thursday) ==
- Residents of the West Indies island of Anguilla voted overwhelmingly for independence from the United Kingdom and the creation of a republic. The final result was 1,739 in favor and only four against on the island of 6,000 people. British paratroopers and municipal policemen from St. Kitts would invade the island on March 19 and dismantle the republic.
- Born: Masaharu Fukuyama, Japanese singer-songwriter and actor; in Nagasaki

== February 7, 1969 (Friday) ==
- Nine passengers were killed, and 47 seriously injured in Australia after the engineer of the Southern Aurora express train had a fatal heart attack as he approached the crossing at Violet Town, Victoria. The train was nearing the end of its overnight trip from Sydney to Melbourne and passengers were preparing to eat breakfast when the collision with a freight train happened at 7:10 in the morning. A subsequent autopsy concluded that engineer John Bowden was dead before the train ran through two warning signals and a stop signal.
- Diane Crump of Woodmont, Connecticut, became the first woman jockey to ride a racehorse in American competition. With odds of 50-to-1 on the horse, Bridle 'n Bit, 19-year-old Crump finished tenth in a field of 12 in the seventh race that day at Florida's Hialeah race track near Miami.
- The highest gust of wind in British history took place at Kirkwall, at Scotland's Orkney Isles on the North Sea, with a wind burst measured at 136 miles per hour (219 km/h).
- Died: Frank "Cannonball" Richards, 81, American carnival and vaudeville performer whose act involved taking heavy blows to his stomach

== February 8, 1969 (Saturday) ==
- At 1:05 in the morning local time (07:05 UTC), the Allende meteorite exploded as it entered the atmosphere over the village of Pueblito de Allende in Mexico's Chihuahua state. As the meteor exploded into two pieces which then fragmented into thousands, most of the stones fell in and around Pueblito Allende. Eventually, more than two tonnes — 2,000 kilograms (4,400 lb) — of fragments would be picked up; the Allende meteorite has become the most studied in the world, and is among the rarest because of its composition of carbonaceous chondrite.
- February 8, 1969, was the last date for an issue of the weekly magazine, The Saturday Evening Post, though it was placed on newsstands and sent to subscribers a week earlier. The Post would be resurrected a year later as a semi-monthly magazine.

== February 9, 1969 (Sunday) ==
- The Boeing 747 "jumbo jet" was flown for the first time, taking off at 11:44 in the morning Pacific Time from Boeing's Paine Field airfield at Everett, Washington. The flight had been scheduled to last two and a half hours, but pilot Jack Waddell reported difficulty with a wing flap 34 minutes after takeoff, and the 335 ton jet, largest commercial airliner in the world, returned for a landing at 12:49.
- The ADN news agency of East Germany announced that the government would bar travel along the three corridors from West Germany to West Berlin, effective February 15, in an apparent effort to block West German state and federal officials from participating in the March 5 presidential election, to be held in West Berlin by 1,036 electors.
- TACCOMSAT, the Tactical Communications Satellite and the largest communications satellite to ever be launched from the United States, was put into a geostationary orbit above the equator by a Titan 3C booster rocket launched from Cape Kennedy.
- The Israeli Navy recovered the distress buoy from the submarine INS Dakar, which had disappeared in the Mediterranean Sea on January 25, 1968. However, the wreckage itself would not be located for another 30 years, finally being found on May 28, 1999.
- Born: Ian Eagle, American TV sports announcer; in Miami
- Died: Gabby Hayes, 83, American character actor in Western films who portrayed the sidekick comedy relief for Hopalong Cassidy, Roy Rogers and several other Western stars.

== February 10, 1969 (Monday) ==
- The Kingdom of Thailand held elections for Parliament for the first time since the 1958 military coup, in accordance with the new 1968 constitution. Field Marshal Thanom Kittikachorn, who had been prime minister since 1963, retained his office as the leader of the new military-backed United Thai People's Party (UTPP), which won 75 of the 219 seats in the House of Representatives. Thirty of the 72 winning independent candidates would join the UTPP.

== February 11, 1969 (Tuesday) ==
- U.S. President Nixon called for "a war on organized crime", requesting Congress to pass laws allowing confiscation of Mafia assets including any funds traced to criminal activity. The result would be the passage of the Organized Crime Control Act of 1970 (OCCA).
- Thirteen days after seizing control of the computer center at Sir George Williams University in Montreal, student protesters set fire to the room on the seventh floor of the Henry F. Hall Building as city police moved to retake the facility. The climax to the siege, which ended with the arrest of 50 students, was the damage of computers and data worth one million dollars.
- Divers of the Italian Navy controlled an explosion that destroyed the platform on which engineer Giorgio Rosa proclaimed the Republic of Rose Island.
- Born:
  - Bill Warner, American motorcycle racer and one-time holder of the land speed record of 311.945 miles per hour (502.027 km/h); in Little Falls, New York (killed in motorcycle crash, 2013)
  - Jennifer Aniston, American TV actress and comedienne best known for portraying Rachel Green on Friends; in Sherman Oaks, California

== February 12, 1969 (Wednesday) ==
- Raymond Barre, the EEC Commissioner for Economic and Financial Affairs, presented the "Barre Plan", the first step within the six Common Market nations to coordinate their economic and monetary policies, to the European Economic Community. Belgium, France, Italy, Luxembourg, the Netherlands and West Germany would approve the plan on July 17.
- NASA launched another Apollo Applications Project (AAP)-related Aerobee 150 sounding rocket from White Sands Missile Range. The rocket carried a Naval Research Laboratory payload to a 187.9-kilometre (116.8 mi) altitude to record photographically 18 extreme ultraviolet spectra of solar photosphere, chromosphere, and corona, using a flight design verification unit of the high-resolution spectrograph planned for Apollo Telescope Mount (ATM)-A and ATM-B. Rocket and instruments performed satisfactorily.
- Born:
  - Hong Myung-bo, manager of the South Korea national soccer football team from 1990 to 2002; in Seoul
  - Darren Aronofsky, American film director known for Pi and Black Swan; in New York City

== February 13, 1969 (Thursday) ==
- African-American students staged simultaneous protests on college campuses across the United States as part of the "Black Campus Movement" (BCM). An author would later write that "If there was a day, or the day, that black campus activists forced the racial reconstruction of higher education, it was February 13, 1969... It was like no other day in the history of black higher education... this day had been in the making for more than one hundred years and changed the course of higher education for decades to come."
- Front de libération du Québec (FLQ) terrorists set off a time bomb at the Canadian Stock Exchange and the Montreal Exchange injuring 27 people. At 2:45 in the afternoon, an anonymous phone call warned of a bomb somewhere in the building, but the explosion happened only three minutes later at the trading floor. At the time, there were 300 traders, exchange employees and people taking orders by phone.
- Born: Bryan Thomas Schmidt, American science fiction author and editor; in Topeka
- Died: Florence Mary Taylor, 89, Australian architect, engineer and pilot

== February 14, 1969 (Friday) ==
- Pope Paul VI issued Mysterii Paschalis, a motu proprio, deleting many names from the Roman calendar of saints, including Valentine, who was celebrated on this day.
- Died: Vito Genovese, 71, Italian-born American mobster, died of a heart attack while imprisoned at the federal medical center in Springfield, Missouri. Genovese, nicknamed "The King of the Racketeers", had continued to run his Mafia empire from prison while serving a 15-year sentence for narcotics trafficking.

== February 15, 1969 (Saturday) ==
- Four U.S. Department of Interior scientists (Ed Clifton, Conrad Mahnken, Richard Waller and John VanDerwalker) entered the undersea habitat Tektite I on the seabed of Great Lameshur Bay off the U.S. Virgin Islands with the goal of setting a record for living and working in a saturation diving environment. By March 18, the four aquanauts had set a new record for longest time underwater by a single team, and they remained at Tektite I until April 15, returning to the surface after 58 days undersea.
- Born:
  - Roberto Balado, Cuban amateur super heavyweight boxer, 1992 Olympic gold medalist and three-time world amateur champion (1989, 1991, 1993); in Jovellanos (killed in car accident, 1994)
  - Birdman (stage name for Bryan Christopher Williams), American rap music artist and entrepreneur; in New Orleans
- Died:
  - Zahurul Haq, 34, Pakistani Air Force officer and one of the 35 defendants in the Agartala Conspiracy Case, was fatally shot while in jail and awaiting trial. His death would cause so much outrage in East Pakistan that the Pakistani government would decide to drop the conspiracy charges and release the remaining defendants only a few days later. Within two years, the uprising would lead to East Pakistan becoming independent as Bangladesh, and Haq is now celebrated as a Bengali martyr.
  - Pee Wee Russell, 62, American jazz drummer

== February 16, 1969 (Sunday) ==
- Fifteen travelers were arrested by Communist China's navy after the yachts they were sailing strayed into Chinese territorial waters as they traveled from Hong Kong to Macao. The people on board the luxury yachts Morasum, Reverie and Uin-Na-Mara included four Americans, two Britons, three Taiwanese and a Frenchman. The 15 (four of whom were children), who were in Hong Kong to celebrate the Chinese New Year, had been warned not to make the trip because of the weather and found themselves surrounded by People's Liberation Army Navy gunboats. The group would be held captive on the mainland for seven weeks, until the release of 13 of the 15 on April 3, when the Reverie and the Uin-Na-Mara would be allowed to return to Hong Kong. The Morasum, however, would be held by China, along with its captain, Simeon Baldwin, and a passenger, Bessie Hope Donald, because of the yacht's electronic equipment and a suspicion that it was being used for espionage. Baldwin, Donald, and the Morasum were eventually allowed to leave on December 7.
- The state of emergency that had existed in Pakistan (including East Pakistan, now Bangladesh) since 1965 was lifted by Pakistan's President Mohammad Ayub Khan.

== February 17, 1969 (Monday) ==
- Soviet Ambassador to Washington Anatoly Dobrynin was hosted by U.S. President Richard Nixon for the first time. After meeting at the White House, they agreed to set up "a secret back channel" between Dobrynin and Henry Kissinger to discuss the possibility of nuclear disarmament.
- Sixteen people were killed in South Africa, and another 70 seriously injured, when their passenger train collided with an overturned gasoline tanker car at Langlaagte, a suburb of Johannesburg.
- Died:
  - Berry L. Cannon, 33, American aquanaut, died of carbon dioxide poisoning while attempting to repair the SEALAB III habitat off San Clemente Island, California. "Had it not been for the tragic loss," an author would write later, "who knows how far the U.S. Navy might have advanced undersea research? It was his death, though, that caused the funding sponsors of this research to withdraw their support and the SEALAB program died a quiet death."
  - Paul Barbarin, 69, American jazz drummer, suffered a fatal heart attack while leading his Onward Brass Band on St. Charles Street in a parade held in New Orleans on the night before the Mardi Gras celebrations. Barbarin stopped to ask for a glass of water before being stricken moments later.

== February 18, 1969 (Tuesday) ==
- All 35 passengers and crew on board Hawthorne Nevada Airlines Flight 708 were killed after their DC-8 plane crashed into the side of Mount Whitney shortly after taking off from Hawthorne, Nevada. The 32 passengers had spent the previous day at the El Capitan Casino and were returning to Long Beach, California. The wreckage of the "gambler's special" would not be located until August 8.
- Eight people in the small town of Crete, Nebraska, were killed, and 11 others seriously injured, after a railroad tank car ruptured and spread a fog of anhydrous ammonia fumes throughout the community. Five of the dead were residents, and another three were hoboes who had been riding aboard the Burlington Railroad train as it traveled from Denver to Chicago.
- The name of the House Un-American Activities Committee (HUAC) was changed to the Committee on Internal Security by a 305 to 79 vote in the U.S. House of Representatives.

== February 19, 1969 (Wednesday) ==
- In its race against the United States to be the first to land a man on the Moon (with veteran cosmonaut Alexei Leonov as commander), the Soviet Union attempted to place Lunokhod lunar rover into low Earth orbit, to be taken to the Moon by a more powerful rocket, the N1. Less than a minute after liftoff from Baikonur, however, the uncrewed mission ended when the rocket booster exploded. A second setback would follow two days later.
- Casey Station, an innovative Antarctic research station for the Australian Antarctic Territory, was established. Originally referred to as "Repstat" because it was the replacement station for the Wilkes Station, it was renamed in honor of Richard Casey, the outgoing Governor-General of Australia.
- The British Postal Museum & Archive, now simply referred to as The Postal Museum, was opened at the King Edward Building in a ceremony presided over by Queen Elizabeth II.

== February 20, 1969 (Thursday) ==
- U.S. President Richard M. Nixon asked Congress to begin the process of abolishing the Electoral College with a proposed amendment to the U.S. Constitution to be considered by the states. Nixon, who said that the American presidential voting system "once again requires overhaul to repair defects spotlighted by the circumstances of 1968" suggested that the amendment take the form of either dividing each state's electoral votes "in a manner that may more closely approximate the popular vote" in the state, or that the popular vote winner be declared president as long as he or she had gotten at least 40 percent of the vote. If no candidate won at least 40%, the top two vote getters would face each other in a runoff election.

== February 21, 1969 (Friday) ==
- The second major setback for the Soviet Union's crewed lunar program happened as the most powerful Soviet rocket, the uncrewed N1, was launched for the first time. The rocket lifted off from the Baikonur Cosmodrome, in the Kazakh SSR, at 3:18 in the afternoon local time (0918 UTC). Only 70 seconds later, however, its 30 engines shut down by themselves, or by a destruct order from ground control. The payload, a modified lunar spacecraft, separated and landed 21 miles (34 km) from Baikonur, and the rest of the N1 fell 31 miles (50 km) further. An author for Popular Science magazine would comment more than 40 years later, "In less than two minutes, the Soviets’ last valiant effort to beat America to the Moon was reduced to piles of twisted and burnt metal.
- The official newspaper of the Central Committee of the Chinese Communist Party, People's Daily, announced the party's decision to concentrate resources on "socialist industrialization" to quickly develop small-scale factories in the nation's rural provinces. In the two years following the publication of the editorial "Grasp Revolution, Promote Production and Win a New Victory on the Industrial Front", tens of thousands of iron works, cement plants, fertilizer plants and other small production facilities would be constructed, especially in the provinces of Heilongjiang, Henan, Hebei, Hunan, Hubei, Guangxi and Shandong.
- A volcanic eruption began on Deception Island, the site of Antarctic research stations established by both the United Kingdom and by Chile. The blast triggered flooding, and by the time it ended less than 48 hours later, the abandoned Chilean research station was destroyed and the British station was so severely damaged that it had to be abandoned permanently.
- With his popularity in sharp decline, Pakistan's President Ayub Khan announced that he would not run for re-election.
- Born: Petra Kronberger, Austrian alpine skier, 1992 Olympic double gold medalist and the first woman to win races in all five World Cup skiing events (downhill, slalom, giant slalom, super giant slalom and combined downhill and slalom) in one racing season (1990–91); in St. Johann im Pongau

== February 22, 1969 (Saturday) ==
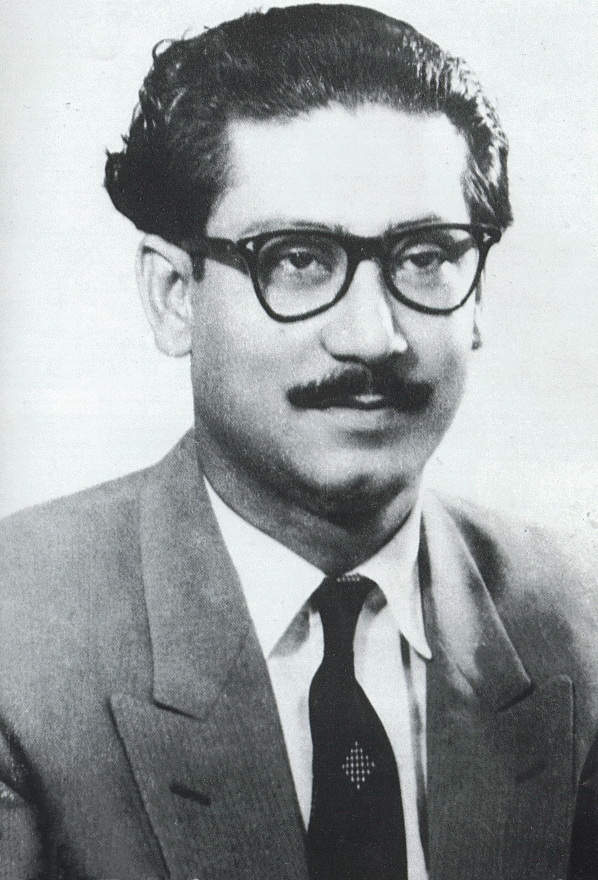
Sheikh Mujibur of East Pakistan

- Sheikh Mujibur Rahman, the Bengali leader of the Awami League and leader of the fight for the rights of the Bengali Muslim residents of East Pakistan against the Pakistan government, was released unconditionally after nine months imprisonment. Mujib and 33 others were set free as Pakistan's government dropped all charges arising from the Agartala Conspiracy Case, the orders coming on the same day as more than a million students protested the government of Ayub Khan. In 1971, East Pakistan would become independent from West Pakistan as the new nation of Bangladesh, with Mujib as its first president.
- The final stage of the Tet Offensive, the North Vietnamese Army and Viet Cong attack on South Vietnam, was launched on multiple provinces. The "Vietnam Spring Offensive", which would lead to President Nixon's decision to carry the Vietnam War into Cambodia, would continue until June 8.
- The Popular Democratic Front for the Liberation of Palestine was founded.
- Born:
  - Thomas Jane, American TV actor; as Thomas Elliott III in Baltimore
  - Clinton Kelly, Panamanian-born American television host; in Panama City

== February 23, 1969 (Sunday) ==
- In the aftermath of the new Communist offensive against South Vietnam during the American halt of bombing, U.S. President Nixon decided to expand the Vietnam War into Cambodia. Nixon was en route to Brussels on Air Force One for his first tour of Europe as president when, as Henry Kissinger would later recount, "he suddenly ordered the bombing of the Cambodian sanctuaries" of the Viet Cong guerrillas, "without consulting relevant officials" and "in the absence of a detailed plan for dealing with the consequences." Nixon would cancel the order two days later after his aides intervened, but would order the first attack on March 18.
- Born: Michael Campbell, New Zealand professional golfer, 2005 U.S. Open winner and winner the same year of the HSBC World Match Play Championship; in Hāwera
- Died:
  - King Saud, 67, ruler of Saudi Arabia from 1953 until he was forced to abdicate in favor of his son, King Faisal, in 1964, died of a heart attack.
  - Madhubala (screen name for Mumtaz Jehan Dehlavi), 36, Indian actress and leading lady of Hindi cinema, died of a lung illness

== February 24, 1969 (Monday) ==
- The landmark decision of Tinker v. Des Moines Independent Community School District was issued by the United States Supreme Court, which ruled that the First Amendment to the United States Constitution applies to public schools within limits. The case stemmed from an incident on December 16, 1965, when students Mary Beth Tinker, John Tinker and Christopher Eckhardt wore black armbands to school to protest the Vietnam War, and then were suspended after declining to remove them. Justice Abe Fortas, writing for the 7 to 2 majority, observed that "It can hardly be argued that either students or teachers shed their constitutional rights to freedom of speech or expression at the schoolhouse gate," but added that schools retained the right to deter protests that "materially and substantially interfere with the requirements of appropriate discipline in the operation of the school."
- Firing mortars from Jordan, Al-Fatah guerrillas lobbed artillery shells at the country residence of Israel's Prime Minister Levi Eshkol at Degania Alef near the Sea of Galilee. In acknowledging the attack, the Israeli government noted that Eshkol was in Jerusalem for more than three weeks.
- The American Mariner 6 probe was launched from Cape Kennedy, Florida in the United States at 8:29 p.m. local time, to begin a 226,300,000 mile journey to Mars, where it was scheduled to make its closest approach on July 31.

== February 25, 1969 (Tuesday) ==
- U.S. President Nixon announced that the United States would unilaterally discontinue its offensive biological weapons program, and that research would be limited to defense against bio-weapons. Among the reasons was that the weapons had limited utility and were not a reliable deterrent and that it was important to discourage their acquisition by other nations.
- Died: Jan Zajíc, 18, a Czech student who, following the example of Jan Palach the previous month, set himself on fire to protest the Soviet Union's occupation of Czechoslovakia.

== February 26, 1969 (Wednesday) ==
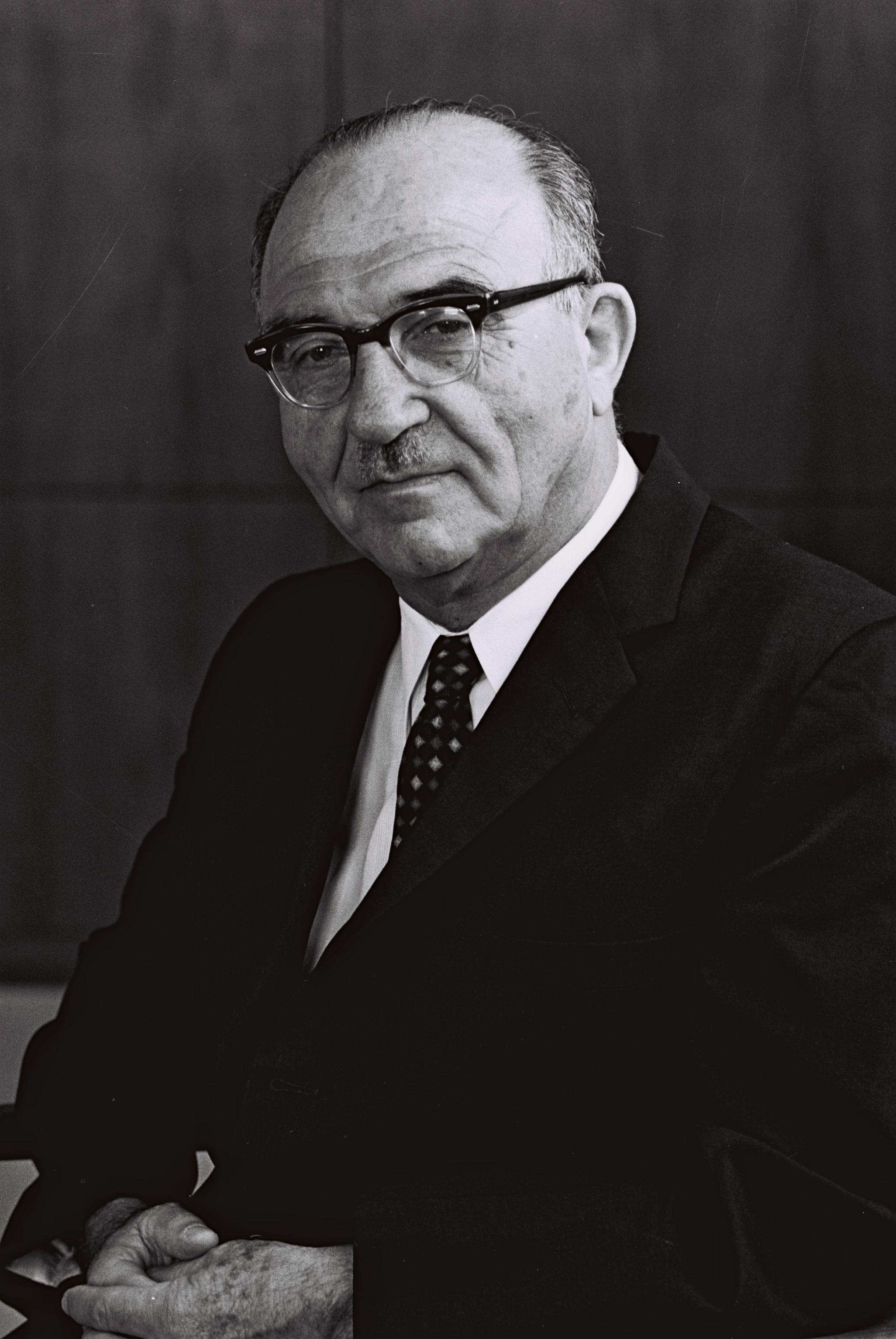
Eshkol

- Levi Eshkol, who had served as the Prime Minister of Israel since 1963, died of a heart attack in Jerusalem while convalescing from a February 3 myocardial infarction. Deputy Prime Minister Yigal Allon acted as the interim premier until the Knesset could choose a permanent replacement from one of three candidates— Allon, Defense Minister Moshe Dayan and former foreign minister Golda Meir. The Al Fatah guerrilla organization claimed in a statement issued from Damascus that its February 24 rocket attack on Eshkol's rural residence had been the cause of wounds that claimed Eshkol's life, and the Israeli government's response was that "It is the most ridiculous and infantile of the Fatah's 1,001 nights fairy tales." Meir would become the new prime minister in March.
- Died: Karl Jaspers, 86, German-born Swiss psychiatrist and existentialist

== February 27, 1969 (Thursday) ==
- One of the least successful Broadway productions, But, Seriously, opened at Henry Miller's Theatre. Despite a cast that included Richard Dreyfuss and Tom Poston, and the authorship of Academy Award-winning film screenwriter Julius J. Epstein (who won the Oscar for Casablanca), the play would be performed only four times, with its final performance on Saturday, March 1. But, Seriously would also prove to be the last Broadway play to be staged at Henry Miller's Theatre, which would not be revived for more than 30 years.
- Died:
  - John Boles, 73, American film actor and singer
  - Marius Barbeau, 85, Canadian anthropologist

== February 28, 1969 (Friday) ==
- Sirhan Bishara Sirhan, on trial in Los Angeles for the 1968 murder of presidential candidate Robert F. Kennedy, stood up in court shortly after the first defense witness began to testify. After Superior Court Judge Herbert V. Walker sent the jury out and allowed Sirhan to speak, the accused assassin said "At this time I wish to withdraw my original plea of innocent and plead guilty on all counts," then added on further questioning that "I will ask to be executed," and that "I believe it is in my best interests. That is my prerogative." Judge Walker declined to accept the guilty plea, along with Sirhan's request to fire the three attorneys who had volunteered to defend him.
- Following an uprising in western Guyana's Rupununi area by the indigenous minority, Prime Minister Forbes Burnham met with 150 chiefs and their advisers from the nine tribes (the Wai Wai, Macushi, Patamona, Lokono, Kalina, Wapishana, Pemon, Akawaio and Warao) and pledged that they would be started on the path toward full Guyanese citizenship and that one of them would be chosen to be on the government's Lands Commission. Burnham's promises were a step toward meeting the Amerindian's demands, but would reportedly be considered by them to be insufficient.
- A 7.8 magnitude earthquake struck Portugal and Morocco at 2:42 UTC, killing 11 people in Morocco and two in Portugal.
- Born:
  - Robert Sean Leonard, Tony Award-winning American stage, TV, and film actor; as Robert Lawrence Leonard in Westwood, New Jersey
  - Pat Monahan, American singer-songwriter, frontman of the band Train; in Erie, Pennsylvania
