= Berardo Carboni =

Italian director

Berardo Carboni (born in Atri, 27 January 1975) is an Italian director, screenwriter and producer.

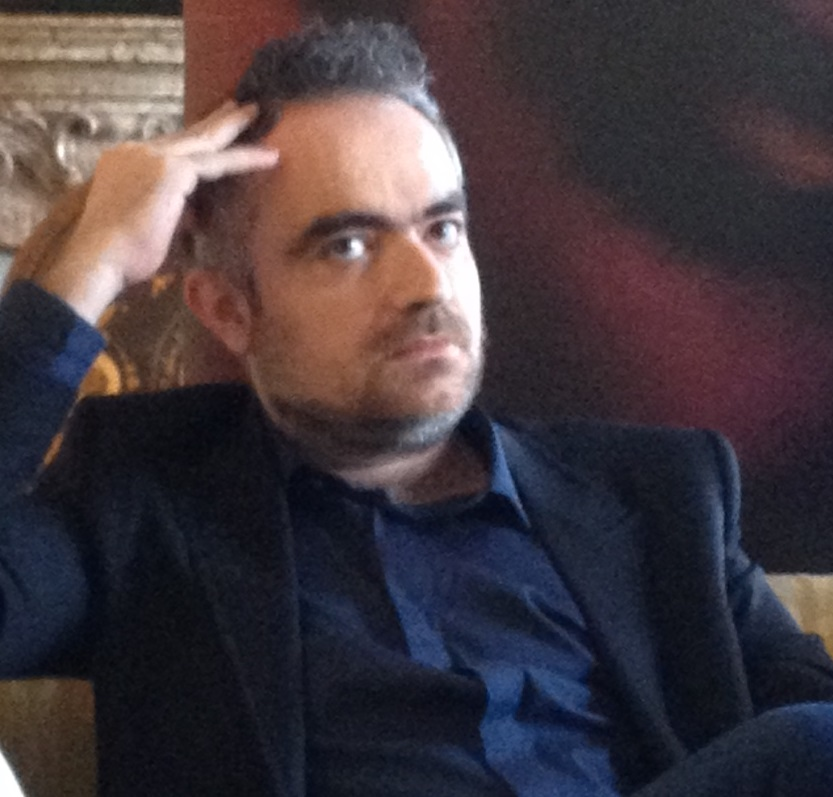
picture of Berardo Carboni

== Biography ==
Graduated in law, he has a PhD in “civil problems of the human being”. As scriptwriter and director, he has made shorts and documentaries, including Roma in quel niente, a documentary about Federico Caffè with Giorgio Ruffolo, Valentino Parlato and the former President of the Italian Republic Carlo Azeglio Ciampi. Since 2000, he has been working with Lara Favaretto on videos for the art circuit that have been awarded in contexts such as “Furla Prize” and “Moma P.S. 1 studio program”. Together with Favaretto, he also worked in 2003 on the TV film Buco nell'acqua, a docudrama with Sandra Milo, produced by Kublakhan for Mediatrade.

From 2005 until 2008, he produced and directed the film Shooting Silvio which was produced by popular subscription and became an international media event. It was selected and awarded at film festivals in Rome, Annecy, Tiburon, and Kyiv. He won the best director prize at the Gallio Film Festival.

From 2009 until 2010, he worked on Vola Vola, an experimental animated film, a machinima, entirely shot in a Second Life. After having been presented to the Geode of Paris, it was screened at a number of international Festivals and art forums and has been studied by critics and researchers.

In 2012, he directed Eros, a feature documentary that tells the story of three activists from the occupied Valle Theatre who decide to leave Rome to travel around the Europe of crisis and resistances. In 2014 he founded the production company "Piroetta". Since 2015, he has also directed and produced, with the company European Alternatives, "Talk Real", a European nomadic talk show for the web.

In 2018, he produced and directed Youtopia, a feature fiction film with Matilda De Angelis, Donatella Finocchiaro and Alessandro Haber. In 2020, he created and produced the docuseries "Constitutional Circus", presented during the Venice Film Festival 2021 in the "Giornate degli autori" (Venice Days) section. In 2021, he released the documentary 'Ethos', produced in collaboration with the European Commission. He is currently making his third feature film for the cinema "Greta e le favole vere" (Greta and the true fables) with Raoul Bova, Donatella Finocchiaro, Sabrina Impacciatore and Darko Peric, produced by Pegasus and Rai Cinema.

== Filmography ==
- Shooting Silvio (2006)
- Vola Vola (2010)
- Youtopia (2018)
