= Sugar Baby (film) =

2018 Italian drama film

Youtopia
- Film poster
- Directed by: Berardo Carboni
- Written by: Berardo Carboni; Dino Giarrusso; Marco Antonio Berardi; Marco Greganti; Aliosha Massine
- Starring: Matilda De Angelis; Donatella Finocchiaro; Alessandro Haber
- Cinematography: Alberto Marchiori
- Edited by: Marco Spoletini
- Music by: Plaid
- Release date: 25 April 2018
- Running time: 92 minutes
- Country: Italy
- Language: Italian

Youtopia (also marketed as Sugar Baby) is a 2018 Italian drama film directed by Berardo Carboni. Written by Marco Antonio Berard, Berardo Carboni and Dino Giarrusso.

== Synopsis ==
Youtopia is the story of a young woman who decides to sell her virginity to pay the debts of her mother, and of the man who decides to buy it. It's a bildungsroman in which the protagonist discovers new worlds and new feelings.

== Cast ==
- Matilda De Angelis as Matilde
- Donatella Finocchiaro as Laura
- Alessandro Haber as Ernesto
- Pamela Villoresi as Fausta
- Lina Bernardi as Anna
- Federico Rosati as Riccardo
- Laura Pizzirani as Ines, a prostitute
- Giulia Anchisi as a prostitute
- Claudio Botosso as the lawyer
- Luca Lionello as don Fulvio
- Paolo Sassanelli as Roberto De Galitis
- Antoine Olivier Pilon as Hiro
- Maria Laura Moraci as Francesca, a friend of Matilde
- Demetra Bellina as a friend of Matilde
- Guglielmo Poggi as Leo
