= Fuori =

2025 film by Mario Martone

- Italian theatrical release poster
- Directed by: Mario Martone
- Screenplay by: Mario Martone; Ippolita Di Majo
- Based on: L'università di Rebibbia by Goliarda Sapienza
- Starring: Valeria Golino; Matilda De Angelis; Elodie; Corrado Fortuna
- Cinematography: Paolo Carnera
- Edited by: Jacopo Quadri
- Music by: Valerio Vigliar
- Production companies: Indigo Film; The Apartment Pictures; SRAB Films; Rai Cinema
- Distributed by: 01 Distribution (Italy); Le Pacte (France)
- Release dates: 20 May 2025 (Cannes); 22 May 2025 (Italy); 3 December 2025 (France)
- Running time: 115 minutes
- Countries: Italy; France
- Language: Italian

Fuori (transl. Outside) is a 2025 biographical drama film co-written and directed by Mario Martone, based on the 1983 novel L'università di Rebibbia by Goliarda Sapienza. It stars Valeria Golino as Sapienza, alongside Matilda De Angelis, Elodie, Corrado Fortuna, Stefano Dionisi and Antonio Gerardi.

The film had its world premiere in the main competition of the 78th Cannes Film Festival on 20 May 2025, and was theatrically released in Italy by 01 Distribution on 22 May 2025.

== Premise ==
In 1980, writer Goliarda Sapienza is arrested for theft, and meets two young inmates in prison. Following their release, the three women form a deep bond.

== Cast ==
- Valeria Golino as Goliarda Sapienza
- Matilda De Angelis as Roberta
- Elodie as Barbara
- Corrado Fortuna as Angelo Pellegrino
- Stefano Dionisi as Valerio
- Antonio Gerardi as Albert
- Francesco Gheghi as Waiter at the train station café
- Daphne Scoccia as "James Dean"
- Carolina Rosi as the friend who is robbed
- Francesco Siciliano as publisher
- Sonia Zhou as Suzie Wong
- Ondina Quadri as Prison Officer
- Paola Pace as Pizzi
- Luisa De Santis as Trasteverina

== Production ==
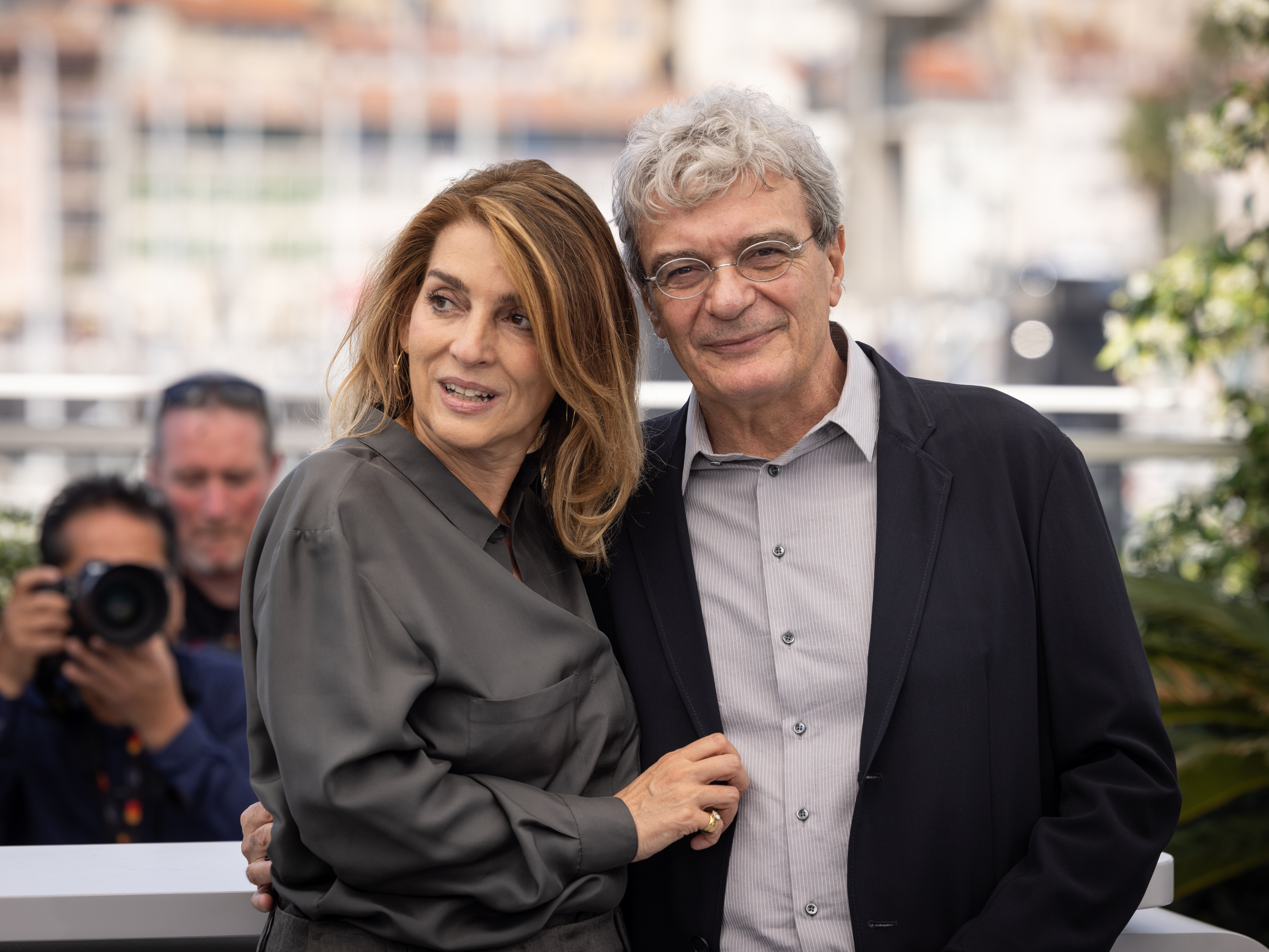
Co-writers Ippolita Di Majo and Mario Martone

In March 2024, director Mario Martone announced that his next film would be about Goliarda Sapienza. Principal photography began in Rome in June 2024. Filming also took place in Fregenae and Maccarese.

== Release ==
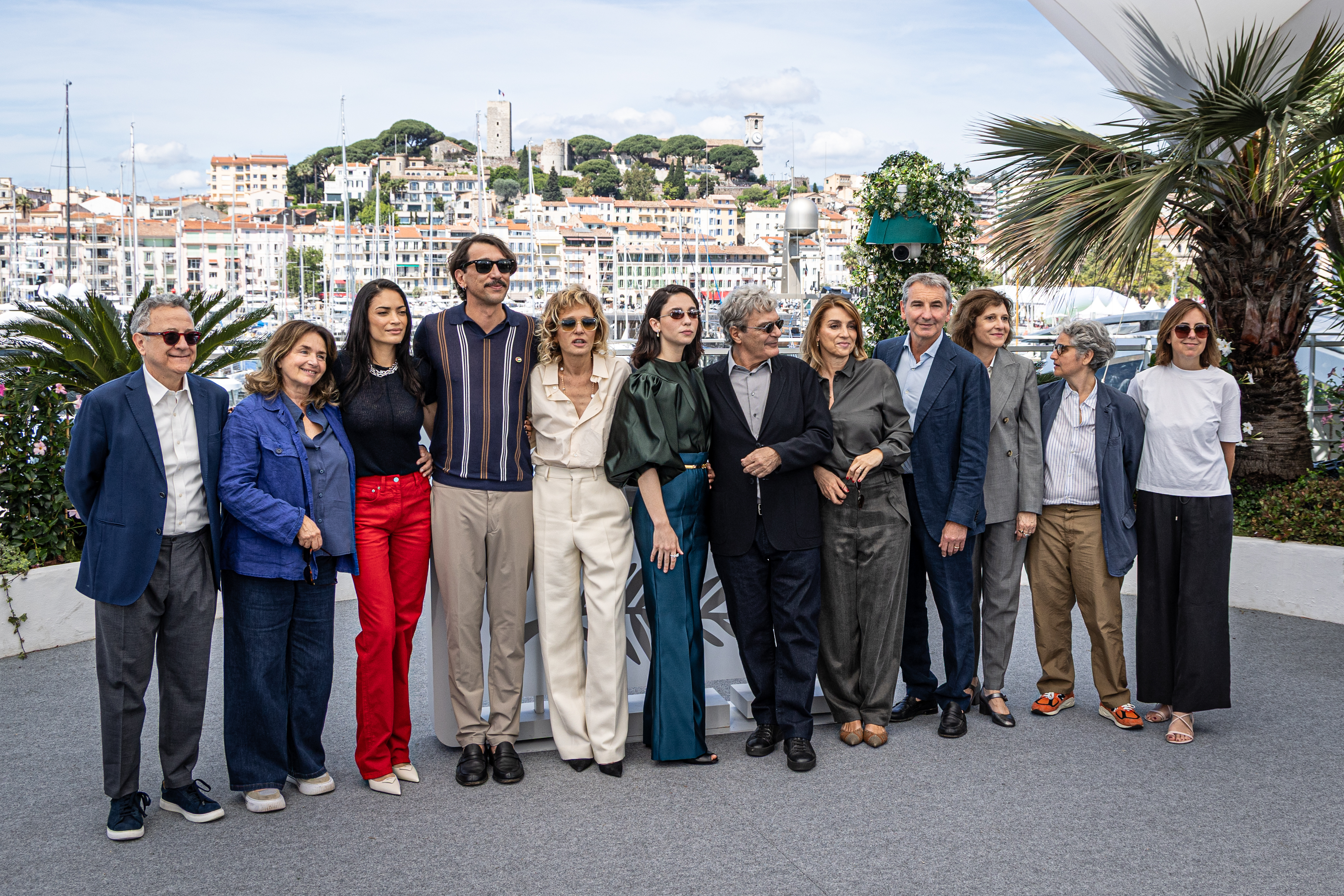
Mario Martone and the cast of the film at the 2025 Cannes Film Festival

The first promotional stills were released on 3 December 2024, while a promotional clip was released on 10 April 2025. The film will be distributed by 01 Distribution in Italy, while Goodfellas owns the international sales rights to the film. It had its world premiere in competition at the 78th Cannes Film Festival on 20 May 2025, and was theatrically released in Italy on 22 May 2025. It was theatrically released in France by Le Pacte on 3 December 2025.

== Reception ==
On the review aggregator website Rotten Tomatoes, 58% of 12 critics' reviews are positive, with an average rating of 6.2/10. Metacritic, which uses a weighted average, assigned the film a score of 47 out of 100, based on 5 critics, indicating "mixed or average" reviews.

Damon Wise of Deadline wrote, "The ending, then, is a little disappointing, since it involves a little twist that, if she really was paying so much close attention, [Goliarda] Sapienza would have seen coming. Nevertheless, the film’s central premise is refreshing." Guy Lodge of Variety called the film "repetitive, tediously non-linear" and "restless, darting". He commended the performance of Matilda De Angelis, however, writing, "De Angelis is electric as the capricious, self-destructive Roberta, even if the character herself isn’t very substantively written, and the film's very pulse quickens whenever she enters the frame." Lee Marshall of Screen Daily also noted the film's non-linear structure, writing that "the temporal leaps don't distract from the fact that the plot is threadbare in places".

=== Accolades ===
Award	Year	Category	Recipient(s)	Result	Ref.
Cannes Film Festival	2025	Palme d'Or	Mario Martone	Nominated	
Nastri d'Argento	2025	Best Film	Fuori	Nominated	
Nastri d'Argento	2025	Best Director	Mario Martone	Nominated	
Nastri d'Argento	2025	Best Screenplay	Mario Martone, Ippolita Di Majo	Nominated	
Nastri d'Argento	2025	Best Actress	Valeria Golino	Won	
Nastri d'Argento	2025	Best Supporting Actress	Matilda De Angelis	Won	
Nastri d'Argento	2025	Best Supporting Actress	Elodie	Won	
Nastri d'Argento	2025	Best Casting Director	Paola Rota, Raffaele Di Florio	Nominated	
Nastri d'Argento	2025	Best Cinematography	Paolo Carnera	Nominated	
Nastri d'Argento	2025	Best Production Design	Carmine Guarino	Nominated	
Nastri d'Argento	2025	Best Editing	Jacopo Quadri	Nominated	
Nastri d'Argento	2025	Best Sound	Maricetta Lombardo	Nominated	
David di Donatello	2026	Best Film	Fuori	Nominated	
David di Donatello	2026	Best Director	Mario Martone	Nominated	
David di Donatello	2026	Best Adapted Screenplay	Mario Martone, Ippolita Di Majo	Nominated	
David di Donatello	2026	Best Actress	Valeria Golino	Nominated	
David di Donatello	2026	Best Supporting Actress	Matilda De Angelis	Won	
David di Donatello	2026	Best Hairstyling	Marco Perna	Nominated	
David di Donatello	2026	Best Editing	Jacopo Quadri	Nominated	
David di Donatello	2026	Best Sound	Maricetta Lombardo, Silvia Moreas, Piergiorgio De Luca, Giancarlo Rutigliano	Nominated	
