= The Prize (2017 film) =

- Directed by: Alessandro Gassman
- Written by: Alessandro Gassmann, Walter Lupo, Massimiliano Bruno
- Produced by: Fulvio Lucisano, Federica Lucisano
- Starring: Gigi Proietti; Alessandro Gassmann; Anna Foglietta; Rocco Papaleo; Matilda De Angelis; Marco Zitelli
- Cinematography: Federico Schlatter
- Music by: Maurizio Filardo
- Production company: MG Italian International Film
- Distributed by: Vision Distribution Italia
- Release date: 6 December 2017
- Running time: 100 minutes
- Country: Italy
- Language: Italian

The Prize (Il premio) is a 2017 Italian film directed by Alessandro Gassman.

== Plot ==
Giovanni Passamonte, a writer, is awarded the Nobel Prize for Literature. He is about to embark on a one-week road trip to Stockholm to receive the prize when his personal assistant, Rinaldo, injures his back and can no longer drive him there. His son Oreste, a personal trainer who had arrived that morning to crash at his father's place after an argument with his wife Barbara, is recruited to replace Rinaldo. Lucrezia, Giovanni's daughter by another woman, invites herself to the trip to document it as part of her online blog.

The trip becomes a turning point for the four characters: Giovanni is nostalgic and lamenting a lack of inspiration. He is secretly planning a big surprise at the award ceremony (but ultimately changes his mind) and decides to interfere and improve the lives of his three companions. His eccentricity is the cause of the trip and often results in comedic moments throughout the movie. He is afraid of flying (hence the road trip), doesn't like using credit card (Rinaldo carries more than 50,000 EUR in cash for any emergency), has had many love stories, some of which have produced children (at least 6).

Oreste is a former Olympic athlete turned personal trainer and owner of an ailing gym, too proud to ask his father for financial help, but willing to drive for him in exchange for a 15,000 EUR loan. Lucrezia is a neurotic blogger with the passion for art and literature. Rinaldo is a loyal assistant who has sacrificed much for Giovanni, including his only love interest. The trip offers Giovanni occasions to shake things up in the life of their companions and make them reflect on their story and identity. The movie ends with Giovanni's acceptance speech where he declares the insignificance of prizes in general and the importance of the people "off-stage", who lead regular lives.

== Cast ==
- Gigi Proietti as Giovanni Passamonte (Il maestro)
- Alessandro Gassman as Oreste Passamonte, eldest son of Giovanni
- Rocco Papaleo as Rinaldo Citelli, Giovanni's personal assistant
- Anna Foglietta as Lucrezia Passamonte, Giovanni's daughter
- Marco Zitelli as Andrea Passamonte, Oreste's son
- Matilda De Angelis as Britta, Andrea's love interest
- Erika Blanc as Greta, an aging actress
- Andrea Jonasson as Melissa
- Eugenia Tempesta as Megumi
- Kai Portman as Kurt, an Austrian border officer
- Elda Alvigini as Barbara, Oreste's wife
