= Rose Island (film) =

2020 Italian biopigraphical film

- Film poster
- Italian: L'incredibile storia dell'Isola delle Rose
- Directed by: Sydney Sibilia
- Written by: Sydney Sibilia; Francesca Manieri
- Produced by: Matteo Rovere
- Starring: Elio Germano; Matilda De Angelis; Leonardo Lidi; Fabrizio Bentivoglio; Luca Zingaretti; François Cluzet
- Cinematography: Valerio Azzali
- Edited by: Gianni Vezzosi
- Music by: Michele Braga
- Production company: Groenlandia
- Distributed by: Netflix
- Release date: 9 December 2020
- Running time: 117 minutes
- Country: Italy
- Language: Italian

Rose Island (Italian: L'incredibile storia dell'Isola delle Rose, transl. The Incredible Story of Rose Island) is a 2020 Italian biographical adventure film directed by Sydney Sibilia and starring Elio Germano. The film is based on the true story of engineer Giorgio Rosa and the Republic of Rose Island, an artificial platform, which became a micronation on May 1, 1968, and was demolished in February 1969.

It was released on Netflix on 9 December 2020.

== Plot ==
Giorgio Rosa approaches the Council of Europe with a petition to protect and recognize his Island, which he later elaborates was built by him and his friend Maurizio Orlandini. The film flashes back to 1968 to show how after passing the state engineering exam, he met with his ex-girlfriend, Gabriella, in Bologna. While he drives them home, they are stopped by police because his homemade car lacks license plates. They also discover it was never registered. He is jailed for the night and bailed out by his father. Gabriella is fingerprinted, but not charged, and thus later must deal with having a mark on her record.

Three months later, he is working for motorbike racer Bruno Spaggiari as an engineer when he sees a billboard showing an oil platform. Inspired, he convinces Maurizio who is tired of working in his father's company, to help him build an island just outside the territorial waters and, thus, the legal jurisdiction of Italy, where everyone is free to do as they want. With the money that Maurizio has stolen from his father and innovative engineering solutions that drastically reduce the cost of materials, they successfully build an island of their own with a supply of fresh water. A cast-away welder with his boat asks for shelter during a storm and becomes the first resident.

Club promoter Wolfgang Rudy Neumann visits the island. He is a stateless man of German origin and PR manager at a Rimini beach club. He starts to promote the island as a tourist destination and more people begin to visit, attracted by the freedom it represents from the established states. Franca, a 19-year-old pregnant woman, offers to become the barmaid of the 400-square-meter island's sole bar. Gabriella, who had come to the island to tell Giorgio of her pending marriage, claims that it's not a nation, and is nothing more than a disco. Giorgio argues that the island, now named Rose Island, has its own language, currency, postal system, and other amenities including a citizenship process that is soon to be started. Gabriella points out that there is no official recognition of it.

A letter is written to the United Nations Headquarters in New York, which contacts the Italian government. As the island's president, Giorgio is pressured by the government to relinquish control. He refuses. In retaliation, the Italian authorities arrange for his father to be fired from his job. Other members of the island are also made offers to leave, which they accept. Gabriella advises Giorgio to approach the Council of Europe for help and accepts his case for further investigation. The Italian government threatens to destroy the island. When Giorgio refuses to back down, the other residents return and stand with him on the island against the Italian navy. They are detained and the island is blown up. The film ends with Gabriella and Giorgio getting back together. History notes Rose Island was, despite its short life, subject to a landmark event of being the only nation to be directly attacked by the Italian Republic. To prevent similar incidents from occurring in the future, the UN extended the international waters territory from 6 to 12 nautical miles.

== Cast ==
- Elio Germano as Giorgio Rosa
- Matilda De Angelis as Gabriella
- Leonardo Lidi as Maurizio Orlandini
- Fabrizio Bentivoglio as Franco Restivo
- Luca Zingaretti as Giovanni Leone
- François Cluzet as Jean Baptiste Toma
- Tom Wlaschiha as Wolfgang Rudy Neumann
- Alberto Astorri as Pietro Bernardini
- Violetta Zironi as Franca
- Andrea Pennacchi as Ulisse Rosa
- Fabrizio Rongione as monsieur Carlozzi
- Teco Celio as the doorkeeper
- Giulio Farnese as Cardinal Emanuele Nunziante
- Federico Pacifici as the Admiral
- Ascanio Balbo as Carlo
- Riccardo Marzi as Giacinto Piazza
- Marco Pancrazi as Bruno Spaggiari
- Luca Della Bianca as Francesco Cossiga
- Marco Sincini as Giulio Andreotti
- Bruno Gouery as Council of Europe Secretary

== Production ==
=== Filming ===
The film was shot in Bologna, Rimini, Riccione, Rome, Aosta Valley, Anzio, and Malta, where the island scenes were filmed.

=== Promotion ===
The first trailer of the film was released on October 27, 2020, alongside the first poster.

== Reception ==
Rose Island received generally positive reviews from critics. On the review aggregator website Rotten Tomatoes, 75% of 8 critics' reviews are positive, with an average rating of 5.9/10.

Linda Marric of NME wrote: "Sibilia and co-writer Francesca Manieri successfully mix whimsy and pathos to give us something truly inspiring."

== See also ==
- Republic of Rose Island
