= Divine (2020 film) =

2020 German-Italian comedy film

- Theatrical release poster
- German: Der göttliche Andere
- Directed by: Jan Schomburg
- Written by: Jan Schomburg
- Produced by: Stefan Arndt; Uwe Schott; Jorgo Narjes; Carlo Macchitella
- Starring: Callum Turner; Matilda De Angelis
- Cinematography: Florian Hoffmeister
- Edited by: Andrea Mertens
- Music by: Bonaparte
- Production companies: Warner Bros. Film Productions Germany; X-Filme Creative Pool
- Distributed by: Warner Bros. Pictures
- Release date: 13 August 2020 (Germany)
- Running time: 91 minutes
- Countries: Germany; Italy
- Languages: English; Italian

Divine (German: Der göttliche Andere) is a 2020 German-Italian romantic comedy film directed by Jan Schomburg.

== Plot ==
The plot follows Gregor Spring, a television reporter who travels to Italy to cover the upcoming election of the new Pope. While in the beautiful Vatican City, he falls for Maria, who is set to become a nun in just a few days. As the two grow closer, strange events happen to Gregor and he begins to think even God himself is trying to keep them apart.

== Cast ==
- Callum Turner as Gregory
- Matilda De Angelis as Maria
- Anna Bonaiuto as Teodora
- Mark Davison as Robert
- Gianni Meurer as the chief physician
- Barbara Ricci as the nurse
- Juliane Elting as Grazie Oscura
- Eddie Osei as the Pope
- Lewis Hart as Ian
- Serra Yilmaz as the taxi driver
- Pino Ammendola

== Production ==
Filming took place over five weeks in Rome and Cologne.
