= January 1969 =

Month of 1969

<<	January 1969					>>
Su	Mo	Tu	We	Th	Fr	Sa
			1	2	3	4
5	6	7	8	9	10	11
12	13	14	15	16	17	18
19	20	21	22	23	24	25
26	27	28	29	30	31

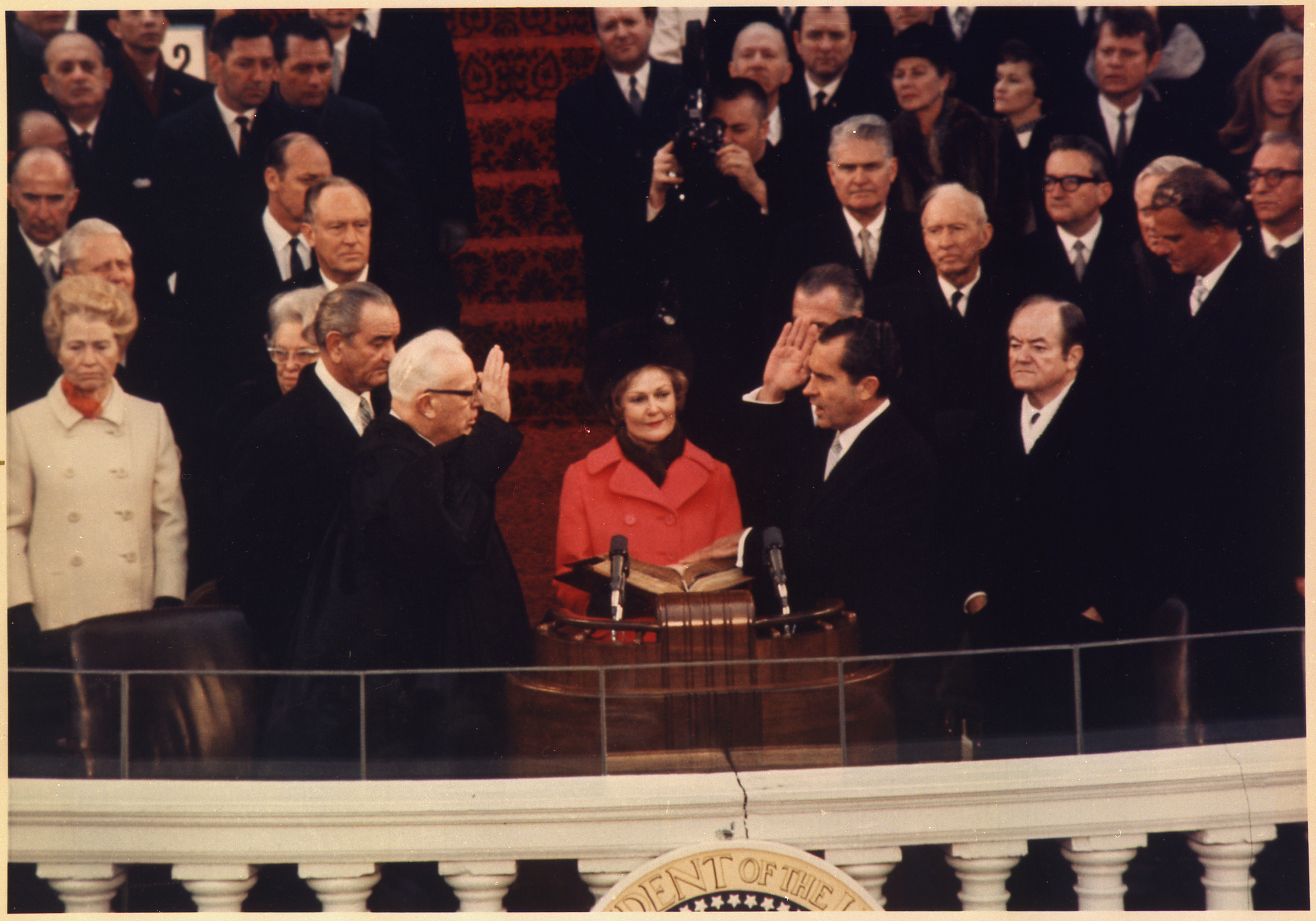
January 20, 1969: Nixon inaugurated as 37th U.S. President

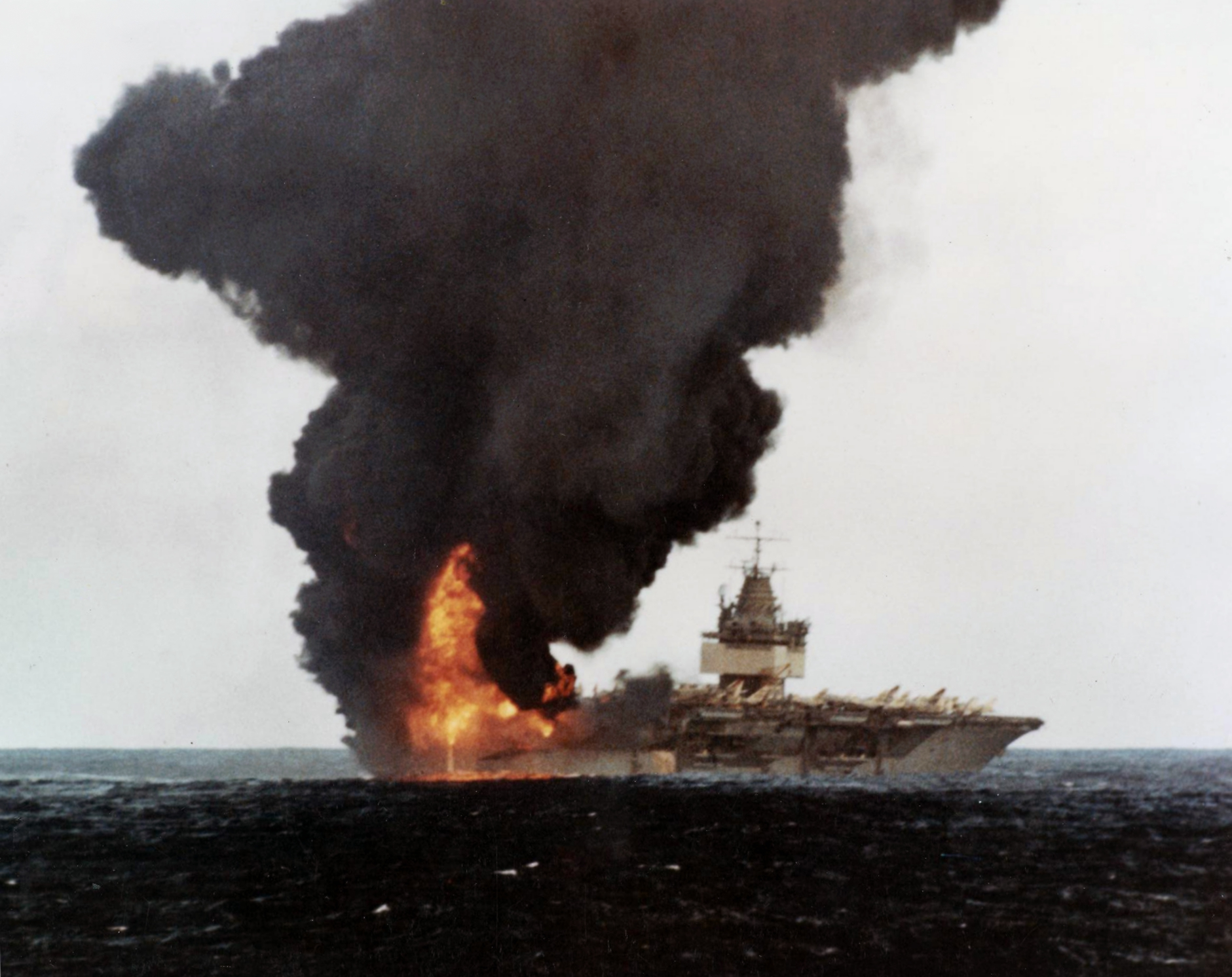
January 14, 1969: USS Enterprise blast kills 27, injures over 300

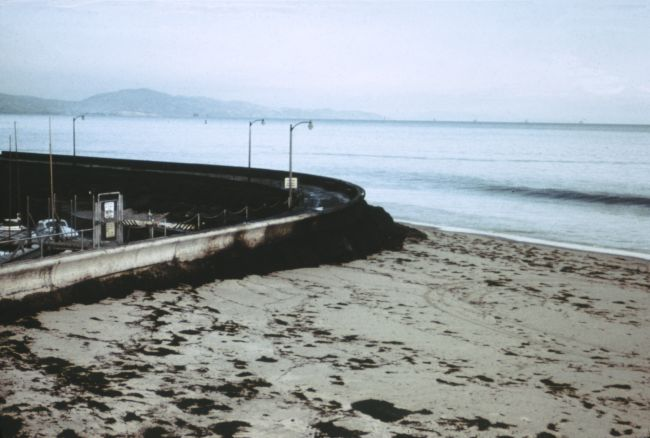
January 28, 1969: Largest oil spill to date befouls California coast

The following events occurred in January 1969:

== January 1, 1969 (Wednesday) ==
- North Vietnam released three American prisoners of war to a five-member U.S. Army team at a rice paddyfield near South Vietnam's border with Cambodia. A fourth had escaped captivity from the Viet Cong the day before. One of the POWs, Specialist 4 James Brigham of Ocala, Florida, died less than three weeks later at a Washington hospital after surgery for a brain abscess.
- The #1 ranked Ohio State Buckeyes defeated the #2 ranked USC Trojans, 27 to 16, before a crowd of 102,063 fans to win college football's Rose Bowl and the recognition by the NCAA as college football's national champion.
- Born:
  - Verne Troyer, diminutive (2'8" or 81 cm) American film actor known for portraying Mini-Me in the Austin Powers film series; in Sturgis, Michigan (d. 2018)
  - Mr. Lawrence (pen name for Douglas Lawrence Osowski), American writer and voice actor known for voicing Plankton on SpongeBob SquarePants; in East Brunswick, New Jersey
- Died: Barton MacLane, 66, American film and television actor

== January 2, 1969 (Thursday) ==
- Australian media baron Rupert Murdoch purchased the largest-selling British Sunday newspaper, The News of the World as shareholders of the News voted to accept his bid over that of British book publisher Robert Maxwell. Murdoch would purchase newspapers in the U.S. in the 1970s, notably the New York Post, and enter television in the 1980s with the founding of the Fox Network.
- The first radio reading service for the blind, The Minnesota Radio Talking Book Network, went on the air as a service of KSJR, the radio station at Saint John's University in Collegeville, Minnesota, which began broadcasting a program called "Radio Talking Book".
- The government of France announced that its office of government property would start a campaign for the sale of individual lots on the Maginot Line that had been built during the 1930s in an unsuccessful attempt to prevent a German invasion.
- China Airlines Flight 227 crashed into a mountain peak on the island of Taiwan while en route from Hualin to Kaohsiung, killing all 24 people on board.
- Born:
  - Tommy Morrison, American heavyweight boxer who held the World Boxing Organization title for four months in 1993; in Gravette, Arkansas (d. 2013)
  - Christy Turlington, American supermodel and advocate for maternal health; in Walnut Creek, California
  - Robby Gordon, American race car driver; in Los Angeles

== January 3, 1969 (Friday) ==
- The 91st United States Congress had its opening day as the U.S. Senate swore in 15 new members and 20 re-elected ones, and selected Senator Richard B. Russell of Georgia as the new president pro-tempore. Democratic Senators voted 31–26 to choose Teddy Kennedy of Massachusetts rather than incumbent Russell B. Long of Louisiana as the majority whip, while Republicans approved Hugh Scott of Pennsylvania, 23–20, over Roman L. Hruska of Nebraska. The U.S. House of Representatives re-elected John W. McCormack of Massachusetts as Speaker of the House, and voted 251 to 160 to allow controversial Congressman Adam Clayton Powell to take his seat.
- Born: Michael Schumacher, German Formula One racecar driver and winner of seven of the 11 World Championships between 1994 and 2004; in Hürth, West Germany
- Died:
  - Commodore Cochran, 66, American swimmer and track athlete, 1922 and 1923 NCAA track champion in the 440-yard dash, and 1924 Olympic gold medalist in the 4 x 400 swim relay.
  - Howard McNear, 63, American radio and television actor, known for being "Floyd the Barber" on TV's The Andy Griffith Show and as "Doc Adams" in the radio version of Gunsmoke.
  - Gilbert Miller, 84, American theatrical producer and two time Tony Award winner known for The Cocktail Party.

== January 4, 1969 (Saturday) ==
- Two days after beginning a civil rights march from Queen's University in Belfast to the city of Derry in Northern Ireland, People's Democracy began to promote the rights of the Roman Catholic minority in the United Kingdom entity; the marchers were ambushed at the Burntollet Bridge less than six miles from their destination. As officers of the Royal Ulster Constabulary (RUC) stood by without intervening, a crowd of Protestant loyalists attacked the marchers with clubs and rocks, ending the unofficial truce between the Northern Ireland Civil Rights Association and the RUC.
- The tiny (580 square mile or 1,502 km^{2}) North African enclave of Ifni was ceded by Spain to Morocco in a treaty signed at the Moroccan capital of Rabat, subject to the expected approval by the Spanish parliament, the Cortes. On June 30, the last Spanish Governor-General, Jose Miguel Vega, would haul down the Spanish flag and the cession would be complete.
- The International Convention on the Elimination of All Forms of Racial Discrimination, opened for signature at the United Nations General Assembly on December 21, 1965, went into effect after being ratified by at least 27 nations.

== January 5, 1969 (Sunday) ==
- The Soviet Union launched Venera 5 toward Venus. A course correction maneuver would be initiated on March 14 and on May 16, 1969, the Venera 5 transmitter would be landed on the surface of Venus, sending back data until the atmospheric pressure and intense heat caused its failure 18 kilometres (11 mi) above the surface.
- Ariana Afghan Airlines Flight 701 crashed into a house on its approach to London's Gatwick Airport, killing 50 of the 62 people on board and two of the home's occupants.
- Born:
  - Marilyn Manson (stage name for Brian Hugh Warner), American lead singer of the band that shares his name; in Canton, Ohio
  - Shea Whigham, American film and cable TV actor known for Boardwalk Empire; in Tallahassee, Florida

== January 6, 1969 (Monday) ==
- Richard Nixon was officially elected President of the United States as Congress certified the results of the votes cast on December 16 of the electoral college members who had been elected by American voters on November 5. The final result was certified after both houses of Congress debated removing one of the electoral votes (where a Nixon elector voted instead for George C. Wallace) was 301 votes for Nixon, 191 for Democratic candidate Hubert Humphrey, and 46 for Wallace.
- Allegheny Airlines Flight 737 crashed on its approach to Bradford, Pennsylvania, killing 11 people on board during a multistop flight from Washington, D.C. to Detroit. The accident came less than two weeks after the fatal crash on Christmas Eve of Allegheny Airlines Flight 736, on its way to Bradford as part of the same route, killing 20 people.
- The final passenger train traversed the Waverley Line, which subsequently closed to passengers.
- Born: Norman Reedus, American cable TV actor known for The Walking Dead; in Hollywood, Florida

== January 7, 1969 (Tuesday) ==
- Trial began in the case of Sirhan Sirhan for the June 5, 1968 murder of presidential candidate Robert F. Kennedy. It would last for 15 weeks, as the jury heard testimony from 89 witnesses. After three days of deliberation, the jury found Sirhan guilty of first-degree murder and of five counts of assault with a deadly weapon. Sirhan would be sentenced to death on May 21, but all death penalty sentences in the United States would be set aside in 1972, and Sirhan is spending the rest of his life at Corcoran State Prison.

== January 8, 1969 (Wednesday) ==
- Two FBI agents, Anthony Palmisano and Edwin R. Woodriffe, were shot and killed in an apartment building in southeast Washington, D.C., while trying to apprehend Billie Austin Bryant, who had robbed the Citizens Bank in nearby Oxon Hill, Maryland. Bryant was apprehended the same day, only two hours after he was placed on the FBI Ten Most Wanted Fugitives List, the shortest amount of time between placement on the list and capture. Woodriffe was the first African-American FBI agent to die in the line of duty. The killing of him and Palmisano marked only the second time that two FBI men were killed together; the first time had been on November 27, 1934, when Herman Hollis and Samuel P. Cowley were killed by gangster Baby Face Nelson.
- Twenty-three people were burned to death in a fast-moving grass fire in Australia's Victoria state. All but six of them were motorists who were near the Geelong suburb of Lara and who had been traveling on the National Route 1, the highway that links Geelong to Melbourne.
- Died: Albert Hill, 79, British track and field athlete, 1920 Olympic gold medalist in the 800m and 1,500m races

== January 9, 1969 (Thursday) ==
- The Condon Committee, chaired by University of Colorado physicist Edward Condon, released its report Scientific Study of Unidentified Flying Objects and concluded that "nothing has come from the study of UFOs in the past 21 years that has added to scientific knowledge. Careful consideration of the record as it is available to us leads us to conclude that further extensive study of UFOs probably cannot be justified in the expectation that science will be advanced thereby." The Condon Report, commissioned by the United States Air Force at the cost of $520,000, recommended that the Air Force close its Project Blue Book investigation of UFO reports, and the USAF would do so at the end of the year.
- New York Jets quarterback Joe Namath accepted an award from the Miami Touchdown Club, three days before Super Bowl III and said in his after-dinner remarks to the crowd, "The Jets will win Sunday; I guarantee it." At the time of Namath's boast, the nine-year old American Football League had not come close to winning either of the first two Super Bowls against the 49-year-old NFL, losing by scores of 35–10 and 33–14.

== January 10, 1969 (Friday) ==
- The publishers of The Saturday Evening Post announced that the weekly magazine would cease publication after almost 148 years, discontinuing after its February 8 issue. Publisher Martin S. Ackerman said at a news conference that the Post had lost more than five million dollars in 1968 and commented that "We just could not sell enough advertising and cut expenses fast enough. Apparently, there is just not the need for our product in today's scheme of living." The Post had started publication in 1821 in Philadelphia, using the same printing shop used by the Pennsylvania Gazette, which had been founded by Benjamin Franklin. Until 1942, the magazine's masthead had carried the false claim that it was "founded in 1728 by Benjamin Franklin".
- The Soviet Union launched their second exploration vehicle toward Venus in five days, Venera 6, after the Sunday launch of Venera 5. The second probe would arrive on May 17, a day after the first one's arrival, and, like the first, would cease functioning 18 kilometres (11 mi) above the surface because of the Venusian temperature and atmospheric pressure.
- George Harrison left The Beatles. He came back one week later.

== January 11, 1969 (Saturday) ==
- U.S. Army Special Forces Reserve officer Robert Helmey used an unloaded shotgun to hijack United Airlines Flight 459 to Cuba, diverting it from its Jacksonville to Miami flight and forcing a landing in Havana. In a month with regular hijackings of U.S. flights, Helmey's case stands out because he was the first successful hijacker to be prosecuted in the United States. Immediately after he landed in Cuba, he was arrested by the Castro government and would spend 109 days in solitary confinement in a Cuban jail before being deported to Canada, which in turn would return him to American authorities on May 5. A jury would find him not guilty of all charges on November 20, accepting his defense of temporary insanity, making Helmey the first skyjacker of a commercial aircraft anywhere to be acquitted at trial.
- U.S. Army First Lieutenant Harold A. Fritz distinguished himself in combat in the Vietnam War by leading the defense of his outnumbered 28-man platoon against a larger force of North Vietnamese attackers during two successive ambush attacks. Despite being seriously wounded in the first moments of the battle, Fritz inspired his men in leading the fight until American tanks were able to come to the platoon's rescue. He would be awarded the Medal of Honor for his heroism on March 2, 1971.
- The Kingdom of Sweden became the first Western nation to grant formal diplomatic recognition to the Communist republic of North Vietnam. Although the decision by the Swedish cabinet was made on the evening of January 10 in Stockholm, January 11 is recognized as the date in Vietnam because of the six-hour time difference in Hanoi.
- Born: Kyle Richards, American actress, socialite, and television personality; in Hollywood, California

== January 12, 1969 (Sunday) ==
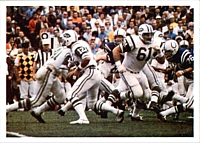
January 12, 1969: AFL Jets upset NFL Colts in Super Bowl III

- The American Football League champion New York Jets, led by brash quarterback Joe Namath, upset the National Football League champion Baltimore Colts, 16 to 7, to win Super Bowl III in Miami. Namath would later write that "The rewards and great memories for me come not only from being part of a team and a league that were overwhelmingly underdogs and winning it all, but equally because we lifted people's spirits in a very difficult time" in New York City and would add, "I have been told many times over the years that the Jets, and then the Mets and Knicks, helped people emotionally deal with all this adversity."
- The self-titled debut album of the English band Led Zeppelin, was released in the United States. The album would be released to the UK on March 31.
- Martial law was declared in Madrid, as the University of Madrid was closed and over 300 students were arrested.

== January 13, 1969 (Monday) ==
- The Beatles released the soundtrack of their 1968 film Yellow Submarine. Its A-side featured one song from a previous album, "Yellow Submarine" (from the 1966 Revolver album), a previous single "All You Need Is Love" (July 1967), as well as previously unreleased songs including "Only A Northern Song", "Hey Bulldog", and "It's All Too Much". The B-side had the orchestral track that played as background to the various scenes of the film.
- Scandinavian Airlines Flight 933 plunged into the Santa Monica Bay off of the coast of California, drowning 15 of the 45 people on board. The Douglas DC-8 jet was making its approach to Los Angeles after departing from Seattle on a flight that had originated at Copenhagen in Denmark, and was nearly seven miles off course when it descended into the sea, impacting at 7:21 p.m. local time. Thirty survivors were able to evacuate on the airplane's life rafts.
- Samsung Electronics, major brand for smartphone, television set and home appliance, founded in Suwon, South Korea.
- English rock band Led Zeppelin's self-titled debut album was released in the United States.
- Born: Stephen Hendry, Scottish professional snooker player and winner of seven world championships, including five in a row from 1992 to 1996; in South Queensferry

== January 14, 1969 (Tuesday) ==
- An explosion aboard the aircraft carrier USS Enterprise near Hawaii killed 27 U.S. Navy men and injured 314. The accident happened during operation of an aircraft engine starter unit and the placement of a cart with four Zuni rockets too close to the exhaust port of the starter unit. The hot exhaust detonated one of the Zuni warheads, and the explosion sent shards of metal into the fuel tank of the F-4 Phantom that was being prepared for takeoff; the tank then exploded, causing a fire that ignited the other three Zuni rockets and then causing a chain reaction that set off other bombs and rockets as burning fuel spilled from the flight deck to the hangar deck.
- The Soviet Union launched Soyuz 4, with cosmonaut Vladimir Shatalov, at 1:39 in the afternoon (07:39 UTC) from the Baikonur Space Center. For the first time since the Soviet space program had started, film of a rocket was shown on Soviet Union television on the same day that it happened. A video of Shatalov boarding the rocket, along with the last five minutes of the countdown, and the liftoff, was telecast within 90 minutes.
- American spy Morton Sobell was released from federal prison after serving 17 years of a 30-year sentence for conspiracy to sell atomic bomb secrets to the Soviet Union. Incarcerated since 1951, Sobell was ordered freed from the United States penitentiary in Lewisburg, Pennsylvania, by order of the United States Court of Appeals in New York.
- British train robber Bruce Reynolds, the mastermind of the "Great Train Robbery" of August 8, 1963, was sentenced to 25 years in prison by a court in Aylesbury as part of plea bargain.
- India's Madras State was formally renamed as Tamil Nadu.
- Born:
  - Dave Grohl, American rock musician who founded the Foo Fighters after departing Nirvana; in Warren, Ohio
  - Jason Bateman, American TV and film actor; in Rye, New York

== January 15, 1969 (Wednesday) ==
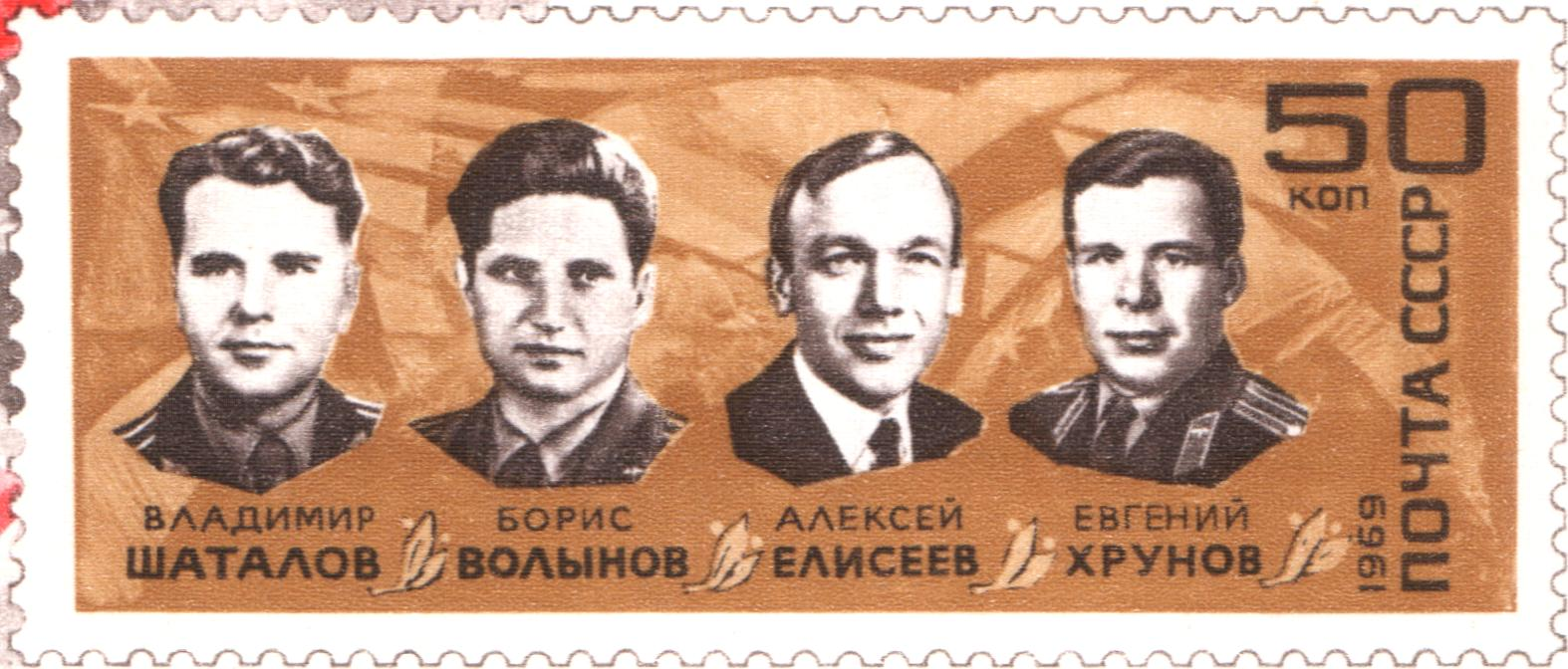
Shatalov, Volynov, Yeliseyev and Khrunov

- The Soviet Union launched Soyuz 5, the first Soyuz spacecraft with a three-cosmonaut crew, from Baikonur at 1:14 p.m., with the goal of docking in orbit with Soyuz 4, launched the previous day. On board the second Soyuz were Boris V. Volynov, Aleksei S. Yeliseyev and Yevgeny V. Khrunov. The two ships docked the next day and made the first transfer ever of a Soviet cosmonaut from one craft to another as Khrunov and Yeliseyev joined Vladimir Shatalov on Soyuz 4.
- NASA reported that considerable progress had been made during the underwater test program begun at Marshall Space Flight Center (MSFC)'s Neutral Buoyancy Simulator several years earlier. The program was providing information essential for design of the first U.S. space station. Technicians, design engineers, and professional divers in space suits and scuba gear were conducting tasks similar to those necessary to activate an orbiting Workshop, in a 5300-cu-m (1.4-million-gal) tank containing mockups of the Apollo Applications Program (AAP) cluster elements (Workshop, Apollo telescope mount, solar observatory, and airlock and multiple docking adapter), simulating weightlessness of space. Conclusions from the tests would be reflected in the Workshop's final design, with a decision expected in May 1969.

== January 16, 1969 (Thursday) ==
- The southern African nation of Zambia converted to decimalisation of its currency, replacing the Zambian pound (worth 20 Zambian shillings or 240 Zambian pence) with the Kwacha, subdivided into 100 ngwee. The initial rate of exchange of old currency for new was 1.7094 kwacha for one Zambian pound, which was initially pegged to one British pound sterling.
- The fastest train in the United States up to that time, Penn Central's Metroliner, inaugurated service between Union Station in Washington, D.C. and the Penn Station in New York City, making the 225 miles (362 km) journey at speeds of up to 110 miles per hour (180 km/h).
- Student Jan Palach set himself on fire in Prague's Wenceslas Square to protest the Soviet invasion of Czechoslovakia. He would die of his injuries three days later. Palach's death disturbed Czechoslovaks and triggered nationwide student protests against the occupation.
- Born:
  - Roy Jones Jr., American professional boxer with championships at four weight classes (1993–94 IBF middleweight title, 1994–96 IBF super middleweight, 1999 WBC, WBA and IBF light heavyweight, and 2003 WBA heavyweight); in Pensacola, Florida
  - Dead (stage name for Per Yngve "Pelle" Ohlin), Swedish heavy metal musician best known as the lead vocalist and lyricist of the Norwegian black metal band Mayhem; in Västerhaninge (committed suicide, 1991)

== January 17, 1969 (Friday) ==
- For the first time in the history of human spaceflight, space travelers returned to Earth in a different spacecraft than the one that they had departed upon. While American crews had performed the first docking of spaceships, the Gemini astronauts had always come back in the same vehicle that they had started with. Alexei Yeliseyev and Yevgeny V. Khrunov, sent up on Soyuz 5, landed safely (along with Vladimir Shatalov) in Soyuz 4 in the Kazahk SSR, about 25 miles (40 km) northwest of Karaganda (now Qaraghandy in the Republic of Kazakhstan).
- The U.S. Department of Justice filed an antitrust lawsuit against International Business Machines Corporation (IBM), charging the company with monopolizing the digital computer industry, programming hindering competitors and limiting the development of computer programming by its policy of selling its hardware, software and technical support as an inseparable package. The suit would continue until 1982, when it would be dropped because of changes in the industry.
- Born:
  - Tiësto (stage name for Tijs Michiel Verwest), Netherlands-born DJ and record producer, regarded by many sources as the "Godfather of EDM"; in Breda
  - Lukas Moodysson, Swedish novelist and film director; in Lund

== January 18, 1969 (Saturday) ==
- The parties to the Paris Peace Talks came to an agreement on the shape of the conference tables and the placement of the representatives who were negotiating an end to the Vietnam War. After being delayed for nearly six weeks over procedural disagreements raised by South Vietnam's Nguyen Cao Ky, the parties came to an accord that "The two sides would be 'clearly separated' by two rectangular tables with a round one in the middle" and that the tables would have "no nameplates, no flags and no written minutes of the understanding" on the setup. Substantive talks would not begin until a week later, after the inauguration of President Nixon. Lyndon B. Johnson, whose term as U.S. president would expire two days after the agreement on the tables, would write later that "I regretted more than anyone could possibly know that I was leaving the White House without having achieved a just, honorable, and a lasting peace in Vietnam."
- Failure of Soviet spacecraft Soyuz 5's service module to separate correctly caused a near-fatal re-entry but the module made a hard landing in the Ural Mountains. The accident would not be publicly acknowledged until 1997.
- The University of Tennessee women's basketball team, which would win the second highest number of NCAA championships— eight— in its later years (1987, 1989, 1991, 1996, 1997, 1998, 2007 and 2008) played its first game since 1926, losing to Western Carolina University, 46 to 77, at Cullowhee, North Carolina.
- Born:
  - Jesse L. Martin (stage name for Jesse Lamont Watkins), African-American stage (Rent) and TV (Law & Order, The Flash) actor; in Rocky Mount, Virginia
  - Dave Bautista, American professional wrestler and mixed martial artist; in Washington, D.C.

== January 19, 1969 (Sunday) ==
- In the third major plane crash in the U.S. in two weeks, United Airlines Flight 266 crashed into the Pacific Ocean shortly after takeoff from Los Angeles, killing all 38 people on board. A minute before the 6:21 p.m. crash, the captain reported that he had an engine fire and was attempting to return the Boeing 727 to the airport. The plane plunged into the sea about a mile from the crash of SAS Flight 933 less than a week earlier.
- The Israeli Labor Party (Mifleget HaAvoda HaYisrelit, commonly shortened to HaAvoda) was created by the merger of the Labor Alignment (a 1965 combination of Mapai and Ahdut HaAvoda also known as the United Labor Party or ULP) and Rafi.
- Born: Junior Seau (Tiaina Baul Seau Jr.), American NFL linebacker and Pro Football Hall of Fame inductee; in Oceanside, California (committed suicide, 2012)

== January 20, 1969 (Monday) ==
- Following six weeks of familiarization with the Orbital Workshop (OWS), NASA astronaut R. Walter Cunningham made a number of recommendations for modification of its interior. Among these were discontinuance of hardware development conceived to support the concept of compression walking; elimination of a settee from the food management compartment; discontinuance of any consideration of a cot for zero-g sleep stations; simplification of fire extinguisher brackets; and discontinuance of development of a cargo transfer device in the OWS and airlock module (AM).
- Richard Nixon was sworn in as the 37th President of the United States.
- Born: Patrick K. Kroupa, American computer hacker who went by the name "Lord Digital"; in Los Angeles

== January 21, 1969 (Tuesday) ==
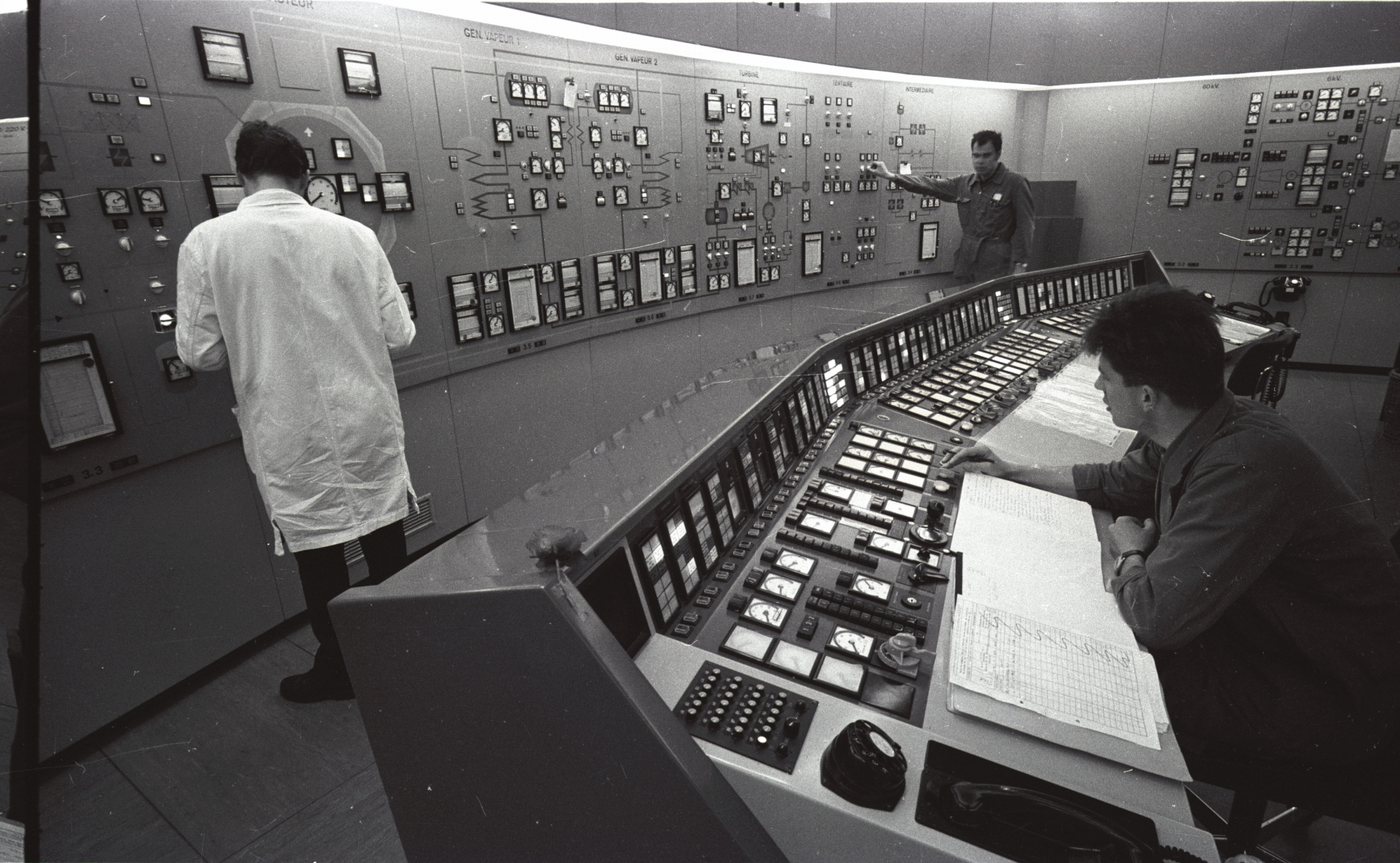
Lucens reactor control room in 1968

- A partial nuclear meltdown at the Lucens nuclear reactor, located in Switzerland near the town of the same name, happened after the reactor core suffered a loss-of-coolant accident. In what is now rated as an International Nuclear Event Scale (INES) Level 4 incident, the cavern in which the reactor was housed sustained massive radioactive contamination but the surrounding area was not irradiated and the cavern was sealed off.
- Jury selection began in New Orleans on the opening day of the first and only trial of a person accused of conspiracy in the assassination of U.S. President John F. Kennedy, as District Attorney Jim Garrison went forward with proceedings that followed the indictment of retired New Orleans businessman Clay Shaw. A jury would find Shaw not guilty on all charges on March 1.

== January 22, 1969 (Wednesday) ==
- An assassination attempt was carried out on Leonid Brezhnev by deserter Viktor Ilyin during a motorcade in Moscow for the four cosmonauts of Soyuz 4 and Soyuz 5. Brezhnev and Soviet head of state Nikolai V. Podgorny were riding inside a closed limousine, several cars behind the cosmonauts vehicle, and the shots were fired as the procession approached the Kremlin's Borovitsky Gate. The incident wasn't reported in the Soviet press, and western reporters only learned of it 24 hours later when a Foreign Ministry spokesman confirmed the rumors. One person was killed, several were injured. Brezhnev escaped unharmed.
- Denny McLain of the Detroit Tigers, the last man to win 30 games in a Major League Baseball season was named the Associated Press Male Athlete of the Year.
- The United States launched Orbiting Solar Observatory (OSO) 5 at 11:48 a.m. to study solar flares.

== January 23, 1969 (Thursday) ==
- Eugen Gerstenmaier, President of West Germany's Bundestag and second only to Chancellor Kurt Georg Kiesinger, announced his resignation after the media and rival legislators rejected his claims that he had been a resistance fighter against Adolf Hitler during the World War II.
- A rare, midwinter tornado, killed 29 people as it passed through the predominantly-black town of Hazlehurst, Mississippi at 6:25 in the morning. Most of the victims were African-American.

== January 24, 1969 (Friday) ==
- Spain's President Francisco Franco decreed a three-month state of emergency and suspended five civil rights, allowing police to search without a warrant, hold prisoners indefinitely without charges, prevent public assemblies and to exile dissidents (particularly Basque activists and non-resident students) to their home provinces. Censorship of all publications, lifted on April 9, 1966, was put into effect the next day.

== January 25, 1969 (Saturday) ==
- On the third day of nine consecutive days of heavy rainfall in southern California, mudslides killed nine people in their homes north of Los Angeles in a single day. The final death toll would be 95 people (including 57 rain related traffic accidents, 18 drownings and 15 mudslides), and $138,000,000 in damage (roughly $975 million a half century later) in the Los Angeles metropolitan area.
- The Vatican issued Comme le prévoit, a directive on guidelines for translation of the Latin liturgy into local languages in accordance with previous papal directives in Sacrosanctum concilium.
- NR-1, the smallest nuclear submarine ever put into operation and the only nuclear-powered sub for research rather than military use, was launched from Groton, Connecticut.
- The funeral of Jan Palach was conducted in Prague and was the occasion for thousands of people to take action to protest the continued Soviet occupation of Czechoslovakia.
- Died: Irene Castle, 75, American Broadway dancer who combined with her husband for the team of Vernon and Irene Castle

== January 26, 1969 (Sunday) ==
- Elvis Presley stepped into American Studios in Memphis, Tennessee, recording "Long Black Limousine", thus beginning the recording of what would become his landmark comeback sessions for the albums From Elvis in Memphis and Back in Memphis. The sessions yielded the popular and critically acclaimed singles "Suspicious Minds", "In the Ghetto", and "Kentucky Rain".
- Thirteen people were killed in an early morning fire at the stately Victoria Hotel in Dunnville, Ontario.
- Died: Edwin T. Pratt, 38, African-American civic leader and executive director of the Seattle Urban League, was shot and killed by a shotgun blast as he stepped out of his home in Shoreline, Washington.

== January 27, 1969 (Monday) ==
- A meeting to discuss the feasibility of space stations as the major post-Apollo human spaceflight program was held at NASA Headquarters. Edgar M. Cortright, Director of Langley Research Center (LaRC), commented that the 1975 launch date would preclude major advances in technology at the outset of the core space station; a regenerative life support system would be needed for minimum resupply; replaceable rather than expendable units would require a new philosophy; and overly advanced missions should be avoided at the outset. Abe Silverstein, Director of Lewis Research Center, commented that NASA must do initial homework on size, weight, orbits, programs and experiments, logistic support, power, and communications. These factors would all need to be defined. Wernher von Braun, Director of MSFC, commented that NASA should spell out the sciences, technology, applications, missions, and research desired, and that NASA should define a 1975 station as a core facility from which the ultimate space base could grow in an efficient orderly evolution through 1985. Robert R. Gilruth, Director of Manned Spacecraft Center (MSC), commented that NASA should be looking at a step comparable in challenge to that of Apollo after Mercury; that design should emphasize the utility of the space base as a waystation to the Moon and Mars; that cargo and passenger transfer without extravehicular activity should be available; and that the logistics vehicle support system should be decoupled from the station-building launch capability at the outset. George E. Mueller, Associate Administrator for Manned Space Flight, commented that perhaps the logistics shuttle system should be developed first, before space station characteristics were decided on. James C. Elms, Director, Electronics Research Center, commented, "We should design for artificial gravity and maybe later use the space station without it. You can easily decide to stop something you decided to spin, but it's a diode: you can't later decide to spin something you didn't design to spin."
- Fourteen men, 9 of them Jews, were executed in Iraq for spying for Israel. Eleven of the men were hanged at Liberation Square in Baghdad. Afterwards, their bodies, "each wrapped with a white poster bearing the text of the death sentence", were "removed from the gallows and hung up on a gate overlooking the square" for public display, where they were viewed by what state radio referred to as "200,000 jubilant Iraqis"; the other three were hanged at Basra. On February 20, Iraq would hang seven men convicted of spying for Israel, all of them Iraqi Muslims, and display their bodies at Liberation Square.
- Reverend Ian Paisley, Northern Irish Unionist leader and founder of the Free Presbyterian Church of Ulster, was jailed for three months for illegal assembly.
- Born: Patton Oswalt, American television and film actor and writer, winner of an Emmy Award and a Grammy Award; in Portsmouth, Virginia
- Died:
  - Anukulchandra Chakravarty, 80, Bengali Indian guru and philosopher
  - Charles Winninger, 84, American stage and film comedian

== January 28, 1969 (Tuesday) ==
- The largest oil spill in U.S. history, up to that time, took place 5.5 miles (8.9 km) off of the coast of Santa Barbara, California during the drilling of the ocean floor by Union Oil from its Platform A offshore rig. Well Number A-21 had reached a depth of 3,479 feet (1,060 m) when, at 10:45 in the morning, the trouble began with a blowout when the drill pipe was removed from the hole. For the next 11 days before the well was capped, between 80,000 and 100,000 barrels (13,000 and 16,000 m^{3}) of crude oil 336,000 to 420,000 US gallons (1,270,000 to 1,590,000 L; 280,000 to 350,000 imp gal) would be released and an 800-square-mile (2,100 km^{2}) oil slick was created on the ocean and 30 miles (48 km) of beaches. In 1989, its magnitude would be exceeded by the Exxon Valdez spill. The incident would inspire Wisconsin Senator Gaylord Nelson to organize the first Earth Day in 1970.
- Born:
  - Kathryn Morris, American TV actress, best known for her lead role as Detective Lilly Rush in the CBS series Cold Case; in Cincinnati
  - Mo Rocca (Maurice Rocca), American TV and radio host; in Washington, D.C.

== January 29, 1969 (Wednesday) ==
- In the longest-lasting and destructive cases in Canadian history of student protesters occupying a college building, a crowd of 500 black and white students took control of the ninth floor of the Hall Building and the computer center at Sir George Williams University in Montreal. What is now known as the "Sir George Williams affair" began on the fourth day of anger over the university's handling of allegations of racism against one of the professors; though it started peacefully, the occupation would not end until February 11, with the a fire that would destroy the computers and cause one million dollars of damage. Eventually, 49 whites and 48 blacks (mostly foreign students from the Caribbean) would be arrested.
- The Glen Campbell Goodtime Hour premiered on the CBS television network, to mixed reviews.
- Died: Allen Dulles, 75, U.S. Director of Central Intelligence from 1953 to 1961

== January 30, 1969 (Thursday) ==
- The Beatles gave their last ever public performance in what is now called "the rooftop concert", setting up their instruments on the roof of the London building that served as the corporate headquarters for their recording company, Apple Corps. Lasting for 42 minutes, the impromptu concert atop the five-story building at 3 Savile Row was filmed for their 1970 film Let It Be. The group opened with a few runthroughs of their soon-to-be-released single "Get Back" and its B-side, "Don't Let Me Down". After three more songs (and complaints from people in nearby buildings), London police arrived and allowed John Lennon, Paul McCartney, George Harrison and Ringo Starr to perform one final song. The group closed with the song that opened the concert, their last sung phrase being "Get back to where you once belonged." Their parting words to the assembled crowd were from John Lennon: "I'd like to say thank you on behalf of the group and ourselves. I hope we passed the audition."

== January 31, 1969 (Friday) ==
- The tragedies of 16-year old David Milgaard, wrongfully convicted of a rape and murder, and of the 20-year old victim, Gail Miller, began a couple of hours after Milgaard and two friends arrived in Saskatoon, Saskatchewan to visit one of his friends. Miller's body was found at 8:30. A month later, Milgaard's friend told police that he suspected Milgaard, a high school drop out and hippie, of the crime. For the next 22 years, David Milgaard would be incarcerated in a Saskatchewan prison, given a life sentence in 1970 after his conviction, until his release on April 16, 1992. Five years later, DNA testing would not only exonerate Milgaard, but would identify the person who had committed the crime. Milgaard would receive CDN $10,000,000 (Canadian dollars) in 1999 for the miscarriage of justice.
- Televisión Nacional de Chile was incorporated as the first nationwide network in the South American nation, with the encouragement of President Eduardo Frei Montalva. Test transmissions began the next day on Channel 6 in Punta Arenas. It would begin transmission on September 18, initially reaching 6 of Chile's 25 provinces from stations in the cities of Antofagasta, Arica, Concepción, Punta Arenas, Santiago, and Talca.
- Died: Meher Baba, 74, Indian Gubdy spiritual master who claimed to have been an avatar of the deity Vishnu
