= Matilda De Angelis =

Italian actress and singer (born 1995)

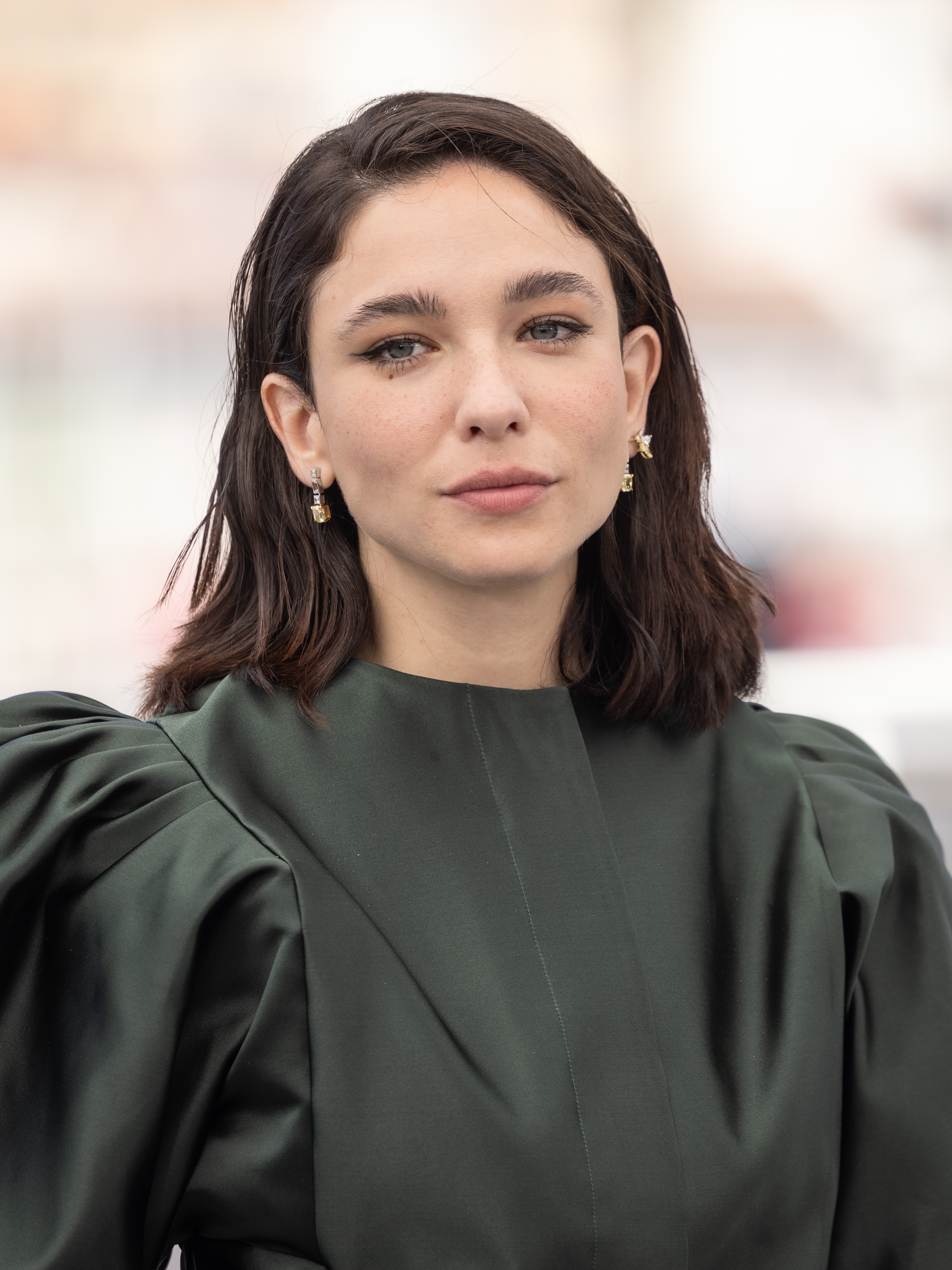
- De Angelis at the 2025 Cannes Film Festival
- Born: 11 September 1995 (age 31); Bologna, Emilia-Romagna, Italy
- Occupations: Actress; singer
- Years active: 2013–present
- Known for: Italian Race; Rose Island; The Law According to Lidia Poët

Matilda De Angelis (Italian pronunciation: [maˈtilda de ˈandʒelis]; born 11 September 1995) is an Italian actress and singer. She made her film debut in Italian Race (2016), which earned her nomination for David di Donatello for Best Actress. She also appeared in The Prize (2017), Youtopia (2018), and Rose Island (2020), for which she won a David di Donatello for Best Supporting Actress and a Nastro d'Argento. In 2025, De Angelis portrayed a vampire in Luc Besson's Dracula.

On television, De Angelis is known for her roles in the Netflix series The Law According to Lidia Poët (2023–2026) and the HBO miniseries The Undoing (2020). She has also sung in soundtracks and recorded solo singles, including the collaboration "Litoranea" with Elisa.

De Angelis is an ambassador for Tiffany & Co.

== Early life ==
De Angelis was born on 11 September 1995 in Bologna, Emilia-Romagna, Italy and grew up in a creative family. Her father worked as a graphic designer and comic book artist, while her younger brother, Tobia De Angelis is also an actor and an assistant director.

De Angelis attended the liceo scientifico "Enrico Fermi" in Bologna, graduating in 2014. From a young age she developed a strong interest in music. At the age of eleven, she began studying guitar and violin, and by thirteen she was writing her own songs. Her early experiences as a musician and performer paved the way for her transition into acting.

== Career ==
In 2011, De Angelis began singing in the band Rumba de Bodas, with which she toured across Europe. They released an album, Karnaval Fou, in 2014.

In 2015, director Matteo Rovere discovered De Angelis via Facebook and cast her as the lead in Italian Race (2016). Rovere specifically sought a non-professional actress capable of speaking the Emilia Romagna dialect. De Angelis secured the role after completing multiple script-based auditions.

For her debut role, De Angelis was nominated for the 2017 David di Donatello film award for Best Actress; she also wrote and sang the film's song "Seventeen", which received a nomination for Best Original Song at the same award ceremony. She was also awarded a Flaiano Prize and a Nastro d'argento for the Best Newcomer.

In 2017, she played the role of Brittia in the ensemble comedy film The Prize by Alessandro Gassmann. In 2018, she starred in the drama film Youtopia, where she played a teenage girl selling her virginity online in order to support her family.

In 2020, she was in the main cast of the HBO television miniseries The Undoing and starred in the Netflix original film Rose Island, directed by Sydney Sibilia. For her role in Rose Island she was awarded the David di Donatello for Best Supporting Actress.

De Angelis co-hosted the first date of the Sanremo Music Festival 2021 alongside Amadeus. The same year she acted in Italian films A Bookshop in Paris and Atlas, the latter for which she was awarded Best Actress at the Taormina Film Fest. In 2022 she acted in Robbing Mussolini and starred alongside Liev Schreiber in the film adaptation of Ernest Hemingway's novel with the same name Across the River and into the Trees. The same year she collaborated on the third single "Litoranea" from Elisa's studio album Ritorno al futuro/Back to the Future, being De Angelis first certified song by FIMI.

In 2023 she played the lead role in the Italian miniseries The Law According to Lidia Poët, for which she received a Nastro d'argento award nomination for best actress, and which won the award for Best Crime Series. Between 2023 and 2024, she acted in the lead role of Amazon Prime Video television series Citadel: Diana.

In 2025, she played a vampire in Luc Besson's Dracula and played the leading role in Siblings (La vita da grandi), directed by Greta Scarano, and in Mario Martone's Fuori, which premiered at the 78th Cannes Film Festival. She participated in the 2026 Winter Olympics opening ceremony, held in Milan's San Siro stadium. In May 2026, she won her second David di Donatello for Best Supporting Actress, for Fuori.

== Personal life ==
De Angelis was named after Natalie Portman’s character in Léon: The Professional.

Since 2022, De Angelis has been in a relationship with Alessandro De Santis, singer and frontman of musical duo Santi Francesi. They became engaged in 2024. She moved to Rome in 2024 and eventually to Milan to be with her partner.

== Filmography ==
=== Film ===
Year	Title	Role	Notes
2016	Italian Race	Giulia De Martino	
2017	A Family	Stella	
2017	Coco	Tía Victoria (voice)	Italian dub; voice role
2017	The Prize	Britta	
2018	Youtopia	Matilde	
2018	Reckless	Soledad Agramante	
2020	Divine	Maria	
2020	Rose Island	Gabriella	
2021	Atlas	Allegra	
2021	A Bookshop in Paris	Albertine	
2022	Across the River and into the Trees	Renata Contarini	
2022	Robbing Mussolini	Yvonne	
2025	Siblings	Irene Nanni	
2025	Fuori	Roberta	
2025	Dracula	Maria	
2026	The Lesson	Elisabetta Sferzi	

=== Television ===
Year	Title	Role	Notes
2015–2018	Tutto può succedere	Ambra Scalvino	Main role; 42 episodes
2019	I ragazzi dello Zecchino d'Oro	Mariele Ventre	Television movie
2020	The Undoing	Elena Alves	Main role; 6 episodes
2021	Leonardo	Caterina da Cremona	Main role; 8 episodes
2023	Call My Agent - Italia	Herself	Season 1, episode 4
2023–2026	The Law According to Lidia Poët	Lidia Poët	Lead role; 18 episodes
2024	Citadel: Diana	Diana Cavalieri	Lead role; 6 episodes

=== Music videos ===
Year	Title	Artist(s)
2016	"Tutto qui accade"	Negramaro
2018	"Felicità puttana"	Thegiornalisti
2022	"Litoranea"	Elisa featuring Matilda De Angelis
2024	"Gatti"	Santi Francesi

== Discography ==
=== Singles ===
List of singles, with chart positions, album name and certifications
Single	Year	Peak chart positions	Certifications	Album
Single	Year	ITA	Certifications	Album
"Domani"	2016	—		Non-album singles
Mai dire"	2016	—		Non-album singles
"Seventeen"	2016	—		Non-album singles
"Shut Up" (featuring Empatee du Weiss)	2016	—		Non-album singles
"Litoranea" (Elisa featuring Matilda De Angelis)	2022	—	ITA: Gold	Ritorno al futuro/Back to the Future

=== Soundtrack appearances ===
Track(s)	Year	Credit	Soundtrack album
"Seventeen"	2016	Voice	Veloce come il vento (Original Motion Picture Soundtrack)
"Wings "	2017	Voice	Il premio (Original Movie Soundtrack)
"Proof"	2017	Voice	Il premio (Original Movie Soundtrack)
"Ribellati e va! (Rage)"	2024	Voice	A Greyhound of a Girl (Original Movie Soundtrack)
"More Emer (Addio Emer)"	2024	Voice	A Greyhound of a Girl (Original Movie Soundtrack)
"Sei tutta intorno a me (Forever in our Hearts)"	2024	Voice	A Greyhound of a Girl (Original Movie Soundtrack)

== Awards and nominations ==
Award	Year	Category	Work	Result	Ref.
Berlin International Film Festival	2018	Shooting Stars Award	Herself	Won	
Berlin International Film Festival	2018	Bacco Award	Herself	Won	
David di Donatello	2017	Best Actress	Italian Race	Nominated	
David di Donatello	2017	Best Original Song	"Seventeen" (from Italian Race)	Nominated	
David di Donatello	2021	Best Supporting Actress	Rose Island	Won	
David di Donatello	2026	Best Supporting Actress	Fuori	Won	
Nastri d'Argento	2016	Best Breakthrough Act	Italian Race	Won	
Nastri d'Argento	2018	Best Original Song	"Proof" (from The Prize)	Nominated	
Nastri d'Argento	2025	Best Supporting Actress	Fuori	Won	
Premi Flaiano	2016	Best Debut Actress	Italian Race	Won	
Taormina Film Fest	2016	Revelation actress of the year	Italian Race	Won	
Taormina Film Fest	2021	Best Actress	Atlas	Won	
Nastri d'Argento Grandi Serie	2022	Best Actress - International Performance	The Undoing	Won	
Nastri d'Argento Grandi Serie	2023	Best Actress	The Law According to Lidia Poët	Nominated	
