= Republic of Rose Island =

1968 micronation in the Adriatic Sea

Republic of Rose Island Respubliko de la Insulo de la Rozoj (Esperanto) Repubblica dell'Isola delle Rose (Italian)
- Micronation (unrecognized entity)
- Flag

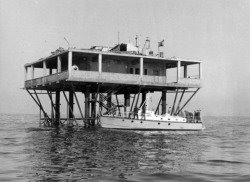

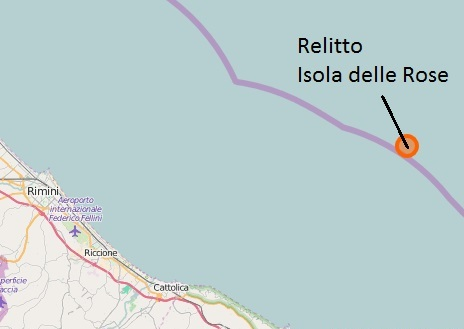
- Location: Adriatic Sea, near Emilia-Romagna, Italy
- Area claimed: 0.0004 km^{2} (0.00015 sq mi)
- Official language: Esperanto
- Type: Offshore platform (seastead)
- Claimed by: Giorgio Rosa
- Dates claimed: 1 May 1968–26 June 1968 (Italian Navy assumed control) or 26 February 1969 (disestablished)

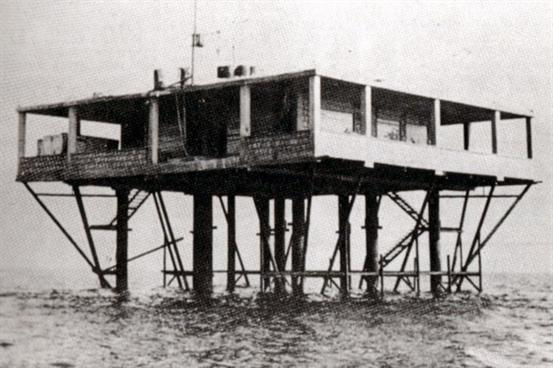
Island under construction

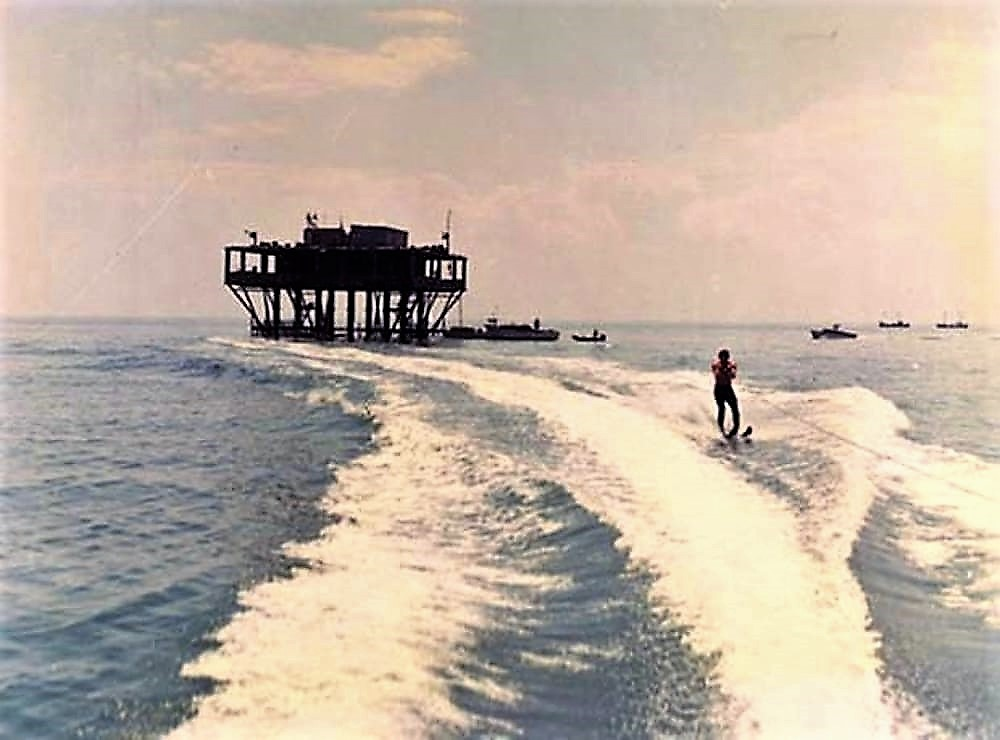
Republic of Rose Island

The Republic of Rose Island (Esperanto: Respubliko de la Insulo de la Rozoj; Italian: Repubblica dell'Isola delle Rose, lit. 'Republic of the Island of the Roses') was a short-lived micronation on a man-made platform in the Adriatic Sea, 11 kilometres (6.8 mi) off the coast of the region of Emilia-Romagna, Italy, built by Italian engineer Giorgio Rosa, who made himself its president and declared it an independent state on 1 May 1968.

Although Rose Island had its own government, currency, post office, and commercial establishments, and the official language was Esperanto, it was never formally recognized as a sovereign state by any country of the world. The Italian government viewed it as a ploy by Rosa to raise money from tourists while avoiding national taxation. Rose Island was occupied by Italian police forces on 26 June 1968, subjected to a naval blockade, and eventually demolished in February 1969.

== Etymology ==
It is believed that the Esperanto term Rozoj (in Italian: rose) was borrowed from the surname of Giorgio Rosa, the designer and builder of the artificial platform, as well as the creator and inspirer of the state entity, as well as from his desire to "see roses bloom on the sea".

== History ==
In 1958, Italian engineer Giorgio Rosa funded the construction of a 400-square-metre (4,300 sq ft) platform supported by nine pylons and furnished it with a number of commercial establishments, including a restaurant, bar, nightclub, souvenir shop, and post office, with construction being completed in 1967.

The platform declared independence on 1 May 1968, under the Esperanto name Insulo de la Rozoj, with Rosa as self-declared president. Rose Island issued a number of stamps, including one showing its approximate location in the Adriatic Sea. The purported currency of the republic was the mill, and this appeared on early stamp issues, although no coins or banknotes are known to have been produced.

Rosa's actions were viewed by the Italian government as a ploy to raise money from tourists while avoiding national taxation. Whether or not this was the real reason behind Rosa's micronation, the Italian government's response was swift: On 26 June 1968, 55 days after the island declared independence, the Italian navy sent a group of four carabinieri and Guardia di Finanza officers, who assumed control, cleared the island, and set up a blockade so no one could re-enter.

At first, the Italian government tried to dismantle the island, but they found it impossible, so they decided to blow it up instead. The Italian Navy bombed the island twice, with the first time failing, and the second bombing taking place on 13 February 1969, but the island still stood. Afterward, Rosa's self-declared government in exile created stamps depicting the events. Rosa was billed by the Italian government for war costs. Finally, on 26 February 1969, the island was toppled by a storm. Only one death was counted but never confirmed: apparently, Rosa's dog was on the platform during the facility's detonation.

Rosa died in 2017, having given his blessing for a film to be made about Rose Island. This was released in 2020.

Since the first decade of the 2000s, Rose Island's history has been the subject of documentary research and rediscoveries, based on the utopian aspect of its genesis.

== In popular culture ==
- Rose Island is featured in the Italian comic book Martin Mystère, n. 193.
- Rose Island, a 2020 film based on the story of the micronation, directed by Sydney Sibilia, was released on Netflix on 8 December 2020.

== See also ==
- REM Island, a platform towed into international waters for the purposes of offshore radio broadcasting.
- Republic of Minerva, a short-lived artificial island micronation in the Pacific Ocean.
- Sealand, a declared principality near the United Kingdom, built on a World War II sea fort.
