= 61st David di Donatello =

2016 Italian film awards

- Date: 18 April 2016
- Site: De Paolis Studios, Rome, Italy
- Hosted by: Alessandro Cattelan

Highlights
- Best Picture: Perfect Strangers
- Most awards: They Call Me Jeeg (8)
- Most nominations: They Call Me Jeeg (17)

Television coverage
- Network: Sky Cinema

The 61st David di Donatello ceremony, presented by the Accademia del Cinema Italiano, was held on 18 April 2016 to honor the best in Italian cinema in 2015.

== Winners and nominees ==
Best Film: Perfect Strangers – directed by Paolo Genovese‡.; Don't Be Bad – directed by Claudio Caligari; Fire at Sea – directed by Gianfranco Rosi; Tale of Tales – directed by Matteo Garrone; Youth – directed by Paolo Sorrentino	Best Producer: They Call Me Jeeg – Gabriele Mainetti for Goon Films with Rai Cinema‡; Don't Be Bad – Paolo Bogna, Simone Isola and Valerio Mastandrea for Kimerafilm, Rai Cinema and Taodue Film, associate producer Pietro Valsecchi, in collaboration with Leone Film Group; Fire at Sea – 21uno Film, Stemal Entertainment, Istituto Luce Cinecittà, Rai Cinema, and Les Films d'Ici with Arte France Cinéma; Tale of Tales – Archimede and Rai Cinema; Youth – Nicola Giuliano, Francesca Cima and Carlotta Calori for Indigo Film
Best Director: Matteo Garrone – Tale of Tales‡; Claudio Caligari – Don't Be Bad; Paolo Genovese – Perfect Strangers; Gianfranco Rosi – Fire at Sea; Paolo Sorrentino – Youth	Best New Director: Gabriele Mainetti – They Call Me Jeeg‡; Alberto Caviglia – Burning Love; Carlo Lavagna – Arianna; Piero Messina – The Wait; Francesco Miccichè and Fabio Bonifacci – Them Who?; Adriano Valerio – Banat
Best Actor: Claudio Santamaria – They Call Me Jeeg as Enzo Ceccotti‡; Alessandro Borghi – Don't Be Bad as Vittorio; Marco Giallini – Perfect Strangers as Rocco; Luca Marinelli – Don't Be Bad as Cesare; Valerio Mastandrea – Perfect Strangers as Lele	Best Actress: Ilenia Pastorelli – They Call Me Jeeg as Alessia‡; Àstrid Bergès-Frisbey – Alaska as Nadine; Juliette Binoche – The Wait as Anna; Paola Cortellesi – The Last Will Be the Last as Luciana Colacci; Sabrina Ferilli – Me, Myself and Her as Marina Baldi; Anna Foglietta – Perfect Strangers as Carlotta; Valeria Golino – Per amor vostro as Anna Ruotolo
Best Supporting Actor: Luca Marinelli – They Call Me Jeeg as Fabio Cannizzaro / Zingaro‡; Giuseppe Battiston – The Complexity of Happiness as Carlo Bernini; Fabrizio Bentivoglio – The Last Will Be the Last as Antonio Zanzotto; Valerio Binasco – Alaska as Sandro; Alessandro Borghi – Suburra as Aureliano Adami / Number 8	Best Supporting Actress: Antonia Truppo – They Call Me Jeeg as Nuniza‡; Sonia Bergamasco – Quo vado? as Dr. Sironi; Claudia Cardinale – Ultima fermata as Rosa; Piera Degli Esposti – Solo as Dr. Grunewald; Elisabetta De Vito – Don't Be Bad as Madre di Cesare
David di Donatello for Best Screenplay: Perfect Strangers – Filippo Bologna, Paolo Costella, Paolo Genovese, Paola Mammini and Rolando Ravello‡; Don't Be Bad – Claudio Caligari, Giordano Meacci and Francesca Serafini; Tale of Tales – Edoardo Albinati, Ugo Chiti, Matteo Garrone and Massimo Gaudioso; They Call Me Jeeg – Nicola Guaglianone and Menotti; Youth – Paolo Sorrentino	Best Cinematography: Tale of Tales – Peter Suschitzky‡; Don't Be Bad – Maurizio Calvesi; Suburra – Paolo Carnera; They Call Me Jeeg – Michele D'Attanasio; Youth – Luca Bigazzi
Best Production Design: Tale of Tales – Dimitri Capuani and Alessia Anfuso‡; The Correspondence – Maurizio Sabatini; Don't Be Bad – Giada Calabria; Suburra – Paki Meduri; They Call Me Jeeg – Massimiliano Sturiale; Youth – Ludovica Ferrario	Best Score: Youth – David Lang‡; The Correspondence – Ennio Morricone; Don't Be Bad – Paolo Vivaldi and Alessandro Sartini; Tale of Tales – Alexandre Desplat; They Call Me Jeeg – Michele Braga and Gabriele Mainetti
Best Original Song: "Simple Song #3" from Youth – Music and lyrics by David Lang; performed by Sumi Jo ‡; "A cuor leggero" from Don't Be Bad – Music, lyrics and performed by Riccardo Sinigallia; "Perfetti sconosciuti" from Perfect Strangers – Music by Bungaro and Cesare Chiodo; lyrics and performed by Fiorella Mannoia; "La prima Repubblica" from Quo Vado? – Music, lyrics and performed by Checco Zalone; "Torta di noi" from The Complexity of Happiness – Music, lyrics and performed by Niccolò Contessa	Best Editing: They Call Me Jeeg – Andrea Maguolo and Federico Conforti‡; Fire at Sea – Jacopo Quadri; Perfect Strangers – Consuelo Catucci; Suburra – Patrizio Marone; Youth – Cristiano Travaglioli
Best Sound: Don't Be Bad – Angelo Bonanni‡; Perfect Strangers – Umberto Montesanti; Tale of Tales – Maricetta Lombardo; They Call Me Jeeg – Valentino Giannì; Youth – Emanuele Cecere	Best Costumes: Tale of Tales – Massimo Cantini Parrini‡; The Correspondence – Gemma Mascagni; Don't Be Bad – Chiara Ferrantini; They Call Me Jeeg – Mary Montalto; Youth – Carlo Poggioli
Best Digital Effects: Tale of Tales – Makinarium‡; Game Therapy – EDI Italian Digital Effects; Suburra – Visualogie; They Call Me Jeeg – Chromatica; Youth – Peerless	Best Make-up Artist: Tale of Tales – Gino Tamagnini, Valter Casotto and Luigi D'Andrea‡; The Correspondence – Enrico Iacoponi; Don't Be Bad – Lidia Minì; They Call Me Jeeg – Giulio Pezza; Youth – Maurizio Silvi
Best Hairstylist: Tale of Tales – Francesco Pegoretti‡; The Correspondence – Elena Gregorini; Don't Be Bad – Sharim Sabatini; They Call Me Jeeg – Angelo Vannella; Youth – Aldo Signoretti	Best Documentary: S Is for Stanley – directed by Alex Infascelli‡; I bambini sanno – directed by Walter Veltroni; Harry's Bar – directed by Carlotta Cerquetti; The Other Side – directed by Roberto Minervini; Revelstoke: A Kiss in the Wind – directed by Nicola Moruzzi
Best Short Film: Bellissima – directed by Alessandro Capitani‡; A metà luce – directed by Laura Gigante; Per Anna – directed by Andrea Zuliani; La ballata dei senzatetto – directed by Monica Manganelli; Where Water Comes Together with Other Water – directed by Gianluca Mangiasciutti and Massimo Loi	Best European Film: Son of Saul (Hungary) – directed by László Nemes‡; 45 Years (United Kingdom) – directed by Andrew Haigh; The Brand New Testament (Belgium/France/Luxembourg) – directed by Jaco Van Dormael; The Danish Girl (United Kingdom / United States) – directed by Tom Hooper; A Perfect Day (Spain) – directed by Fernando León de Aranoa
Best Foreign Film: Bridges of Spies (United States/Germany/UK) – directed by Steven Spielberg‡; Carol (United States/UK) – directed by Todd Haynes; Inside Out (United States) – directed by Pete Docter; Remember (Canada/Germany) – directed by Atom Egoyan; Spotlight (United States) – directed by Todd Haynes	David Youth Award: The Correspondence – directed by Giuseppe Tornatore‡; Alaska – directed by Claudio Cupellini; Don't Be Bad – directed by Claudio Caligari; The Last Will Be the Last – directed by Massimiliano Bruno; Quo Vado? – directed by Gennaro Nunziante
Special David Awards: Gina Lollobrigida; Taviani Brothers
