= Emanuela Fanelli =

Italian actress (born 1986)

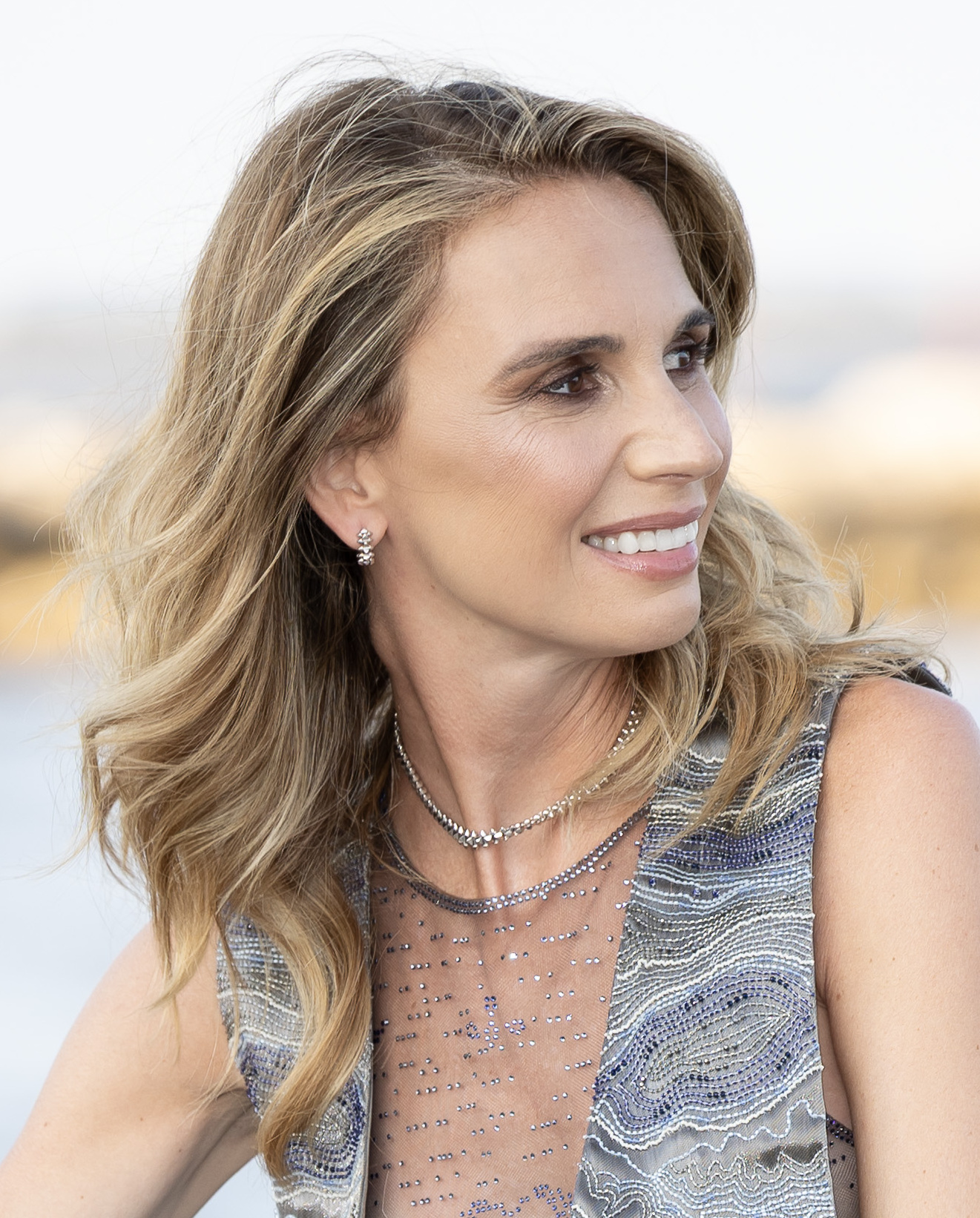
- Fanelli in Venice 2025
- Born: 6 July 1986 (age 40); Rome, Italy
- Occupations: Actress; comedian
- Years active: 2003–present

Emanuela Fanelli (born 6 July 1986) is an Italian actress and comedian. Known for her work on sketch comedy television for over ten years, she reached worldwide acting recognition after starring in the critically acclaimed films Dry (2022) and There's Still Tomorrow (2023), receiving two consecutive David di Donatello awards for Best Supporting Actress.

== Life and career ==
Fanelli began her acting career on stage when she was a teenager. She worked in theatre for many years studying under Luigi Onorato, Giorgio Amato, and David Fiandanese. She made her cinema debut in 2015 with Don't Be Bad by Claudio Caligari, which was followed by other films: The Last Will Be the Last and Ignorance Is Bliss by Massimiliano Bruno, Solo by Laura Morante, La casa di famiglia by Augusto Fornari and A mano disarmata by Claudio Bonivento. In 2016 she starred in the role of Cinzia, the female protagonist of the TV series Dov'è Mario?, produced by Wildside for Sky Uno, alongside Corrado Guzzanti. She won a series of awards, including the special mention for best actress and best monologue at the "Ciak, si Roma!" event of the Rome International Film Festival, from a jury including Carlo Verdone, Daniele Luchetti and Lina Wertmüller.

In 2014, Fanelli won the award for Best Actress at the 48 Hour Film Project for her role in the short film Un film d'amore. Since 2016, she has appeared on radio alongside Lillo & Greg on the programme 610 on Rai Radio 2 in which she plays various characters. In 2019 she was one of the protagonists of the TV programme Battute? on Rai 2 and she featured in the music video for "Immigrato", a song by Checco Zalone published to promote the release of his film Tolo Tolo in cinemas.

Since 2020, Fanelli has taken part in the programme Una pezza di Lundini, with Valerio Lundini, broadcast from 7 September 2020 on Rai 2. In 2021, she participated in the Sanremo Music Festival and joined Lo Stato Sociale and Francesco Pannofino in a cover of "Non è per sempre" by Afterhours. She also served as patroness of the awards ceremony at the 2021 Torino Film Festival. She was later chosen as host for 60 sul 2, a programme celebrating the sixtieth anniversary of Rai 2.

In 2022, Fanelli starred in Paolo Virzì's Dry, which earned her the David di Donatello for Best Supporting Actress. In 2023, she portrayed Marisa in Paola Cortellesi's directorial debut There's Still Tomorrow, which became one of the highest-grossing films of all time in Italy. In 2024, she was again directed by Virzì in the film Another Summer Holiday. That same year, she again won Best Supporting Actress at the 69th David di Donatello for her performance in There's Still Tomorrow.

== Filmography ==
Film
Year	Title	Role(s)	Notes
2014	Un film d'amore	Cicova	Short film
2015	Don't Be Bad	Sloppy Girl #1	Cameo appearance
2015	The Last Will Be the Last	Nadia	
2017	Ignorance Is Bliss	Iris	
2017	Cose dell'altro mondo	Mother	Short film
2017	The Family House	Ornella	
2019	A mano disarmata	Chiara Colombo	
2022	Dry	Raffaella Zarate	
2023	There's Still Tomorrow	Marisa	
2024	Another Summer Holiday	Daniela	
2025	Madly	Trilli	
2026	The Noise of New Things		

Television
Year	Title	Role(s)	Notes
2016	Dov'è Mario?	Cinzia	3 episodes
2023	Sono Lillo	Herself	Season 1, episode 3
2023–present	Call My Agent - Italia	Luana Pericoli	Recurring role; 10 episodes
2024	No Activity: Italy	Palmira Piccoli	Main role
2026	My 2 Cents	Smeralda (voice)	Episode: "Come comete"
2026	Peccato	Herself (fictional version)	Lead role; also creator and writer

=== Music videos ===
Year	Title	Artist(s)	Notes
2019	"Immigrato"	Checco Zalone	
2023	"Tutta"	Daniele Silvestri	

== Television programs ==
Year	Title	Role(s)	Notes
2018	La TV delle ragazze – Gli Stati Generali 1988-2018	Herself / Various	Cast member
2019	Battute?	Herself / Various	Comedy show
2020–2022	Una pezza di Lundini	Herself / Co-host / Various	Comedy talk show

== Accolades ==
Year	Award	Category	Nominated work	Result
2014	48 Hour Film Project	Best Actress	Un film d'amore	Won
2021	Satira Award	TV Character of the Year	Una pezza di Lundini	Won
2023	David di Donatello	Best Supporting Actress	Dry	Won
2023	Nastro d'Argento	Best Actress in a TV Series or Miniseries	Call My Agent - Italia	Nominated
2024	David di Donatello	Best Supporting Actress	There's Still Tomorrow	Won
