= Edoardo Leo =

Italian actor, director and screenwriter (born 1972)

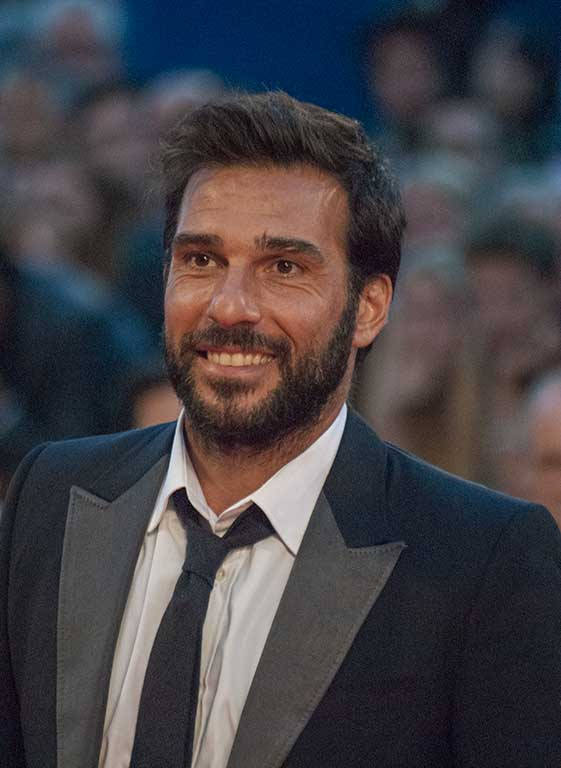
- Born: 21 April 1972 (age 54); Rome, Italy
- Occupations: Actor, director
- Years active: 1995-present
- Height: 1.80 m (5 ft 11 in)

Edoardo Leo (born 21 April 1972) is an Italian actor, director and screenwriter.

== Life and career ==
Born in Rome, Leo, a graduate in Literature and Philosophy from the Sapienza University of Rome, started attending acting courses at young age and made his professional debut in 1995, in the TV-movie La luna rubata. He had his breakout in 2003, with the role of Marcello in the TV-series Un medico in famiglia.

In 2009, Leo debuted as screenwriter and director with the road movie 18 Years Later, which got him some awards at several international film festivals, a nomination at David di Donatello for Best New Director and a nomination for a Nastro d'Argento in the same category. In 2014 he received the Nino Manfredi Prize at the Silver Ribbon Awards. His 2015 film The Legendary Giulia and Other Miracles won the David di Donatello of the Youth and the Nastro d'Argento for best comedy film.

In 2023, he started working on his directorial feature debut, Non sono quello che sono, based on The Tragedy of Othello.

== Filmography ==
=== Film ===
Key
†	Denotes films that have not yet been released

Year	Title	Role(s)	Notes
1997	La classe non è acqua	Marco Talenti	Feature film debut
1998	Grazie di tutto	Marzio	
2002	La collezione invisibile	Mario	
2003	People of Rome	Himself	Documentary film
2004	Tutto in quella notte	Davide	
2004	City Limits	Lorenzo Corsi	
2005	Taxi Lovers	Massimo	
2007	Scrivilo sui muri	Lover	Cameo appearance
2008	L'anno mille	Commandante	
2008	Billo - Il grand Dakhaar	Inmate	Cameo appearance
2010	18 Years Later	Mirko	Debut as a director and screenwriter
2011	Escort in Love	Barman	Cameo appearance
2012	Ci vediamo a casa	Franco	
2012	Viva l'Italia	Marco	
2012	To Rome with Love	Journalist	Cameo appearance
2013	Out of the Blue	Paolo	Also director
2013	The Move of The Penguin	Bruno	Also writer
2014	Blame Freud	Roberto	
2014	Do You Remember Me?	Roberto Marino	Also writer
2014	Pane e Burlesque	Vincenzo	
2014	I Can Quit Whenever I Want	Pietro Zinni	
2015	The Legendary Giulia and Other Miracles	Fausto	Also director
2015	Them Who?	David	
2016	Perfect Strangers	Cosimo	
2016	What's the Big Deal	Claudio	Also director and writer
2017	I Can Quit Whenever I Want: Masterclass	Pietro Zinni	
2017	I Can Quit Whenever I Want: Ad Honorem	Pietro Zinni	
2018	Just Believe	Massimo Alberti	Also writer
2019	All You Need Is Crime	Renatino	
2019	Gli uomini d'oro	Il Lupo	
2019	The Lion King	Timon (voice)	Italian dub
2019	The Goddess of Fortune	Alessandro Marchetti	
2020	18 Presents	Alessio	
2020	Ritorno al crimine	Renatino	
2021	Breaking Up in Rome	Tommaso	Also director and writer
2022	Still Time	Dante	
2022	C'era una volta il crimine	Renatino	
2022	I cassamortari	Giuseppe Pasti	
2022	The Desired War	Tom	
2023	The Best Days	Alessandro Felici	Also director and writer
2023	Mia	Sergio	
2023	The Worst Days	Alessandro Felici	Also director and writer
2023	Leo	Leo (voice)	Italian dub
2023	The Order of Time	Enrico	
2024	Non sono quello che sono	Iago	Also director and writer
2024	Mufasa: The Lion King	Timon (voice)	Italian dub
2025	Madly	Piero	
2025	30 notti con il mio ex	Bruno	
2025	Love in Separate Beds	Valerio	

=== Television ===
Year	Title	Role(s)	Notes
1996	I ragazzi del muretto	Angelo	Episode: "Vincere"
1997	L'avvocato Porta	Vincenzo	4 episodes
1998	Il maresciallo Rocca	Piero Cambi	Episode: "Enigma finale"
1999	Operazione Odissea	Vincenzo "Achille" Marano	Two-parts television film
2001–2004	Un medico in famiglia	Marcello	11 episodes
2002	Don Matteo	Franco Lodati	Episode: "Scandalo in città"
2002	Il bello delle donne	Ivan	Episode: "Agosto"
2002	Ma il portiere non c'è mai?	Otello	Main role
2003	Blindati	Lidiano Cruciani	Two-parts television film
2005	Ho sposato un calciatore	Vito Palma	Main role
2006	Lo zio d'America	Fabio	3 episodes
2007	Caterina e le sue figlie	Roby	6 episodes
2007	Liberi di giocare	Carlo Mariani	Two-parts television film
2008–2010	Romanzo criminale - La serie	Nembo Kid	Main role
2009	Crimini	Luca	Episode: "Mork & Mindy"
2009	I Cesaroni	Stefano	2 episodes
2011	Dov'è mia figlia?	Marco Valle	Television film
2011	Baciati dall'amore	Stefano Malvolti	Main role
2012	Titanic: Blood and Steel	Andrea	Main role
2018	Dopo Festival	Himself / Host	Sanremo Music Festival afertshow
2019	Ognuno è perfetto	Ivan De Simone	Main role
2024	Il clandestino	Luca Travaglia	Lead role
