= Alessandro Gassmann =

Italian actor (born 1965)

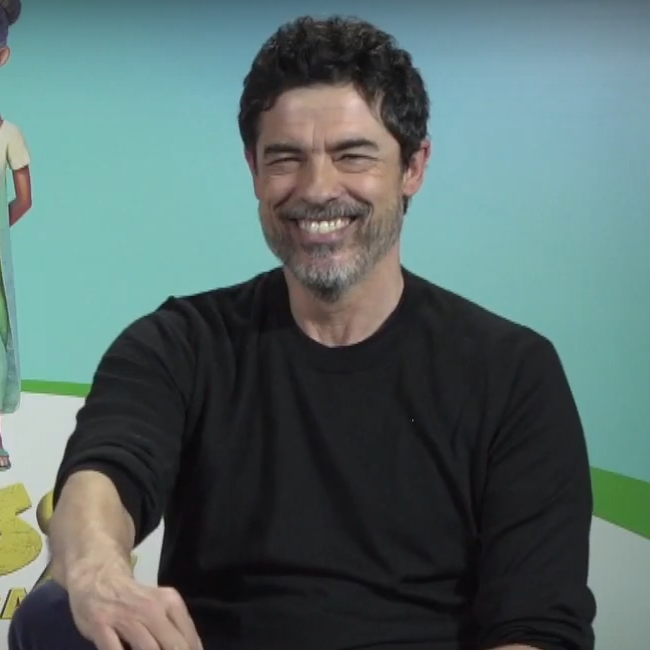
- Gassmann in 2021
- Born: Alessandro Gassman; 24 February 1965 (age 61); Rome, Italy
- Occupations: Actor; film director
- Years active: 1982–present
- Spouse: Sabrina Knaflitz (m. 1998)
- Children: Leo Gassmann
- Parent(s): Vittorio Gassman; Juliette Mayniel

Alessandro Gassmann (né Gassman; born 24 February 1965) is an Italian actor and film director.

== Early life ==
Born in Rome, he is the son of Italian actor Vittorio Gassman and French actress Juliette Mayniel. He is of Italian, German, Jewish and French descent.

== Career ==
He debuted at age 17 in the autobiographical film Di padre in figlio, written and directed with his father, under whose tutoring he later studied in the Theatre Workshop of Florence. Among his theatrical activities, he was noted for his playing in Pier Paolo Pasolini's Affabulazione (1984).

In 1996, he began an artistic partnership with his friend Gianmarco Tognazzi with whom he co-acted in popular movies like Uomini senza donne, Facciamo festa, Teste di cocco, Lovest, I miei più cari amici and Natale a Beverly Hills, in the theatrical version of Some Like It Hot and as dubbers of the Disney cartoon The Road to El Dorado. In 1997, he won international acclaim with Ferzan Özpetek's Hamam.

He was subsequently chosen by Yves Saint Laurent as a testimonial for his perfume Opium, and posed in a nude calendar for the Italian magazine Max. He also became a testimonial for Lancia of Musa, as well as appearing in an ad for the Glen Grant liquor. As an actor, he worked for several TV miniseries and, in France, in the action movie Transporter 2 (opposite Jason Statham), produced by Luc Besson. In 2006, Gassmann appeared in the comedy Non prendere impegni stasera.

He then took part in TV dramas such as Piccolo mondo antico, Le stagioni del cuore, La guerra è finita and La Sacra Famiglia; he also acted in the US action film Transporter 2 and in Italy in the comedy Non prendere impegni stasera.

In 2008, he acted in the film Caos calmo as the brother of the main lead, interpreted by Nanni Moretti. For this role, he was honoured by many awards: the David di Donatello award for a supporting actor, the Ciak d'oro, the Nastro d'Argento and the Globo d'oro of the foreign press. In the same year, he adapted for the stage the teleplay 12 Angry Men, written by Reginald Rose in 1954 that was made into a film by Sidney Lumet in 1957: the performance was taken up again in 2009, year in which he also appeared as leading actor in 4 padri single by Paolo Monico, Ex by Fausto Brizzi and Il compleanno by Marco Filiberti as well in the TV miniseries Pinocchio directed by Alberto Sironi.

He is an acting Tutor in Cinecittà at Act Multimedia.

== Personal life ==
Since 1998, Gassmann has been married to actress Sabrina Knaflitz. They have a son, Leo.

== Filmography ==
=== Film ===
Title	Year	Role(s)	Director	Notes
Di padre in figlio	1982	Himself	Vittorio Gassman	Biographical film
Devils of Monza	1987	Osio	Luciano Odorisio	
Big Deal After 20 Years	1987	Waiter	Amanzio Todini	Cameo appearance
When We Were Repressed	1992	Federico	Pino Quartullo	
Ostinato destino	1992	Marcello Rambaldi	Gianfranco Albano	
Golden Balls	1993	Miguel	Bigas Luna	
A Month by the Lake	1995	Vittorio Balsari	John Irvin	
Uomini senza donne	1996	Alex	Angelo Longoni	
Stella's Favor	1996	Rodolfo	Giancarlo Scarchilli	
Facciamo fiesta	1997	Sandro	Angelo Longoni	
Lovest	1997	Johnny	Giulio Base	
Hamam	1997	Francesco	Ferzan Özpetek	
My Dearest Friends	1998	Rossano	Alessandro Benvenuti	
Toni	1999	Toni	Philomène Esposito	
La bomba	1999	Nino	Giulio Base	
The Road to El Dorado	2000	Miguel (voice)	Bibo Bergeron, Don Paul	Italian dub
Teste di cocco	2000	Pietro Tiraboschi	Ugo Giordani	
The Bankers of God: The Calvi Affair	2002	Francesco Pazienza	Giuseppe Ferrara	
Guardians of the Clouds	2004	Batino	Luciano Odorisio	
La separazione	2005	Antonio	Mariano Provenzano	Short film
Transporter 2	2005	Gianni Chellini	Louis Leterrier	
Don't Make Any Plans for Tonight	2006	Giorgio	Gianluca Maria Tavarelli	
Monday	2006	Alex	Simone Catania	Short film
Quiet Chaos	2008	Carlo Paladini	Antonello Grimaldi	
The Seed of Discord	2008	Mario	Pappi Corsicato	
Carnera: The Walking Mountain	2008	None	Renzo Martinelli	Co-writer
Many Kisses Later	2009	Davide	Fausto Brizzi	
David's Birthday	2009	Diego	Marco Filiberti	
Natale a Beverly Hills	2009	Marcello	Neri Parenti	
Basilicata Coast to Coast	2010	Rocco Santamaria	Rocco Papaleo	
The Father and the Foreigner	2010	Diego	Ricky Tognazzi	
The Woman of My Dreams	2010	Giorgio	Luca Lucini	
Baciato dalla fortuna	2011	Silvano	Paolo Costella	
Ex 2: Still Friends?	2011	Massimo Marangoni	Carlo Vanzina	
Viva l'Italia	2012	Valerio Spagnolo	Massimiliano Bruno	
The Mongrel	2013	Roman	Alessandro Gassman	Also director
Blame Freud	2014	Alessandro	Paolo Genovese	
The Dinner	2014	Massimo	Ivano De Matteo	
An Italian Name	2015	Paolo Pontecorvo	Francesca Archibugi	
God Willing	2015	Father Pietro	Edoardo Falcone	
The Little Prince	2015	Snake (voice)	Mark Osborne	Italian dub
The Last Will Be the Last	2015	Stefano Colacci	Massimiliano Bruno	
Torn	2015	Himself	Alessandro Gassman	Documentary; also writer and director
Onda su onda	2016	Ruggero	Rocco Papaleo	
Non c'è più religione	2016	Marietto / Bilal	Luca Miniero	
Ignorance Is Bliss	2017	Filippo	Massimiliano Bruno	
Cinderella the Cat	2017	Primo Gemito (voice)	Alessandro Rak, Marino Guarnieri	Italian dub
The Prize	2017	Oreste Passamonte	Alessandro Gassman	Also writer and director
The Stolen Caravaggio	2018	Alessandro Pes	Roberto Andò	
The Grinch	2018	Grinch (voice)	Scott Mosier, Yarrow Cheney	Italian dub
All You Need Is Crime	2019	Sebastiano	Massimiliano Bruno	
An Almost Ordinary Summer	2019	Carlo	Simone Godano	
My Brother Chases Dinosaurs	2019	Davide Mazzariol	Stefano Cipani	
The Croods: A New Age	2020	Phil Betterman (voice)	Joel Crawford	Italian dub
Thou Shalt Not Hate	2020	Simone Segre	Mauro Mancini	
Ritorno al crimine	2021	Sebastiano	Massimiliano Bruno	Direct-to-video
Il silenzio grande	2021	Gianluca Fideschi	Alessandro Gassman	Cameo; also writer and director
Il pataffio	2022	Frate Cappuccio	Francesco Lagi	
My Name Is Vendetta	2022	Santo Romeo	Cosimo Gomez	
The Order of Time	2023	Pietro Balestrieri	Liliana Cavani	
Bare Hands	2024	Minuto	Mauro Mancini	

=== Television ===
Title	Year	Role(s)	Network	Notes
Un bambino di nome Gesù	1987	Adult Jesus	Canale 5	Television film
A Season of Giants	1990	Francesco Granacci	Rai 1	Television film
Il commissario Corso	1991	Giulio	Rai 2	Episode: "La confessione"
Sněhurka a sedm trpasliku	1992	Prince Andreas	ZDF	Television film
La famiglia Ricordi	1995	Gaetano Donizetti	Rai 1	Main role
Samson and Delilah	1996	Amrok	Rai 1	Television film
Nessuno escluso	1997	Nicola Fiorillo	Rai 2	Television film
Lourdes	2000	Henri / Bernard Guillaumet	Rai 1	Television film
Piccolo mondo antico	2001	Franco Maironi	Canale 5	Television film
La guerra è finita	2002	Claudio Varzi	Rai 1	Television film
Le stagioni del cuore	2004	Sergio Valenti	Canale 5	Lead role
Dalida	2005	Luigi Tenco	Canale 5	Television film
Codice rosso	2006	Pietro Vega	Canale 5	Lead role
The Holy Family	2006	Saint Joseph	Canale 5	Television film
I Cesaroni	2008	Oreste	Canale 5	2 episodes
Pinocchio	2009	Carlo Collodi	Rai 1	Television film
Un Natale per due	2011	Claudio Colonna	Sky Cinema	Television film
Una grande famiglia	2012–2015	Edoardo Rengoni	Rai 1	Main role
Un Natale con i fiocchi	2012	Alex Morelli	Sky Cinema	Television film
The Bastards of Pizzofalcone	2017–2023	Giuseppe Lojacono	Rai 1	Lead role
Io ti cercherò	2020	Valerio Frediani	Rai 1	Lead role
Un professore	2021–present	Dante Balestra	Rai 1	Lead role
Guerrieri: La regola dell'equilibrio	2026	Guido Guerrieri	Rai 1	Lead role
