= The Worst Days =

2023 comedy-drama anthology film directed by Massimiliano Bruno and Edoardo Leo

- Italian: I peggiori giorni
- Directed by: Massimiliano Bruno; Edoardo Leo
- Written by: Edoardo Leo; Massimiliano Bruno; Marco Bonini; Beatrice Campagna; Andrea Bassi; Gianni Corsi; Salvatore Fazio; Herbert Simone Paragnani
- Produced by: Fulvio Lucisano; Federica Lucisano
- Starring: Edoardo Leo; Massimiliano Bruno; Anna Foglietta; Renato Carpentieri; Fabrizio Bentivoglio; Giuseppe Battiston; Claudia Pandolfi; Anna Ferzetti; Neri Marcorè; Ricky Memphis; Rocco Papaleo; Giovanni Storti
- Cinematography: Marco Bassano
- Edited by: Luciana Pandolfelli
- Music by: Maurizio Filardo; Gianluca Misiti
- Production companies: Italian International Film; Vision Distribution; Sky Italia
- Distributed by: Vision Distribution
- Release date: 14 August 2023 (Italy)
- Running time: 117 minutes
- Country: Italy
- Language: Italian

The Worst Days (Italian: I peggiori giorni) is a 2023 Italian comedy-drama anthology film directed by Massimiliano Bruno and Edoardo Leo. It is the sequel to The Best Days, which was released earlier the same year, and consists of four episodes set during Christmas, International Workers' Day, Ferragosto and Halloween.

== Plot ==
=== Christmas ===
On Christmas Eve, Flaminio invites his three children, Luca, Stefania and Alessandro, and their families to his villa. He announces that he urgently needs a kidney transplant, prompting his children to consider whether they are willing to donate a kidney. After secretly overhearing his children criticising him and recalling the harm he caused them in the past, Flaminio reveals that the transplant was a lie intended to test his children's character. The following day, the siblings return to apologise, only to find their father dead in his armchair.

=== International Workers' Day ===
On May 1, businessman Stefano Mazzuccato arrives at his company's office, where Antonio, a former employee who believes he was unfairly dismissed, confronts him while disguised as Che Guevara and armed with a pickaxe. Antonio demands compensation for his dismissal. Stefano reveals that his company has accumulated nine million euros in debt following the COVID-19 pandemic and that he came to the office intending to take his own life. After Antonio publicises the confrontation online, the police arrive. Feeling trapped by their circumstances, the two men decide to hang themselves together.

=== Ferragosto ===
During a summer holiday at a seaside resort, Flavia and Guido confront their neighbours, Vincenzo and Tiziana, about the alleged sexual harassment of their daughter Chiara by Vincenzo and Tiziana's sons, Justin and Achille. The accusations are supported by videos and messages shared in a group chat. Tiziana expresses shame and empathy, while Vincenzo dismisses the behaviour as a joke between teenagers. Chiara eventually appears and makes it clear that she does not welcome her parents' intervention.

=== Halloween ===
Vittorio, a depressed former magician, struggles to rebuild his life following the disappearance of his wife, Barbara. His daughter Matilde persuades him to perform at a private Halloween party for children, despite the date coinciding with the anniversary of his wife's disappearance. The party is hosted by wealthy businessman Gildo Falchetti, a former university acquaintance who had begun a relationship with Barbara shortly before her planned marriage to Vittorio. Their unresolved hostility resurfaces during the event. When Gildo attempts to humiliate Vittorio by demanding degrading performances, Vittorio turns the situation around with his professional skill, winning the sympathy of the audience. Matilde ends the day proud of her father.

== Cast ==
- Edoardo Leo as Alessandro Felici
- Massimiliano Bruno as Luca Felici
- Anna Foglietta as Stefania Felici
- Renato Carpentieri as Flaminio
- Fabrizio Bentivoglio as Stefano Mazzuccato
- Giuseppe Battiston as Antonio
- Claudia Pandolfi as Tiziana
- Anna Ferzetti as Flavia
- Neri Marcorè as Guido
- Ricky Memphis as Vincenzo
- Rocco Papaleo as Vittorio
- Giovanni Storti as Gildo Falchetti
- Sara Baccarini as Matilde
- Marco Bonini as Carlo
- Liliana Fiorelli as Giù
- Massimo Wertmüller as Dr. Vullo
- Francesco Leo as Justin
- Greta Favino as Chiara
- Nicola Cuneo as Achille
- Antonella Attili as Barbara
- Germana Cifani as Terry
- Urbano Lione as Brancale
- Tezeta Abraham as Camilla
- Federico Galante as Giulio
- Noli Sta Isabel as Romulo
- Laline Cafaro as Alice
