= Ninni Bruschetta =

Italian actor, director and screenwriter (born 1962)

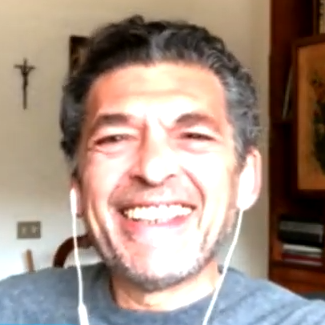
- Bruschetta in 2021
- Born: 6 January 1962 (age 64); Messina, Italy
- Occupations: Actor; writer; director
- Height: 1.73 m (5 ft 8 in)

Ninni Bruschetta (born Antonino Bruschetta; 6 January 1962) is an Italian actor, film director and screenwriter.

== Life and career ==
Born on 6 January 1962, in Messina, Bruschetta co-founded with Maurizio Puglisi "Nutrimenti terrestri", a stage company which primarily focused on subjects of social value, and was active both as an actor and a director. In 1987, he debuted as a screenwriter with the indie drama La gentilezza del tocco, and in 1989 he co-directed the indie film Private Screening. He is also very active as an actor in films and television series.

== Filmography ==
=== Film ===
Year	Title	Role(s)	Notes
1987	La gentilezza del tocco	Mario	
1989	Visioni private	Carlo	
1991	Ladri di futuro	Corrado	
1993	Libera	Pistoletta	Segment: "Aurora"
1994	Law of Courage	Deputy Prosecutor Di Salvo	
1995	Black Holes	First Client	
1997	Fiabe metropolitane	Francesco	
1999	Prima del tramonto	Domenico	
2000	One Hundred Steps	Anthony	
2000	First Light of Dawn	Mirko Zappalà	
2001	One Man Up	Genny	
2003	Lost Love	Luigi	
2003	I cinghiali di Portici	Ciro	
2004	The Vanity Serum	Vittorio Terracciano	
2004	The Life That I Want	Luca	
2006	Agente matrimoniale	Mimmo Nunnari	
2006	Golden Door	Italian Emigrant	Cameo appearance
2007	My Brother Is an Only Child	Secretary Bombacci	
2007	The Man of Glass	Bruno Cantone	
2009	La casa sulle nuvole	Bellini	
2009	The Red Shadows	TV1 Presenter	Cameo appearance
2010	Come Undone	Domenico's Brother	
2011	Boris: The Film	Duccio Patanè	
2011	Pasannante	Director Vignali	
2011	Make a Fake	Gallerist	
2012	To Rome with Love	Detective	Cameo appearance
2012	È nata una star?	Rasero	
2012	Tell No One	Rodolfo	
2012	La moglie del sarto	Councilor Cordaro	
2012	Viva l'Italia	Himself	Cameo appearance
2013	Out of the Blue	Adriano	
2013	Wannabe Widowed	Marcello Perlasca	
2013	The Mafia Kills Only in Summer	Fra Giacinto	
2014	The State-Mafia Pact	Theology Professor	
2015	Land of Saints	Domenico Mercuri	
2015	Nomi e cognomi	Mario De Libertis	
2016	Quo vado?	Minister Magnu	
2016	Quel bravo ragazzo	Enrico Greco	
2016	How to Grow Up Despite Your Parents	Igor Alessi	
2017	Murder Italian Style	Tour Operator	Cameo appearance
2018	Il vegetale	Bruno Rovazzi	
2018	Tu mi nascondi qualcosa	Vittorio	
2019	Tuttapposto	Giovanni Mancuso	
2020	Everything's Gonna Be Alright	The Producer	
2021	Nekoc so bili ljudje	Massimo	
2022	Gli anni belli	Eugenio	
2022	The Bone Breakers	Francesco	
2023	Quando	Professor Cocco	
2023	Io e mio fratello	Giuseppe	
2023	Il paese dei jeans in agosto	Faluccio Arato	
2023	In fuga con Babbo Natale		
2024	The Price of Nonna's Inheritance	Nunzio	
2025	Prophecy	Tizio	
2026	Limoni a Varsavia	Giuseppe Tassi	

=== Television ===
Year	Title	Role(s)	Notes
2002	La squadra	Mimmo Iovine	Recurring role; 4 episodes
2004	Paolo Borsellino	Ninni Cassarà	Two-parts television movie
2005	Distretto di Polizia	Giacomo's Father	Episode: "Padri e figli"
2006	R.I.S. – Delitti imperfetti	Sergio Bonezzi	Episode: "Testimone silenzioso"
2006	Attacco allo Stato	Spano	Television movie
2006	Un ciclone in famiglia	Lawyer	Episode: "Sesta puntata"
2006	Crimini	Merli	Episode: "Il covo di Teresa"
2006	Don Matteo	Vittorio Mella	Episode: "Sogni e bisogni"
2007	Il generale Dalla Chiesa	Pio La Torre	Two-parts television movie
2007–2022	Boris	Duccio Patanè	Main role; 47 episodes
2008	L'ultimo padrino	Pasquale Cafiero	Two-parts television movie
2008	Aldo Moro – Il presidente	Oreste Leonardi	Television movie
2009–2010	Squadra antimafia – Palermo oggi	Fabrizio "Alfiere" Lorri	Main role (season 1), recurring role (season 2); 10 episodes
2010	Lo scandalo della Banca Romana	Inspector Cavaterra	Television movie
2011	The Secret of Water	Sabino Tomei	Main role; 6 episodes
2011	La donna della domenica	Inspector De Palma	Television movie
2011	Don Matteo	Rino Torre	Episode: "Generazione Y"
2011–2012	Distretto di Polizia	Marco Gallo	Recurring role (season 11); 14 episodes
2011–2015	Fuoriclasse	Salvatore Lobascio	Main role; 28 episodes
2012	Mai per amore	Mr. Fossati	Episode: "La fuga di Teresa"
2012	Camera Café	'Giappone Ripieno' Owner	Episode: "L'ultima katana"
2013	Trilussa – Storia d'amore e di poesia	Director Malgesi	Two-parts television movie
2014	Gli anni spezzati	Antonio Allegra	Episode: "Il commissario"
2014	Le mani dentro la città	Filippo Diolosà	Main role; 12 episodes
2015	Ragion di Stato	General Ranieri	Television movie
2015	Questo è il mio paese	Cardi	Main role; 6 episodes
2015	The Candidate	Father Franco	Episode: "Conversione"
2016	Il sistema	Nicola Nardelli	Recurring role; 3 episodes
2016	Romanzo siciliano	Salvatore Buscemi	Main role; 8 episodes
2016	Un posto al sole	Gualtiero	Episode dated September 29, 2016
2017	L'isola di Pietro	Enrico Rovandi	Main role (season 1); 6 episodes
2017	Paolo Borsellino – Adesso tocca a me	Rino Germanà	Television movie
2018	The Immature: The Series	Gianni	Main role; 7 episodes
2018	Liberi sognatori	Nino	Episode: "Libero Grassi"
2018	La linea verticale	Giuseppe Barbieri	Main role; 8 episodes
2018–2023	The Bastards of Pizzofalcone	Giacomo Caruso	Recurring role; 6 episodes
2019	La stagione della caccia	Father Macaluso	Television movie
2019	Non ho niente da perdere	Valdorsi	Television movie
2019	Made in Italy	Pasquale Mastrangelo	Recurring role; 8 episodes
2020	Come una madre	Alberto	2 episodes
2020	La concedsione del telefono	Father Macaluso	Television movie
2021–present	Lolita Lobosco	Police Commissioner Iacovella	Main role; 12 episodes
2023	The Lions of Sicily	Baron Chiaramonte Bordonaro	Episode: "Episode 5"
2024	Viola come il mare	Leonardo Piazza	Main role; 12 episodes
2024	Il patriarca	Rais	Recurring role (season 2); 5 episodes
2024–2025	Màkari	Alfonso	2 episodes
2026	A testa alta – Il coraggio di una donna	Angelo Bodoni	Main role; 3 episodes
2026	The Law According to Lidia Poët	Giovanni Cantamessa	Main role (season 3); 5 episodes
