= List of 2019 box office number-one films in Italy =

The following is a list of 2019 box office number-one films in Italy.

== Number-one films ==
†	This implies the highest-grossing movie of the year.

#	Date	Film	Gross	Notes
1	January 6, 2019	Aquaman	US$260,724	
2	January 13, 2019	Non ci resta che il crimine	US$2,283,768	
3	January 20, 2019	Mia and the White Lion	US$2,193,059	
4	January 27, 2019	Creed II	US$4,211,550	
5	February 3, 2019	How to Train Your Dragon: The Hidden World	US$3,615,053	
6	February 10, 2019	The Mule	US$2,496,105	
7	February 17, 2019	When Mom Is Away	US$2,158,751	
8	February 24, 2019	When Mom Is Away	US$1,294,411	
9	March 3, 2019	Dragon Ball Super: Broly	US$1,894,810	
10	March 10, 2019	Captain Marvel	US$4,576,917	
11	March 17, 2019	Captain Marvel	US$2,330,340	
12	March 24, 2019	Five Feet Apart	US$1,515,910	
13	March 31, 2019	Dumbo	US$3,742,611	
14	April 7, 2019	Dumbo	US$3,291,098	
15	April 14, 2019	After	US$3,714,875	
16	April 21, 2019	Ma cosa ci dice il cervello	US$1,259,077	
17	April 28, 2019	Avengers: Endgame	US$19,570,574	
18	May 5, 2019	Avengers: Endgame	US$4,397,270	
19	May 12, 2019	Detective Pikachu	US$179,162	
20	May 19, 2019	John Wick: Chapter 3 – Parabellum	US$1,716,049	
21	May 26, 2019	Aladdin	US$6,319,712	
22	June 2, 2019	Aladdin	—	
23	June 9, 2019	The Secret Life of Pets 2	US$1,172,082	
24	June 16, 2019	The Secret Life of Pets 2	US$733,722	
25	June 23, 2019	The Professor	US$586,043	
26	June 30, 2019	Toy Story 4	US$1,936,386	
27	July 7, 2019	Annabelle Comes Home	US$1,175,125	
28	July 14, 2019	Spider-Man: Far From Home	US$4,277,622	
29	July 21, 2019	Spider-Man: Far From Home	US$4,258,903	
30	July 28, 2019	Men in Black: International	US$1,256,267	
31	August 4, 2019	Men in Black: International	US$475,130	
32	August 11, 2019	Hobbs & Shaw	US$2,243,066	
33	August 18, 2019	Hobbs & Shaw	US$1,031,716	
34	August 25, 2019	The Lion King †	US$12,212,862	
35	September 1, 2019	The Lion King †	US$6,983,947	
36	September 8, 2019	It Chapter Two	US$5,450,740	
37	September 15, 2019	It Chapter Two	US$1,602,828	
38	September 22, 2019	Once Upon a Time in Hollywood	US$5,003,542	
39	September 29, 2019	Once Upon a Time in Hollywood	US$2,357,142	
40	October 6, 2019	Joker	US$6,876,614	
41	October 13, 2019	Joker	US$6,677,726	
42	October 20, 2019	Maleficent: Mistress of Evil	US$5,223,918	
43	October 27, 2019	Maleficent: Mistress of Evil	US$2,902,501	
44	November 3, 2019	The Addams Family	US$3,948,089	
45	November 10, 2019	Hustlers	US$1,721,942	
46	November 17, 2019	Ford v Ferrari	US$1,386,774	
47	November 24, 2019	Cetto c'è, senzadubbiamente	US$2,733,013	
48	December 1, 2019	Frozen 2	US$8,043,806	
49	December 8, 2019	Frozen 2	US$4,065,490	
50	December 15, 2019	Frozen 2	US$1,945,528	
51	December 22, 2019	Star Wars: The Rise of Skywalker	US$4,543,770	
52	December 29, 2019	Jumanji: The Next Level	US$5,600,051	
