= Ignorance Is Bliss (film) =

- Film poster
- Italian: Beata ignoranza
- Directed by: Massimiliano Bruno
- Written by: Massimiliano Bruno; Herbert Simone Paragnani; Gianni Corsi
- Produced by: Fulvio Lucisano; Federica Lucisano
- Starring: Marco Giallini; Alessandro Gassmann; Valeria Bilello; Carolina Crescentini; Teresa Romagnoli
- Cinematography: Alessandro Pesci
- Edited by: Consuelo Catucci
- Music by: Maurizio Filardo
- Distributed by: 01 Distribution
- Release date: 23 February 2017 (Italy)
- Running time: 102 minutes
- Country: Italy
- Language: Italian

Ignorance Is Bliss (Italian: Beata ignoranza) is a 2017 Italian comedy film directed by Massimiliano Bruno. The film received mixed reviews from critics.

== Premise ==
The film revolves around Marco and Alessandro, two teachers in a liceo.

== Cast ==
- Marco Giallini as Ernesto
- Alessandro Gassmann as Filippo
- Valeria Bilello as Margherita
- Carolina Crescentini as Marianna
- Teresa Romagnoli as Nina
- Giuseppe Ragone as Gianluca
- Malvina Ruggiano as Costanza
- Emanuela Fanelli as Iris
- Luca Angeletti as Nazi
- Luciano Scarpa as Mayer
- Teodoro Giambanco as Lorenzo
- Susy Laude as Roberta Zaccarelli
- Michela Andreozzi as Dr. Andreoli
- Alessandro Di Carlo as the janitor
- Pietro De Silva as Ulderico
- Guglielmo Poggi as Paolo Binetti
- Roberta Fiorentini as grandma Binetti
- Massimiliano Bruno as Osvaldo
- Massimo De Lorenzo as principal Meloni
- Maria Vittoria Argenti as Chiara Zaccarelli
- Gabriele Berti as Attanasio
- Riccardo D'Alessandro as Pietro Semprini

== Accolades ==
- 2017 – Nastro d'Argento
  - Nomination for Best Screenplay
  - Nomination for Best Actor (Marco Giallini and Alessandro Gassmann)
- 2017 – Globo d'oro
  - Nomination for Best Comedy
