= Gioele Dix =

Italian actor and comedian

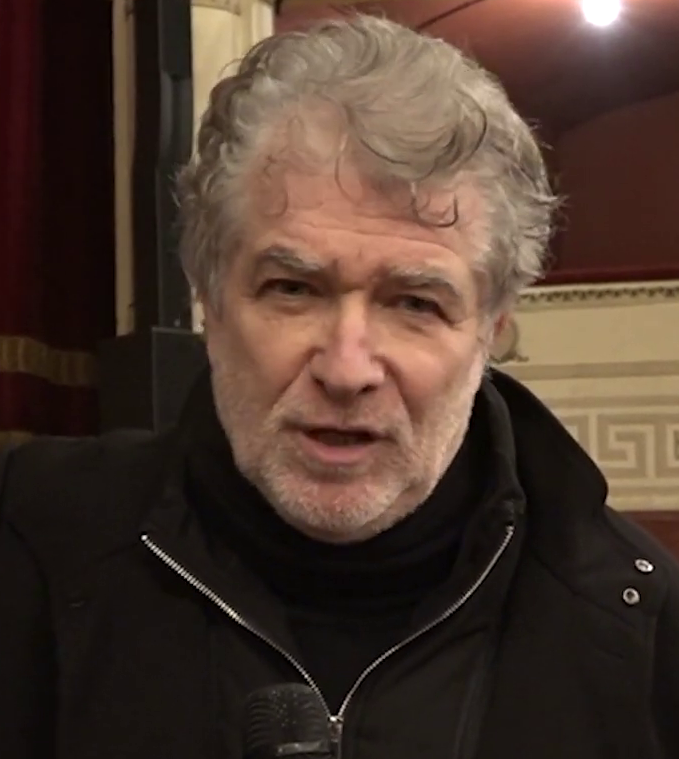
- Dix in 2023
- Born: David Ottolenghi; 3 January 1956 (age 70); Milan, Italy
- Occupations: Actor; comedian
- Website: www.gioeledix.it

David Ottolenghi (born 3 January 1956), known by the pseudonym Gioele Dix, is an Italian actor and comedian.

== Life ==
Born in Milan to a family of Jewish descent, Gioele Dix began his theatrical career at the end of the 1970s, promoting and animating the Milan stage company Teatro degli Eguali. Among the numerous plays he took part in are: A Midsummer Night's Dream, a rock musical from Shakespeare directed by Gabriele Salvatores (who went on to direct a film adaptation); A Martian in Rome by Ennio Flaiano, directed by Antonio Salines; two stagings of Molière's The Imaginary Invalid and Tartuffe with veteran actor Franco Parenti. Intending to pursue a career as a stand-up comedian, he appeared at the Derby Club and the Zelig, important historical Milan cabarets, reaching fame in 1988 in the TV variety show Cocco on Rai 2 with the character of a permanently enraged car driver.

Io sono un automobilista, ed essendo un automobilista sono sempre costantemente incazzato come una bestia!!

I'm a car driver and, being a car driver, I'm always constantly furiously pissed off!!

— Gioele Dix

In the 1990s he confirmed his popularity as a stage actor, as well as a playwright, in a number of works and on TV, but often also as a comedian sending up and imitating renowned soccer players in prime-time sports shows.

In the 2000s, Dix had various movie engagements and filmed for the national TV together with Giorgio Albertazzi in 2004. Among the many theatrical works, he interpreted Cuori pazzi by F.T Altan (2000), The Libertine by E.E. Schmitt together with Ottavia Piccolo (2001) where he is the first Italian man playing naked, Corto Maltese from scripts by Hugo Pratt and music by Paolo Conte. He the returned to the stage with Edipo.com, directed by Sergio Fantoni (2003); then La Bibbia ha quasi sempre ragione with Cesare Picco at the piano (2004), all of them plays enhancing the narrative dimension of the story, thus exploiting Dix's natural talent as a raconteur.

In 2007, he was engaged in the cast of Zelig (a popular comedy TV show) as one of the comedians, interpreting his now famous caricature of the "permanently enraged car driver".

In 2008, he staged Tutta colpa di Garibaldi with scripts by himself, Sergio Fantoni and Nicola Fano, directed by Fantoni; he followed with the play Dixplay by himself, with the participation of Bebo Best Baldan.

== Filmography ==
- Crimini - Disegno di sangue, directed by Gianfranco Cabiddu (Rai 2)
- Tracce di vita amorosa, directed by Peter Del Monte (1990)
- Per non dimenticare, directed by Massimo Martelli (1992)
- Tre passi nel delitto, directed by Fabrizio Laurenti (1993)
- Bidoni, directed by Felice Farina (1995)
- Olimpo Lupo, cronista di nera, directed by Fabrizio Laurenti (1995)
- Uno di noi, (1996)
- All the Moron's Men (1999)
- Se fossi in te, directed by Giulio Manfredonia (2001)
- Cerco lavoro, directed by Fratelli Frazzi (2002)
- Marcinelle, directed by Vincenzo Verdecchi (2004)
- Ora e per sempre, directed by Vincenzo Verdecchi (2004)
- Ricomincio da me, directed by Rossella Izzo (2005)
- A voce alta, directed by Vincenzo Verdecchi (2006)
- Tutti i rumori del mondo, directed by Tiziana Aristarco (2007)
- Happily Mixed Up, directed by Massimiliano Bruno (2014)
- We Still Talk, directed by Pupi Avati (2021)

== Theatre ==
- La mia patente non scade mai, directed by Gioele Dix (1988–89)
- Mai a stomaco vuoto, directed by Gioele Dix (1990)
- Antologia di Edipo, directed by Gioele Dix (1991–92)
- Anna, directed by Gioele Dix (1992–93)
- Sto ristrutturando, directed by Gioele Dix (1993–94)
- Questa estate, directed by Gioele Dix (1994)
- Cinque Dix, directed by Gioele Dix (1995)
- Mi sembra che andiamo bene, directed by Gioele Dix (1997–98)
- L'uomo degli appuntamenti, directed by Gioele Dix (1998)
- Recital, directed by Gioele Dix (1999)
- Agamennone, directed by Giorgio Gallione (2000)
- Cuori pazzi, directed by Giorgio Gallione (2000–01)
- Il Libertino, directed by Sergio Fantoni (2001–02)
- Mappa del nuovo mondo, readings from Derek Walcott, directed by Piero Maccarinelli (2002)
- A posto così, directed by Gioele Dix (2002)
- Corto Maltese, directed by Giorgio Gallione (2003–04)
- Edipo.com, directed by Sergio Fantoni (2003–05)
- La Bibbia ha (quasi) sempre ragione, directed by Andree Ruth Shamma (2003–07)
- Grand Tour, travel chronicles of illustrious people, directed by Gioele Dix (2004)
- Amore a prima vista, readings of poems by Wisława Szymborska (2004)
- I ragazzi hanno orecchie, fables by Fernand Deligny, directed by Gioele Dix (2005)
- Meglio il nuovo oggi (L'innovazione fa spettacolo), directed by Serena Sinigaglia (2006)
- Tutta colpa di Garibaldi, directed by Sergio Fantoni (2008)
- Dixplay, directed by Giancarlo Bozzo (2008)

== Bibliography ==
Dix has also published some comedic books:

- Il manuale del vero automobilista (M.M., 1991)
- Cinque Dix (Baldini&Castoldi, 1995)
- La Bibbia ha quasi sempre ragione (Mondadori, 2003)
- Manuale dell'automobilista incazzato (Mondadori, 2007)
