= C'era una volta il crimine =

2022 comedy crime film directed by Massimiliano Bruno

- Directed by: Massimiliano Bruno
- Screenplay by: Massimiliano Bruno; Alessandro Aronadio; Andrea Bassi; Renato Sannio
- Produced by: Federica Lucisano; Fulvio Lucisano
- Starring: Marco Giallini; Giampaolo Morelli; Gianmarco Tognazzi; Carolina Crescentini; Massimiliano Bruno; Edoardo Leo; Giulia Bevilacqua; Ilenia Pastorelli
- Cinematography: Marco Pieroni
- Edited by: Luciana Pandolfelli
- Music by: Maurizio Filardo
- Production companies: Italian International Film; Rai Cinema
- Distributed by: 01 Distribution
- Release date: 10 March 2022 (Italy)
- Running time: 100 minutes
- Country: Italy
- Language: Italian

C'era una volta il crimine ("One Upon a Time in Crime") is a 2022 Italian comedy crime film written and directed by Massimiliano Bruno. It is the third and final installment in the film trilogy that began with All You Need Is Crime (2019) and continued with Ritorno al crimine (2021).

== Cast ==
- Marco Giallini as Moreno Filipponi
- Giampaolo Morelli as Claudio Ranieri
- Gianmarco Tognazzi as Giuseppe
- Carolina Crescentini as Adele
- Massimiliano Bruno as Gianfranco
- Edoardo Leo as Renatino
- Giulia Bevilacqua as Lorella
- Ilenia Pastorelli as Sabrina
- Rolando Ravello as Sandro Pertini
- Massimiliano Vado as Ferdinando Magistrelli
- Christoph Hülsen as Beiersdorfer
- Duccio Camerini as Benito Mussolini
- Eugenio Krauss as Kuntz
- Marius Bizău as Dieter

== Release ==
The film was released theatrically in Italy on 10 March 2022.
