= Ritorno al crimine =

2021 comedy crime film directed by Massimiliano Bruno

- Directed by: Massimiliano Bruno
- Screenplay by: Alessandro Aronadio; Andrea Bassi; Massimiliano Bruno; Renato Sannio
- Story by: Andrea Bassi; Massimiliano Bruno
- Produced by: Fulvio Lucisano; Federica Lucisano
- Starring: Marco Giallini; Alessandro Gassmann; Edoardo Leo; Gianmarco Tognazzi; Carlo Buccirosso; Giulia Bevilacqua
- Cinematography: Fabio Zamarion
- Edited by: Luciana Pandolfelli
- Music by: Maurizio Filardo
- Production companies: Italian International Film; Rai Cinema
- Release date: 12 July 2021 (Italy)
- Running time: 105 minutes
- Country: Italy
- Language: Italian

Ritorno al crimine ("Back to Crime") is a 2021 Italian comedy crime film written and directed by Massimiliano Bruno. It is the sequel to the 2019 film All You Need Is Crime and is followed by C'era una volta il crimine (2022), the third and final installment in the film trilogy.

== Cast ==
- Marco Giallini as Moreno Filipponi
- Alessandro Gassmann as Sebastiano
- Edoardo Leo as Renatino
- Gianmarco Tognazzi as Giuseppe
- Carlo Buccirosso as Massimo Ranieri
- Giulia Bevilacqua as Lorella
- Massimiliano Bruno as Gianfranco
- Gianfranco Gallo as Gennarino 'O Rattuso
- Loretta Goggi as Sabrina
- Marco Esposito as 'O Mammone
- Marianna di Maso as Teresa
- Corinne Cléry as Countess Roccapadula
- Antonio Gargiulo as Van Gogh
- Nicola Pistoia as Kalashnikov
- Angelo Orlando as Trikke Trakke
- Ninetto Davoli as Er Saetta
- Roberto Della Casa as Severino
- Roberto Oliveri as Semprefresco
- Achille Lauro as himself

== Release ==
The film's original theatrical release was scheduled for 12 March 2020. Following delays associated with the COVID-19 pandemic, the release date was postponed several times. It eventually premiered on Sky Cinema on 12 July 2021, and was also made available for streaming on Now.
