= Viva l'Italia =

- Directed by: Massimiliano Bruno
- Written by: Massimiliano Bruno; Edoardo Maria Falcone
- Produced by: Fulvio e Federica Lucisano
- Starring: Raoul Bova; Alessandro Gassmann; Michele Placido; Ambra Angiolini; Edoardo Leo; Maurizio Mattioli; Rocco Papaleo
- Cinematography: Alessandro Pesci
- Music by: Giuliano Taviani; Carmelo Travia
- Release date: 25 October 2012
- Running time: 100 minutes
- Country: Italy
- Language: Italian

Viva l'Italia (lit. 'Long live Italy') is a 2012 Italian comedy film written and directed by Massimiliano Bruno. In the film, politician Michele Spagnolo loses the ability to lie because of a stroke. The strange situation leads to dire consequences. The film was shot in and around Rome.

== Premise ==
The film revolves around the Spagnolo family. Michele Spagnolo is the leader of the political party Viva l'Italia. Dire consequences arise when he loses the ability to lie because of a stroke.

== Cast ==
- Raoul Bova as Riccardo Spagnolo
- Ambra Angiolini as Susanna Spagnolo
- Michele Placido as Michele Spagnolo
- Alessandro Gassmann as Valerio Spagnolo
- Rocco Papaleo as Tony
- Edoardo Leo as Marco
- Maurizio Mattioli as Antonio
- Rolando Ravello as Giansanti
- Sarah Felberbaum as Valentina
- Isabelle Adriani as paziente ospedale
- Imma Piro as Giovanna
- Camilla Filippi as Elena
- Nicola Pistoia as Roberto D'Onofrio
- Isa Barzizza as Marisa
- Sergio Fiorentini as Cesare
- Remo Remotti as Annibale
- Massimiliano Vado as Max
- Samantha Fantauzzi as Sonia
- Edoardo Maria Falcone as Stalker
- Barbara Folchitto as Anna
- Massimiliano Bruno as TV presenter
- Patrizia Pellegrino as Talk Show presenter
- Frankie HI-NRG MC as Mc
- Ninni Bruschetta as himself
- Paola Minaccioni as Logopedist
- Edoardo Pesce as Mazzone
- Stefano Fresi as Santini
- Valerio Aprea as Director
- Lucia Ocone as Waitress
- Cristiano Malgioglio as himself
- Alessandro Mannarino as himself
