= Lucia Ocone =

Italian actress (born 1974)

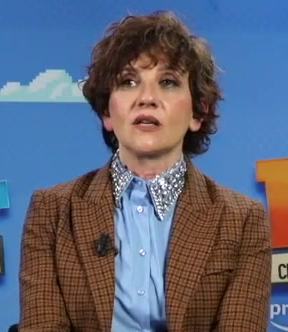
- Born: 3 May 1974 (age 52); Albano Laziale, Italy
- Occupations: Actress; comedian
- Years active: 1992–present

Lucia Ocone (born 3 May 1974) is an Italian actress and comedian.

== Life and career ==
Born in Albano Laziale, at young age Ocone moved to Rome to study acting, following courses held by Francesca De Sapio and Lucilla Lupaioli. In 1992, she made her television debut in Gianni Boncompagni's variety show Bulli e pupe, and later appeared in Boncompagni's shows Non è la RAI (1992–4), where she started playing her first comedic sketches, and Macao (1997). She had her breakout in 2002, when she replaced Paola Cortellesi as comedian and impersonator in the Gialappa's Band comedy show Mai dire domenica. After appearing in other Gialappa's Band shows, in 2005 she joined the cast of Quelli che... il Calcio, where she stayed until 2009, and where eventually returned in the 2015–16 season. During her run in the show Ocone played over 50 characters.

As an actress, Ocone appeared in numerous films, television series and stage plays. In 2022, she dubbed Zee in the Italian version of The Ice Age Adventures of Buck Wild.

== Filmography ==
=== Film ===
Year	Title	Role	Notes
2001	Our Tropical Island	Cashier	Cameo appearance
2007	I Trust You	Susanna Besozzi	
2009	Generation 1000 Euros	Administration employee	Cameo appearance
2010	Men vs. Women	Monica	
2010	The Santa Claus Gang	Marta	
2011	Women vs. Men	Monica	
2011	Escort in Love	Tiziana	
2012	The Immature: The Trip	Sonia	
2012	Viva l'Italia	Spagnolo's housemaid	
2013	Niente può fermarci	Linda	
2014	Blame Freud	Adele	
2014	La buca	Sissi	
2014	Ladiesroom	Anna	Short film
2016	Poveri ma ricchi	Loredana Bertocchi	
2017	Poveri ma ricchissimi	Loredana Bertocchi	
2018	Put Grandma in the Freezer	Rossana	
2018	One of the Family	Aunt Angela	
2019	Se mi vuoi bene	Loredana	
2021	Help! My In-Laws Are Vampires!	Brunilde	
2022	I cassamortari	Maria	
2022	The Ice Age Adventures of Buck Wild	Zee (voice)	Italian dub
2022	A Breath of Fresh Air	Teresa	

=== Television ===
Year	Title	Role	Notes
1992–1994	Non è la RAI	Herself / Imitator	Reality show (season 2-3)
1997–1998	Macao	Herself / Various	Variety show
2002–2004	Mai dire domenica	Herself / Co-host	Satirical program
2003–2004	Mai dire Grande Fratello	Herself / Co-host	Satirical program
2004	Nessundorma	Various	Main role
2004	La omicidi	Elettra Crocetta	Main role
2004–2005	Due sul divano	Herself / Co-host	Talk show
2005	Una famiglia in giallo	Serena Sardi	Main role
2005–2021	Quelli che... il Calcio	Herself / Various	Variety show
2007	7 vite	Giovanna	Recurring role (season 1)
2009–2011	Il commissario Manara	Serena Sardi	Main role
2011	Agata e Ulisse	Federica	Television film
2011	I liceali	Maristella Amoruso	Main role (season 3)
2011–2012	Camera Café	Carlotta Russo	Recurring role (season 5)
2015	Tutti insieme all'improvviso	Laura	Episode: "Test"
2019	Stati generali	Herself / Co-host	Satirical program
2023	Prova prova sa sa	Herself / Contestant	Game show (season 2)
2024	LOL - Chi ride è fuori	Herself / Contestant	Reality show (season 4)
