= Le stagioni del cuore (TV series) =

- Starring: Alessandro Gassman; Anna Valle; Arnaldo Ninchi; Paolo Seganti; Martina Stella; Andrea Bruschi; Eliana Miglio; Ugo Conti; Antonella Attili; Gea Lionello; Damiela Fazzolari; Ana Caterina Morariu; Valeria Milillo
- Country of origin: Italy
- No. of seasons: 1
- No. of episodes: 12

Production
- Running time: 100 min.

Original release
- Network: Canale 5
- Release: 2004

Le stagioni del cuore is an Italian television series.

== See also ==
- List of Italian television series
