= Just Believe =

2018 comedy film

- Directed by: Alessandro Aronadio
- Screenplay by: Alessandro Aronadio; Valerio Cilio; Edoardo Leo; Renato Sannio
- Produced by: Federica Lucisano; Fulvio Lucisano
- Starring: Edoardo Leo; Margherita Buy; Giuseppe Battiston
- Cinematography: Timoty Aliprandi
- Edited by: Pietro Morana
- Music by: Santi Pulvirenti
- Release date: 2018
- Language: Italian

Just Believe (Italian: Io c'è) is a 2018 Italian comedy film co-written and directed by Alessandro Aronadio and starring Edoardo Leo, Margherita Buy and Giuseppe Battiston.

== Cast ==
- Edoardo Leo as Massimo Alberti
- Margherita Buy as Adriana Alberti
- Giuseppe Battiston as Marco Cilio
- Giulia Michelini as Teresa
- Massimiliano Bruno as Teodoro
- Lorenzo Gioielli as Giulio
- Gegia as Suor Assunta
- Gisella Burinato as Nun
- Aleksandar Cvjetković as Miloš
- Franco Pinelli as Padre Giuseppe
- Gladis Robles as Marylou
- Ana Brigitte Fernandez as Marcela
- Giorgio Musumeci as Filippo
- Vittorio Hamarz Vasfi as Imam
- Andrea Purgatori as Rabbi

== Production ==
A satire about religion, Aronadio got inspiration for the film from the Rocco Papaleo's character in his previous work Ears; he also cited Monty Python and The Simpsons as major influences for the script.

Principal photography wrapped in Rome in December 2017. The film was produced by Fulvio and Federica Lucisano for Italian International Film, with Vision Distribution.

== Reception ==
Boris Sollazzo described the film as a "secular and spiritual film, a funny and profound comedy. One of those that we always look for, that we demand and then, when they come, sometimes we fail to appreciate"

The film was nominated for two Nastro d'Argento awards, for best actor in a comedy film (Edoardo Leo) and best script.
