= Io sono Tempesta =

2018 film directed by Daniele Luchetti

- Directed by: Daniele Luchetti
- Written by: Daniele Luchetti; Sandro Petraglia; Giulia Calenda
- Produced by: Marco Chimenz; Giovanni Stabilini; Riccardo Tozzi
- Starring: Marco Giallini; Elio Germano; Eleonora Danco
- Cinematography: Luca Bigazzi
- Production company: Rai Cinema
- Distributed by: 01 Distribution
- Release date: 12 April 2018
- Running time: 97 minutes
- Country: Italy
- Language: Italian

Io sono Tempesta (I am Tempesta) is a 2018 Italian comedy-drama film directed by Daniele Luchetti, starring Marco Giallini and Elio Germano.

== Plot ==
Numa Tempesta is a fascinating, charismatic, and yet ruthless businessman, who will stop at nothing to close his deals, even if it means bending the law. That's until the law catches him and accuses him of tax evasion: in order to avoid prison, Numa is sentenced to a year of community service in a homeless shelter. Once there, Numa cannot conduct any kind of business, but he must close the deal of the century or lose his whole fortune.

== Cast ==
- Marco Giallini as Numa Tempesta
- Elio Germano as Bruno
- Eleonora Danco as Angela
- Marcello Fonte as Il Greco

== Awards and nominations ==
=== Nastro d'Argento Awards (2018) ===
- Nomination for Nastro d'Argento for Best Actor in a Comedy to Marco Giallini
