= Marco Giallini =

Italian actor (born 1963)

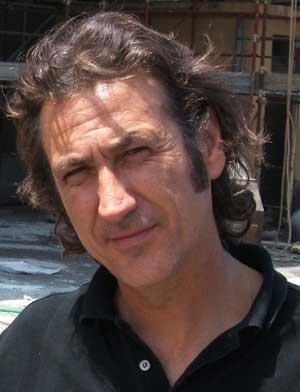
- Giallini in 2006
- Born: 4 April 1963 (age 63); Rome, Italy
- Occupation: Actor

Marco Giallini (born 4 April 1963) is an Italian actor.

== Life and career ==
Born in Rome, Giallini is the son of a housewife and a furnace labourer. After attending the Accademia Nazionale di Arte Drammatica Silvio D'Amico, he began acting on stage, working with, among others, Arnoldo Foà and Angelo Orlando. He made his film debut in 1995, in Orlando's comedy film L'anno prossimo vado a letto alle dieci. He appeared in several TV series and was co-protagonist, alongside Valerio Mastandrea, of the Rai Tre sitcom Buttafuori. He is also very active in music videos and short films.

In 2012 Giallini won the Nastro d'Argento award for best supporting actor for his performance in ACAB - All Cops Are Bastards. The same year he won the Ciak d'oro as personality of the year.

Giallini was married to his wife Loredana for 25 years, and they had two children. He has remained a widower since July 2011, when his wife succumbed to cerebral hemorrhage.

== Filmography ==
=== Film ===
Year	Title	Role(s)	Notes
1986	Grandi magazzini	Marketing employee	Uncredited
1987	Rorret	Cecilia's classmate	Cameo appearance
1995	L'anno prossimo vado a letto alle dieci	Policeman #2	Cameo appearance
1998	Kaputt Mundi	Enzo Di Girolamo	
1998	The Scent of the Night	Maurizio Leggeri	
1998	I fobici	Stefano	Segment: "Tutto 'n tic"
1998	Barbara	Pino	
2000	Picasso's Face	Federico	
2000	Almost Blue	Sarrina	
2001	Tre punto sei	Dante	
2002	I Am Emma	Roberto	
2003	B.B. e il cormorano	Piero	
2003	The Fugitive	Beniamino Rossini	
2003	Andata e ritorno	Marco	
2004	The Vanity Serum	Michele Benda	
2004	Don't Move	Manlio	
2005	Amatemi	The Married Man	
2006	The Family Friend	Attanasio	
2007	Basette	Franco	Short film
2009	Meno male che ci sei	Federico	
2010	Me, Them and Lara	Luigi Mascolo	
2010	Love & Slaps	Duccio	
2011	All at Sea	Maurizio	
2012	ACAB: All Cops Are Bastards	Mazinga	
2012	A Flat for Three	Domenico Segato	
2012	A Perfect Family	Fortunato	
2013	Tutti contro tutti	Sergio	
2013	Out of the Blue	Enzo Brighi	
2014	La donna giusta	Police officer	Short film
2014	Blame Freud	Francesco Taramelli	
2014	Happily Mixed Up	Nazareno	
2014	Ogni maledetto Natale	Fano / Pierre Silvestri	
2015	God Willing	Tommaso De Luca	
2015	Storie sospese	Thomas	
2015	Them Who?	Marcello	
2016	Solo	Mauro	
2016	Perfect Strangers	Rocco	
2017	Ignorance Is Bliss	Ernesto	
2017	The Place	Ettore	
2018	Io sono Tempesta	Numa Tempesta	
2018	Forgive Us Our Debts	Franco	
2019	All You Need Is Crime	Moreno Filipponi	
2019	Domani è un altro giorno	Giuliano	
2019	Il grande salto	Boss	Cameo appearance
2020	È per il tuo bene	Arturo	
2020	Villetta con ospiti	Giorgio	
2021	Ritorno al crimine	Moreno Filipponi	
2021	Io sono Babbo Natale	Ettore Magni	
2022	C'era una volta il crimine	Moreno Filipponi	
2022	La mia ombra è tua	Vittorio	
2022	Il principe di Roma	Bartolomeo	
2025	Madly	Professore	
2025	The Forbidden City	Annibale	

=== Television ===
Year	Title	Role(s)	Notes
1999	Operazione Odissea	Saverio Ceccarelli / Agamennone	Television film
2002	Gli insoliti ignoti	Ruggero Di Fiore	Television film
2005	Grandi domani	Dante Salimbene	Lead role
2006	Buttafuori	Sergej	Main role
2007	Medicina generale	Dr. Alfredo Danzi	Main role (season 1)
2008	Fuga per la libertà: L'aviatore	Osvaldo	Television film
2008–2010	Romanzo criminale – La serie	Il Terribile	Main role (season 1); guest (season 2)
2009	Il mostro di Firenze	Ruggero Perugini	Main role
2009–2010	La nuova squadra	Andrea Lopez	Main role (season 2); guest (season 3)
2010	Crimini	Vincenzo Tagliaferro	Episode: "Little Dream"
2010	Boris	Valerio Zanetti	Recurring role (season 3)
2016–present	Rocco Schiavone	Rocco Schiavone	Lead role
2025	Public Disorder	Ivano "Mazinga" Valenti	Lead role

=== Music videos ===
Year	Title	Artist(s)	Notes
1997	"Quelli che benpensano"	Frankie Hi-NRG MC	
2005	"Fammi entrare"	Marina Rei	
2007	"Torno subito"	Max Pezzali	
2007	"Gino e l'Alfetta"	Daniele Silvestri	
2008	"Mezzo pieno o mezzo vuoto"	Max Pezzali	
2008	"Ritornerò"	Max Pezzali	
2012	"I rischi della notte"	Duke Montana	
2018	"Due destini"	Tiromancino, Alessandra Amoroso	
2018	"La dieta"	Luca Barbarossa	
2020	"22 settembre"	Ultimo	

== Awards and nominations ==
Year	Award	Category	Work	Result	Ref.
2023	Nastri d'Argento Grandi Serie	Best Actor	Rocco Schiavone	Nominated	
