= Blame Freud =

- Theatrical release poster
- Directed by: Paolo Genovese
- Starring: Marco Giallini; Vittoria Puccini; Anna Foglietta; Vinicio Marchioni; Laura Adriani; Claudia Gerini; Alessandro Gassmann
- Cinematography: Fabrizio Lucci
- Edited by: Consuelo Catucci
- Music by: Maurizio Filardo
- Distributed by: Medusa Film
- Release dates: 20 January 2014 (Rome premiere); 23 January 2014
- Running time: 120 minutes
- Country: Italy
- Language: Italian

Blame Freud (Italian: Tutta colpa di Freud) is a 2014 Italian comedy film written and directed by Paolo Genovese.

It was a box office hit, grossing over 8 million euros. The theme song "Tutta colpa di Freud" by Daniele Silvestri won the Ciak d'oro for best original song.

== Plot ==
Francesco is a psychologist who loves the theories of Sigmund Freud, who finds himself alone with three daughters: Marta, Sara, and Emma. Francesco, who is an expert analysis of sex, begins to hate Freud, because it turns out that the daughters have a complicated love life: one is a lesbian, another still loves an old man over thirty years older than her, while the last is closed in on herself.

== Cast ==
- Marco Giallini as Francesco
- Anna Foglietta as Sara
- Vittoria Puccini as Marta
- Vinicio Marchioni as Fabio
- Laura Adriani as Emma
- Daniele Liotti as Luca
- Alessandro Gassman as Alessandro
- Giulia Bevilacqua as Barbara
- Edoardo Leo as Roberto
- Claudia Gerini as Claudia
- Paolo Calabresi as Enrico
- Dario Bandiera as Ivano
- Maurizio Mattioli as Doorman
- Francesco Apolloni as Barista
- Alessia Barela as Laura
- Gianmarco Tognazzi as Andrea
- Michela Andreozzi as Professor Macro
- Lucia Ocone as Adele
