= Dark Glasses =

2022 film by Dario Argento

- Theatrical release poster
- Italian: Occhiali neri
- Directed by: Dario Argento
- Written by: Dario Argento; Franco Ferrini; Carlo Lucarelli
- Produced by: Conchita Airoldi; Laurentina Guidotti; Brahim Chioua; Noémie Devide; Vincent Maraval
- Starring: Ilenia Pastorelli; Asia Argento
- Cinematography: Matteo Cocco
- Edited by: Flora Volpelière
- Music by: Arnaud Rebotini
- Production companies: Urania Pictures; Getaway Films; Rai Cinema
- Distributed by: Vision Distribution (Italy); Canal+ (France)
- Release dates: 11 February 2022 (Berlinale); 24 February 2022 (Italy); 6 April 2023 (France)
- Running time: 90 minutes
- Countries: Italy; France
- Language: Italian
- Box office: $228,347

Dark Glasses (Italian: Occhiali neri, lit. 'Black Glasses', French: Lunettes noires) is a 2022 horror film co-written and directed by Dario Argento, in his first directorial work since Dracula 3D (2012). From a screenplay written by Argento with Franco Ferrini and Carlo Lucarelli, Dark Glasses stars Ilenia Pastorelli as an Italian escort who is attacked and blinded by a serial killer in an attempted murder. While escaping the attack by car, she meets a young Chinese boy (Andrea Zhang) who assists her in her lack of sight. Argento's daughter, Asia Argento, appears in the film, and also serves as the film's associate producer.

An international co-production of Italy and France, Dark Glasses premiered at the 72nd Berlin International Film Festival on 11 February 2022. It was released theatrically in Italy on 24 February 2022 by Vision Distribution.

== Cast ==
- Ilenia Pastorelli as Diana
- Asia Argento as Rita
- Andrea Gherpelli as Matteo
- Mario Pirrello as Chief Inspector Aleardi
- Maria Rosaria Russo as Inspector Bajani
- Gennaro Iaccarino as Inspector Baldacci
- Xinyu Zhang as Chin

== Production ==
The idea for Dark Glasses dates back to 2002, with Vittorio Cecchi Gori originally set to serve as the film's producer. Following the bankruptcy of Cecchi Gori's company, the script was shelved until Dario Argento's daughter, Asia Argento, rediscovered it while writing her 2021 autobiography Anatomy of a Wild Heart.

French electronic music duo Daft Punk was initially attached to compose the score, but were replaced by Arnaud Rebotini after breaking up in 2021.

== Release ==
Dark Glasses had its world premiere at the 72nd Berlin International Film Festival (Berlinale) on 11 February 2022. It was released theatrically in Italy on 24 February 2022 by Vision Distribution. The film had its French premiere at the Hallucinations Collectives festival in Lyon on 12 April 2022, and was released on the streaming service Canal+ on 6 April 2023.

The film opened in theaters in New York City and Los Angeles on 7 October 2022, and was released on the streaming service Shudder in North America, the United Kingdom, Ireland, Australia and New Zealand on 13 October.

== Reception ==
On the review aggregator website Rotten Tomatoes, the film holds an approval rating of 52% based on 54 reviews, with an average rating of 5.3/10. The website's critics consensus reads, "While it's far from Dario Argento's best, Dark Glasses may be worth a look for fans hungry for another horrific helping from a master of his craft."

Reviewing the film after its premiere at Berlinale, Anna Smith of Deadline Hollywood noted "an uncomfortable erotic gaze during attack scenes (if it is meant to be pastiche, it doesn't work)", and wrote that it "lacks the suspense and style of Argento's work in the 70s and 80s, while repeating various themes [...] most of it just reminds you how much better Argento was in the old days." Peter Bradshaw of The Guardian gave the film a score of two out of five stars, commending its opening sequence but calling it "bizarre in the wrong ways, with clunkingly absurd plot transitions", and writing that "the director is not particularly interested in the idea of Diana changing or growing as a person in the course of all this." The Daily Telegraph's Tim Robey also gave the film two out of five stars, lamenting Argento's perceived lack of "interest in learning new tricks" and criticizing the performance of the dog that plays Diana's guide dog.

Variety's Michael Nordine wrote that, "while only those blindly devoted to [Argento] will fail to see how patently ridiculous his latest offering is, only those immune to the puerile charm of attack dogs, eclipses and water snakes will fail to enjoy Dark Glasses even a little." Ben Croll of IndieWire gave the film a grade of "B+", calling it "a spiky little giallo that wants nothing more than to be labeled a return-to-form. If it falls ever-so-short, you've got to give it points for trying." Jordan Mintzer of The Hollywood Reporter concluded that, "Dark Glasses is never all that scary, and some of it is just plain silly, but if you take it at face value it can be enjoyable enough to sit through—more of a reminder of what Argento used to do best than an example in its own right."
