= Carolina Crescentini =

Italian actress (born 1980)

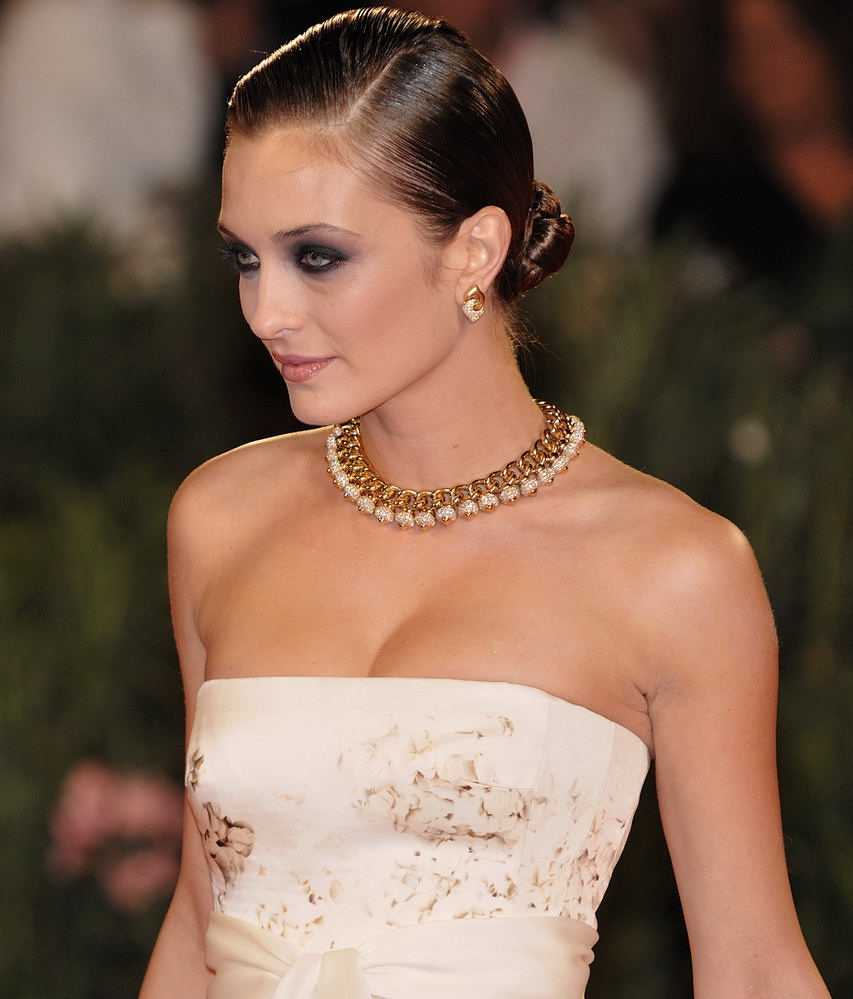
- Crescentini at the 2009 Venice Film Festival
- Born: 18 April 1980 (age 46); Rome, Italy
- Occupation: Actress
- Years active: 2005–present
- Spouse: Francesco Motta (m. 2019)

Carolina Crescentini (born 18 April 1980) is an Italian actress. She is a graduate of the Centro Sperimentale di Cinematografia, and star of the box office hit movie Parlami d'amore, directed by Silvio Muccino. She worked with Giuliano Montaldo on I demoni di San Pietroburgo and Fausto Brizzi on Notte prima degli esami – Oggi.

In 2008 Crescentini was the leading actress video made on the song "Non c'è contatto", played by Silvia Mezzanotte and written by Emilio Munda. Also in 2008 she was nominated to the David di Donatello for Best Supporting Actress thanks to her performance in Parlami d'amore.

Crescentini married singer-songwriter Francesco Motta in 2019.

== Filmography ==
=== Films ===
Year	Title	Role(s)	Notes
2006	Hate 2 O	Olivia's mother	Cameo appearance
2007	Notte prima degli esami – Oggi	Azzurra De Angelis	
2007	Concrete Romance	Asia	
2008	Parlami d'amore	Benedetta	
2008	The Demons of St. Petersberg	Anna	
2009	The Ladies Get Their Say	Sara	
2009	Generation 1000 Euros	Angelica	
2009	Oggi sposi	Giada	
2010	Loose Cannons	Young Nonna	
2010	20 Cigarettes	Claudia	
2010	Henry	Nina	
2011	Boris: The Film	Corinna Negri	
2011	L'industriale	Laura Ranieri	
2012	A Perfect Family	Sole	
2012	Breve storia di lunghi tradimenti	Cecilia Schwarz	
2013	Niente può fermarci	Ellen Reed	
2014	Fasten Your Seatbelts	Silvia	
2014	Fratelli unici	Giulia	
2015	Partly Cloudy with Sunny Spells	Paola	
2015	Wondrous Boccaccio	Isabetta	
2016	Solo	Ilaria	
2017	The End?	Voice of Lorena	
2017	Ignorance Is Bliss	Marianna	
2017	La verità, vi spiego, sull'amore	Sara	
2017	Diva!	Valentina Cortese	
2018	There's No Place Like Home	Ginevra	
2018	Sconnessi	Margherita	
2019	Sand and Fire	Lady Hester Stanhope	
2019	Letto numero 6	Bianca	
2021	Per tutta la vita	Giada	
2022	C'era una volta il crimine	Adele	
2023	Grosso guaio all'Esquilino – La leggenda del kung fu	Asia	
2023	Diabolik: Who Are You?	Gabriella Bauer	
2025	Love in Separate Beds	Herself	

=== Television ===
Year	Title	Role(s)	Notes
2005	Carabinieri – Sotto copertura	Carla Vichi	Television movie
2007	Provaci ancora prof!	Francesca	Episode: "Una mina vagante"
2007–2010, 2022	Boris	Corinna Negri	Main role (seasons 1, 4), guest star (seasons 2–3); 18 episodes
2010	Un cane per due	Emma	Television movie
2012	Mai per amore	Claudia	Episode: "Ragazze in web"
2014	Ti amo troppo per dirtelo	Stella	Television movie
2015	Max e Hélène	Hélène	Television movie
2016	Lampedusa – Dall'orizzionte in poi	Viola	Miniseries
2017–present	The Bastards of Pizzofalcone	Laura Piras	20 episodes
2020–2023	The Sea Beyond	Paola Vinci	Lead role (seasons 1–3); 33 episodes
2021	La bambina che non voleva cantare	Liliana	Television movie
2022	Everything Calls for Salvation	Giorgia	Episode: "Domenica"
2025	Mrs Playmen	Adelina Tattilo	Lead role

== Awards and nominations ==
Year	Award	Category	Work	Result	Ref.
2023	Ciak d'Oro Serie TV	Best Italian Actress	Boris; Everything Calls for Salvation; The Sea Beyond	Won	
