= First Light of Dawn =

- Directed by: Lucio Gaudino
- Written by: Lucio Gaudino
- Story by: Nicola Molino
- Produced by: Andrea De Liberato; Antonio Fusco
- Starring: Laura Morante; Gianmarco Tognazzi; Francesco Giuffrida
- Cinematography: Felice De Maria
- Music by: Andrea Guerra
- Release date: 2000
- Language: Italian

First Light of Dawn (Italian: Prime luci dell'alba [ˈpriːme ˈluːtʃi delˈlalba]) is a 2000 Italian drama film written and directed by Lucio Gaudino. It was entered into the main competition at the 50th Berlin International Film Festival. For their performances, Gianmarco Tognazzi e Francesco Giuffrida were both nominated for Nastro d'Argento for Best Actor.

== Cast ==
- Laura Morante as Anna
- Francesco Giuffrida as Saro
- Gianmarco Tognazzi as Edo
- Vittorio Ciorcalo as the doorman
- Ninni Bruschetta as Mirko Zappalà
- Francesca Chiarantonio as the doorman's daughter
- Roberto Nobile as Nino Procida

== See also ==
List of Italian films of 2000
