= Anna Foglietta =

Italian actress

- Foglietta in 2026
- Born: 3 April 1979 (age 47); Rome, Italy
- Occupation: Actress
- Years active: 2005–present
- Notable work: The American; Perfect Strangers
- Spouse: Paolo Sopranzetti (m. 2010)
- Children: 3

Anna Foglietta (born 3 April 1979) is an Italian actress. She has appeared in the films Escort in Love and Ex – Amici come prima!. She has also appeared in several television series such as Distretto di Polizia and The Mafia Kills Only in Summer.

== Biography ==
Foglietta was born and raised in Rome from a family of Neapolitan origins. She won the Nastro d'Argento for Best Actress, with If Life Gives You Lemons.

== Filmography ==
=== Films ===
Year	Title	Role(s)	Notes
2006	Sfiorarsi	Anna	
2006	4-2-2: Il gioco più bello del mondo	Chiara	Segment: "La donna del mister"
2008	Solo un padre	Caterina	
2008	Se chiudi gli occhi	Sara	
2009	I mostri oggi	Alessia	Segment: "La testa a posto"
2009	Feisbum - Il film	Sveva	
2010	The American	Anna	
2011	Escort in Love	Eva / Fabiana	
2011	Ex 2: Still Friends?	Sandra	
2012	Love Is Not Perfect	Elena	
2012	Lightning Strike	Adele Ventresca	
2013	Us in the U.S.	Carmen	
2013	L'oro di Scampia	Teresa Capuano	
2014	Blame Freud	Sara Tarramelli	
2014	St@lker	Ines	
2014	Happily Mixed Up	Silvia	
2015	The Legendary Giulia and Other Miracles	Elisa	
2015	God Willing	Pizza client	Cameo appearance
2015	My Daughter's First Time	Irene	
2016	Perfect Strangers	Carlotta	
2016	What's the Big Deal	Anna	
2017	Tainted Souls	Chiara	
2017	The Prize	Lucrezia Passamonte	
2017	Diva!	Valentina Cortese	
2018	If Life Gives You Lemons	Miriam	
2019	Parents in Progress	Simona Riva	
2020	Il talento del calabrone	Colonel Rosa Amedei	
2020	D.N.A.	Elena / Jessicah	
2021	Si vive una volta sola	Lucia Santilli	
2021	Trafficante di virus	Irene Colli	
2021	Blackout Love	Valeria	
2023	The Best Days	Stefania Felici	
2023	The Worst Days	Stefania Felici	
2023	Elf Me	Ivana	
2025	Storia di una notte	Elisabetta	
2026	A Common Story	Director, writer	

=== Television ===
Year	Title	Role(s)	Notes
2005–2007	La squadra	Agent Anna DeLuca	Main role (season 6-8)
2007–2009	Distretto di Polizia	Inspector Elena Argenti	Main role (season 8-9); guest (season 7)
2009	Il velo di Waltz	Christine	Television movie
2011	Rex	Sara	Episode: "La casa degli spiriti"
2012	Cesare Mori: Il prefetto di ferro	Angelina Mori	Docuseries
2015	Ragion di stato	Stella	Television movie
2016–2018	The Mafia Kills Only in Summer	Pia Melfi	Main role
2019	Storia di Nilde	Nilde Iotti	Docuseries
2021	Alfredino: Una storia italiana	Franca Bizzarri	Lead role
2023	Everybody Loves Diamonds	Anna	Main role
