= Love in Separate Beds =

2025 romantic comedy film directed by Massimiliano Bruno

- 2 cuori e 2 capanne
- Directed by: Massimiliano Bruno
- Written by: Massimiliano Bruno; Andrea Bassi; Damiano Bruè; Lisa Ricciardi
- Produced by: Fulvio Lucisano; Federica Lucisano
- Starring: Edoardo Leo; Claudia Pandolfi
- Cinematography: Marco Bassano
- Edited by: Luciana Pandolfelli
- Music by: Roberto Procaccini
- Production companies: Italian International Film; Vision Distribution
- Distributed by: Vision Distribution
- Release dates: 23 October 2025 (Rome); 22 January 2026 (Italy)
- Running time: 108 minutes
- Country: Italy
- Language: Italian

Love in Separate Beds (Italian: Due cuori e due capanne, stylized as 2 cuori e 2 capanne) is a 2025 Italian romantic comedy film directed by Massimiliano Bruno and starring Edoardo Leo and Claudia Pandolfi.

== Cast ==
- Edoardo Leo as Valerio
- Claudia Pandolfi as Alessandra
- Benedetta Tiberi as Lavinia
- Francesca Alati as Sestili
- Gianmarco Tognazzi as Sebastiano
- Giorgio Colangeli as Giacinto
- Marco Quaglia as Raimondo
- Federica Cifola as Prof. Borgonovo
- Alessia Barela as Barbara
- Francesca Figus as Flavia
- Giulia Mei as Giulia
- Jekesa as himself
- Aleph Viola as Simone
- Carolina Crescentini as herself
- Valerio Lundini as himself
- Daniele Silvestri as himself
- Betty Pedrazzi as Agnese
- Gabriele Rizzoli as Manzo
- Leonardo Pandolfi as Pasculli
- Francesco Leo as Tosetto
- Massimo Valentini as Buriani
- Nicola Cuneo as Cesare
- Sara Baccarini as Dr. Gallo
- Andrea Lolli as Tramezzani
- Claudia Tuccelli as Renata
- Marianna Menga as Franca

== Release ==
The film premiered at the 20th Rome Film Festival in the Alice nella Città section, where it won the Panorama Italia audience award. It was released theatrically in Italy on 22 January 2026, distributed by Vision Distribution.
