= They Call Me Jeeg =

- Italian theatrical poster
- Directed by: Gabriele Mainetti
- Written by: Nicola Guaglianone; Menotti
- Produced by: Gabriele Mainetti
- Starring: Claudio Santamaria; Luca Marinelli
- Cinematography: Michele D'Attanasio
- Edited by: Federico Conforti; Andrea Maguolo
- Music by: Michele Braga; Gabriele Mainetti
- Production companies: Goon Films, Rai Cinema
- Distributed by: Lucky Red (Italy); Uncork'd Entertainment (U.S.)
- Release date: 17 October 2015 (Rome Film Festival)
- Running time: 112 minutes
- Country: Italy
- Language: Italian / Romanesco dialect
- Budget: €1.7 million
- Box office: €6 million

They Call Me Jeeg (Italian: Lo chiamavano Jeeg Robot, transl. "They called him Jeeg Robot"; Japanese: 皆はこう呼んだ、「鋼鉄ジーグ」, romanized: Mina wa kō yonda, "Kōtetsu Jīgu", transl. "Everybody called [him] Steel Jeeg") is a 2015 Italian superhero film directed by Gabriele Mainetti and starring Claudio Santamaria in the lead role. The plot centers around a lonely misanthropic crook named Enzo, who gets superhuman strength after being exposed to radioactive waste in the Tiber waters.

The film is a tribute to the manga and anime series Steel Jeeg (Jeeg Robot d'acciaio in Italy, where it is very popular) by Gō Nagai, from which takes up some thematics; the title is an in-joke based on the character Alessia, who believes that the hero of the anime, Hiroshi Shiba, exists in the real world, and she mistakes Enzo for him. The title is also a reference to the spaghetti western film They Call Me Trinity (Lo chiamavano Trinità).

It received largely positive critical reviews and was nominated for several film industry awards, including seventeen David di Donatello, winning eight. The film was also one of seven films on a shortlist to be selected as the Italian entry for the Academy Award for Best Foreign Language Film at the 89th Academy Awards, but the film Fuocoammare was chosen instead.

After a successful run in Italian theaters in 2016, the movie got a limited release in the U.S. starting 17 March 2017 by Uncork'd Entertainment.

== Plot ==
Enzo Ceccotti is a thief who lives in the slum Tor Bella Monaca in Rome. After stealing a wristwatch, Enzo escapes two police officers by jumping into the Tiber. When Enzo tries to get out, he comes into contact with radioactive waste after he accidentally breaks a barrel under the river level. Spending a night feverish and vomiting, he wakes up healed but with a persistent cough. (Note: This is also a reference to common jokes made in Rome about the "blonde" Tiber being a particularly polluted river.)

Enzo decides to sell the watch to Sergio, who works for Fabio Cannizzaro, known as "The Gipsy", a psychopathic gangster who hungers for fame. Sergio takes him on a job which is supposed to involve extracting cocaine from inside a pair of drug mule brothers. At Sergio's home, Enzo meets his daughter Alessia, a psychologically damaged woman who escapes reality by continuously watching the Steel Jeeg anime and relating everything to it. After arriving with the drug smugglers at the top of a building under construction, one of them dies from an overdose when the container in his stomach breaks. Sergio refuses to take him to hospital, so the man's brother grabs Sergio's gun and shoots him. Sergio, before dying, bashes the man's head against a pillar. The man then shoots Enzo in the shoulder, knocking him backwards off the building; miraculously, Enzo survives.

At home, Enzo discovers he has acquired exceptional strength, the reason for his healing ability. That night, he steals an entire ATM and is filmed by a security camera; the surveillance video goes viral, and the press calls Enzo a super-criminal, although no one knows his true identity. Gipsy discovers that Sergio has not returned with the cocaine, which the gang bought from a camorra clan led by Nunzia Lo Cosimo, a terrorist. Gipsy must retrieve the cocaine or pay Nunzia off, so he and his gang invade Sergio's place, finding only Alessia. Enzo rescues her by crushing Gipsy's posse, and Alessia mistakes him for Hiroshi Shiba, the hero of Steel Jeeg.

Enzo, who wishes to live in solitude, takes Alessia to a residential care home, where she previously stayed while her father was imprisoned. Finding information hidden in Sergio's spectacle case, Enzo robs the valuable contents of the same armored truck that Gipsy and his gang are about to assault. This increases Enzo's infamy, making Gipsy jealous. Shortly thereafter, two police officers bring Alessia to Enzo after they find her wandering in the highway, and he takes her in. That night, as they watch a Steel Jeeg episode, Alessia experiences an emotional breakdown, revealing that she suffered sexual abuse.

Gipsy's gang crumbles as his gang questions his leadership, and Gipsy orders his rottweilers to maul a gangster who suggests taking a loan. However, with no other options, Gipsy contacts Brazilian transsexual loanshark Marcellone, only to be attacked by Nunzia and her gang; in the ensuing clash, only Gipsy and Nunzia survive.

Enzo initiates a sexual encounter, which Alessia passively submits to after asking him to slow down. During an argument immediately afterwards, Enzo reveals the truth about her father's death. Alessia flees in anger and boards a tram. Enzo stops it with his superhuman strength and apologizes, telling Alessia he cares about her and offering to go with her to see her father's body. The passengers film this, and Gipsy discovers Enzo's identity. He and his assistant, Tazzina, kidnap Alessia to force Enzo into revealing how he obtained his powers. Enzo takes him to the Tiber quay, where Nunzia attacks. Alessia is shot and asks Enzo to use his powers for good before she dies. Gipsy is shot multiple times, then burned alive by Nunzia with a flamethrower and apparently dies in the Tiber. The next day, he emerges from the river, scarred and burned but with superpowers like Enzo. He goes to Naples and films himself as he kills Nunzia and her gang.

While wandering alone, Enzo saves a woman and her daughter from a burning car. Enzo sees a video on television where Gipsy threatens to bomb the Stadio Olimpico. Enzo finds and confronts Gipsy but is unable to defuse the bomb. Enzo grabs it and jumps into the Tiber from the Musica-Armando Trovajoli bridge with Gipsy, who is killed in the explosion. Enzo, now thought dead and exalted as a hero, watches over Rome from the Colosseum and, determined to protect the city, puts on a Jeeg mask Alessia knitted for him.

== Cast ==
- Claudio Santamaria as Enzo Ceccotti / "Jeeg"
- Luca Marinelli as Fabio Cannizzaro / The Gipsy
- Ilenia Pastorelli as Alessia
- Stefano Ambrogi as Sergio
- Maurizio Tesei as Biondo
- Francesco Formichetti as Sperma
- Daniele Trombetti as Tazzina
- Antonia Truppo as Nunzia
- Gianluca Di Gennaro as Antonio
- Salvatore Esposito as Vincenzo

== Reception ==
=== Critical response ===
They Call Me Jeeg received positive reviews from critics, who praised Santamaria, Marinelli, and Pastorelli's performances, the screenplay, and the "township" setting. MoviePlayer gave the film 3.5 stars out of 5, calling it "a triumph of pure cinema, writing, acting, ability to stage and productive obstinacy". Film critic Massimo Bertarelli called it "a masterpiece, to watch at all costs [...] full of fun", praising Santamaria, Marinelli, and Pastorelli's performances. Jay Weissberg from Variety praised the film, calling it "surprisingly gritty and thoroughly enjoyable". After its U.S. release, the film received an 82% score on Rotten Tomatoes, based on 11 reviews, with an average rating of 6.8/10.

=== Awards and nominations ===
Year	Award/Festival	Category	Recipients	Result
2015	International Rome Film Festival	BNL People's Choice Award	Gabriele Mainetti	Nominated
2016	61st David di Donatello	Best New Director	Gabriele Mainetti	Won
2016	61st David di Donatello	Best Producer	Gabriele Mainetti	Won
2016	61st David di Donatello	Best Screenplay	Nicola Guaglianone, Menotti	Nominated
2016	61st David di Donatello	Best Actress	Ilenia Pastorelli	Won
2016	61st David di Donatello	Best Actor	Claudio Santamaria	Won
2016	61st David di Donatello	Best Supporting Actress	Antonia Truppo	Won
2016	61st David di Donatello	Best Supporting Actor	Luca Marinelli	Won
2016	61st David di Donatello	Best Cinematography	Michele D'Attanasio	Nominated
2016	61st David di Donatello	Best Score	Gabriele Mainetti, Michele Braga	Nominated
2016	61st David di Donatello	Best Production Design	Massimiliano Sturiale	Nominated
2016	61st David di Donatello	Best Costumes	Mary Montalto	Nominated
2016	61st David di Donatello	Best Make-up Artist	Giulio Pezza	Nominated
2016	61st David di Donatello	Best Hairstyling	Angela Vannella	Nominated
2016	61st David di Donatello	Best Editing	Andrea Maguolo	Won
2016	61st David di Donatello	Best Sound	Valentino Giannì	Nominated
2016	61st David di Donatello	Best Visual Effects	Chromatica	Nominated
2016	61st David di Donatello	Mercedes-Benz Future Award	Gabriele Mainetti	Won
2016	Bari International Film Festival	Ettore Scola Award for Best New Director	Gabriele Mainetti	Won
2016	Amsterdam Imagine Film Festival	Silver Scream Award	Gabriele Mainetti	Won
2016	Seattle International Film Festival	Best Film Award	Gabriele Mainetti	Nominated
2016	71st Nastri d'Argento	Best New Director	Gabriele Mainetti	Won
2016	71st Nastri d'Argento	Best Producer	Gabriele Mainetti, Goon Films and Rai Cinema	Nominated
2016	71st Nastri d'Argento	Best Actor	Claudio Santamaria	Nominated
2016	71st Nastri d'Argento	Best Supporting Actor	Luca Marinelli	Won
2016	71st Nastri d'Argento	Best Script	Nicola Guaglianone e Menotti	Nominated
2016	71st Nastri d'Argento	Best Cinematography	Michele D'Attanasio	Nominated
2016	71st Nastri d'Argento	Best Scenography	Massimiliano Sturiale	Nominated
2016	71st Nastri d'Argento	Best Costumes	Mary Montalto	Nominated
2016	71st Nastri d'Argento	Best Score	Gabriele Mainetti and Michele Braga	Nominated
2016	71st Nastri d'Argento	Hamilton behind the camera Award	Gabriele Mainetti	Won
2016	56th Italian Golden Globes	Best Film	Gabriele Mainetti	Won
2016	56th Italian Golden Globes	Best First Feature	Gabriele Mainetti	Nominated
2016	56th Italian Golden Globes	Best Actor	Claudio Santamaria	Nominated
2016	56th Italian Golden Globes	Best Actress	Ilenia Pastorelli	Nominated
2016	Italian Contemporary Film Festival	Toronto Film Critics Association's Award	Gabriele Mainetti	Won
2016	Giffoni Film Festival	Giffoni Experience Award	Claudio Santamaria	Won
2016	Ischia Global Film & Music Festival	Italian Worldwide Award	Gabriele Mainetti	Won
2016	73rd Venice International Film Festival	Starlight Award for Best Directorial Debut	Gabriele Mainetti	Won
2016	73rd Venice International Film Festival	Starlight Award for Best Actor	Claudio Santamaria	Won
2016	73rd Venice International Film Festival	Kinèo and RAI Com Award for Best Italian foreign release	Gabriele Mainetti	Won
2016	73rd Venice International Film Festival	Kinèo and Best Movie Award	Gabriele Mainetti	Won
2016	73rd Venice International Film Festival	Kinèo Award for Best Actor	Claudio Santamaria	Won

== Legacy ==
A comic book based on the film, produced by Lucky Red and La Gazzetta dello Sport, was published in 2016. The comic book is written by Roberto Recchioni, drawn by Giorgio Pontrelli and Stefano Simeone, and with the cover arts by Giacomo Bevilacqua, Leo Ortolani and Zerocalcare, and it takes place after the events of the movie.

== See also ==
- List of Italian films of 2015
