= 18 Years Later (2010 film) =

2010 Italian comedy-drama film

- Film poster
- Italian: Diciotto anni dopo
- Directed by: Edoardo Leo
- Written by: Marco Bonini; Edoardo Leo
- Starring: Edoardo Leo; Marco Bonini; Sabrina Impacciatore; Gabriele Ferzetti; Eugenia Costantini
- Cinematography: Piero Tirabassi
- Music by: Gianluca Misti
- Release date: June 4, 2010
- Running time: 100 minutes
- Country: Italy
- Language: Italian

18 Years Later (Italian: Diciotto anni dopo) is a 2010 Italian comedy-drama film written, directed and starring Edoardo Leo. For this film Leo was nominated for David di Donatello for Best New Director and for a Nastro d'Argento in the same category. The film also won several awards in a number of international film festivals, including the Audience Award at the Annecy Italian Film Festival and the awards for best film, best director, best actor and best actress at the 2010 Ibiza International Film Festival.

== Cast ==
- Edoardo Leo as Mirko
- Marco Bonini as Genziano
- Sabrina Impacciatore as Mirella
- Eugenia Costantini as Cate
- Gabriele Ferzetti as Enrico
- Vinicio Marchioni as Camilli, the lawyer
- Max Mazzotta as Portiere Hotel
- Luisa De Santis as Signora funerale
- Valerio Aprea as Impiegato del cimitero
- Carlotta Natoli as La logorroica
- Pasquale Anselmo as Funzionario del cimitero
- Antonio Fulfaro as Addolorato
- Tommaso Olivieri as Davide
- Giancarlo Magalli as himself

== See also ==
- List of Italian films of 2010
