= Happily Mixed Up =

2014 film

- Italian: Confusi e felici
- Directed by: Massimiliano Bruno
- Written by: Massimiliano Bruno; Edoardo Falcone
- Produced by: Fulvio Lucisano; Fedrica Lucisano
- Starring: Claudio Bisio; Marco Giallini; Anna Foglietta; Massimiliano Bruno; Paola Minaccioni; Caterina Guzzanti; Pietro Sermonti; Kelly Palacios
- Cinematography: Alessandro Pesci
- Edited by: Patrizio Marone
- Music by: Maurizio Filardo
- Distributed by: 01 Distribution
- Release date: 30 October 2014 (Italy)
- Running time: 102 minutes
- Country: Italy
- Language: Italian

Happily Mixed Up (Italian: Confusi e felici) is a 2014 Italian comedy film directed by Massimiliano Bruno.

== Cast ==
- Claudio Bisio as Marcello
- Marco Giallini as Nazareno
- Anna Foglietta as Silvia
- Massimiliano Bruno as Pasquale
- Paola Minaccioni as Vitaliana
- Caterina Guzzanti as Betta
- Pietro Sermonti as Enrico
- Kelly Palacios as Mercedes
- Rocco Papaleo as Michelangelo
- Gioele Dix as Andrea
- Raffaele Vannoli as Pallotta
- Helmut Hagen as Professor Breitner
