= Antonia Truppo =

Italian actress

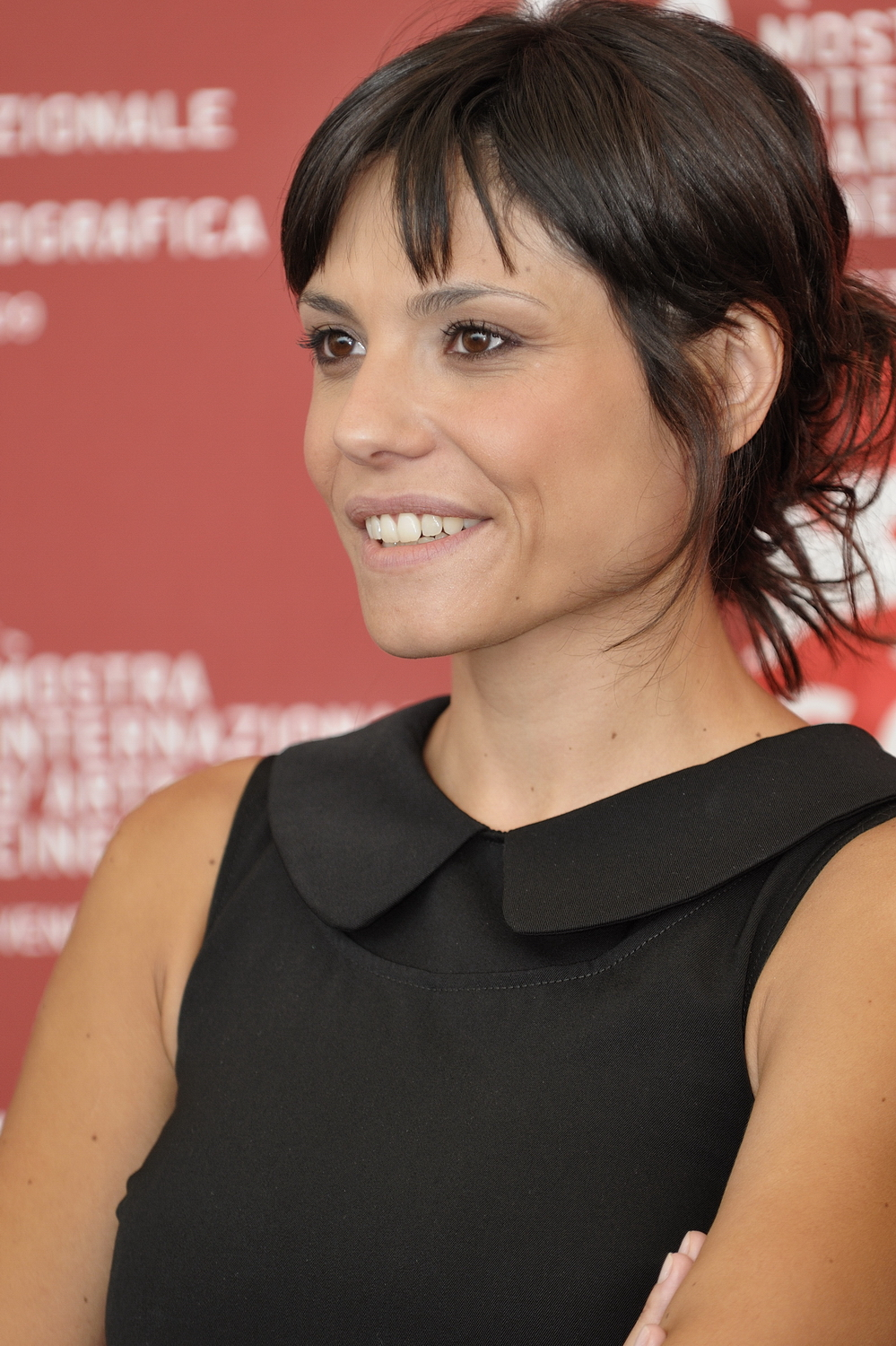
- Born: 14 February 1977 (age 49); Naples, Italy
- Occupation: Actress
- Years active: 2001–present
- Height: 1.61 m (5 ft 3 in)
- Awards: Best Supporting Actress (2016, 2017)

Antonia Truppo (born 14 February 1977) is an Italian actress. Truppo's television credits include Per amore del mio popolo, Inspector De Luca and Il segreto di Arianna. Her film credits include The Double Hour, Kryptonite!, They Call Me Jeeg and Indivisible.

Truppo was born in Naples.

In 2016, she won the David di Donatello for Best Supporting Actress for her performance in They Call Me Jeeg and in 2017 for Indivisible.

== Filmography ==
=== Film ===
Key
†	Denotes films that have not yet been released

Year	Title	Role(s)	Notes
2001	Red Moon	Orsola	
2001	The Three-Legged Fox	Teresa	
2003	I cinghiali di Portici	Monica	
2009	The White Space	Mina	
2009	The Double Hour	Margherita	
2011	Kryptonite!	Valeria	
2013	Meglio se stai zitta	Antonia	Short film
2014	L'amour ne pardonne pas	Lina	
2015	They Call Me Jeeg	Nunzia Lo Cosimo	
2015	Senza fiato	Anna	
2016	Indivisible	Titti	
2017	Omicidio all'italiana	Fabiola Normale	
2017	Couch Potatoes	Rosalba Bendidio	
2018	Stato di ebbrezza	Lidia	
2018	Se son rose	Fioretta	
2019	Copperman	Titti	
2019	Pop Black Posta	Alessia	
2020	Ultras	Terry	
2020	7 ore per farti innamorare	Lina CiùCiù	
2020	You Came Back	Gloria	
2021	Il mio corpo vi seppellirà	Maria	
2021	The King of Laughter	Adelina De Renzis	
2021	Benvenuti in casa Esposito	Patrizia Scognamiglio	
2023	Born for You	Nunzia	
2024	Sicilian Letters	Stefania	

=== Television ===
Year	Title	Role(s)	Notes
2005	La squadra	Inspector Paola Criscuolo	Recurring role
2007	Donne sbagliate	Rosa	Television film
2008	Inspector De Luca	Assuntina Manna	Episode: "Carta bianca"
2011	Napoli milionaria!	Assunta	Television film
2013	Il clan dei camorristi	Diego's mother	2 episodes
2014	Per amore del mio popolo	Angelina	Television film
2017	L'ispettore Coliandro	Vittoria Martello	Episode: "Il team"
2017	Sotto copertura	Lidia Franzese	Main role (season 2)
2018	The Generi	Luciana	Main role
2021	Inspector Montalbano	Maria Del Castello	Episode: "Il metodo Catallanotti"
2021	Crazy for Football	Paola	Television film
2022	Corpo libero	Rachele	Main role
