= Ilenia Pastorelli =

Italian actress (born 1985)

- Pastorelli in 2026
- Born: December 24, 1985 (age 40); Rome, Italy
- Occupations: Actress; Television presenter
- Years active: 2011–present
- Known for: They Call Me Jeeg
- Awards: David di Donatello for Best Actress (2016)

Ilenia Pastorelli (born 24 December 1985) is an Italian actress. In 2016, she made her film acting debut with They Call Me Jeeg, for which she was awarded the David di Donatello for Best Actress award.

== Biography ==
Pastorelli was born in Rome and studied there at Liceo Classico Platone. After a number of experiences working as a model, she reached notoriety in 2011 participating in Grande Fratello 12, where she was eliminated during the semi-finals.

Her cinema debut was in 2015 with Claudio Santamaria and Luca Marinelli in the film They Call Me Jeeg by Gabriele Mainetti, where she plays in the role of Alessia, a girl who suffered abuses. She was nominated to win the David di Donatello for Best Actress award in 2016, to then win the nomination.

In 2016 she appeared as the protagonist with Raoul Bova of the Biagio Antonacci's music videoclip - One day.

In 2016 she served as the anchor woman of TV program "Stracult".

In 2017 she appeared in the Laszlo Barbo film Niente di serio.

== Filmography ==
=== Film ===
Year	Title	Role(s)	Notes
2015	They Call Me Jeeg	Alessia	
2017	Niente di serio	Giuditta	
2018	Blessed Madness	Luna	
2018	Cosa fai a Capodanno?	Iole	
2019	All You Need Is Crime	Sabrina	
2019	Good Gals	Francesca Giovannelli	
2021	On Our Watch	Stella/Flora	
2021	Four to Dinner	Chiara	
2021	Angela and I	Angela	
2022	Dark Glasses	Diana	
2022	C'era una volta il crimine	Sabrina	
2023	Da grandi	Adult Serena	
2023	Lo sposo indeciso che non poteva o forse non voleva più uscire dal bagno	Samantha	

=== Television ===
Year	Title	Role(s)	Notes
2011–2012	Grande Fratello	Herself – Contestant	Reality show (season 12)
2017	MTV Awards 2017	Herself – Co-host	Annual ceremony
2020	Il cantante mascherato	Herself – Judge	Talent show (season 1)
2024	Adoration	Enza	Main role

=== Music videos ===
Year	Title	Artist(s)	Notes
2016	"La ballata di Huroshi"	Herself	
2016	"One Day (Tutto prende un senso)"	Biagio Antonacci	

== Awards ==
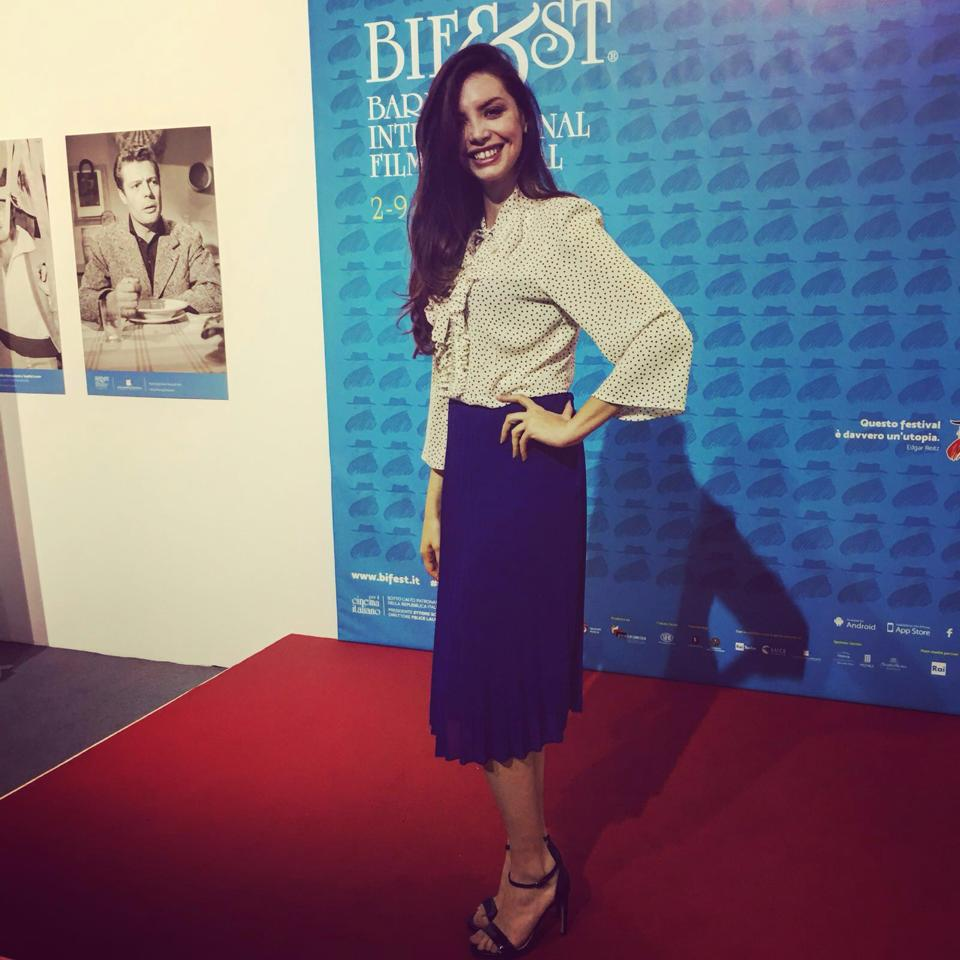
Ilenia Pastorelli in 2016.

- David di Donatello
  - 2016 – Best Actress for They Call Me Jeeg (2015) - Winner
- Festival delle Cerase
  - 2016 - Best actress revelation for They Call Me Jeeg (2015) - Winner
- La Pellicola d'Oro
  - 2016 – Best actress nomination for They Call Me Jeeg (2015) - Nomination
- Globo D'oro
  - 2016 - Best actress nomination for They Call Me Jeeg (2015) - Nomination
- Magna Graecia Film Festival
  - 2016 - Monica Scattini Awards for They Call Me Jeeg (2015) - Winner
- Giornate professionali di cinema
  - 2016 - ANEC Carlo Zanchi Award for They Call Me Jeeg (2015) - Winner
