= Escort in Love =

2011 film

- Film poster
- Original title: Nessuno mi può giudicare
- Directed by: Massimiliano Bruno
- Written by: Edoardo Maria Falcone; Massimiliano Bruno
- Produced by: Federica Lucisano
- Starring: Paola Cortellesi; Raoul Bova; Rocco Papaleo
- Cinematography: Roberto Forza
- Edited by: Luciana Pandolfelli
- Music by: Giuliano Taviani
- Distributed by: 01 Distribution
- Release date: 16 March 2011
- Running time: 95 minutes
- Country: Italy
- Language: Italian

Escort in Love (Italian: Nessuno mi può giudicare, "Nobody can judge me") is a 2011 Italian comedy film directed by Massimiliano Bruno. Paola Cortellesi won the 2011 David di Donatello for Best Actress for her performance as Alice.

== Plot ==
A wealthy woman, named Alice, lives in a luxurious house in Rome together with her husband and her 9-year-old son. She's superficial and materialistic, and treats her houseworkers very badly. Her world changes after her husband passes away in a motorbike accident, leaving Alice deeply in debt. She is forced to sell her house, and moves in the periphery with her son thanks to the advice of her old houseworker Aziz.

However, the money she got from the house still isn't enough to repay her debt; so she contacts an escort named Eva, whom she had previously met at a party, in order to learn how to be an escort and earn a lot of money quickly. She soon develops a relationship with a man named Giulio, owner of an internet point, and she has to keep her real job a secret.

== Cast ==
- Paola Cortellesi as Alice
- Raoul Bova as Giulio
- Rocco Papaleo as Lionello Frustace
- Anna Foglietta as Eva
- Awa Ly as Abeba
- Caterina Guzzanti as Sofia
- Dario Cassini as Pietro
- Fausto Leali as himself
- Giovanni Bruno as Filippo
- Hassani Shapi as Aziz
- Lucia Ocone as Tiziana
- Massimiliano Bruno as Francesco Graziani
- Lillo Petrolo as Enzo
- Raul Bolanos as Marcelo
- Riccardo Rossi as a journalist
- Valerio Aprea as Biagio
- Valerio Mastandrea as a client of Eva / narrator

== See also ==
- List of Italian films of 2011
