= Menotti (artist) =

Italian comic book artist and screenwriter (born 1965)

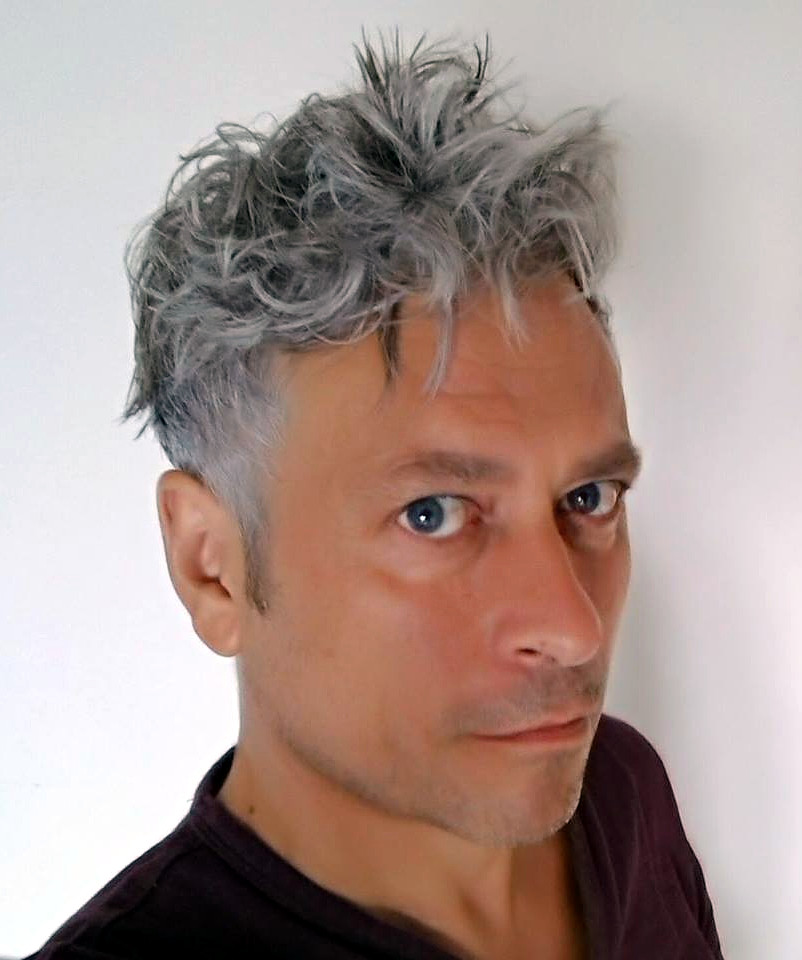
- Born: Roberto Marchionni; September 23, 1965 (age 61) Cortemaggiore, Italy
- Areas: artist, writer
- Pseudonym: Menotti
- Notable works: They Call Me Jeeg

Roberto Marchionni (September 23, 1965), known by his pen name Menotti, is an Italian comic book artist and screenwriter. He started his career in Bologna during the early 1980s and was published in Frigidaire, Cyborg, Comic Art and Blue. By the end of the 1990s he moved to Rome, where he worked as a screenwriter on several Italian TV series, such as Un posto al sole, Incantesimo, La squadra, 7 vite. He co-wrote They Call Me Jeeg, an Italian superhero film, nominated for best screenplay at the David di Donatello Award 2016.
