= Out of the Blue (2013 film) =

- Theatrical release poster
- Directed by: Edoardo Leo
- Written by: Edoardo Leo; Massimiliano Bruno
- Starring: Raoul Bova; Marco Giallini; Edoardo Leo; Nicole Grimaudo; Rosabell Laurenti Sellers
- Cinematography: Arnaldo Catinari
- Music by: Gianluca Misiti
- Distributed by: Medusa Film
- Release date: 5 March 2013
- Running time: 109 minutes
- Country: Italy
- Language: Italian

Out of the Blue (Italian: Buongiorno papà, lit. 'Good Morning Dad') is a 2013 Italian comedy film written and directed by Edoardo Leo, who also stars in the film. It was nominated for two David di Donatello awards, for best supporting actor (Marco Giallini) and best original song, and for two Nastri d'argento awards, for best comedy film and for best actor (the latter nomination was a tie between Raoul Bova and Marco Giallini).

== Plot ==
Andrea's life is going great: He shares an apartment with his best friend, Paolo, in Rome; he enjoys his never-ending string of one-night stands; and his career is skyrocketing. Everything changes, however, when one day the extravagant 17-year-old Layla shows up on his doorstep and claims to be his daughter. Andrea's life is suddenly thrown into upheaval as he must learn to take responsibility for his new family.

== Cast ==
- Raoul Bova as Andrea Manfredini
- Rosabell Laurenti Sellers as Layla Brighi
- Marco Giallini as Enzo Brighi
- Edoardo Leo as Paolo
- Nicole Grimaudo as Lorenza Metrano
- Paola Tiziana Cruciani as Adele Stramaccioni
- Giorgio Colangeli as Sgt. Colangeli
- Mattia Sbragia as Roberto Manfredini
- Ninni Bruschetta as Adriano

== See also ==
- List of Italian films of 2013
