= Alessandro Pesci =

Italian film cinematographer (born 1960)

- Born: 9 October 1960 (age 66); Rome, Italy
- Education: Gaumont School of Cinema
- Occupation: Cinematographer
- Years active: 1985–present
- Awards: Nastro d'Argento; 2011 We Have a Pope – Best Cinematography

Alessandro Pesci (born 9 October 1960) is an Italian film cinematographer.

Born in Rome, Pesci studied cinematography at the shortly lived local Gaumont School of Cinema, working in the industry since the 1980s. He won the Nastro d'Argento for Best Cinematography for Nanni Moretti's 2011 film We Have a Pope. He was nominated to David di Donatello for Best Cinematography in 2007 with Napoleon and Me, in 2008 with Quiet Chaos and in 2012 with We Have a Pope.

== Selected filmography ==
- Traces of an Amorous Life (1990)
- The Yes Man (1991)
- Un'altra vita (1992)
- The Bull (1994)
- The Second Time (1995)
- The Graduates (1995)
- Bits and Pieces (1996)
- Vesna Goes Fast (1996)
- Opening Day of Close-Up (1996)
- My Generation (1996)
- Auguri professore (1997)
- Notes of Love (1998)
- Kisses and Hugs (1999)
- The Anto War (1999)
- Holy Tongue (2000)
- Domenica (2001)
- On My Skin (2003)
- Napoleon and Me (2006)
- The Sweet and the Bitter (2007)
- Quiet Chaos (2008)
- From the Waist Up (2010)
- We Have a Pope (2011)
- Viva l'Italia (2012)
- Happily Mixed Up (2014)
- The Legendary Giulia and Other Miracles (2015)
- The Last Will Be the Last (2015)
- What's the Big Deal (2016)
- Se mi lasci non vale (2016)
