= All You Need Is Crime =

- Italian: Non ci resta che il crimine
- Directed by: Massimiliano Bruno
- Written by: Massimiliano Bruno
- Produced by: Fulvio Lucisano; Federica Lucisano; Rai Cinema
- Starring: Alessandro Gassmann; Marco Giallini; Edoardo Leo; Gianmarco Tognazzi; Ilenia Pastorelli
- Release date: 10 January 2019
- Country: Italy
- Language: Italian

All You Need Is Crime (Italian: Non ci resta che il crimine, lit. 'Nothing left to do but crime') is a 2019 Italian crime comedy film directed by Massimiliano Bruno.

The film had two sequels, Ritorno al crimine (2021) and C'era una volta il crimine (2022).

== Plot ==
Three friends in Rome in 2018 make ends meet creating a "criminal tour" for the places that were the theater of the deeds of the Banda della Magliana, complete with vintage clothes. Suddenly, however, they are catapulted in 1982, during the 1982 FIFA World Cup, being faced with the real criminal Banda della Magliana, which at the time ran clandestine betting on soccer.

== Cast ==
- Alessandro Gassmann as Sebastiano
- Marco Giallini as Moreno
- Edoardo Leo as Renatino
- Gianmarco Tognazzi as Giuseppe
- Ilenia Pastorelli as Sabrina
- Massimiliano Bruno as Gianfranco
- Antonello Fassari as Giuseppe's father in law
- Emanuel Bevilacqua as Bove

== Influences ==
The director Massimiliano Bruno stated he was influenced by Italian 1970–80s gangster movies and sexy comedies. The time travel plot was inspired by the 1984 comedy Nothing Left to Do But Cry, hence the Italian title Non ci resta che il crimine ("Nothing left to do but crime").

== See also ==
- List of time travel science fiction films
- Nothing Left to Do But Cry
