= Them Who? =

- Directed by: Francesco Miccichè; Fabio Bonifacci
- Written by: Fabio Bonifacci
- Starring: Marco Giallini; Edoardo Leo
- Cinematography: Arnaldo Catinari
- Music by: Gianluca Misiti
- Distributed by: Warner Bros. Pictures
- Release date: November 19, 2015
- Running time: 95 minutes
- Country: Italy
- Language: Italian

Them Who? (Italian: Loro chi? [ˈloːro ˈki]) is a 2015 comedy film written and directed by Francesco Miccichè and Fabio Bonifacci and starring Marco Giallini and Edoardo Leo.

== Plot ==
Davide ( Edoardo Leo ), is a 36-year-old suburban man with one single goal in life: to earn the esteem of the president of the company for which he works, get a raise, and be promoted to executive. He finally gets his chance when asked to present a revolutionary patent allowing him to land great recognition. Marcello ( Marco Giallini), is a con man, who has two lovely women partners. They deceive their victims into thinking he can make their dreams come true. The meeting between the two unsettles Davide's quiet life. The two become outlaw odd couple con-men. Hilarious situations with endless bickering. Who is conning who? Can a conned man con another con man or will they both get conned by the other con-man? A fun ride with handsome and innocent Davide falling into the con-man footsteps of rugged & experienced Marcello, or is he?

== Cast ==
- Edoardo Leo as David
- Marco Giallini as Marcello
- Catrinel Menghia as Ellen
- Lisa Bor as Mitra
- Ivano Marescotti as The President
- Vincenzo Paci as Melli
- Antonio Catania as Redattore
- Maurizio Casagrande as Maresciallo Gallinari
- Susy Laude as Cinzia
- Patrizia Loreti as David's Aunt
- Uccio De Santis as The Mayor

== See also ==
- List of Italian films of 2015
