= God Willing (2015 film) =

- Directed by: Edoardo Falcone
- Written by: Edoardo Falcone; Marco Martani
- Produced by: Lorenzo Mieli; Mario Gianani
- Starring: Marco Giallini; Alessandro Gassmann; Laura Morante; Ilaria Spada; Edoardo Pesce
- Cinematography: Tommaso Borgstrom
- Music by: Carlo Virzì
- Release date: 9 April 2015
- Running time: 87 minutes
- Country: Italy
- Language: Italian

God Willing (Italian: Se Dio vuole) is a 2015 Italian comedy film directed by Edoardo Falcone.

== Plot ==
Tommaso is a successful, respected cardiac surgeon who also happens to be an atheist. However, Tommaso's son Andrea, who is a medical student, announces in a family get-together that he wants to become a priest. Tommaso is petrified and irritated with Catholicism, plans with his son-in-law, Gianni, to prevent Andrea's change.

Tommaso goes undercover while Andrea is absent, on retreat in a monastery, to investigate and bring down the charismatic Father Don Pietro, who he believes has "brain-washed" his son and caused upheaval in his family. Meanwhile, his wife Carla, who feels unappreciated becomes an alcoholic and joins with a resistance movement reminiscing her active past and his daughter Bianca who lives in the opposite apartment gets interested and accepts Catholicism.

Fr. Pietro learns of Tommaso's plan and asks his help for one month as a handyman to renovate a church along with him to not reveal what Tommaso did to his son Andrea. Tommaso agrees and while working with Fr. Pietro, he starts to change his behaviors and become friendly with his co-workers and patients and a lot less uptight. Fr. Pietro takes him to a secluded serene hilltop with a view to a lake and explains everything that happens is God's will and plan. Tommaso's relationship with his wife gets better.

Tommaso's accidentally sees his son Andrea being intimate with a girl from their church group. Tommaso excuses himself, but his son comes and says the girl is his lover and intends to continue his medical studies. Tommaso asks about his priesthood decision and Andrea tells that after the retreat at the monastery he didn't feel he had what it required to really be a priest and tells Fr. Pietro knew about it. Tommaso feels fooled by the priest and equally funny.

Tommaso tries to reach Fr. Pietro through phone, but there is no answer. The next morning Tommaso finds Fr. Pietro in a stretcher in his hospital. He finds out Fr. Pietro met with an accident the day before and his condition is serious. He discusses the prognosis with his fellow doctor who was going to operate the priest and finds out the subdural hematoma is severe and would take a miracle to save him. Tommaso goes out to the church he and Fr. Pietro was renovating and does the remaining minor works and goes out to the serene place where the priest has taken him and sits there for sometime and sees a pear fall down and remembers how funnily Fr. Pietro explained to him that everything happens is God's will.

== Cast ==
- Marco Giallini as Tommaso
- Alessandro Gassmann as Father Pietro
- Laura Morante as Carla
- Ilaria Spada as Bianca
- Edoardo Pesce as Gianni
- Enrico Oetiker as Andrea
- Carlo De Ruggieri as Pizzuti
- Alex Cendron as Fratta
- Giuseppina Cervizzi as Rosa
