= Tezeta Abraham =

Italian-Ethiopian model and actress

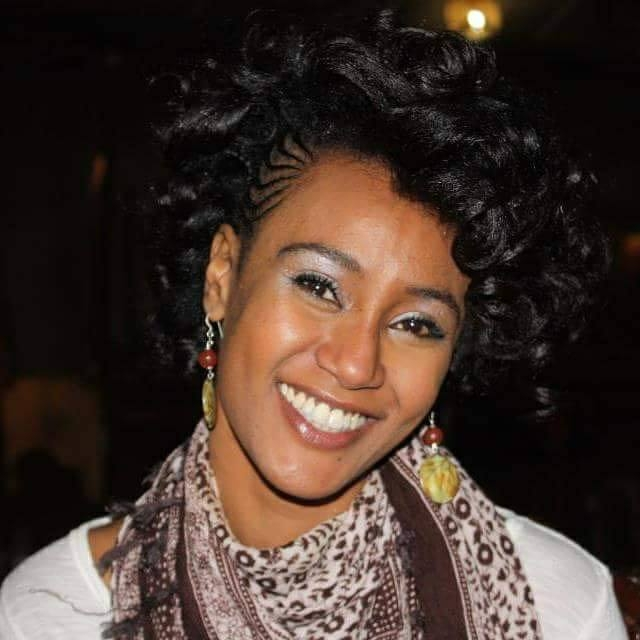
- Born: 15 February 1985 (age 41); Djibouti
- Occupations: Model, actress
- Height: 177 cm (5 ft 10 in)

Tezeta Abraham (born 15 February 1985) is an Italian-Ethiopian model and actress.

== Biography ==
Abraham was born in Djibouti to Ethiopian parents. She moved with her family to Italy at the age of five. Abraham struggled with her identity in her youth, often being the only black girl in her class at school. In 2002, she won the "Miss Italy Africa" contest which catapulted her into the fashion world. As a model, she worked for the brands Fendi, Gianfranco Ferre, Replay, Moschino, and Jean Paul Gaultier, among others. Abraham received her diploma as a tourist consultant. She participated in Miss Italy in 2010.

Abraham became interested in the cinema world and began participating in film auditions at age 18, often receiving marginal roles. She was told at the audition that she was too beautiful, which surprised her. In 2012, Abraham had a small role in the film A Flat for Three. One month after auditioning for director Ivan Cotroneo in 2015, Abraham received a role in the TV series È arrivata la felicità. Since 2015, she has worked with Cotroneo on several films and TV series. In 2017, Abraham played a university student interested in Lord Byron and Mary Shelley's life in Italy in the short film L'ultima rima. She played a mother in the 2018 short film La festa più bellissima. In 2019, Abraham helped launch the MiWorld Young Film Festival.

Abraham has a son. She is outspoken against racism in Italy, saying that black people living on the margins of society is a reflection of the Catholic culture. Abraham also promotes travel as a way of opening the mind to new cultures. She currently lives in Rome.

== Filmography ==
- 2012: A Flat for Three
- 2015-2018: È arrivata la felicità (TV series)
- 2017: L'ultima rima (short film)
- 2018: La festa più bellissima (short film)
- 2018: La pace all'improvviso (short film, director)
