= Solo (2016 film) =

2016 Italian comedy film

- Theatrical release poster
- Directed by: Laura Morante
- Written by: Daniele Costantini; Laura Morante
- Produced by: Luigi Musini; Olivia Musini; Renato Ragosta
- Starring: Laura Morante; Marco Giallini; Francesco Pannofino
- Cinematography: Fabio Zamarion
- Edited by: Claudio Di Mauro
- Music by: Nicola Piovani
- Production companies: Cinemaundici; Ela Film
- Distributed by: Warner Bros. Pictures
- Release date: 5 January 2016
- Running time: 97 minutes
- Country: Italy
- Language: Italian
- Box office: $1.8 million

Solo (Italian: Assolo) is a 2016 Italian comedy film directed by and starring Laura Morante.

== Cast ==
- Laura Morante as Flavia
- Marco Giallini as Mauro
- Francesco Pannofino as Gerardo
- Gigio Alberti as Willy
- Carolina Crescentini as Ilaria
- Emanuela Grimalda as Giusi
- Piera Degli Esposti as Dottoressa Grunewald
- Angela Finocchiaro as Valeria
- Eugenia Costantini as Giovanna
- Donatella Finocchiaro as Evelina
- Antonello Fassari as Istruttore di Scuola Guida
- Giovanni Anzaldo as Nicola
- Filippo Tirabassi as Stefano
- Edoardo Pesce as Istruttore di Scuola Guida
- Lambert Wilson as Michel
- Roberta Fiorentini as portinaia

== See also ==
- List of Italian films of 2016
