= The Last Will Be the Last =

- Directed by: Massimiliano Bruno
- Written by: Massimiliano Bruno; Paola Cortellesi; Gianni Corsi; Furio Andreotti
- Produced by: Fulvio Lucisano; Federica Lucisano
- Starring: Paola Cortellesi; Alessandro Gassmann; Fabrizio Bentivoglio
- Cinematography: Alessandro Pesci
- Music by: Maurizio Filardo
- Distributed by: 01 Distribution
- Release date: November 12, 2015 (Italy)
- Running time: 98 min
- Country: Italy
- Language: Italian
- Box office: $2.7 million

The Last Will Be the Last (Italian: Gli ultimi saranno ultimi [ʎ ˈultimi saˈranno ˈultimi]) is a 2015 drama film written and directed by Massimiliano Bruno and starring Paola Cortellesi and Alessandro Gassmann.

== Plot ==
In a city of Tuscia (Lazio), Luciana has a stable job in a weaving factory, and is in love with Stefano. Meanwhile, the shy policeman Antonio comes to the city, transferred from Verona after an unfortunate incident during his service. Luciana, because of her pregnancy, is fired from the factory, and she begins a very difficult period of financial straits. Antonio, meanwhile, suffers the harassment of his colleagues, and is absent-minded at work because of the remorse for the death of a friend of him during a military operation. Stefano, pressed by the difficult situation, has a relationship with a friend of Luciana. Luciana sinks ever deeper into despair, and decides to aim an attack at the office of the factory, against her former employer.

== Cast ==
- Paola Cortellesi as Luciana Colacci
- Alessandro Gassmann as Stefano
- Fabrizio Bentivoglio as Antonio Zanzotto
- Ilaria Spada as Simona
- Stefano Fresi as Bruno
- Giorgio Caputo as Enzo
- Irma Carolina Di Monte as Manuela

== See also ==
- List of Italian films of 2015
