= Massimiliano Bruno =

Italian director, screenwriter, playwright and actor

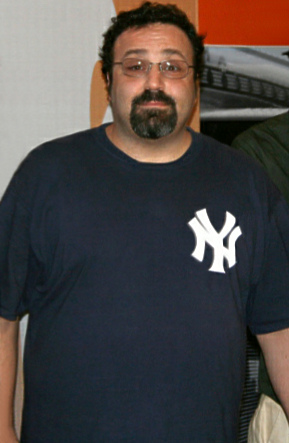
- Massimiliano Bruno in 2011
- Born: 4 June 1970 (age 56); Rome, Italy
- Occupations: Director; Screenwriter
- Height: 1.72 m (5 ft 8 in)

Massimiliano Bruno (born 4 June 1970) is an Italian director, screenwriter, playwright and actor.

== Life and career ==
Born in Rome into a family of Calabrian origins, Bruno formed as an actor in a drama laboratory "Torre Spaccata". He started his professional career in the Roman underground theatre, both as an actor and a playwright.

Bruno made his professional debut as a screenwriter in 2000, for the television film Non ho l'età. In 2006 he collaborated to the screenplay of the box office hit Notte prima degli esami. He made his directorial film debut in 2011 with Escort in Love, which won the Nastro d'Argento for Best Comedy Film. For this film he was also nominated for a David di Donatello for Best New Director and for a Nastro d'Argento in the same category.

== Selected filmography ==
- Notte prima degli esami (2006, writer)
- Notte prima degli esami – Oggi (2007, writer)
- This Night Is Still Ours (2008, actor and writer)
- Out of the Blue (2013, writer)
- Many Kisses Later (2009, writer)
- Questo mondo è per te (2011, actor)
- Boris: The Film (2011, actor)
- Escort in Love (2011, actor, director and writer)
- Viva l'Italia (2012, actor, director and writer)
- Happily Mixed Up (2014, actor, director and writer)
- The Last Will Be the Last (2015, director and writer)
- Ignorance Is Bliss (2017, director and writer)
- Just Believe (2018, actor)
- All You Need Is Crime (2019, actor, director and writer)
- Ritorno al crimine (2020, actor, director and writer)
- C'era una volta il crimine (2022, actor, director and writer)
- The Best Days (2023, actor, director and writer)
- The Worst Days (2023, actor, director and writer)
- Eravamo bambini (2023, writer)
- Love in Separate Beds (2025, actor, director and writer)
- Un tranquillo funerale di famiglia (2026, director and writer)
