= Crimini (TV series) =

- Genre: Anthology; Crime drama; Thriller
- Created by: Giancarlo De Cataldo
- Country of origin: Italy
- No. of seasons: 2
- No. of episodes: 16

Production
- Running time: 100 min

Original release
- Network: Rai Due
- Release: 6 December 2006 – 27 May 2010

Crimini is an Italian anthology crime-drama television series, created by Giancarlo De Cataldo. The first season premiered on 6 December 2006, concluding on 21 December 2007 on Rai 2.

== Episodes ==
=== Series overview ===
Series	Episodes	Originally released	
Series	Episodes	First released	Last released
1	8	6 December 2006	21 December 2007
2	8	9 April 2010	27 May 2010

== See also ==
- List of Italian television series
