= Gianmarco Tognazzi =

Italian actor (born 1967)

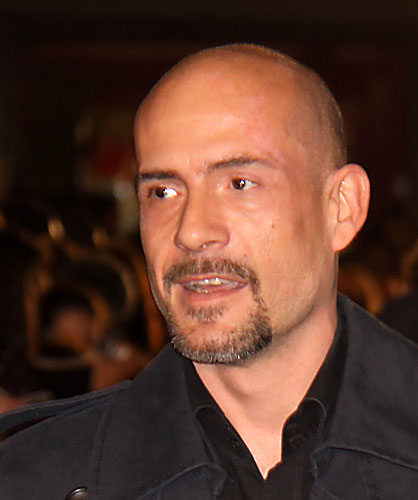
- Tognazzi in 2009
- Born: 11 October 1967 (age 59); Rome, Italy
- Occupation: Actor
- Parents: Ugo Tognazzi (father); Franca Bettoia (mother)
- Relatives: Maria Sole Tognazzi (sister); Ricky Tognazzi (half-brother); Thomas Robsahm (half-brother)

Gianmarco Tognazzi (born 11 October 1967) is an Italian actor.

== Life and career ==
Born on 11 October 1967 in Rome, the son of actors Ugo Tognazzi and Franca Bettoia, from his youth, Giammarco Tognazzi attended the film sets alongside his father. He debuted in a small role in Marco Ferreri's Don't Touch the White Woman! (1974). After working as an assistant director, he graduated at the Institute of State for cinematography and television "Roberto Rossellini" in Rome. In 1991 he won a Grolla d'oro for his performance in Emidio Greco's A Simple Story. He was also nominated to Nastro d'Argento twice, in 2000 as best actor for First Light of Dawn and in 2006 in the supporting actor category for Romanzo Criminale.

In the second half of the 1980s Tognazzi also worked as a television presenter, notably as host of the 1989 edition of the Sanremo Music Festival.

== Selected filmography ==
Year	Title	Role	Notes
1983	Petomaniac		
1984	Vacanze in America		
1987	Graveyard Disturbance		
1991	Ultra		
1991	Crack		
1991	A Simple Story		
1995	Once a Year, Every Year		
1995	The Graduates		
1996	Bits and Pieces		
1998	My Dearest Friends		
1999	Excellent Cadavers		
1999	S.O.S.	Angelo Minotti	
2000	First Light of Dawn		
2003	Past Perfect		
2005	Romanzo Criminale		
2008	The Early Bird Catches the Worm		
2009	Many Kisses Later		
2009	Natale a Beverly Hills		
2012	Dormant Beauty		
2012	To Rome with Love		
2013	A Five Star Life		
2014	Blame Freud		
2014	Misunderstood		
2016	Poveri ma ricchi		
2019	All You Need Is Crime	Giuseppe	
2019	Se mi vuoi bene		
2019	Sono solo fantasmi	Ugo	
2020	Divorzio a Las Vegas	Giannandrea	
2025	Love in Separate Beds	Sebastiano	
