= List of My Brilliant Friend characters =

My Brilliant Friend (Italian: L'amica geniale) is a Neapolitan- and Italian-language coming-of-age drama television series created by Saverio Costanzo for HBO, RAI, and TIMvision. Named after the first of four novels in the Neapolitan Novels series by Elena Ferrante, the series is an adaptation of the entire literary work into four seasons. My Brilliant Friend is a co-production between Italian production companies Wildside, Fandango, The Apartment Pictures, Mowe and international film groups Umedia and Fremantle.

The following is a list of cast members and respective characters who appeared on the television series My Brilliant Friend. The majority of the cast has changed multiple times across the series to better portray the characters as they age.

== Cast and characters ==
=== Overview ===
Character		Actor	Season			
Character		Actor	1	2	3	4
Main characters
Elena "Lenù" Greco	Infant	Ingrid Del Genio	Guest			
Elena "Lenù" Greco	Child	Elisa Del Genio	Main	Guest		
Elena "Lenù" Greco	Teen	Margherita Mazzucco	Main	Main	Main	
Elena "Lenù" Greco	Adult	Alba Rohrwacher	Narration	Narration	Guest	Main
Elena "Lenù" Greco	Elder	Elisabetta De Palo	Guest			Featured (Note: Dubbed by Alba Rohrwacher)
Raffaella "Lila" Cerullo	Child	Ludovica Nasti	Main	Guest		
Raffaella "Lila" Cerullo	Teen	Gaia Girace	Main	Main	Main	Featured
Raffaella "Lila" Cerullo	Adult	Irene Maiorino				Main
Immacolata Greco		Anna Rita Vitolo	Main	Main	Main	Main
Vittorio Greco		Luca Gallone	Main	Main	Main	Main
Manuela Solara		Imma Villa	Main	Main	Main	
Silvio Solara		Antonio Milo	Main	Recurring		
Nunzia Cerullo		Valentina Acca	Main	Main		Main
Fernando Cerullo		Antonio Buonanno	Main	Main	Featured	Recurring
Miss Oliviero		Dora Romano	Main	Main		
Michele Solara	Teen	Alessio Gallo	Main	Main	Main	
Michele Solara	Adult	Edoardo Pesce				Main
Stefano Carracci	Child	Kristijan Di Giacomo	Recurring			
Stefano Carracci	Teen	Giovanni Amura	Recurring	Main	Main	
Stefano Carracci	Adult	Giorgio Pinto				Recurring
Rino Cerullo	Child	Tommaso Rusciano	Recurring			
Rino Cerullo	Teen	Gennaro De Stefano	Recurring	Main		
Rino Cerullo	Adult	Salvatore Striano				Main
Giovanni "Nino" Sarratore	Child	Alessandro Nardi	Guest			
Giovanni "Nino" Sarratore	Teen	Francesco Serpico	Recurring	Main	Main	
Giovanni "Nino" Sarratore	Adult	Fabrizio Gifuni				Main
Pinuccia Carracci	Child	Giuliana Tramontano	Recurring			
Pinuccia Carracci	Teen	Federica Sollazzo	Recurring	Main		
Pinuccia Carracci	Adult	Giovanna Cappuccio				Recurring
Professor Galiani	Young	Anna Redi	Recurring			
Professor Galiani	Adult	Clotilde Sabatino		Main	Main	
Ada Cappuccio	Child	Lucia Manfuso	Recurring			
Ada Cappuccio	Teen	Ulrike Migliaresi	Recurring	Main		
Ada Cappuccio	Adult	Fabiana Fazio				Recurring
Antonio Cappuccio	Child	Domenico Cuomo	Recurring			
Antonio Cappuccio	Teen	Christian Giroso	Recurring	Main		
Antonio Cappuccio	Adult	Massimiliano Rossi				Recurring
Pasquale Peluso	Child	Francesco Catena	Recurring			
Pasquale Peluso	Teen	Eduardo Scarpetta	Recurring	Main	Main	Featured
Enzo Scanno	Child	Vincenzo Vaccaro	Recurring			
Enzo Scanno	Teen	Giovanni Buselli	Recurring	Main	Main	
Enzo Scanno	Adult	Pio Stellaccio				Main
Bruno Soccavo		Francesco Russo		Main	Main	
Franco Mari	Teen	Bruno Orlando		Main	Main	
Franco Mari	Adult	Stefano Dionisi				Main
Adele Airota		Daria Deflorian		Featured	Main	Main
Pietro Airota	Teen	Matteo Cecchi		Featured	Main	
Pietro Airota	Adult	Pier Giorgio Bellocchio				Main
Maria Rosa Airota	Teen	Giulia Mazzarino		Guest	Main	
Maria Rosa Airota	Adult	Sonia Bergamasco				Main
Guido Airota		Gabriele Vacis		Guest	Main	Recurring
Silvia	Teen	Maria Vittoria Dallasta			Main	
Silvia	Adult	Alice Piano				Recurring
Gino		Riccardo Palmieri	Recurring	Recurring	Main	
Nadia Galiani		Giorgia Gargano		Recurring	Main	Featured
Alfonso Carracci	Child	Valerio Laviano Saggese	Recurring			
Alfonso Carracci	Teen	Fabrizio Cottone	Recurring	Recurring	Featured	
Alfonso Carracci	Adult	Renato De Simone				Main
Gigliola Spagnuolo	Child	Alice D'Antonio	Recurring			
Gigliola Spagnuolo	Teen	Rosaria Langellotto	Recurring	Recurring	Main	
Gigliola Spagnuolo	Adult	Demi Licata				Recurring
Melina Cappuccio		Pina Di Gennaro	Recurring	Recurring	Featured	Recurring
Carmela "Carmen" Peluso	Child	Francesca Bellamoli	Recurring			
Carmela "Carmen" Peluso	Teen	Francesca Pezzella	Recurring	Recurring	Featured	
Carmela "Carmen" Peluso	Adult	Lucia D'Ambra				Recurring
Adele "Dede" Airota	Infant	Sofia Luchetti			Main	
Adele "Dede" Airota	Child	Vittoria Cozza				Main
Adele "Dede" Airota	Teen	Ludovica Rita Di Meglio				Main
Gennaro "Gennarino" Carracci	Infant	Daniel Campagna		Guest		
Gennaro "Gennarino" Carracci	Infant	Giuseppe Cortese		Guest	Recurring	
Gennaro "Gennarino" Carracci	Child	Salvatore Tortora			Main	
Gennaro "Gennarino" Carracci	Teen	Francesco Ferrante				Recurring
Gennaro "Gennarino" Carracci	Adult	Alessio Galati				Recurring
Marcello Solara	Child	Pietro Vuolo	Recurring			
Marcello Solara	Teen	Elvis Esposito	Recurring	Recurring	Main	
Marcello Solara	Adult	Lino Musella				Main
Elisa Greco	Infant	Sara Mauriello	Recurring			
Elisa Greco	Infant	Cristina Fraticola	Recurring	Recurring		
Elisa Greco	Child	Gaia Buongiovanni		Guest	Recurring	
Elisa Greco	Teen	Francesca Montuori			Featured	
Elisa Greco	Adult	Claudia Tranchese				Main
Eleonora Sarratore	Teen	Chiara Celotto			Main	
Eleonora Sarratore	Adult	Valeria Bello				Guest
Elsa Airota	Infant	Aria and Luce Milighetti			Guest	
Elsa Airota	Infant	Sophia Protino			Main	
Elsa Airota	Child	Fatima Credendino				Main
Elsa Airota	Child	Adriana Trotta				Main
Elsa Airota	Teen	Dominique Donnarumma				Guest
Featured characters
Don Achille Carracci		Antonio Pennarella	Featured			
Nella Incardo		Nunzia Schiano	Featured	Featured		
Armando Galiani		Giovanni Cannata		Featured	Featured	
Juan		Edu Rejón			Featured	
A Doctor		Giulia Pica			Featured	
Giuntini		Claudio Lardo			Featured	
Lila's Cardiologist		Mirko Setaro			Featured	
Lila's Neurologist		Vittorio Ciorcalo			Featured	
Mario's Friend		Giovanni Toscano			Featured	
Mario Gioia		Eugenio Di Fraia			Featured	
Clelia		Rebecca Fanucchi			Featured	
Maria Rosa's Boyfriend		Iacopo Ricciotti			Featured	

=== Main ===
The following actors are credited in the opening titles.

- Elisa Del Genio (season 1; guest season 2), Margherita Mazzucco (seasons 1–3), Alba Rohrwacher (season 4; cameo season 3), and Elisabetta De Palo (featured season 4; guest season 1) as Elena "Lenù" Greco, a girl from a poor neighbourhood in the outskirts of 1950s Naples. Rohrwacher also narrates the events of the series from the point of view of adult Elena Greco. The character is also portrayed by Ingrid Del Genio (guest season 1) as a very young child.
- Ludovica Nasti (season 1; guest season 2), Gaia Girace (seasons 1–3; special appearance season 4), and Irene Maiorino (season 4) as Raffaella "Lila" Cerullo, Elena's best friend and later, Stefano Carracci's wife
- Anna Rita Vitolo as Immacolata Greco, Elena's mother
- Luca Gallone as Vittorio Greco, a porter and Elena's father
- Imma Villa as Manuela Solara (seasons 1–3), Silvio Solara's wife, Michele and Marcello's mother
- Antonio Milo as Silvio Solara (season 1; recurring season 2), owner of the Bar Solara
- Valentina Acca as Nunzia Cerullo (seasons 1–2, 4), Lila's mother
- Antonio Buonanno as Fernando Cerullo (seasons 1–3; recurring season 4), a shoemaker and Lila's father
- Dora Romano as Miss Oliviero (seasons 1–2), Elena and Lila's elementary school teacher
- Alessio Gallo (seasons 1–3) and Edoardo Pesce (season 4) as Michele Solara, Silvio and Manuela's son. The character is also portrayed by Adriano Tammaro (recurring season 1) as a child.
- Nunzia Schiano as Nella Incardo (seasons 1–2), Miss Oliviero's cousin in Ischia
- Giovanni Amura (seasons 2–3; recurring season 1) as Stefano Carracci, Don Achille Carracci's son and, later, Lila's husband. The character is also portrayed by Kristijan Di Giacomo (recurring season 1) as a child and by Giorgio Pinto (recurring season 4) as an adult.
- Gennaro De Stefano (season 2; recurring season 1) and Salvatore Striano (season 4) as Rino Cerullo, Lila's older brother and, later, Pinuccia's husband. The character is also portrayed by Tommaso Rusciano (recurring season 1) as a child.
- Francesco Serpico (seasons 2–3; recurring season 1) and Fabrizio Gifuni (season 4) as Giovanni "Nino" Sarratore, Donato and Lidia's son. The character is also portrayed by Alessandro Nardi (guest season 1) as a child.
- Federica Sollazzo (season 2; recurring season 1) as Pinuccia Carracci, Don Achille's daughter and, later, Rino's wife. The character is also portrayed by Giuliana Tramontano (recurring season 1) as a child and by Giovanna Cappuccio (recurring season 4) as an adult.
- Clotilde Sabatino as Professor Galiani (seasons 2–3), Elena's high school teacher. The character is also portrayed by Anna Redi (recurring season 1) as a younger woman.
- Ulrike Migliaresi (season 2; recurring season 1) as Ada Cappuccio, Melina Cappuccio's daughter. The character is also portrayed by Lucia Manfuso (recurring season 1) as a child and by Fabiana Fazio (recurring season 4) as an adult.
- Christian Giroso (season 2; recurring season 1) as Antonio Cappuccio, Melina Cappuccio's son. The character is also portrayed by Domenico Cuomo (recurring season 1) as a child and by Massimiliano Rossi (recurring season 4) as an adult.
- Eduardo Scarpetta as Pasquale Peluso (seasons 2–3; recurring season 1, featured season 4), Alfredo and Giuseppina's son. The character is also portrayed by Francesco Catena (recurring season 1) as a child.
- Giovanni Buselli (seasons 2–3; recurring season 1) and Pio Stellaccio (season 4) as Enzo Scanno, Nicola and Assunta's son. The character is also portrayed by Vincenzo Vaccaro (recurring season 1) as a child.
- Giovanni Cannata as Armando Galiani (seasons 2–3), Professor Galiani's son
- Francesco Russo as Bruno Soccavo (seasons 2–3), Nino's friend
- Bruno Orlando (seasons 2–3) and Stefano Dionisi (season 4) as Franco Mari, Elena's first boyfriend in Pisa
- Daria Deflorian as Adele Airota (seasons 2–4), Pietro Airota's mother
- Matteo Cecchi (seasons 2–3) and Pier Giorgio Bellocchio (season 4) as Pietro Airota, Elena's second boyfriend in Pisa and later, husband
- Giulia Mazzarino (season 3; recurring season 2) and Sonia Bergamasco (season 4) as Maria Rosa Airota, Pietro's sister
- Gabriele Vacis as Guido Airota (season 3; recurring seasons 2, 4), Pietro's father
- Maria Vittoria Dallasta (season 3) as Silvia, a student and a young mother. The character is also portrayed by Alice Piano (recurring season 4) as an adult.
- Riccardo Palmieri as Gino (season 3; recurring seasons 1–2), Elena's classmate and first boyfriend
- Giorgia Gargano as Nadia Galiani (season 3; recurring season 2, featured season 4), Professor Galiani's daughter
- Fabrizio Cottone (season 3; recurring seasons 1–2) and Renato De Simone (season 4) as Alfonso Carracci, Don Achille's son. The character is also portrayed by Valerio Laviano Saggese (recurring season 1) as a child.
- Rosaria Langellotto (season 3; recurring seasons 1–2) as Gigliola Spagnuolo, Mr. Spagnuolo's daughter. The character is also portrayed by Alice D'Antonio (recurring season 1) as a child and by Demi Licata (recurring season 4) as an adult.
- Pina Di Gennaro as Melina Cappuccio (season 3; recurring seasons 1–2, 4), a crazy widow
- Francesca Pezzella (season 3; recurring seasons 1–2) as Carmela "Carmen" Peluso, Alfredo and Giuseppina's daughter. The character is also portrayed by Francesca Bellamoli (recurring season 1) as a child and by Lucia D'Ambra (recurring season 4) as an adult.
- Sofia Luchetti (season 3), Vittoria Cozza (season 4) and Ludovica Rita Di Meglio (season 4) as Adele "Dede" Airota, Elena and Pietro's daughter
- Salvatore Tortora (season 3) as Gennaro "Gennarino" Carracci, Lila's son. The character is also portrayed by Daniel Campagna (guest season 2), Giuseppe Cortese (recurring season 3; guest season 2) as a child and by Francesco Ferrante (recurring season 4) as a teenager and by Alessio Galati (recurring season 4) as a young adult.
- Elvis Esposito (season 3; recurring seasons 1–2) and Lino Musella (season 4) as Marcello Solara, Manuela and Silvio's son. The character is also portrayed by Pietro Vuolo (recurring season 1) as a child.
- Francesca Montuori (season 3) and Claudia Tranchese (season 4) as Elisa Greco, Elena's younger sister. The character is also portrayed by Sara Mauriello (recurring season 1), Cristina Fraticola (recurring seasons 1–2) and Gaia Buongiovanni (recurring season 3; guest season 2) as a child.
- Chiara Celotto (season 3) as Eleonora, Nino's wife. The character is also portrayed by Valeria Bello (guest season 4).
- Sophia Protino (season 3), Fatima Credendino (season 4) and Adriana Trotta (season 4) as Elsa Airota, Elena and Pietro's daughter. The character is also portrayed by Aria and Luce Milighetti (guests season 3) as a very young child and by Dominique Donnarumma (guest season 4) as a teenager.

==== Featured ====
The following actors are credited in the opening titles of a single episode of the series.

- Antonio Pennarella as Don Achille Carracci (season 1), the local mobster
- Edu Rejón as Juan (season 3), a student in Milan
- Giulia Pica as a doctor (season 3), who provides contraceptives in Naples
- Claudio Lardo as Giuntini (season 3), chief editor at l'Unità
- Mirko Setaro as Lila's cardiologist (season 3)
- Vittorio Ciorcalo as Lila's neurologist (season 3)
- Giovanni Toscano as Mario's friend (season 3), a student in Florence
- Eugenio Di Fraia as Mario Gioia (season 3), an engineer in Florence
- Rebecca Fanucchi as Clelia (season 3), Adele's baby sitter in Florence
- Iacopo Ricciotti as Maria Rosa's boyfriend (season 3)

=== Recurring ===
The following actors are credited in the end credits of at least two episodes within a single season of the series.

The Grecos

- Emanuele Nocerino (season 1), Matteo Castaldo (seasons 1–2), Daniele Cacciatore (season 3; guest season 2) and Lucio Provenza (season 4) as Peppe Greco, Elena's younger brother
- Thomas Noioso (season 1), Raffaele Nocerino (seasons 1–2), Davide De Lucia (season 3; guest season 2) and Claudio Cacciaglia (season 4) as Gianni Greco, Elena's younger brother

The Carraccis

- Sarah Falanga as Maria Carracci (seasons 1–2, 4; guest season 3), Don Achille's wife

The Pelusos

- Gennaro Canonico as Alfredo Peluso (season 1), a highly skilled carpenter
- Lia Zinno as Giuseppina Peluso (seasons 1–2), Alfredo's wife

The Sarratores

- Emanuele Valenti as Donato Sarratore (seasons 1–2; guest season 4), a train controller
- Fabrizia Sacchi as Lidia Sarratore (seasons 1–2; guest season 4), Donato's wife
- Cristina Magnotti (season 1), Miriam D'Angelo (seasons 1–2) and Emanuela Caruso (season 4) as Marisa Sarratore, Donato and Lidia's daughter
- Michele Di Costanzo (guest season 1), Catello Buonomo (season 2; guest season 1) and Renato Bisogni (guest season 4) as Pino Sarratore, Donato and Lidia's son
- Federica Guarino (guest season 1), Federica Barbuto (season 2; guest season 1) and Francesca Matrone (guest season 4) as Clelia Sarratore, Donato and Lidia's daughter
- Gioele Maddi (guest season 1), Mattia Iapigio (season 2; guest season 1) and Adriano Schisano (guest season 4) as Ciro Sarratore, Donato and Lidia's son
- Matthias Strepponi (guest season 3) and Aldo Boschetto (season 4) as Mirko Sarratore, Nino and Silvia's son
- Aurora Grimaldi (season 4), Tyara Cascone (guest season 4) and Gaia Cuomo (guest season 4) as Immacolata "Imma" Sarratore, Elena and Nino's daughter

The Scannos

- Ciro Pugliese as Nicola Scanno (season 1), a greengrocer
- Marina Cioppa as Assunta Scanno (season 1), Nicola's wife
- Maria Vittoria Miorin as Nunzia "Tina" Scanno (season 4), Lila and Enzo's daughter

The Spagnuolos

- Mimmo Ruggiero as Mr. Spagnuolo (season 1; guest season 2), pastry chef at Bar Solara
- Patrizia Di Martino as Rosa Spagnuolo (season 1; guest season 2), his wife

The Cerullos

- Francesco Saggiomo as Dino Cerullo (season 2), Rino and Pinuccia's son

Others

- Valentina Arena as Jolanda (season 1; guest seasons 2–3), a stationer
- Vittorio Viviani as Mr. Ferraro (season 1), the librarian and an elementary school teacher
- Sergio Basile as Professor Gerace (season 1), Elena's high school teacher
- Giuseppe Brunetti as Dario (season 2)
- Paolo Tarallo as Filippo (season 3)
- Adalgisa Manfrida as Doriana (season 4), Pietro's partner
- Bexzbec Gambini Flores as Tania (season 4)
- Luigi Credendino as Roberto (season 4), Carmen's husband
- Dalal Suleiman as Rossella (season 4), a gynecologist
- Marina Vitolo as Mina (season 4), Elena's neighbor

=== Guests ===
The following actors are credited in the end credits of a single episode within a single season of the series.

- Antonio Maglione as Alfonso (season 1), a friend of Vittorio Greco's
- Enrico D'Errico as Pier Paolo Pasolini (season 2)
- Giustiniano Alpi as Rolando Berti (season 2)
- Alessandro Bertoncini as Carlo Fortini (season 2)
- Ilaria Zanotti as Giulia Cristaldi (season 2)
- Maria Rosaria Bozzon as Titina (season 2), Gennaro's baby sitter
- Maurizio Tabani as Professor Tarratano (seasons 2–3), a critic
- Vincenzo Antonucci as Edo (season 3)
- Ianua Coeli Linhart as Isabella (season 3)
- Antonella Romano as Teresa (season 3)
- Riccardo Russo as Marco Galiani (season 3)
- Maria Raffaella Cortese as Maria Carracci (season 3), Stefano and Ada's daughter
- Giulia Weber as Marcella (season 3)
- Roberta Geremicca as Maria (season 3)
- Jordan Andres Ayala Robles (season 3) and Andrea Pollice (season 4) as Albertino Sarratore, Nino's son with Eleonora
- Riccardo Fara as Luciano (season 3)
- Daniela De Luca as Silvana (season 4), Elena's maid
- Massimo Rigo as Enrico (season 4), a publisher
- Maria Torres as Clara (season 4), Enrico's wife
- Chiara Mauro as Mirella (season 4)
- Francesca Solombrino as Anna (season 4), Elena's maid
- Filippo Beltrami as Moreno (season 4), a friend of Gennarino's
