= Benedetta Cimatti =

Italian actress (born 1989)

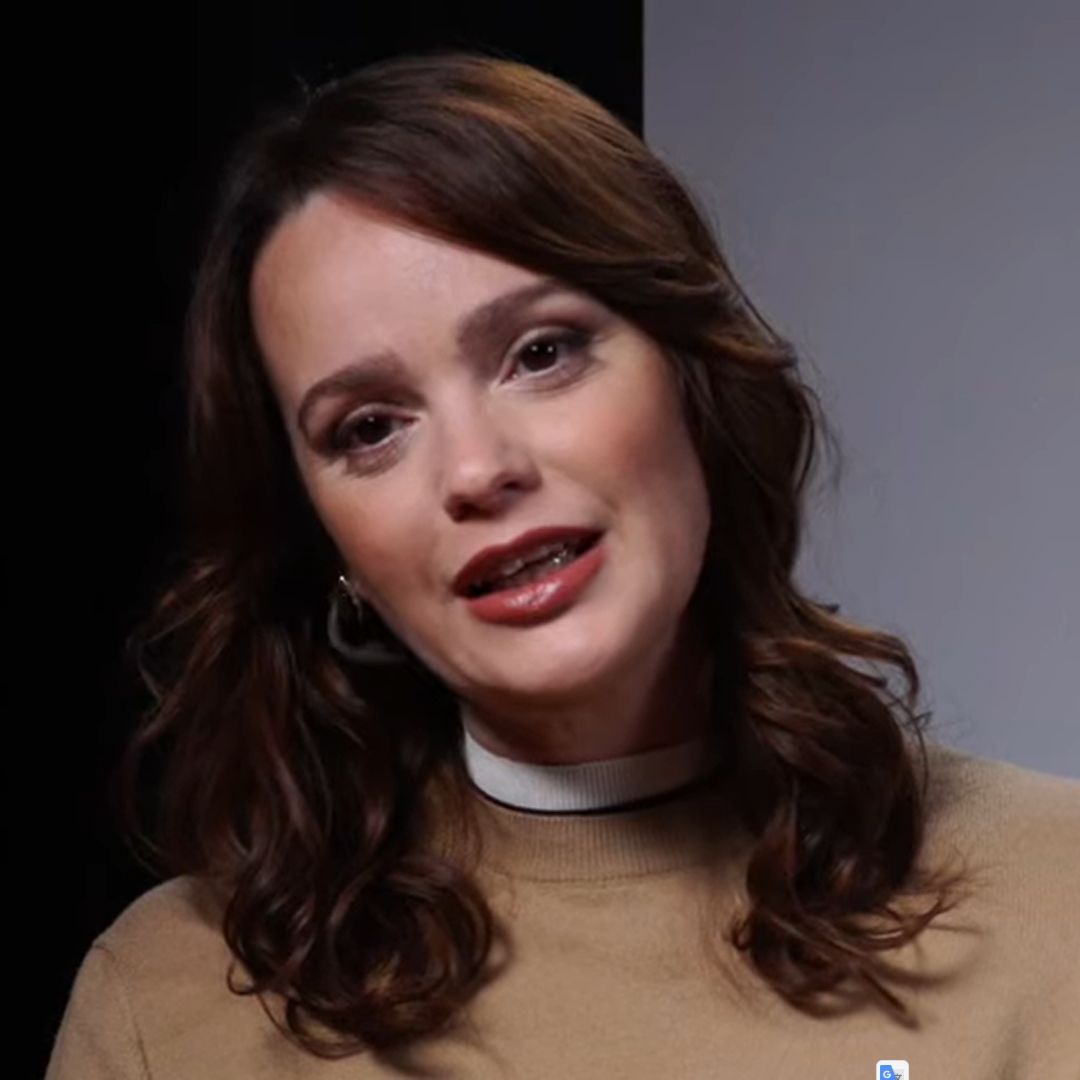
- Cimatti in 2025
- Born: 20 April 1989 (age 37); Faenza, Italy
- Occupation: Actress
- Years active: 2010–present

Benedetta Cimatti (born 20 April 1989) is an Italian actress. She is best known for her roles as Silvia in the zombie horror film The End? (2017) and Buffarini in the police procedural television series Inspector Coliandro (2016–2021). She played Rachele Mussolini in the biographical historical drama television series Mussolini: Son of the Century (2025).

== Biography ==
Cimatti was born in Faenza. After completing high school, she moved to Rome to pursue acting. She graduated from the Fondamenta drama school in 2011. In 2014, she made her film debut in the comedy film A Boss in the Living Room. She also made her television debut that year in the teen comedy series Fuoriclasse.

== Filmography ==
=== Film ===
Year	Title	Role	Notes	Ref.
2014	A Boss in the Living Room	Florence		
2017	The End?	Silvia		
2022	Feliz Navidad	Giulia	Short film	
2023	Tina Anselmi - Una vita per la democrazia	Francesca Meneghin		
2026	Il dio dell'amore	Linda		

=== Television ===
Year	Title	Role	Notes	Ref.
2014–2015	Fuoriclasse	Chiara	16 episodes	
2015	Inspector Rex	Eula	1 episode	
2017	Back Home	Milena	12 episodes	
2019	The Red Door	Erika Jamonte	2 episodes	
2020	Bella da morire	Rachele Cantini	8 episodes	
2020	Doc – Nelle tue mani	Chiara Marabini	5 episodes	
2016–2021	Inspector Coliandro	Buffarini	20 episodes	
2022	Circeo	Gioia	6 episodes	
2022	Cuori	Luisa Ferraris	2 episodes	
2025	Mussolini: Son of the Century	Rachele Mussolini	8 episodes	
2025	Giovannino Guareschi - Non muoio neanche se mi ammazzano	Ennia Guareschi	Television film	
