= The Sweet and the Bitter (2007 film) =

- Directed by: Andrea Porporati
- Starring: Luigi Lo Cascio; Donatella Finocchiaro; Tony Gambino; Gaetano Bruno; Vincenzo Amato; Renato Carpentieri
- Cinematography: Alessandro Pesci
- Music by: Ezio Bosso
- Distributed by: Medusa Film
- Release date: 4 September 2007 (Venice Film Festival)
- Country: Italy
- Language: Italian

The Sweet and the Bitter (Italian: Il dolce e l'amaro) is a 2007 Italian noir film directed by Andrea Porporati. It entered the competition at the 64th Venice International Film Festival.

== Cast ==
- Luigi Lo Cascio as Saro Scordia
- Gaetano Bruno as Mimmo Butera
- Toni Gambino as Gaetano Butera
- Fabrizio Gifuni as Stefano
- Donatella Finocchiaro as Ada
- Ornella Giusto as Antonia
- Renato Carpentieri as Vicari
- Luigi Lo Cascio as Saro's Father

== Plot ==
Saro is the son of a Sicilian criminal. He visits his father during a revolt in the prison where he is one of the leaders. At the end of the occupation his father dies, presumably under the fire of the police breaking in to suppress the revolt.
