= Empty Eyes =

Empty Eyes may refer to:

- Empty Eyes (1953 film)
- Empty Eyes (2001 film)
- Empty Eyes (CSI: Crime Scene Investigation episode)
- Empty Eyes, a 2013 album by To the Wind
