= Cimatti (surname) =

Cimatti is a surname. Notable people with the surname include:

- Benedetta Cimatti (born 1989), Italian actress
- Marco Cimatti (191?–1982), Italian cyclist
- Maria Raffaella Cimatti (1861–1945), Italian nurse
- Vincent Cimatti (1871–1965), Italian Roman Catholic priest
