= Back Home (TV series) =

Italian television series

- Italian: La strada di casa
- Genre: Drama; Mystery
- Created by: Francesco Arlanch; Andrea Valagussa
- Screenplay by: Francesco Arlanch; Andrea Valagussa; Maura Nuccetelli
- Directed by: Riccardo Donna
- Starring: Alessio Boni; Lucrezia Lante della Rovere; Sergio Rubini; Thomas Trabacchi; Paolo Graziosi; Christiane Filangeri; Eugenio Franceschini; Benedetta Cimatti; Sabrina Martina; Andrea Lobello; Silvia Mazzieri; Nicola Adobati; Gianluca Gobbi; Marco Cocci; Magdalena Grochowska; Mauro Serio
- Country of origin: Italy
- Original language: Italian
- No. of episodes: 24

Production
- Executive producers: Claudio Gaeta; Giulio Cestari
- Producer: Luca Barbareschi
- Running time: 50 minutes

Original release
- Network: RAI
- Release: November 14, 2017 – October 29, 2019

Back Home (Italian: La strada di casa) is an Italian mystery drama series directed by Riccardo Donna.

== Plot ==
Fausto Morra is a 50-year old family man, owner of a food-processing plant in Piedmont, Cascina Riva, consisting of hundreds of animals and acres of land. After a car accident, Fausto goes into a coma, waking up after 5 years. During that period, everything has changed: his wife Gloria married his best friend Michele and his plant is on the verge of bankruptcy. Slowly regaining his memories, Fausto realises that his past is vanishing, but he needs to discover the truth hiding behind his own affairs to get his life back. In particular, the disappearance of Paolo Ghilardi, a veterinarian who had accused Fausto of selling counterfeit meat, the night of his accident is shrouded in mystery. Once the case is solved, another mystery surrounds Fausto's family: his son Lorenzo's girlfriend Irene Ghilardi disappears the day before their marriage.

== Cast ==
- Alessio Boni as Fausto Morra, the founder of Cascina Morra, a charismatic man and authoritarian father
- Lucrezia Lante della Rovere as Gloria, Fausto's wife and mother of their four children
- Thomas Trabacchi as Michele, Fausto's best friend, an agronomist at Cascina Morra
- Sergio Rubini as Ernesto Baldoni, Paolo Ghilardi's boss, initially he accuses Fausto of Ghilardi's death, then he helps him to look for Irene Ghilardi, whom he considers as his own child
- Eugenio Franceschini as Lorenzo Morra, a dreamer and idealist, he finds his way opening a brewery
- Christiane Filangieri as Veronica Nardi, a beautiful woman in a relationship with Ernesto and with a passion for the catering industry

== Episodes ==
Season	Episodes	Originally released	
Season	Episodes	First released	Last released
1	12	November 14, 2017	December 14, 2017
2	12	September 17, 2019	October 29, 2019
