= Perez. =

- Directed by: Edoardo De Angelis
- Written by: Edoardo De Angelis; Filippo Gravino
- Starring: Luca Zingaretti; Marco D'Amore; Simona Tabasco; Gianpaolo Fabrizio; Massimiliano Gallo
- Cinematography: Ferran Paredes
- Release date: September 5, 2014 (Venice)
- Running time: 94 minutes
- Language: Italian

Perez. is a 2014 Italian neo-noir film written and directed by Edoardo De Angelis. It was screened in the Horizons section at the 71st Venice International Film Festival.

== Plot ==
Demetrio Perez is a famous criminal lawyer from Naples who years ago was considered one of the best in his field, but after having made too many enemies is now reduced to working as a public defender. His life begins to fall apart when his daughter Mia falls madly in love with Francesco Corvino, the son of a boss of the Camorra, who was the one who bribed Perez’s boss to demote him.

Luca Buglione, the boss of a rival clan, decides to become a pentito. He makes a deal with Perez: if the lawyer manages to retrieve a batch of smuggled diamonds for him, he will then testify against Francesco.

== Cast ==
- Luca Zingaretti as Demetrio Perez
- Marco D'Amore as Francesco Corvino
- Simona Tabasco as Tea Perez
- Massimiliano Gallo as Luca Buglione
- Giampaolo Fabrizio as Ignazio Merolla
- Toni Laudadio as PM Rossetti
- Antonio Pennarella as Assistente PM
- Cristina Donadio as Madre di Corvino
- Ivan Castiglione as Walter
- Lino Musella as Latella
- Salvatore Cantalupo as Uomo auto
- Gennaro Di Colandrea as Uomo in tribunale
- Giovanni Vastarella as Rapinatore
- Saman Anthony as Indiano

== See also ==
- List of Italian films of 2014
