= Donatella Finocchiaro =

Italian actress

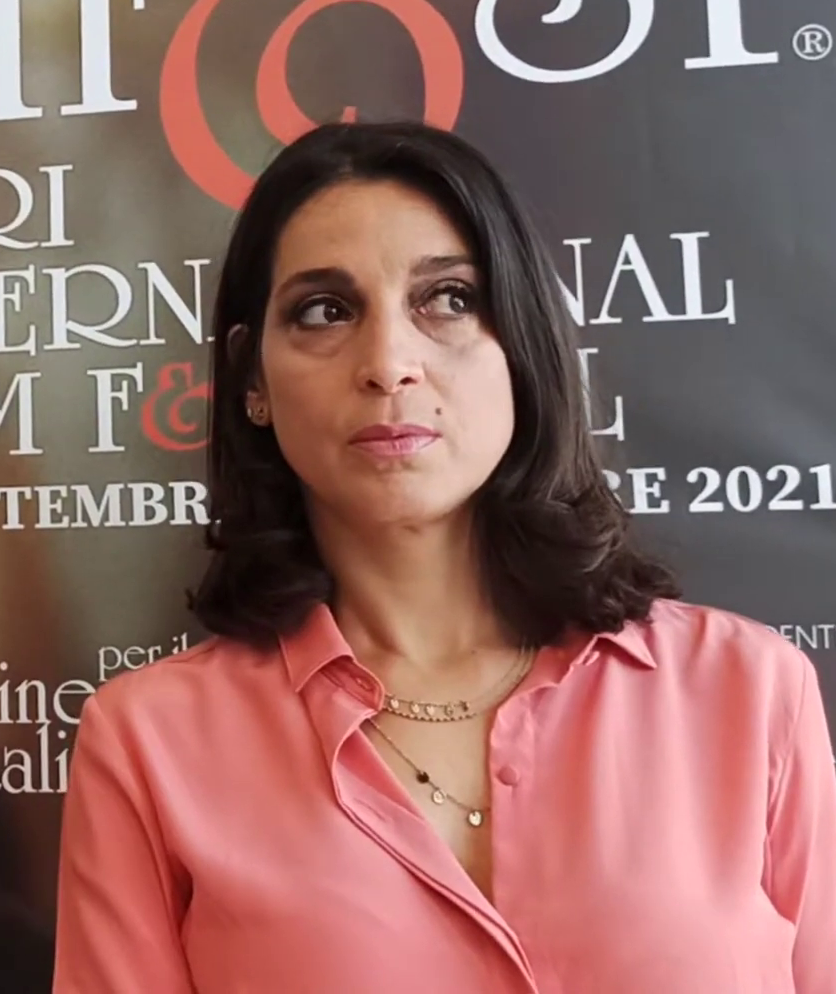
- Finocchiaro at the 2021 Bari International Film Festival
- Born: 16 November 1970 (age 55); Catania, Italy
- Occupation: Actress
- Years active: 2002–present

Donatella Finocchiaro (born 16 November 1970) is an Italian actress. She has appeared in more than 60 films since 2002. She starred in The Wedding Director, which was screened in the Un Certain Regard section at the 2006 Cannes Film Festival.

== Filmography ==
=== Film ===
Key
†	Denotes films that have not yet been released

Year	Title	Role(s)	Notes
2002	Angela	Angela	
2003	Lost Love	Mary	
2003	On My Skin	Bianca	
2004	Se devo essere sincera	Gina	
2005	Amatemi	Giulia	
2006	Secret Journey	Anna Olivieri	
2006	Sorelle	Sara	
2006	Don't Make Any Plans for Tonight	Paola	
2006	The Wedding Director	Bona di Gravina	
2006	Ice on Fire	Caterina	
2007	L'abbuffata	Enza	
2007	The Sweet and the Bitter	Ada	
2008	Amore che vieni, amore che vai	Veretta	
2008	The Brave Men	Lucia Rizzo	
2009	Baarìa	Haberdasher	Cameo appearance
2010	Sorelle mai	Sara	
2010	Lost Kisses	Rita	
2011	The Ages of Love	Eliana/Gaia	
2011	Make a Fake	Aurora	
2011	Terraferma	Giulietta	
2012	To Rome with Love	Journalist	Cameo appearance
2012	I Don't Know Yet	Giulia	
2012	Sulla strada di casa	Laura	
2013	Marina	Ida	
2014	War Story	Daria	
2014	Mio papà	Claudia	
2016	Solo	Evelina	
2017	Friends by Chance	Claudia	
2017	Nato a Casal di Principe	Teresa	
2017	Tulipani, Love, Honour and a Bicycle	Chiara	
2017	Couch Potatoes	President Barenghi	
2018	Youtopia	Laura	
2018	Beate	Armida	
2018	Capri-Revolution	Mother	
2019	La fuga	Giulia	
2019	Nonostante la nebbia	Valeria	
2020	Il delitto Mattarella	Irma Mattarella	
2020	The Macaluso Sisters	Adult Pinuccia	
2021	Caught by a Wave	Susanna	
2021	Upside Down	Veronica	
2021	Bentornato papà	Anna	
2022	Strangeness	Maria Antonietta	

=== Television ===
Year	Title	Role(s)	Notes
2008	Aldo Moro – Il presidente	Adriana Faranda	Two-parts television film
2008	Donne assassine	Marta	Episode: "Veronica"
2010	Crimini	Mariangela	Episode: "Niente di personale"
2011	Questi fantasmi	Maria Lojacono	Television film
2013	Il bambino cattivo	Flora	Television film
2014	Purché finisca bene	Marisa Collodi	Episode: "Una villa per due"
2018	Trust	Regina	3 episodes
2019	L'Aquila – Grandi speranze	Silvia Merli	Lead role
2020	Io, una giudice popolare al Maxiprocesso	Caterina Parisi	Television film
2022–2023	Monterossi	Lucia	Main role
2023	The Lions of Sicily	Giuseppina Saffiotti	Main role
2025	Public Disorder	Anna Fura	Main role; 6 episodes
