= Magnolia Award for Best Television Film or Miniseries =

Chinese television award

The Magnolia Award for Best Television Film (Chinese: 白玉兰奖最佳电视电影) is the one of main categories of the Shanghai Television Festival.

== Awards Winners & Nominations ==
Year	Golden Award	Silver Award	Other nominees
2013	(Germany) Hotel Adlon: A Family Saga		(Spain) We Shall Return (Iran) Even If It's the Night (Germany) Blueberry Blue (Italy) The Marathon Runner's Dream (United Kingdom) A Young Doctor's Notebook (Netherlands) Manslaughter (Russia) Life and Fate (Germany) Finn and the Road to Heaven (Czech Republic) Under the Surface (Austria) The Way You Are
2012	(Germany) Homevideo		(Spain) Angel of Budapest (Italy) The General of Brigandi (South Korea) Zenith (China) Camel Caravan (China) Crisis Management (France) Clara's Off to Die (Japan) Father of the Bride (Israel) Salsa Tel Aviv (Austria) The Kebab Incident (Spain) Barcelona: Neutral City
2011	(United Kingdom) Come Rain, Come Shine	(Germany) Delivering Hope	(Argentina) Belgrano (Netherlands) Chubby Drums (South Korea) Cutting off the Heart (Japan) The Goddess of the Toilet (Germany) Hindenburg (Italy) Queens of Swing (China) Secret Fragrance (Germany) The Spear of Destiny (Germany) The Struggle (Spain) Talking to the Wind (China) The Wonderful Life
2010	(Spain) The Voice of the Pamano	(Italy) Once Upon A Time in The City of Fools	(Germany) House and Child (United Kingdom) Emma (South Korea) Father's Home (Germany) Flight into the Night: The Tragedy of Überlingen (Taiwan) Wave Breaker (United States) Wizards of Waverly Place (Germany) Week by Week (Japan) The Shopping Trip (Italy) The Scandal of Roman Bank (Poland) The Magic Tree (China) Take Ex-Wife Home (Germany) Romy (United Kingdom) Mo
2009	(Germany) Welcome Home	(Japan) Ah, You're Really Gone Now	(Germany) Serrallonga (Italy) The Viceroys (China) Awakening (Italy) Puccini (Germany) The Visit (Australia) Scorched (United Kingdom) The 39 Steps (Denmark) The Light Ship (South Korea) My Bloody Lover (Spain) The King: The Hardest Day
2008	(Poland) Let's Go to the Movies Tomorrow	(United Kingdom) My Boy Jack	(Italy) Caravaggio (Germany) It's Your Life (China) Uncle Ma Gurley of Jeju Island (United Kingdom) Sense and Sensibility
2007	(Germany) March of Millions	(Italy) Giovanni Falcone, the Judge	(France) Lady Chatterley (United Kingdom) Born Equal (Russia) Franz + Polina
