= Historical drama =

Film subgenre

A historical drama (also period drama, period piece or just period) is a dramatic work set in the past, usually used in the context of film and television, which presents historical events and characters with varying degrees of fiction such as creative dialogue or scenes which compress separate events. The biographical film is a type of historical drama which generally focuses on a single individual or well-defined group. Historical dramas can include romances, adventure films, and swashbucklers.

Historical drama differs from historical fiction, which generally presents fictional characters and events during historical events. A period piece may be set during a vast era such as the Middle Ages, or a specific period such as the Roaring Twenties, or the recent past.

== Scholarship ==
In different eras different subgenres have risen to popularity, such as the westerns and sword and sandal films that dominated North American cinema in the 1950s. The costume drama is often separated as a genre of historical dramas. Early critics defined them as films focusing on romance and relationships in sumptuous surroundings, contrasting them with other historical dramas believed to have more serious themes. Other critics have defended costume dramas, and argued that they are disparaged because they are a genre directed towards women. Historical dramas have also been described as a conservative genre, glorifying an imagined past that never existed.

== Historical accuracy ==
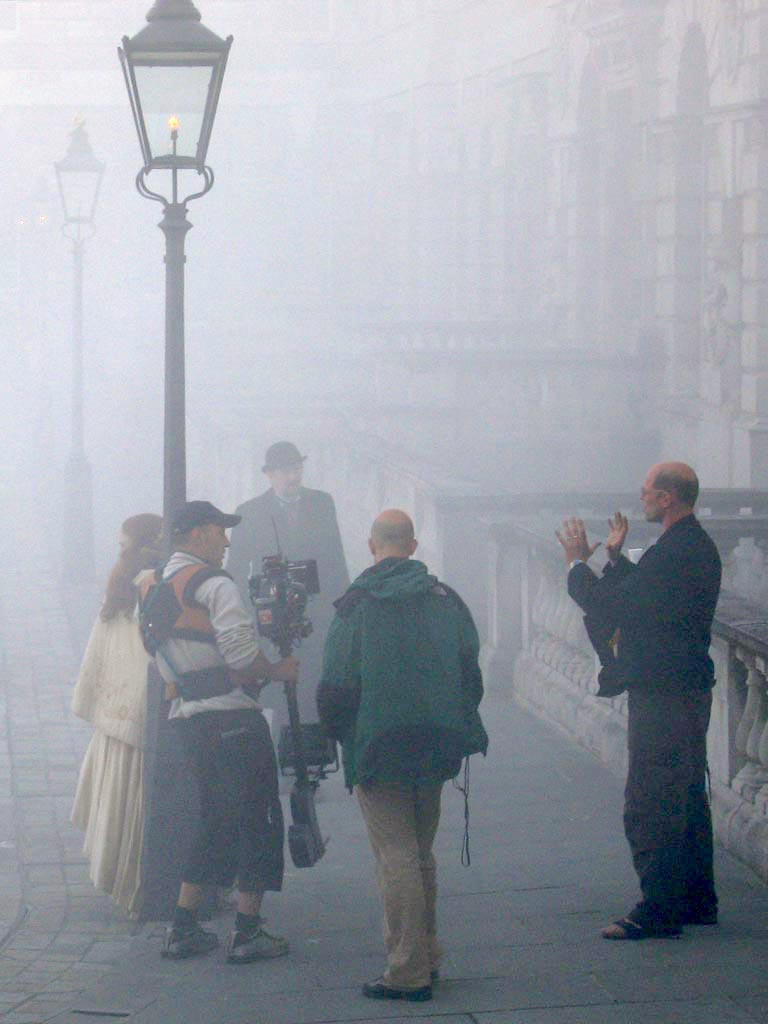
2004 filming of a 19th-century film scene set in London

Historical drama may include mostly fictionalized narratives based on actual people or historical events, such as the history plays of Shakespeare, Apollo 13, The Tudors, Braveheart, Pocahontas, Vinland Saga, Chernobyl, Enemy at the Gates, Les Misérables, and Titanic. Works may include references to real-life people or events from the relevant time period or contain factually accurate representations of the time period.

Works that focus on accurately portraying specific historical events or persons are instead known as docudrama, such as The Report. Where a person's life is central to the story, such a work is known as biographical drama, with notable examples being films such as Alexander, Excellent Cadavers, Frida, House of Saddam, Lincoln, Lust for Life, Raging Bull, Stalin, Oppenheimer and Portobello.

== See also ==
- Historical fiction
- Jidaigeki, Japanese historical dramas
- Sageuk, Korean historical dramas
- Queen's Latin
