= Liberato's Secret =

2024 Italian animated film

- Theatrical release poster
- Italian: Il segreto di Liberato
- Directed by: Francesco Lettieri; Giorgio Testi; Giuseppe Squillaci; LRNZ
- Written by: Francesco Lettieri
- Produced by: Ellida Bronzetti; Fabrizio Carratù; Ottavio Massimo Petroni; Alessio Russo; Andrea Iervolino
- Edited by: Mauro Rodella
- Music by: Liberato
- Animation by: Giuseppe Squillaci; LRNZ
- Production company: Red Private
- Distributed by: Be Water Film; Medusa Film
- Release date: 9 May 2024 (Italy)
- Running time: 94 minutes
- Country: Italy
- Languages: Italian; Neapolitan
- Box office: $1.2 million

Liberato's Secret (Italian: Il segreto di Liberato) is a 2024 Italian adult animated documentary film directed by Giorgio Testi, Francesco Lettieri, Giuseppe Squillaci and Lorenzo Ceccotti (a.k.a. LRNZ). The film tells the evolution of Italian singer Liberato, who also scores the soundtrack. The film was released in theaters in Italy on 9 May 2024.

== Plot ==
The film follows the singer's career, which started in 2017 with music that blends Neapolitan neo-melodic tradition, R&B and electronic music with some hip-hop influences.

== Voice cast ==
- Liberato as himself
- Simona Tabasco as Lucia
- Nando Paone as Grandpa

== Production ==
The film retraces the singer's concerts since his first appearances in 2017, to those in Berlin, Paris, London, at the Diego Armando Maradona stadium on the occasion of the victory of the third championship of SSC Napoli, the three dates in Piazza del Plebiscito in Naples, as well as the concert for the inmates of the Poggioreale prison. The animation, which tells the singer's biography, his early life, his youth, and his relationship with Lucia, was directed by Giuseppe Squillaci and LRNZ.

== Soundtrack ==
"Lucia (Stay With Me)"

Single by Liberato
- Released: 9 May 2024
- Genre: Electropop
- Length: 3:06
- Producer: Liberato

The film's soundtrack was scored by Liberato. On 9 May 2024, the electropop song Lucia (Stay With Me) which is part of the film's soundtrack, was released. The song was also produced by the singer.

== Promotion ==
The teaser trailer was released on the singer's social channels on 14 February 2024, while the first trailer was published in April 2024.

== Release ==
The film was released in theaters in Italy on 9 May 2024.

== Reception ==
=== Box office ===
The film earned $1.2 million worldwide. It earned 661 thousand euros on the opening weekend in Italy.

=== Critical response ===
Andrea Peduzzi of IGN stated, "On paper it was not at all easy to put together a film about such an elusive musician despite the involvement of Francesco Lettieri".

Lucia Tedesco of Wired stated, "[The film] is like his music, a stylistic pastiche applied to his vision, and he likes to play, to quote, to suggest that we are looking at something that does not want to be revealed."

Luigi Cocciulo of Mymovies gave 4 stars out of 5, stating, "A multi-media, multi-platform, multi-generational film about an artist who loves anonymity." Federico Gironi of Coming Soon gave 3,5 stars out of 5, stating, "There are many souls within this vital and restless film: above all the ability to reflect the soul and the idea of this mysterious masked musician, and of his city." Antonio Cumo of Movieplayer gave 3,5 stars out of 5, stating, "The animation created by the two artists is of high quality, capable of conveying the atmosphere sought with taste, capable, above all, of getting around the obstacle of not showing the young protagonist's face without appearing forced."
