= We Still Talk =

2021 Italian film

- Directed by: Pupi Avati
- Screenplay by: Pupi Avati; Antonio Avati
- Starring: Renato Pozzetto; Fabrizio Gifuni; Isabella Ragonese; Chiara Caselli; Lino Musella; Nicola Nocella; Gioele Dix; Serena Grandi; Alessandro Haber; Stefania Sandrelli
- Cinematography: Cesare Bastelli
- Edited by: Ivan Zuccon
- Music by: Lucio Gregoretti
- Release date: 2021
- Running time: 100 minutes
- Country: Italy
- Language: Italian

We Still Talk (Italian: Lei mi parla ancora) is a 2021 Italian romantic drama film co-written and directed by Pupi Avati and starring Renato Pozzetto and Stefania Sandrelli.

== Cast ==
- Renato Pozzetto as Giuseppe 'Nino' Sgarbi
- Stefania Sandrelli as Caterina 'Rina' Cavallini
- Lino Musella as Young Nino
- Isabella Ragonese as Young Rina
- Chiara Caselli as Elisabetta Sgarbi
- Matteo Carlomagno as Vittorio Sgarbi
- Fabrizio Gifuni as Amicangelo
- Nicola Nocella as Giulio
- Serena Grandi as Clementina
- Alessandro Haber as Bruno
- Giulia Elettra Gorietti as Marta
- Gioele Dix as the literary agent

== Production ==
The film is based on the autobiographical novel Lei mi parla ancora, written at 95 years old by Giuseppe Sgarbi, the father of the politician and art critic Vittorio and of the publisher and film maker Elisabetta.

It was produced by Bartlebyfilm and Vision Distribution in collaboration with Duea Film and was shot between the Ferrara Province and Rome.

== Release ==
The film was supposed to be released in cinemas in 2020, but because of the COVID-19 pandemic it was eventually acquired by Sky Italia and released on streaming starting from 8 February 2021.

== Reception ==
For his performance in this film Renato Pozzetto was awarded a special Nastro d'Argento and was nominated for the David di Donatello in the "Best Actor" category. The film also received Nastro d'Argento nominations for best film, best director and best supporting actor (Fabrizio Gifuni), and a David di Donatello nomination for best non-original screenplay.
