= Bentornato papà =

2021 film directed by Domenico Fortunato

- Directed by: Domenico Fortunato
- Screenplay by: Domenico Fortunato; Cesare Fragnelli; Francesca Schirru; Lorenzo Righi; Michele Santeramo
- Produced by: Cesare Fragnelli
- Starring: Donatella Finocchiaro; Domenico Fortunato; Riccardo Mandolini; Giuliana Simeone; Silvia Mazzieri; Giulio Beranek; Sara Putignano; Franco Ferrante; Giorgio Colangeli; Dino Abbrescia
- Cinematography: Giorgio Giannoccaro
- Edited by: Mauro Ruvolo
- Music by: Silvia Nair
- Production company: Rai Cinema
- Distributed by: Altre Storie
- Release date: 2021
- Running time: 93 minutes
- Country: Italy
- Language: Italian

Bentornato papà is a 2021 Italian drama film directed by Domenico Fortunato.

== Plot ==
After attending an important job interview in Rome, Franco comes back home with his son Andrea, who lives in the Capital trying to become a successful musician. In Puglia, where they live, his wife Anna and his daughter Alessandra wait for him. Sadly, just after getting the prestigious role he applied for, Franco has a stroke: such a tragic event disrupts Franco's and his family's lives, but it becomes a moment of personal growth at the same time.

== Cast ==
- Domenico Fortunato - Franco
- Donatella Finocchiaro - Anna
- Riccardo Mandolini - Andrea
- Giuliana Simeone - Alessandra
- Dino Abbrescia - Giovanni
- Giorgio Colangeli - uncle Silvano
- Giulio Beranek - Luca
- Silvia Mazzieri - Claudia

== Production ==
The movie was shot in Puglia (Martina Franca, Taranto, Porto Cesareo) and Rome.

== Release ==
A preview of the movie was presented on 29 September 2021 at the Bari International Film Festival in Bari. The movie was then released in cinemas on 7 October 2021 and televised for the first time on Rai 1 on 2 March 2022.
