= Oscar Mammì =

Italian politician (1926–2017)

Oscar Mammi
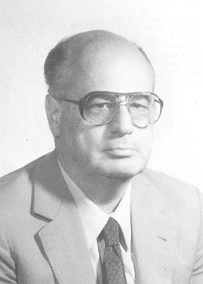

Minister of Mail and Telecommunications
- In office 28 July 1987 – 12 April 1991
- Prime Minister: Giulio Andreotti; Giovanni Goria; Ciriaco De Mita
- Preceded by: Antonio Gava
- Succeeded by: Carlo Vizzini

Minister for Parliamentary Relations
- In office 4 August 1983 – 17 April 1987
- Prime Minister: Bettino Craxi
- Preceded by: Lucio Abis
- Succeeded by: Gaetano Gifuni

Member of the Chamber of Deputies
- In office 6 June 1968 – 22 April 1992
- Constituency: Lazio

Personal details
- Born: 25 October 1926 Rome, Italy
- Died: 10 June 2017 (aged 90) Rome, Italy
- Party: Italian Republican Party

Oscar Mammì (25 October 1926 – 10 June 2017) was an Italian politician. A member of the Italian Republican Party (Partito Repubblicano Italiano; PRI), he was minister of Mail and Telecommunications from 1987 to 1991.

== Biography ==
Mammì was born in Rome and graduated in Economics and Trade. He was elected for PRI in the Italian Chamber of Deputies for the first time in 1972. After having been undersecretary of Industry and Trade, he was first Minister of Parliamentary Relations in the Craxi I and Craxi II Cabinets, and later Minister of Mail and Telecommunications in the Goria, De Mita and Andreotti VI Cabinets.

His name is connected with the so-called "Mammì Bill", issued in 1990, which was the first Italian comprehensive law dealing with media and TV and Radio advertisement. The law was accused of granting a substantial monopoly on public television to Silvio Berlusconi. The Italian Constitutional Court later in 1994 declared as anti-constitutional a comma of the law which allowed Berlusconi to own three TV networks; however, there was no measure to change the situation afterwards.

In 2005 he played in a TV fiction on Rai 3 Italian state channel.

Mammi died on 10 June 2017 at the age of 90.

== Sources ==
- Biography at Italian TV & Radio History website (in Italian)
