= A Boss in the Living Room =

- Theatrical release poster
- Un boss in salotto
- Directed by: Luca Miniero
- Written by: Luca Miniero; Federica pontremoli
- Produced by: Riccardo Tozzi
- Starring: Paola Cortellesi; Rocco Papaleo; Luca Argentero
- Cinematography: Federico Angelucci
- Edited by: Valentina Mariani
- Music by: Umberto Scipione
- Production company: Cattleya
- Distributed by: Warner Bros. Pictures
- Release date: 1 January 2014
- Running time: 90 minutes
- Country: Italy
- Language: Italian

A Boss in the Living Room (Italian: Un boss in salotto, also known as A Boss in the Kitchen) is a 2014 Italian comedy film directed and co-written by Luca Miniero.

It was a box-office hit, grossing over 12 million euros and being the best-grossing Italian film of 2014.

== Plot ==
Cristina is a woman from Naples who lives for years in Bolzano, with her husband Michele. Their love life is very quiet, but one day arrives Ciro, Cristina's brother: a boxwood mobster on the run from the law. The brother makes life very difficult for the Italian family as he dominates the house. Eventually the family likes the brother as he solves their problems with his criminal mind.

== Cast ==
- Paola Cortellesi as Cristina D'Avola / Carmela Cimmaruta
- Rocco Papaleo as Ciro Cimmaruta
- Luca Argentero as Michele Coso
- Angela Finocchiaro as Doriana Manetti
- Alessandro Besentini as Carlo Manetti
- Francesco Villa as the school principal
- Lavinia De' Cocci as Fortuna Coso
- Saul Nanni as Vittorio Coso
- Giselda Volodi as the neighbour
- Massimo De Lorenzo as the inspector
- Francesco De Fraia as a witness
- Raffaele Ferrante as a witness
- Domenico Manfredi as a witness
- Nunzia Schiano as Sister Giuseppa
- Salvatore Misticone as the English teacher
- Marco Marzocca as officer Santagata
- Carmen Giardina as the preliminary judge
- Marjo Berasategui as the adoptive mother
- Susanna Giaroli as Camille
- Benedetta Cimatti as Florence
- Cecilia D'Amico as Titina
- May Okoya as the nanny
- Nancy Gabriele as Janine
- Riccardo Cicogna as Mr. Peter
- Haruhiko Yamanouchi as the yoga teacher
- Maria Pia De Vito as the singer
- Luca Miniero as the judge
