= Winter (2002 film) =

- Directed by: Nina Di Majo
- Written by: Nina Di Majo
- Starring: Valeria Golino; Valeria Bruni Tedeschi; Fabrizio Gifuni; Yorgo Voyagis
- Cinematography: Cesare Accetta
- Edited by: Giogiò Franchini
- Music by: Frame
- Release date: 2002
- Language: Italian

Winter (Italian: L'inverno) is a 2002 Italian romantic drama film written and directed by Nina Di Majo.

== Cast ==
- Valeria Golino as Anna
- Valeria Bruni Tedeschi as Marta
- Fabrizio Gifuni as Leo
- Paolo Paoloni as Eddy
- Yorgo Voyagis as Gustavo
- Alberto Di Stasio as Sandro
- Romuald Andrzej Klos as Pit
- Paul Muller
