= Gaetano Gifuni =

Italian civil servant (1932–2018)

Gaetano Gifuni OMRI
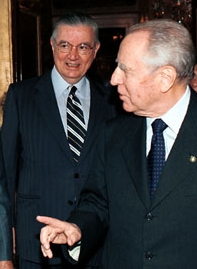
- Gifuni with President Carlo Azeglio Ciampi.

Secretary General of the President of the Italian Republic
- In office 28 May 1992 – 15 May 2006
- President: Oscar Luigi Scalfaro; Carlo Azeglio Ciampi
- Preceded by: Sergio Berlinguer
- Succeeded by: Donato Marra

Minister for Parliamentary Relations
- In office 18 April 1987 – 26 July 1987
- Prime Minister: Amintore Fanfani
- Preceded by: Oscar Mammì
- Succeeded by: Sergio Mattarella

Personal details
- Born: 25 June 1932 Lucera, Italy
- Died: 18 August 2018 (aged 86) Rome, Italy
- Party: Independent
- Education: Sapienza University of Rome

Gaetano Gifuni (25 June 1932 – 18 August 2018) was an Italian civil servant and politician who served as Secretary General of the President from 1992 to 2006 and as Minister for Relations with the Parliament in 1987.

He is the father of actor Fabrizio Gifuni and uncle of Luigi Tripodi, former head of the Quirinale Estate and Gardens Service.

== Biography ==
He graduated in law in 1955 and was hired by Confindustria.

On 1 January 1959, thanks to the passing of the relative competition, he entered the administration of the Senate of the Republic, of which he was appointed Secretary General on 26 June 1975.

In 1987 he served as Minister for Parliamentary Relations in the Fanfani VI Government (from 17 April to 27 July 1987).

Returning to the administrative top of the Senate of the Republic after the brief government break, he was appointed Secretary General of the Presidency of the Republic by Oscar Luigi Scalfaro on 28 May 1992.

He was confirmed in this latter office by the subsequent President Carlo Azeglio Ciampi in 1999. From 1992 to 2008 he was a member of the Council of State. In 2006, on the eve of the inauguration of the new President of the Republic Giorgio Napolitano, he gave up to continue running the Quirinale machine under the latter's mandate and therefore has been Secretary General emeritus ever since.

He died in Rome on 18 August 2018, at the age of 86.

== Judicial proceedings ==
In 2009 Gaetano Gifuni was investigated for forgery. According to the accusation, it would have been his signature that allowed his nephew Luigi Tripodi to have the assignment as service accommodation of an illegal house within the Castelporziano estate.

In April 2011 he was indicted for the management of the Castelporziano estate, relating to the squandering of the funds allocated by the Quirinale to the summer estate of the President of the Republic. The accusations were of abuse of office, false material and false ideology and embezzlement.

In April 2013 he was sentenced in first instance to one year and 5 months of imprisonment for abuse of office and embezzlement and acquitted of the other charges, however in the degree of appeal he was acquitted of all charges: from embezzlement "because the fact does not constitute a crime", while for the abuse of office the offense - connected to the embezzlement and from which it would therefore have been acquitted in any case - was declared extinct due to a prescription.

== Honours ==
- Italy : Knight Grand Cross of the Order of Merit of the Italian Republic (1975)
- Malta : Honorary Member of the Xirka Ġieħ ir-Repubblika (1995)
- Spain : Knight Grand Cross of the Order of Isabella the Catholic (1996)
- Malaysia : Honorary Grand Commander of the Order of Loyalty to the Crown of Malaysia (2003)
- Uruguay: Grand Officer of the Medal of the Oriental Republic of Uruguay (2003)
- Portugal : Knight Grand Cross of the Order of Prince Henry (2005)

Political offices
Preceded by Oscar Mammì	Minister for Parliamentary Relations; 1987	Succeeded by Sergio Mattarella
Government offices
Preceded by Sergio Berlinguer	Secretary General of the President of Italy; 1992–2006	Succeeded by Donato Marra
