= Elisa Wong =

Italian actress (born 1996)

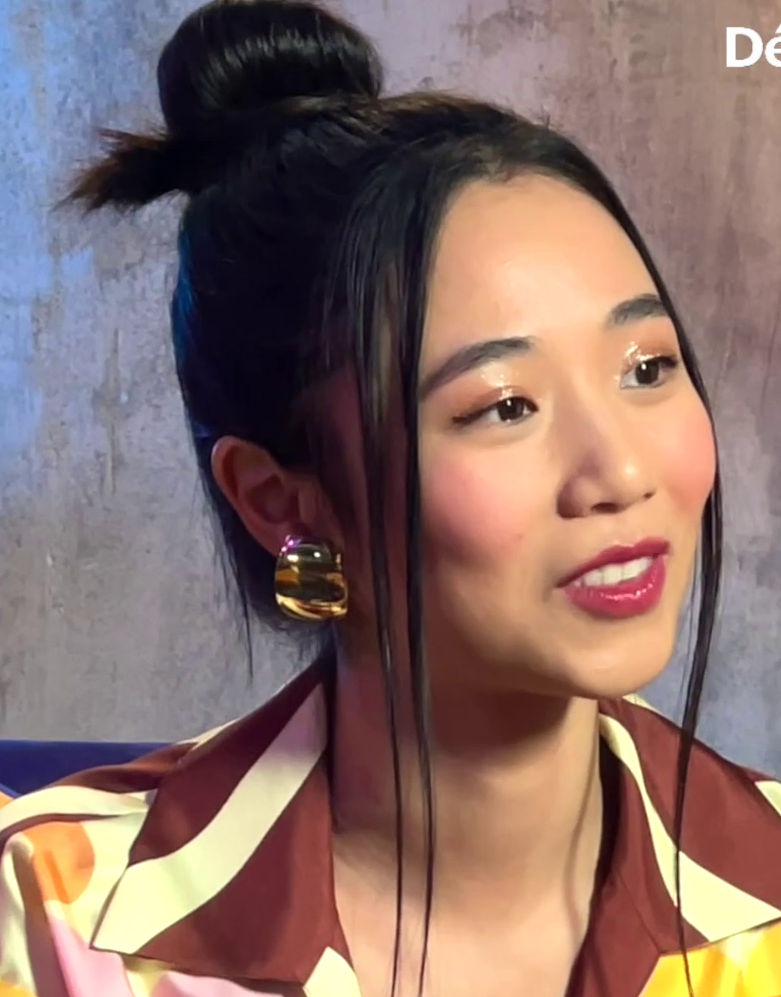
- Born: 12 December 1996 (age 29); Beijing, China
- Education: LUISS Business School
- Occupation: Actress

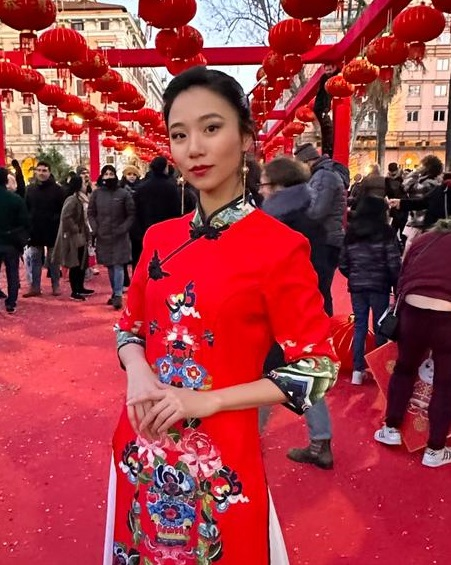
Elisa at the Lantern Festival Rome Italy 2023

Elisa Wong (born 12 December 1996) is a Chinese-born Italian actress.

== Biography ==
Wong was born in Beijing, China. After few years in Changchun, she grew up in Rome, Italy. She graduated in Economics and Management at LUISS Business School. After a brief experience in an accounting firm, she decided to pursue her acting career full time.

She made her debut in 2017 with the film A Family (2017), directed by Sebastiano Riso.

In 2018, she appeared in the music video of the song "Bye Bye" by singer Annalisa.

She made her TV debut in 2021, playing Robbi in the Netflix series Zero. In the same year, she posed for the advertising of Gucci 100 Years and Costa Cruises.

In 2022, she starred in the second season of POV—I primi anni, distributed by Rai Gulp, as Stella. In the same year she played a translator in the series The Net—Gioco di Squadra, distributed on RaiPlay, and took part in the advertisements for Sushi Daily, the Saudi Arabia tourism board, and The Mall outlets.

In 2023, she played Kumiko in the series Il Clandestino, broadcast on Rai1, and in the Amazon Prime Video series Love Club!, where she played Yan. Also in 2023, she was part of the film Indagine su una storia d'amore, directed by Gianluca Maria Tavarelli.

In the same year, she began filming the third season of Doc – Nelle tue mani as the new resident Lin Wang.

== Filmography ==
=== Film ===
Year	Title	Role(s)	Notes
2017	A Family	Chinese girl	Uncredited
2023	Indagine su una storia d'amore	Massagist	Cameo
2023	In fuga con Babbo Natale	Mama Wong	
2025	Forbidden City	Mei's Mother	

=== Television ===
Year	Title	Role(s)	Notes
2021	Zero	Robbi	Main role (credited as Eli Song)
2022	POV - I primi anni	Stella	Main role (season 2)
2022–2023	The Net	Traslator of Wang Li	4 episodes
2023	Love Club	Yan	Episode: "Zhang"
2024	Il clandestino	Kumiko	Episode: "Chinatown"
2024–present	Doc – Nelle tue mani	Dr. Lin Wang	Main role (season 3-present)
2025	Blocco 181	Kiro	Episode: "Episodio 6"

=== Music videos ===
Year	Title	Artist(s)	Notes
2018	"Bye Bye"	Annalisa	
