= A Love (1999 film) =

- Directed by: Gianluca Maria Tavarelli
- Screenplay by: Gianluca Maria Tavarelli; Leonardo Fasoli
- Story by: Gianluca Maria Tavarelli
- Produced by: Maurizio Pastrovich
- Starring: Lorenza Indovina; Fabrizio Gifuni
- Cinematography: Pietro Sciortino
- Edited by: Marco Spoletini
- Music by: Ezio Bosso
- Release date: 1999
- Running time: 97 minutes
- Country: Italy
- Language: Italian

A Love (Italian: Un amore) is a 1999 Italian romance film written and directed by Gianluca Maria Tavarelli and starring Fabrizio Gifuni and Lorenza Indovina.

== Cast ==
- Lorenza Indovina as Sara
- Fabrizio Gifuni as Marco
- Luciano Federico as Filippo
- Roberta Lena as Veronica
- Riccardo Montanaro as The Investigator
- Ezio Sega as The Professor

== See also ==
- List of Italian films of 1999
