= The End? =

- Directed by: Daniele Misischia
- Written by: Cristiano Ciccotti; Daniele Misischia
- Produced by: Manetti Bros. Carlo Macchitella
- Starring: Alessandro Roja; Carolina Crescentini; Claudio Camilli
- Cinematography: Angelo Sorrentino
- Edited by: Federico Maria Maneschi
- Music by: Isac Roitn
- Production companies: Mompracem; Rai Cinema
- Distributed by: 01 Distribution; EuroVideo
- Release date: August 27, 2017
- Running time: 100 minutes
- Country: Italy
- Language: Italian

The End? (also known as The End? L'inferno fuori) is a 2017 Italian zombie horror and thriller film directed by Daniele Misischia and starring Alessandro Roja, Carolina Crescentini, and Claudio Camilli. It was initially released on August 27, 2017 in the UK.

== Plot ==
One day, Claudio Verona, a successful but self-centered businessman becomes trapped in his office elevator alone. He was on his way to attend an important business meeting with a client. He attempts to call his wife, Lorena, on his mobile and tries speaking through the lift communications to the building maintenance technicians. However, for a very long time, no one seems to come to his assistance. Slowly losing his patience, he pries open the door to the lift but the opening is too narrow and he is unable to get out.

Unknown to Claudio, a deadly and infectious virus has begun to spread in the city. The virus appears to transform regular people into extremely violent and dangerous zombies. Claudio wants to get out of this claustrophobic space, but as the events unfold, he witnesses the effects of the virus. Suddenly, the confined space of the elevator seemed like a safe haven for him. He can only watch helplessly as people that he knows either turn into zombies or get slaughtered by the other zombies roaming the building. He eventually meets a policeman willing to help rescue him, who will act as a counter to Claudio's negative traits.

The film tries to focus on the human side of a zombie apocalypse. Claudio starts as an arrogant and ruthless individual, but learns to be a better person after witnessing the apocalypse around him.

== Cast ==
- Alessandro Roja as Claudio Verona
- Carolina Crescentini as Lorena (voice)
- Claudio Camilli as Marcello
- Euridice Axen as Marta
- Benedetta Cimatti as Silvia
- Bianca Friscelli as Sara
- Roberto Scotto Pagliara as Riccardo
- Marco Manetti as Technician (voice)
- Daniele Nisi as Security agent

== Reception ==
The movie was received with applause at FrightFest in London. However, The End? had mixed reviews, with Review aggregator IMDb giving it a 5.3 rating. Critics praised the acting of Alessandro Roja, but also criticized the lack of interesting uses of the film's narrow setting.
