= The Beast (2020 film) =

2020 Italian film

- Film poster
- Italian: La belva
- Directed by: Ludovico Di Martino
- Screenplay by: Claudia De Angelis; Ludovico Di Martino; Nicola Ravera
- Story by: Andrea Paris
- Produced by: Fabio Ferraro; Matteo Rovere
- Starring: Fabrizio Gifuni
- Cinematography: Luca Esposito
- Edited by: Francesco Loffredo
- Music by: Andrea Manusso; Matteo Nesi
- Production companies: Groenlandia; Warner Bros. Entertainment Italia; Regione Lazio
- Distributed by: Warner Bros. Pictures (Theatrical); Netflix (VOD)
- Release date: 27 November 2020; (VOD)
- Running time: 97 minutes
- Country: Italy
- Language: Italian

The Beast (Italian: La belva) is a 2020 Italian action thriller film directed by Ludovico Di Martino and starring Fabrizio Gifuni, Lino Musella and Monica Piseddu.

== Cast ==
- Fabrizio Gifuni as Leonida Riva
- Lino Musella as Antonio Simonetti
- Monica Piseddu as Angela
- Andrea Pennacchi as Mozart
- Emanuele Linfatti as Mattia Riva
- Nicolò Galasso as Peppe
- Giacomo Colavito as Emanuele
- Giada Gagliardi as Teresa Riva
- Gianmarco Vettori as Faina
- Silvia Gallerano as La Mastina
- Massimiliano Setti as officer Belli
- Daria Deflorian as Dr. Di Nardi
- Stefano Guerrieri as officer Petrassi
- Francesca Turrini as officer Floris
- Marco Mario De Notaris as the head of the Mastiffs
- Andrei Nova as Ivan
