= L'amore ormai =

2014 film directed by Roberto Gneo and Massimo Pellegrinotti

- L'amore ormai poster
- Directed by: Roberto Gneo; Massimo Pellegrinotti
- Screenplay by: Roberto Gneo; Massimo Pellegrinotti
- Produced by: Roberto Gneo; Massimo Pellegrinotti
- Starring: Silvia Mazzieri; Luca Avallone; Emanuele Guzzardi
- Cinematography: Susanna Sala
- Edited by: Riccardo Nardi
- Music by: Francesco Fortunato
- Release date: 2014
- Running time: 24 minutes
- Country: Italy
- Language: Italian

L'amore ormai is a 2014 short film written and directed by Roberto Gneo and Massimo Pellegrinotti. The film shows the complicated relationship between love and jealousy through the characters' one-day stories.

== Plot ==
A boy phones his ex-girlfriend after 2 years, asking to see each other. After the meeting, he persuades her to go to his place, where he tries to get her back. Following her refusal, the boy creepily turns into a kind of werewolf.

== Production ==
The budget of the film consisted of less than €2.000. The footage lasted only 4 days, despite having been meticulously prepared for a long time. The entire film is in black and white, with the exception of flashbacks. Soundtrack completely misses but in the last 10 seconds of the film and during the ending credits. Shots are focused on the characters.

== Reception ==
Reviewers defined the film ambitious and surrealistic, with a touch of gothic and horror styles. The underlying plot was considered existentialist. In particular, they appreciated the topical reflection about damaged love, which can result from too much love.

The monochrome choice was said to be elegant and functional to underline the protagonist's bipolarity and the dichotomy between damaged and non-damaged love, in a succession of different feelings.

The absence of soundtrack was judged brave yet useful to dramatise and focus on the images, which critics considered very detailed. Little gestures and looks are sometimes far more effective than words, an idea the pauses and silent scenes remarkably highlighted.

The shots were aimed at creating a suffocating atmosphere.

=== Accolades ===
- Jaipur International Film Festival 2015: Official Selection
