= Doc (2026 TV series) =

- Genre: Medical drama
- Based on: Doc – Nelle tue mani by: Francesco Arlanch; Viola Rispoli
- Developed by: Sandra García Velten
- Directed by: Francisco Franco Alba; Andrés F. López; Harold Ariza Cortés
- Starring: Juan Pablo Medina; Gabriela de la Garza; Stephanie Cayo
- Composer: Camilo Sanabria
- Country of origin: Mexico
- Original language: Spanish
- No. of seasons: 1
- No. of episodes: 40

Production
- Executive producers: Carlos Quintanilla Sakar; Alejandro García
- Producer: Leonardo Olarte
- Cinematography: Carlos Arango; Freddy Castro Uribe
- Editor: Jhon Casas
- Production company: Sony Pictures Television

Original release
- Network: Netflix
- Release: March 9, 2026 – present

Doc is an Mexican medical drama television series developed by Sandra García Velten. It is based on the Italian series Doc – Nelle tue mani, created by Francesco Arlanch and Viola Rispoli. The series stars Juan Pablo Medina, Gabriela de la Garza and Stephanie Cayo. The series premiered on Netflix on 4 March 2026, followed by a second part released on 27 March 2026.

== Plot ==
The series follows Andrés Ferrara, a head of internal medicine known for his authoritarian, distant, and demanding style toward his colleagues and patients. His professional and personal life takes a radical turn after surviving an assassination attempt that causes him to lose his memory of the last twelve years. Upon waking, Ferrara realizes his reality is no longer the same; his personal relationships have changed, the hospital environment has evolved, and he himself must question his former work ethic.

== Cast ==
=== Main ===
- Juan Pablo Medina as Dr. Andrés Ferrara "Doc"
- Gabriela de la Garza as Dr. Ximena Franco
- Stephanie Cayo as Dr. Julia Jasso
- Iván Sánchez as Dr. Marco Santamaría
- Macarena García Romero as Dr. Alba Granados
- Martín Saracho as Dr. Ricardo Quintana
- Nicolasa Ortíz Monasterio as Dr. Elisa Gaona
- José Ramón Barreto as Dr. José Ramos
- Valentina Buzzurro as Carolina Ferrara
  - Fernanda Salgado as child Carolina
- Giuseppe Gamba as Dr. Lorenzo Torres
- Montserrat Marañón as Teresa Contreras
- Martín Altomaro as Dr. Enrique Rentería
- Natalia Plascencia as Dr. Constanza Ontiveros
- Rubén Zamora as Raúl Castillo
- Erick Chapa as Dr. David Valadares
- Claudette Maillé as Dr. Fabiola Martínez

=== Recurring ===
- Alejandra Ambrosi as Irene Andrade
- Constantino García as Matías Ferreira
- Daniel Toro as Darío Corona
- Rafer Valderrama as Renato
- Daniela Schmidt as Dr. Cecilia Alcocer
- Ximena Romo as Dr. Raquel Aguirre
- Juan Carlos Ortega as Abogado Rivas
- Adriana Montes de Oca as Clara
- Ximena Palacios as Susana
- Leónidas Urbina as Uriel

=== Guest stars ===
- Fernando Berzosa as Ernesto Quiñones
- Florencia Ríos as Alicia
- Patricio Tenoch as Óscar
- Arath Aquino as Jacobo
- Merena Dimont as Amalia
- Constanza Hernández as Inés
- Abril Manjares as Marisa
- Pablo Rodríguez as Esteban
- Germán Bracco as Fabio Lasso
- Gabriela Díaz as Marcela
- Ángela Duarte as Georgina
- Ana Bertha Espín as Socorro Aguilar
- Ana Karina Guevara as Leticia Olivares
- Daniela Romero as Sofía
- Carlos Gutiérrez as Pablo

== Production ==
Filming of the series took place from May to September 2025.

== Release ==
The series was divided into two parts, with the first twenty episodes having been released on 4 March 2026, and another twenty episodes being released on 27 March 2026.
