= Simona Tabasco =

Italian actress (born 1994)

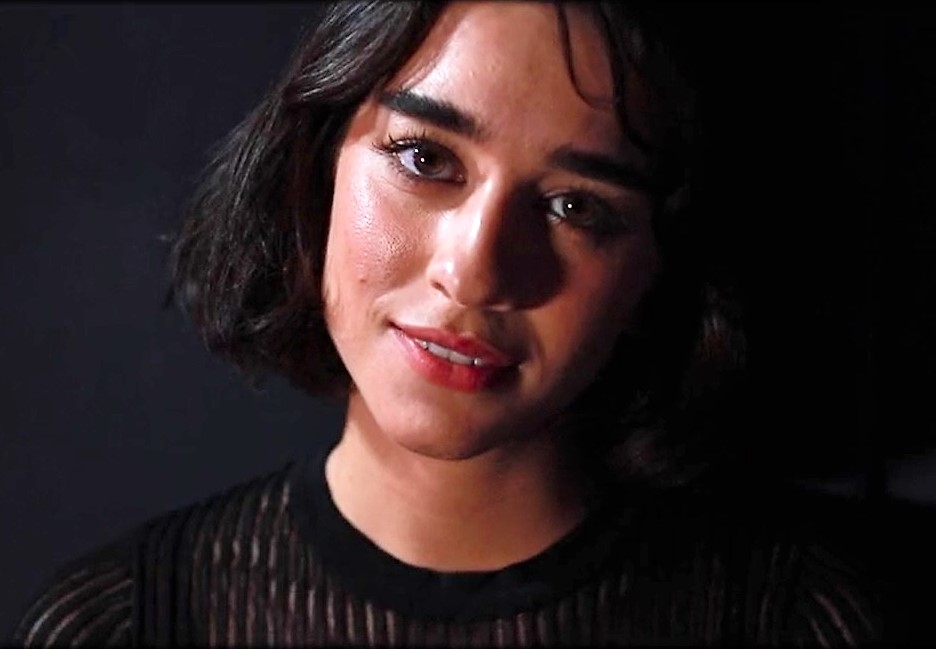
- Tabasco in 2022
- Born: 5 April 1994 (age 32); Naples, Italy
- Education: Centro Sperimentale di Cinematografia
- Occupation: Actress
- Years active: 2013–present

Simona Tabasco (born 5 April 1994) is an Italian actress. Tabasco played the role of Lucia Greco in the second season of the HBO black comedy-drama series The White Lotus, which earned her a Primetime Emmy Award nomination. She also gained recognition for her supporting role in the Italian neo-noir film Perez. (2014) and as Elisa Russo in the Rai 1 medical drama Doc – Nelle tue mani (2020–present).

== Early life ==
Simona Tabasco was born in Naples on 5 April 1994. She is the daughter of an advertising graphic designer and an office worker. She has a twin brother named Marco.

== Career ==
In 2013, after shooting two short films at the Giffoni Film Festival, Tabasco was cast in the second season of the Italian teen drama series Fuoriclasse. Broadcast on Rai 1 in March 2014, Tabasco portrayed Aida Merlissi, a Muslim girl. Filming for Fuoriclasse interrupted her studies at the Centro Sperimentale di Cinematografia in Rome, ultimately leading to her expulsion due to repeated absences.

In 2014, she made her film debut in Edoardo De Angelis's Perez., which received critical acclaim. For her role as Tea, daughter of the protagonist Demetrio (portrayed by Luca Zingaretti), Tabasco was awarded the Premio Guglielmo Biraghi at the 2015 Nastro d'Argento awards.

Since 2020, Tabasco has starred in the Italian medical drama Doc – Nelle tue mani, playing Elisa Russo, a resident in internal medicine.

In 2022, Tabasco made her international debut in the second season of the HBO anthology series The White Lotus. Her performance as Lucia, a sex worker in Sicily, received praise. CNN's Brian Lowry wrote that it "feels like a breakout role". Nylon magazine deemed her the "lifeblood" of the show, writing, "Lucia's energy is so infectious, thanks to the frenzied, effortless performance from Tabasco". Tabasco won the Screen Actors Guild Award for Outstanding Performance by an Ensemble in a Drama Series along with the cast of The White Lotus. She also received an Emmy nomination in 2023 for Outstanding Supporting Actress in a Drama Series for her portrayal.

In February 2023, Tabasco was cast opposite Sydney Sweeney in the psychological horror film Immaculate.

In March 2023, Tabasco was included in Forbes magazine's annual 30 Under 30 list, which recognises the 30 most influential people in Europe under the age of 30.

In May 2024, she was attached to a prospective film titled Cloud One.

In October 2026, she starred as one of the lead characters in Amazon's Masterplan alongside Stanley Tucci and Victor Belmondo.

== Filmography ==
=== Film ===
Year	Title	Role	Notes
2014	Perez.	Tea Perez	
2016	I babysitter	Sonia	
2018	Bob & Marys	Ursula	
2020	The Ties	Delivery girl	
2024	Immaculate	Sister Mary	
2024	Liberato's Secret	Lucia	Voice role
2024	Ma chi ti conosce	Silvia	
2026	Masterplan	Chiara	

=== Television ===
Year	Title	Role	Notes
2014–2015	Fuoriclasse	Aida Merlissi	16 episodes
2015–2018	È arrivata la felicità	Nunzia	48 episodes
2017–2023	The Bastards of Pizzofalcone	Alex Di Nardo	20 episodes
2019	1994	Gabriella	Episode: Season 3, Episode 8
2020–2024	Doc – Nelle tue mani	Elisa Russo	33 episodes (Regular in season 1 and 2, plus a cameo in episode 3x06)
2021	Luna Park	Nora	6 episodes
2022	The White Lotus	Lucia Greco	7 episodes (Regular in season 2)

=== Music videos ===
Year	Title	Artist	Notes	Ref.
2019	"Rose viola"	Ghemon		
2019	"Scusate se non piango"	Daniele Silvestri		
2019	"Vento del Sud"	Tiromancino		
2023	"Furore"	Paola & Chiara		

== Awards and nominations ==
Accolades received by Simona Tabasco
Year	Award	Category	Work	Result	Ref.
2014	Galà del Cinema e della Fiction in Campania	Best Cinema Actress	Perez.	Won	
2015	Nastro d'Argento	Premio Guglielmo Biraghi	Perez.	Won	
2015	Nastro d'Argento	Premio Wella per l'immagine	Perez.	Won	
2015	Venice Film Festival	Premio L'Oréal Paris per il cinema		Nominated	
2023	Screen Actors Guild Awards	Outstanding Performance by an Ensemble in a Drama Series (shared with the ensemble cast)	The White Lotus	Won	
2023	MTV Movie & TV Awards	Best Duo (shared with Beatrice Grannò)	The White Lotus	Nominated	
2023	Primetime Emmy Awards	Outstanding Supporting Actress in a Drama Series	The White Lotus	Nominated	
