= Probably Love =

2001 film by Giuseppe Bertolucci

- Directed by: Giuseppe Bertolucci
- Starring: Sonia Bergamasco; Fabrizio Gifuni
- Cinematography: Fabio Cianchetti
- Music by: Almamegretta
- Distributed by: Variety Distribution
- Release date: 2001
- Country: Italy

Probably Love (Italian: L'amore probabilmente) is a 2001 Italian drama film directed by Giuseppe Bertolucci. It entered the "Cinema of the Present" section at the 58th Venice International Film Festival. Variety's film critic Deborah Young referred to it as "one of the most experimental fictional films to come out of Italy in many a moon". For his performance in this film Fabrizio Gifuni was appointed EFP Shooting Star at the 52nd Berlin International Film Festival.

== Cast ==
- Sonia Bergamasco: Sofia
- Fabrizio Gifuni: Cesare
- Rosalinda Celentano: Chiara
- Marcello Catalano: Gerard
- Teco Celio: Pietro
- Carmen Scarpitta: Laura
- Mariangela Melato: The acting teacher
- Stefania Sandrelli: Herself
- Alida Valli: Herself
