= Once Upon a Time the City of Fools =

2010 Italian biographical drama film

- Italian: C'era una volta la città dei matti...
- Genre: Biographical drama
- Written by: Alessandro Sermoneta; Katja Colja; Marco Turco
- Directed by: Marco Turco
- Starring: Fabrizio Gifuni; Sandra Toffolatti; Vittoria Puccini
- Country of origin: Italy
- Original language: Italian

Production
- Producer: Claudia Mori
- Running time: 90 minutes (each of two episodes)

Original release
- Network: Rai Uno
- Release: 7 February – 8 February 2010

Once Upon a Time the City of Fools (Italian: C'era una volta la città dei matti...) is a 2010 Italian two-parts biographical drama television film.

The film was shot in 2009. Its screenplay was written by Marco Turco, who also directed it. Rai Fiction and Ciao Ragazzi! produced the film under the direction of Claudia Mori. The film was shown at Bari International Film & TV Festival on 25 January 2010 in Teatro Petruzzelli as well as on 7 and 8 February 2010 at TV channel Rai Uno.

The film includes two episodes. The first episode of the film was watched by 5.442 million viewers, the second one was watched by 5.9 million viewers.

== Plot ==
The film treats of the activities of Franco Basaglia who revolutionized Italian psychiatry and shows the degrading situation that existed in Italian psychiatric hospitals before the passing of Basaglia Law.

== Awards ==
The film has received Golden Nymphs Award as the best film and for the best man role in the film at Festival de Television in Montecarlo and Silver Magnolia Award for Best Television Film at the 16th Shanghai Television Festival.
