= Silvia Mazzieri =

Italian actress

- Born: 23 February 1993 (age 33); Pisa, Tuscany, Italy
- Occupation: Actress
- Years active: 2015–present
- Children: 1

Silvia Mazzieri (born 23 February 1993) is an Italian actress, especially known for her appearances in RAI television series.

== Life and career ==
Mazzieri was born on 23 February 1993 in Pisa to Adelina Maccari and Luciano Mazzieri. She spent her childhood and adolescence in Abbadia San Salvatore in Siena, along with her older brother, who has special needs. A competitive sprinter at a young age, she also showed an early aptitude for the show business.

While in high school, Mazzieri was encouraged by her family and entered the Miss Italia contest in 2010, where she was voted Miss Cinema.

Later, she began to study acting, initially in the theatre Il Genio della Lampada of Florence until 2011, then in the acting and voice acting academy Actor's Planet of Rome until 2014, and finally in Gisella Burinato’s C.I.A.P.A. Acting School in Rome until 2015. During those years, Mazzieri acted in advertisements and short film projects, including L'amore ormai (2014).

In 2015, she appeared in the sixth season of Provaci ancora prof! In 2015–2016, Mazzieri played Bella, the friend and later girlfriend of one of the main characters, in the second and third season of Braccialetti rossi. Mazzieri also worked in Il paradiso delle signore as Silvana Maffeis, a cineophile salesgirl and fan of Audrey Hepburn’s, who dreams of becoming a famous actress.

In 2017, she was in La strada di casa as a woman, Irene Ghilardi, carrying out an investigation into her brother's suspicious death.

In 2020, she started playing Alba Patrizi, a medical resident, in Doc - Nelle tue mani. In the same year, she started playing Giada Ruggero in Vivi e lascia vivere.

In 2021, she played Claudia in the movie Bentornato papà.

On 1 June 2022, Mazzieri gives birth to her first child, Greta.

== Filmography ==
=== Film and television ===
Year	Title	Role(s)	Notes
2014	Lobby Girls	Roberta	Short film
2015	Provaci ancora prof!	Ambra Fassone	Recurring role; 8 episodes
2015–2016	Braccialetti rossi	Bella	Main role (seasons 2–3); 13 episodes
2015–2017	Il paradiso delle signore	Silvana Maffeis	Main role (seasons 1–2); 40 episodes
2017	Once (In My Life)	Bea	Short film
2017–2019	La strada di casa	Irene Ghilardi	Main role; 24 episodes
2020	Vivi e lascia vivere	Giada Ruggiero	Main role; 12 episodes
2020–2022	Doc – Nelle tue mani	Alba Patrizi	Main role (seasons 1–2); 32 episodes
2021	Bentornato papà	Silvia	Film
