= Lino Musella =

Italian actor (born 1980)

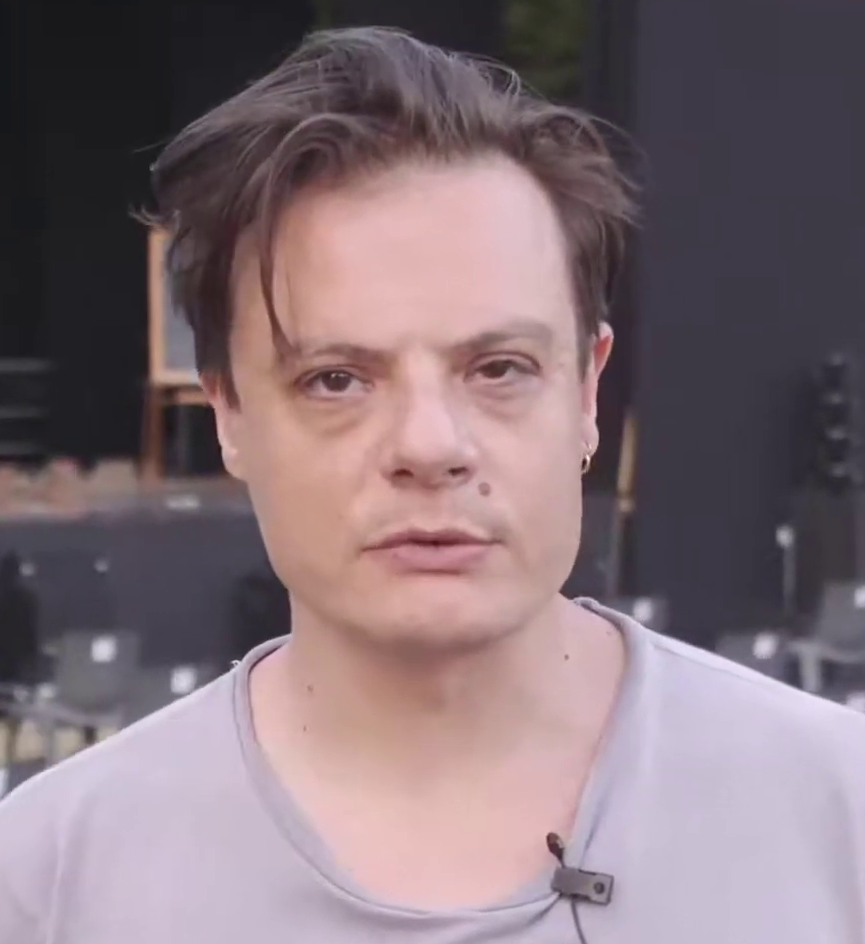
- Musella in 2020
- Born: 21 October 1980 (age 46); Naples, Italy
- Occupation: Actor

Lino Musella (born 21 October 1980) is an Italian film, stage and television actor.

== Life and career ==
Born in Naples, Musella studied at the Naples Academy of Dramatic Art and the Paolo Grassi Civic School in Milan. Mainly active in theater, in 2009 he formed the Musella-Mazzarelli stage company together with Paolo Mazzarelli. In 2013, he made his film debut in Happy Days Motel, and in 2015 he had his breakout with the role of Rosario 'o Nano Ercolano in the crime series Gomorrah.

In 2019, Musella was awarded the theatrical prize Premio Ubu for best actor for his performance in Jan Fabre's The Night Writer. In 2021, he was nominated for a David di Donatello award in the Best Supporting Actor category for his performance in Damiano and Fabio D'Innocenzo's film Bad Tales. In 2026, Musella won the David di Donatello for Best Supporting Actor for his performance in Valerio Mastandrea's Feeling Better (Nonostante).

== Filmography ==
=== Film ===
Year	Title	Role(s)	Notes
2013	Happy Days Motel	Killer	Short film
2014	Perez.	Latella	
2018	Ride	Mauro	
2018	Loro	Neapolitan Man	Uncredited
2020	The Bad Poet	Carletto	
2020	The Beast	Antonio Simonetti	
2020	Bad Tales	Professor Bernardini	
2020	Il ladro di cardellini	Gioacchino Strato	
2020	You Came Back	Simone	
2020	Tigers	Luca	
2021	We Still Talk	Nino Sgarbi (Young)	
2021	The King of Laughter	Benedetto Croce	
2021	The Hand of God	Mariettiello	
2021	The Hidden Child	Diego	
2022	Princess	Corrado	
2022	The Shadow of the Day	Osvaldo Lucchini	
2022	Il pataffio	Marconte Berlocchio	
2022	Il Boemo	Man at Theatre	Cameo
2023	Ferrari	Sergio Scaglietti	
2024	Arsa	Arsa's Father	
2024	La scommessa – Una notte in corsia	Salvatore	
2024	Feeling Better	Curiosone	
2024	Ho visto un re	Fausto	
2025	Unicorni	Stefano	
2026	The Fire Within You	Antonio	
2026	Il rumore delle cose nuove †		Post-production

=== Television ===
Year	Title	Role(s)	Notes
2014–2016	Gomorrah	Rosario "O'Nano" Ercolano	16 episodes
2016	The Young Pope	Tonino's Disciple	Episode: "Episode 4"
2019	Liberi tutti	Domenico	12 episodes
2022	Solo per passione – Letizia Battaglia fotografa	Pier Paolo Pasolini	Television movie
2022	L'Ora – Inchiostro contro piombo	Luciano Liggio	4 episodes
2024	My Brilliant Friend	Marcello Solara	7 episodes
2026	Portobello	Giovanni Pandico	6 episodes
