= Portobello (2025 TV series) =

Italian television miniseries by Marco Bellocchio

- Italian HBO Max poster
- Genre: Biographical drama; Legal drama
- Based on: Lettere a Francesca by Enzo Tortora
- Written by: Marco Bellocchio; Stefano Bises; Giordana Mari; Peppe Fiore
- Directed by: Marco Bellocchio
- Starring: Fabrizio Gifuni; Lino Musella; Romana Maggiora Vergano; Barbora Bobuľová; Carlotta Gamba; Alessandro Preziosi; Fausto Russo Alesi; Salvatore D'Onofrio
- Composer: Teho Teardo
- Countries of origin: Italy; France
- Original language: Italian
- No. of episodes: 6

Production
- Producers: Lorenzo Mieli; Mario Gianani; Simone Gattoni
- Cinematography: Francesco Di Giacomo
- Editor: Francesca Calvelli
- Production companies: Our Films; Kavac Film; Arte France; The Apartment Pictures

Original release
- Network: HBO Max (Note: Despite being marketed as an "HBO Original," the series will be released directly on HBO Max as HBO is only available as a content hub within the service in Italy.)
- Release: 20 February – 27 March 2026

Portobello is a biographical drama television miniseries co-written and directed by Marco Bellocchio, based on the 2016 posthumous nonfiction book Lettere a Francesca by Enzo Tortora. It stars Fabrizio Gifuni as Tortora, a famous RAI television host whose career was interrupted by allegations of mafia ties in the 1980s. The series also stars Lino Musella, Romana Maggiora Vergano, Barbora Bobuľová, Gianfranco Gallo, Alessandro Preziosi and Valeria Marini.

The first two episodes of the series premiered out of competition at the 82nd Venice International Film Festival on 1 September 2025. The series premiered globally on HBO Max on 20 February 2026. It received positive reviews from critics.

== Premise ==
In 1983, Enzo Tortora, host of the popular RAI variety show Portobello, is arrested on charges of mafia ties and drug trafficking, after numerous former Camorra members give false testimonies, including Giovanni Pandico and Pasquale Barra. By the early 1980s, the Nuova Camorra Organizzata, based in Naples and led by Raffaele Cutolo, was under heavy scrutiny in Italy, specially for the inability of the Italian judiciary to disassemble it. After Pandico, Barra, and Giovanni Melluso testify, Tortora goes to trial under circumstantial evidence. Giorgio Fontana, the investigating judge who orchestrated Tortora's arrest, denies multiple house arrest requests from Tortora, despite his deteriorating health.

After Tortora is granted house arrest in 1985, the center-left Radical Party offers him a candidacy to the European Parliament, which he wins in a landslide. In 1986, the Court of Appeals of Naples fully acquits Tortora of his charges, after which he returns for a final season of Portobello in February 1987. However, Tortora develops lung cancer and dies in May 1988. The series associates his death with the Chernobyl disaster, which had exposed most of Europe's population to nuclear contamination.

== Cast ==
- Fabrizio Gifuni as Enzo Tortora
- Barbora Bobuľová as Anna Tortora, Enzo's sister
- Romana Maggiora Vergano as Francesca Scopelliti, Enzo's third wife
- Carlotta Gamba as Silvia Tortora, Enzo's daughter
- Giada Fortini as Gaia Tortora, Enzo's daughter
- Davide Mancini as Raffaele Della Valle, Enzo's lawyer
- Paolo Pierobon as Alberto Dall'Ora, Enzo's lawyer
- Lino Musella as Giovanni Pandico
- Massimiliano Rossi as Pasquale Barra
- Alessio Praticò as Domenico Barbaro
- Gianfranco Gallo as Raffaele Cutolo
- Gualtiero Burzi as Angelo Citterio
- Fausto Russo Alesi as Diego Marmo
- Salvatore D'Onofrio as Giudice Michele Morello
- Gigi Savoia as Francesco Cedrangolo
- Tommaso Ragno as Marco Pannella, Radical Party leader
- Francesca Benedetti as Paola Borboni
- Pier Giorgio Bellocchio as Ugo
- Valeria Marini as Moira Orfei
- Alessandro Preziosi as Giorgio Fontana
- Fabrizio Contri as Cino Tortorella
- Alma Noce
- Gianluca Gobbi
- Antonia Truppo

== Episodes ==
No.	Title	Directed by	Written by	Original release date
1	"28 Million Viewers" (28 Milioni di Spettatori)	Marco Bellocchio	Story by : Marco Bellocchio & Stefano Bises & Giordana Mari; Teleplay by : Marco Bellocchio & Stefano Bises & Giordana Mari & Peppe Fiore	20 February 2026
2	"Jail" (Galera)	Marco Bellocchio	Story by : Marco Bellocchio & Stefano Bises & Giordana Mari; Teleplay by : Marco Bellocchio & Stefano Bises & Giordana Mari & Peppe Fiore	27 February 2026
3	"Infallible" (Infallibili)	Marco Bellocchio	Story by : Marco Bellocchio & Stefano Bises & Giordana Mari; Teleplay by : Marco Bellocchio & Stefano Bises & Giordana Mari & Peppe Fiore	6 March 2026
4	"The Infamous Column" (La colonna infame)	Marco Bellocchio	Story by : Marco Bellocchio & Stefano Bises & Giordana Mari; Teleplay by : Marco Bellocchio & Stefano Bises & Giordana Mari & Peppe Fiore	13 March 2026
5	"Merchant of Death" (Trafficante di morte)	Marco Bellocchio	Story by : Marco Bellocchio & Stefano Bises & Giordana Mari; Teleplay by : Marco Bellocchio & Stefano Bises & Giordana Mari & Peppe Fiore	20 March 2026
6	"Where Were We?" (Dove eravamo rimasti?)	Marco Bellocchio	Story by : Marco Bellocchio & Stefano Bises & Giordana Mari; Teleplay by : Marco Bellocchio & Stefano Bises & Giordana Mari & Peppe Fiore	27 March 2026

== Production ==
Principal photography began in September 2024. Filming took place in Rome, as well as Sardinia, Campania, and Lombardy.

== Release ==
A promotional clip was released on 17 June 2025. The first two episodes of the series were presented at the 82nd Venice International Film Festival on 1 September 2025. It was also presented at the Toronto International Film Festival and the BFI London Film Festival. The series premiered on HBO Max on 20 February 2026 as the platform's first Italian original series.
