= Empty Eyes (2001 film) =

2001 film by Andrea Porporati

- Directed by: Andrea Porporati
- Produced by: Marco Risi
- Starring: Fabrizio Gifuni; Valerio Mastandrea; Delia Boccardo; Gianni Cavina
- Cinematography: Franco Lecca
- Music by: Andrea Guerra
- Release date: 2001
- Country: Italy

Empty Eyes (Italian: Sole negli occhi) is a 2001 Italian drama film directed by Andrea Porporati.

== Cast ==
- Fabrizio Gifuni: Marco
- Gianni Cavina: Father of Marco
- Delia Boccardo: Mother of Marco
- Valerio Mastandrea: Agent Rinaldi
- Romuald Andrzej Klos: Mago Cilindro
