= Fabrizio Gifuni =

Italian actor (born 1966)

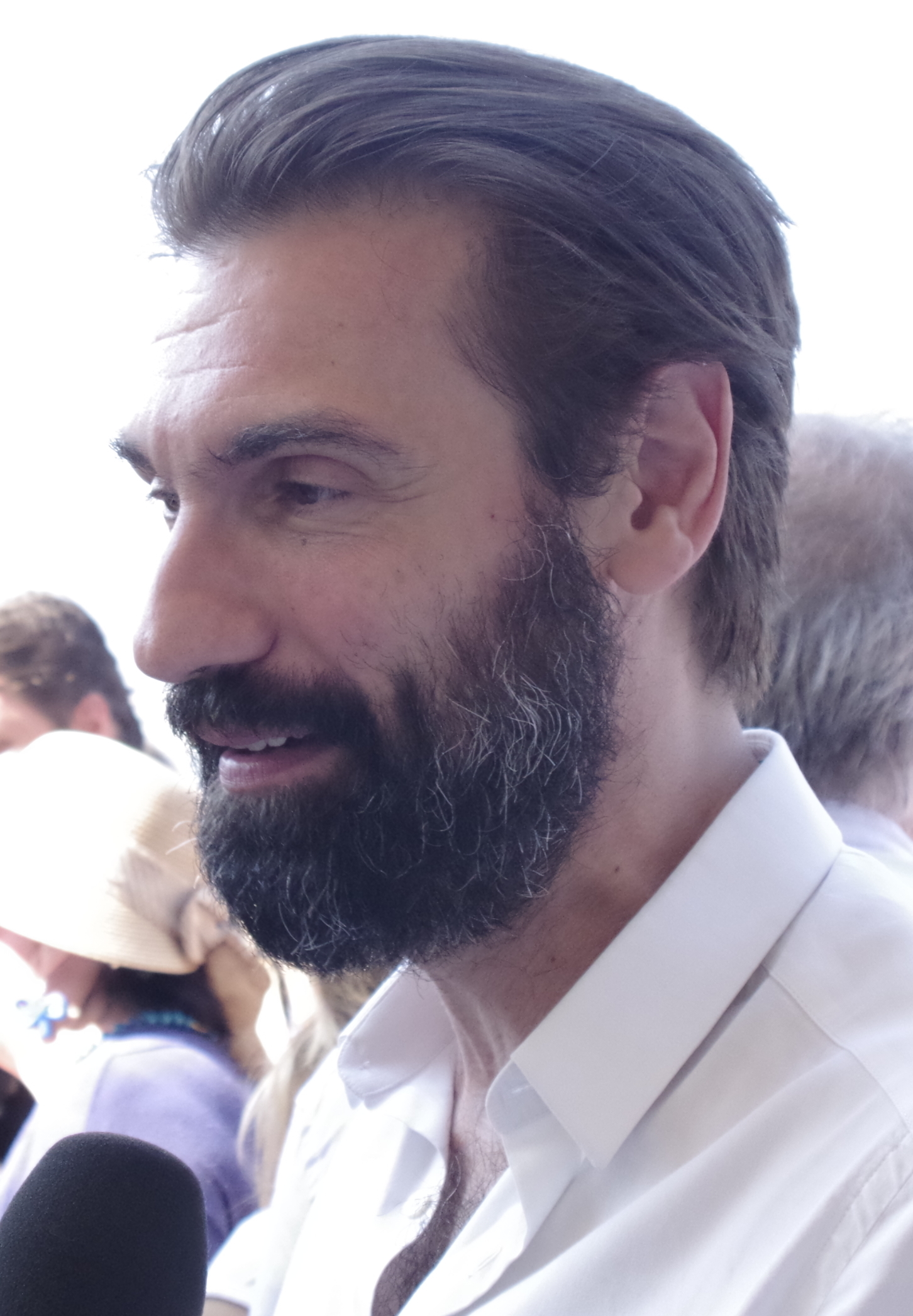
- Gifuni in 2014
- Born: 16 July 1966 (age 60); Rome, Italy
- Occupation: Actor
- Height: 1.84 m (6 ft 0 in)
- Spouse: Sonia Bergamasco (m. 2000)
- Children: 2
- Father: Gaetano Gifuni

Fabrizio Gifuni (born 16 July 1966) is an Italian stage, film and television actor. He won two Silver Ribbons and two David di Donatello Award.

== Life and career ==
Born in Rome, the son of the politician Gaetano, Gifuni enrolled at the Silvio D'Amico National Academy of Dramatic Art, graduating in 1992. He made his film debut in 1996, in La bruttina stagionata. Two years later he had his breakout role as Pelaia in Gianni Amelio's The Way We Laughed, then in 1999 he received a nomination for Best Actor at the David di Donatello for his performance in A Love.

In 2002 Gifuni was appointed EFP Shooting Star at the Berlin International Film Festival for his performance in Giuseppe Bertolucci's Probably Love. In 2003 thanks to his performance in The Best of Youth he received his second nomination for David di Donatello and won the Nastro d'Argento for Best Actor along with the rest of the male cast. He received a third nomination for David di Donatello in 2012, for Marco Tullio Giordana's Piazza Fontana: The Italian Conspiracy.

In 2014 he won the David di Donatello for Best Supporting Actor and the Nastro d'Argento for Best Actor for his role in Human Capital.

In 2023 he won the David di Donatello for Best Actor for his role of Aldo Moro in Marco Bellocchio's Exterior Night.

=== Personal life ===
Gifuni is married to actress Sonia Bergamasco, since 2000. They have two daughters.

He was son of politician Gaetano Gifuni, former Secretary General of the Italian President from 1992 to 2006 and former Minister for Parliamentary Relations in 1987.

== Filmography ==
=== Film ===
Year	Title	Role(s)	Notes
1993	Giovanni Falcone	Roberto Antiochia	
1996	La bruttina stagionata	Nicky	
1998	The Way We Laughed	Pelaia	
1999	A Love	Marco	
2000	La Carbonara	Zaccaria	
2000	This Is Not Paradise	Renato Sapienza	
2000	Johnny the Partisan	Ettore	
2001	Probably Love	Cesare	
2001	Hannibal	Matteo Deogracias	
2001	Empty Eyes	Marco	
2002	Winter	Leo	
2003	The Best of Youth	Carlo Tommasi	
2004	Movimenti	Marcello	
2005	Musikanten	Nicola	
2007	The Girl by the Lake	Corrado Canali	
2007	Miss F	Silvio	
2007	The Sweet and the Bitter	Stefano	
2008	Beket	Agent 06	
2008	The Brave Men	Ignazio De Raho	
2009	The Cézanne Affair	Gabriele Rossetti (adult)	
2010	Dark Love	Psychologist	Cameo appearance
2010	Let It Be	Sapient Man	Cameo appearance
2011	Kryptonite!	Dr. Matarrese	
2012	Piazza Fontana: The Italian Conspiracy	Aldo Moro	
2012	The Legend of Kaspar Hauser	Priest	
2013	Human Capital	Giovanni Bernaschi	
2014	Noi 4	Ettore	
2016	Sweet Dreams	Athos Giovanni	
2017	Dove non ho mai abitato	Massimo	
2020	The Beast	Leonida Riva	
2021	We Still Talk	Amicangelo	
2021	The Catholic School	Golgota	
2022	Exterior Night	Aldo Moro	
2022	I viaggiatori	Luzio	
2023	Mixed by Erry	Arturo	
2023	Kidnapped	Piergeatano Feletti	
2024	The Time It Takes	Luigi	

=== Television ===
Year	Title	Role(s)	Notes
2004	Le cinque giornate di Milano	Giovanni Grimaldo	Two-parts television movie
2005	De Gasperi – L'uomo della speranza	Alcide De Gasperi	Two-parts television movie
2008	Paul VI: The Pope in the Tempest	Pope Paul VI	Two-parts television movie
2010	Once Upon a Time the City of Fools	Franco Basaglia	Two-parts television movie
2018	Prima che la notte	Giuseppe Fava	Television movie
2022	Boris	Pierfrancesco Favino	Episode: "Gli occhi del cuore sacro di Gesù"
2024	My Brilliant Friend	Nino Sarratore	Main role (season 4)
2026	Portobello	Enzo Tortora	Lead role

== Awards and nominations ==
Award	Year	Category	Nominated work	Result	Ref.
Annecy Italian Film Festival	2014	Best Actor	Noi 4	Won	
Bari International Film Festival	2011	Fellini Achievement	Himself	Won	
Bari International Film Festival	2014	Best Actor	Human Capital	Won	
Bari International Film Festival	2023	Best Actor	Exterior Night	Won	
Bellaria Film Festival	2002	Best Actor	Probably Love	Won	
Berlin International Film Festival	2002	Shooting Star	Winter	Won	
Ciak d'Oro	2004	Best Supporting Actor	The Best of Youth	Nominated	
Ciak d'Oro	2014	Best Supporting Actor	Human Capital	Nominated	
Ciak d'Oro	2021	Best Actor	The Beast	Nominated	
Ciak d'Oro	2021	Best Supporting Actor	We Still Talk	Nominated	
Cinearti Award	2023	Best Actor	Exterior Night	Won	
David di Donatello	2000	Best Actor	A Love	Nominated	
David di Donatello	2004	Best Supporting Actor	The Best of Youth	Nominated	
David di Donatello	2008	Best Supporting Actor	The Girl by the Lake	Nominated	
David di Donatello	2012	Best Supporting Actor	Romanzo di una strage	Nominated	
David di Donatello	2014	Best Supporting Actor	Human Capital	Won	
David di Donatello	2023	Best Actor	Exterior Night	Won	
Efobo d'Oro	2008	Best Actor	The Girl by the Lake	Won	
European Independent Film Critics Award	2013	Best Supporting Actor	Romanzo di una strage	Nominated	
Globo D'Oro	2002	Revelation of the Year	Winter	Won	
Golden Graal	2006	Best Stage Performance: Drama	Na specie de cadavere lunghissimo	Won	
Golden Graal	2008	Best Actor: Drama	The Sweet and the Bitter	Nominated	
Golden Graal	2008	Best Actor: Drama	The Girl by the Lake	Nominated	
Grand Prix Corallo	2010	Best TV Actor	Once Upon a Time the City of Fools	Won	
IOFAD Award	2012	Best Supporting Actor	Romanzo di una strage	Nominated	
Italy On Screen Today	2023	Excellence Award	Himself	Won	
Le Maschere Awards	2011	Best Monologue	L'ingegner Gadda	Won	
Le Maschere Awards	2016	Best Monologue	Lo straniero	Won	
Maremetraggio Film Festival	2023	Best Actor	Exterior Night	Won	
Monte-Carlo Television Festival	2010	Best Actor	Once Upon a Time the City of Fools	Won	
Monte-Carlo Television Festival	2019	Best Actor	Prima che la notte	Nominated	
Nastro d'Argento	2002	Best Actor	Empty Eyes	Nominated	
Nastro d'Argento	2004	Best Actor	The Best of Youth	Won	
Nastro d'Argento	2012	Best Supporting Actor	Romanzo di una strage	Nominated	
Nastro d'Argento	2014	Best Actor	Human Capital	Won	
Nastro d'Argento	2021	Best Actor	The Beast	Nominated	
Nastro d'Argento	2021	Best Supporting Actor	We Still Talk	Nominated	
Nastro d'Argento	2023	Best Actor	Exterior Night	Won	
Otranto Film Fund Festival	2012	Cinema e Territori Award	Romanzo di una strage	Won	
Porretta Terme Film Festival	2022	Elio Petri Award	Himself	Won	
Premi Flaiano	2005	Best TV Performance	De Gasperi – L'uomo della speranza	Won	
Premi Flaiano	2023	Best Film Performance	Exterior Night	Won	
Premio Ischia	2005	Best Actor	De Gasperi – L'uomo della speranza	Won	
Premio Kineo	2012	Best Supporting Actor	Romanzo di una strage	Won	
Premio Kineo	2017	Best Actor	Sweet Dreams	Nominated	
Premio Kineo	2021	Best Actor	The Beast	Nominated	
Premio Kineo	2021	Best Supporting Actor	We Still Talk	Nominated	
Premio Napoli	2014	Lingua e Cultura Award	Himself	Won	
Premio Rodolfo Valentino	2005	Best Actor	De Gasperi – L'uomo della speranza	Won	
Premio Ubu	2010	Best Actor in a Play	L'ingegner Gadda	Won	
Premio Ubu	2015	Best Actor in a Play	Lehman Trilogy	Nominated	
Premio Vittorio De Sica	2002	Best Actor	Winter	Won	
Roma Fiction Fest	2010	Best Male Actor	Once Upon a Time the City of Fools	Won	
Rome Film Festival	2010	Social Movie Star Award	Once Upon a Time the City of Fools	Won	
Taormina Film Fest	2016	Cariddi d'Oro Award	Himself	Won	
Tertio Millennio Film Fest	2010	Navicella Award	Once Upon a Time the City of Fools	Won	
Venice Film Festival	2021	International Starlight Cinema Award	Himself	Won	
