= Ezio Bosso =

Italian composer and conductor (1971–2020)

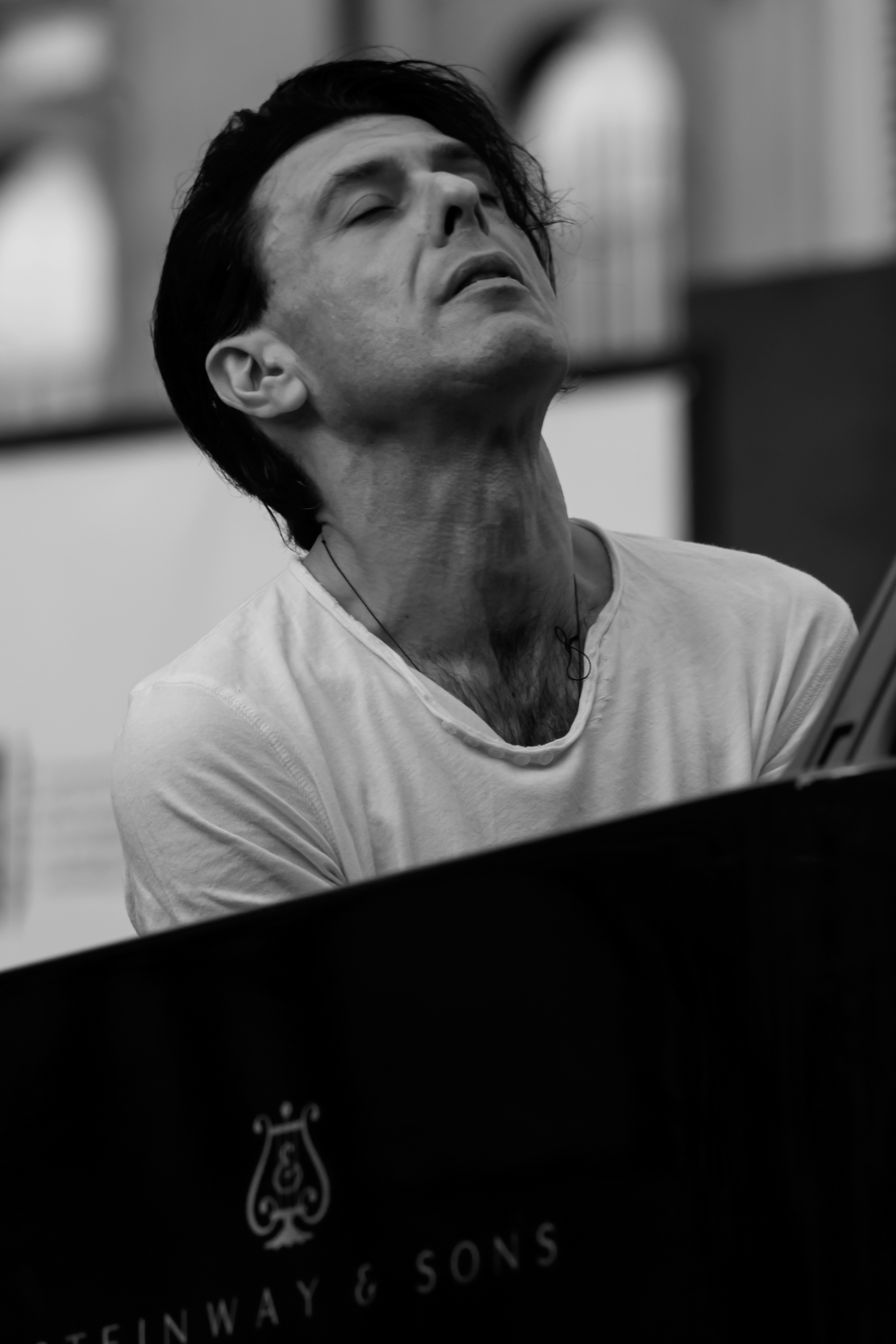
- Ezio Bosso playing in concert in 2017
- Born: 13 September 1971; Turin, Piedmont, Italy
- Died: 14 May 2020 (aged 48); Bologna, Emilia-Romagna, Italy
- Education: Wiener Musikakademie
- Occupations: Composer; Double Bassist; Pianist; Conductor
- Organizations: Statuto
- Awards: Green Room Award
- Website: www.eziobosso.com/en/biography/

Ezio Bosso (Italian: [ˈɛttsjo ˈbɔsso]; 13 September 1971 – 14 May 2020) was an Italian composer, pianist, double bass player, and conductor. He composed film scores such as Un amore and Gabriele Salvatores' Io non ho paura, and ballets which were performed by The Royal Ballet and the San Francisco Ballet, among others. As a pianist, he released a solo album which entered the Italian charts.

== Life ==
Born in Turin in 1971, Bosso learned to read and play music before he was four and started to have his first piano lessons with his aunt who was a pianist. He studied piano, double bass, and theory at Turin Conservatorium. At the age of 14, he became the bass player for the ska/rhythm-and-blues band Statuto. At the age of 16, he started his career as a double bass and piano soloist in France. He collaborated with orchestras including the Vienna Chamber Orchestra and the Chamber Orchestra of Europe. Bosso later abandoned popular music in order to become an orchestral conductor and classical composer, studying the double bass under Ludwig Streicher, composition under Claude Vivier and professor Schölckner, and conducting under Edgar Österreicher at the Vienna Music Academy. During his studies in Vienna he specialized on orchestra conducting and took lessons from great conductor Sergiu Celibidache who played crucial role for Bosso's career. He scored Gianluca Maria Tavarelli's Un amore (1999) and Gabriele Salvatores' Io non ho paura (2003).

In 2011, after undergoing surgery to remove a brain tumor, Bosso started suffering from a neurodegenerative syndrome. At first, the disease did not prevent him from playing, composing, and conducting music. He wrote ballet music, music for theatre, operas, film scores, five symphonies, concertos, and chamber music including string quartets, piano trios, and sonatas. He collaborated with soloists such as Mario Brunello and Sergei Krylov, and conducted orchestras including the London Symphony Orchestra. His compositions were featured in various performance art events, and theatrical productions. He also collaborated with theatre directors such as James Thiérrée and choreographers such as Rafael Bonachela.

On 30 October 2015, Bosso released his first solo studio album, The 12th Room. A collection of piano works including Bosso's own Piano Sonata, as well as music by Johann Sebastian Bach, Frédéric Chopin, Christoph Willibald Gluck, and John Cage's In a landscape, the album peaked at number three on the Italian FIMI albums chart, along with Adele and Coldplay. Some of Bosso's music for piano was compared to the work of Philip Glass.

In 2016, Bosso's music was used by the Royal Ballet for Christopher Wheeldon's Within the Golden Hour, which was first performed by the San Francisco Ballet. He also worked for La Scala in Milan and La Fenice in Venice, and received commissions from the Vienna State Opera, New York City Ballet and Bolshoi Theatre in Moscow.

In 2017, he started focusing more on conducting and composing. In September 2019, Bosso announced that due to his neurodegenerative illness, he was losing control of two fingers and was therefore no longer able to play the piano.

«Io li conosco I domani che non arrivano mai

Conosco la stanza stretta
E la luce che manca da cercare dentro

Io li conosco i giorni che passano uguali
Fatti di sonno e dolore e sonno

per dimenticare il dolore»

— Ezio Bosso, 14 March 2020

Bosso died in his home in Bologna on 14 May 2020 at the age of 48 after a long struggle with his illness.

== Awards ==
Bosso won several awards for his compositions, including the Australian Green Room Award and the Syracuse NY Award, and was nominated for two David di Donatello Awards.

== Compositions ==
Symphonies

- Symphony No.1: "Oceans"
- Symphony No.2: "Under the Trees" Voices
- Symphony No.3: "Four Letters" for string quartet and orchestra
- Symphony No.4: "Alma Mater"
- Little Symphony for a Pair of Glasses for orchestra

Compositions for orchestra

- Violin Concerto No.1 "ESOCONCERTO"
- Violin Concerto 1a for Violin, Strings and Timpani
- Violin Concerto No.2
- "Oceans" for Solo Cello and Orchestra (I Version, Only strings)
- Triplo Concerto For Piano, Violin, Cello and Orchestra
- Fantasia for Violin and Orchestra
- Adagio for cello and orchestra
- Divertimento concertante: fl, ob, cl, bsn, orchestra and piano
- Domes Of Freedom for Children Choir, orchestra and Mandolins orchestra
- Angeli 2 for orchestra
- Sea Song 2 Sea Prayer for cello and strings
- Sea Song 3 Waves and Hope for violin, cello and string orchestra
- Sea Song 6 Isles for string orchestra
- Sea Song 8 Fishes speech for 2 violins and strings
- Sea Song 9 sea rain for piano (or violin) and string orchestra
- Before the sea for cello orchestra
- African skies for double bass and strings
- Road Signs Variations for 11 instruments
- Entrance for solo viola, organ trumpet trombone and cello and orchestra
- The Cathedral in the Desert for and sax soprano and strings
- Speed limit, a night ride for string quartet and piano
- All directions for sax, trumpet, trombone, piano, el bass el guit, and strings
- Merge, one harm hug for strings
- Stop never stop the residence for sax, trumpet, trombone, piano, el bass el guitar, and string quartet
- Exit, Run 44 part 2 or sax, trumpet, trombone, piano, el. bass, el. guit, and string quartet
- The way of 1000 and 1 comet (orchestral version)
- African nights for solo bass (Viola or Cello) and String quartet (Also Orchestra)
- African skies for double bass and strings
- Angeli 3 for 2 oboes and strings
- Will and the chance for voice and ensemble
- Andante for piano orchestra choir and live electronic "postcards"
- Indian railway for double bass and winds
- My Thay for string orchestra

Duo

- Sonata No. 1 For violin and Piano "Unconditioned"
- Sonata for Piano and Cello "The Roots"
- Sonata for Violin and Piano "The Roots"
- Cadenza for violin and bass
- Clouds for violin and piano
- Duet for cello and bass
- Hermanos for guitar and bass
- Sonata (Angels 1) for contralto sax and double bass
- Sonatina for bass and piano
- Grains for cello (viola) and piano
- Sea Song 1 Before the Sea for cello and piano
- Sea Song 4 Anamì for violin and piano
- Introduction a la Patagonie pour contrebasse et percussions
- Following (a Bird) for Violin or cello and Piano
- Sweet and sour for Violin and Piano

Trio

- Split, postcards from far away for piano trio and live electronics
- Rain, In your Black eyes
- Diversion for piano trio
- The Things That Remain for Piano Trio
- Trio N. 4, Three drawing about missed steps
- The life that i like for double bass, accordeon and piano
- ZeNo for cello, flute and vibraphon
- Round about for viola cello and double bass
- Piano Trio No. 1 "No Man's Land"
- Sunrise on a clear day
- Thunders and lightnings

String Quartets

- Quartet No. 1 (Medoro's death)
- Quartet No. 2 Quattordici danze per bambini intorno a un buco for string quartet
- Quartet No. 3 "The way of 1000 and 1 comet" String quartet (AKA Wine Trances)
- Quartet No. 4 "The four letters"
- Quartet No. 5 " Music For The Lodger"
- The sky seen from the moon String quartet
- The last black String quartet
- The Gibigianna String quartet
- Gagarin String quartet
- One way for string quartet
- I was born child... String quartet
- Who cares about the Bluebird tunes, For string quartet
- Merge, one harm hug for string quartet
- New York Suite for saxophone quartet
- Mmm! For double basse, piano, clarinet and percussions
- The woman photographer's game, for string quartet

Compositions for one instrument

- Sonata No. 1 in G minor (The 12th Room)
- Missing a Part (The Waiting Room G)
- Snow for solo piano
- Smiles for Y for Solo Piano
- Following (a bird) for Solo Piano
- Split, Postcards From Faraway For solo Piano
- Sweet and Bitter for Solo Piano
- Concerto for solo bass
- Mmdu (Humans) for solo bass
- Suite in B minor for solo cello
- Cadenza for solo cello
- Forgotten smiles for solo violin
- Colloqui con se stesso (solo Doublebass)
- AmOx For Solo Bass
- Introduction à la Patagonie for Solo Bass

Vocal music

- Cross, an Allelujah for voice and piano quintet
- Laudate for 4 sopranos
- A Lullaby from Shakespeare for choir
- Introduction à la Patagonie pour contrebasse et percussions
- Nine 9 stories about humans and love for voices, 6 cellos and keyboards (lyrics by Pete Smith and E. Bosso)
- Set a place for voice and piano quintet
- Sleep reconciliation for voice and string quartet
- You'll never be lee marvin for voice and string quartet
- Our multiple selves survive for voice and piano quintet
- Sleep reconciliation for voice and string quartet
- I'm not a swan for voice, cello and piano
- Off the handle for voice, violin and piano
- Emily real #15 for actress 2 keyboards and strings and electric guitar (from 15 poems by Emily Dickinson)
- Cappotto di legno (From a text by Roberto Saviano) for rapper, strings and El. bass
- Suite del Regreso for voice Solo
- Air on the first star of the night for soprano and piano trio
- Hommage a Demetrio for double bass and voice
- The Perfect Mood Maker - The Stage London

Other compositions

- 6 breaths for 6 (12) cellos and piano
- Sea Song 7 Deep seas for 3 viola 3 cello 2 double basses (8 cellos)
- Scherzo for 4 accordeons
- Fuga for percussions
- Mozart Human Variation for voices and tape
- Bach 855a for Piano, Choir and Strings

Ballets

- LandForms 2011 (Bonachela, Sydney Dance Company)
- 6 Breaths 2010 (Bonachela, Sydney Dance Company)
- We unfold 2009 (Bonachela, Sydney Dance Company)
- The Land Of Yes and The Land of No (Bonachela, BDC, Southbank)
- Within the Golden Hour 2008 (C. Wheeldon San Francisco Ballet)
- AmOx 2008 (R. Bonachela, Saddlers Wells)
- Riapertura 2007 (C. Wheeldon, Ballet Boyz, Royal Festival Hall)
- Tenderhook 2007 (L. Lorent - Scottish Dance theater)
- Moments 2006 (Ballet Boyz, Saddlers Wells)
- The body and the bass (T. Yap, Art council Melbourne) 1998
- The breath of the thramp (R. Castello, Danse scenen Copenaghen) 1997
- Traveller 1995 (T. M. Rotella, Teatro di Dioniso)
- 6 november 1994 (P. Bianchi Agar)
- Flautus 1994 (P. Bianchi Agar)
- Friendship Is a Root

Opera

- Alcina 1994
- Orlando 2002
- Simone e il mago 2000
- Mercuzio 1997
- Ezio Bosso's The Venice Concert, La Fenice Theatre

Theater

- Io non ho paura, quattordici danze per bambini, Salvatores - Bosso 2003
- Aspettiamo quello simpatico, R. Papaleo 2001
- Moi je s'addresse, C. Galland 2000
- Qoeleth e il cantico dei cantici, D. Riondino 1999
- La confessione biologica, A. Catania 1998
- Studio su amleto, V. Malosti 1997
- Sogno di una notte di mezza estate, V. Malosti 1996
- A score for Amleth, V. Malosti 1995
- Cuori, V. Malosti 1994
- La stanza di Emily V. Malosti 1994
- Agamemnon, R.Cuocolo 1995
- Nina, V. Malosti 1996
- Percorsi, V. Malosti 1992
- Genio buono vs Genio Cattivo, V. Malosti 1992
- Il mio Giudice, text by Maria Pia Daniele, director V Malosti 1993
- Studio per contrabbasso e ombre, E. Bosso 1995
- Amleth machine, E. Bosso 1992
- Watershakespear, V. Malosti 1991

Soundtracks

Movies

- Un amore, conducted by Gianluca Maria Tavarelli (1999)
- Qui non è il paradiso, conducted by Gianluca Maria Tavarelli (2000)
- Ribelli per caso, conducted by Vincenzo Terracciano (2001)
- Io non ho paura, conducted by Gabriele Salvatores (2003)
- Quo vadis, baby?, conducted by Gabriele Salvatores (2005)
- Rosso come il cielo, conducted by Cristiano Bortone (2005)
- Il dolce e l'amaro, conducted by Andrea Porporati (2007)
- Il ragazzo invisibile, conducted by Gabriele Salvatores (2014)

Short movies

- Tre vite perfette 2002
- L'ospite 2002
- Cecchi Gori Cecchi Gori 2001
- Svelarsi al silenzio 1989
- Will and Chance 1998
- Una casa poco solida 1995

Silent movies

- Voyage au Soleil 1995
- Voyage en Italie 1995
- 62 short movies of Méliès 1995
- Die tolle Lola 1996
- Le voyage dans la lune 1996
- The Man with the Camera 1996
- Ecrin du marajah 2004
- Il diavolo zoppo 2004
- Marriage dans la Lune 2004
- Tango Tangeles 2004
- Voyage sur Jupiter 2004
- The Lodger (1926 Alfred Hitchcock) 2006

== Discography ==
- Seasong 1 to 4 and other little stories (2011)
- Six breaths (2013)
- The 12th Room (2015)
- ...And The Things That Remain (2016)
- The Venice Concert (2016)
- Ezio Bosso Stradivarifestival Chamber Orchestra (2017)
- The Venice Concert (2017)
- The Roots (A Tale Sonata) (2018)
- A Life in Music (2020)
