= Doc – Nelle tue mani =

Italian television series

- Genre: Medical drama
- Created by: Francesco Arlanch; Viola Rispoli
- Starring: Luca Argentero; Matilde Gioli; Pierpaolo Spollon; Raffaele Esposito; Sara Lazzaro; Gianmarco Saurino; Simona Tabasco; Alberto Malanchino; Silvia Mazzieri; Beatrice Grannò; Elisa Di Eusanio; Giovanni Scifoni; Alice Arcuri; Marco Rossetti; Gaetano Bruno
- Composers: Tony Brundo; Nico Bruno
- Country of origin: Italy
- No. of seasons: 4
- No. of episodes: 54

Production
- Running time: 50–60 minutes
- Production companies: Rai Fiction; Lux Vide

Original release
- Network: Rai 1
- Release: 26 March 2020 – present

Doc – Nelle tue mani (in English, "Doc – In your hands"), titled Doc in the English translated versions, is an Italian medical drama TV series broadcast on Rai 1 since February 2020, written by Francesco Arlanch and Viola Rispoli.

The series is officially inspired by the true story of doctor Pierdante Piccioni, who was the former chief of the emergency room of Lodi and Codogno, who forgot the previous 12 years of his life following a car accident in 2013.

The set is the fictional Policlinico Ambrosiano hospital in Milan, and the plot concerns the doctors working in the internal medicine department.

Season 1 was directed by Jan Maria Michelini and Ciro Visco, while season 2's directors were Beniamino Catena and Giacomo Martelli.

All four seasons aired on Australian TV channel SBS Television's streaming service SBS on Demand, titled Doc.

An American adaptation, Doc, has been airing on Fox, with Fox Entertainment Studios, Sony Pictures Television and 3 Arts Entertainment producing, starting on January 7, 2025.

A Greek adaptation of the series, with the name Ο Γιατρός (O Giatrós, "The Doc"), was aired on Alpha TV, starting on September 30, 2023 and was ended on May 22, 2026.

A Mexican adaptation of the series, titled Doc, aired on Netflix on 4 March 2026.

An Indian Hindi-language adaptation of the series, titled Hui Gumm Yaadein Ek Doctor, Do Zindagiyaan, aired on Sony SAB on 6 April 2026.

== Plot ==
=== Season 1 ===
Professor Andrea Fanti is a well-known and popular doctor working at the Policlinico Ambrosiano hospital of Milan, where he is the chief of the internal medicine department. Despite his achievements, he is undeniably arrogant, narcissistic, and a rigid micromanager. Fanti believes that patients are often dishonest, leading him to handle those in his care with an oppressive and at times harsh approach. He places his trust solely in the carefully chosen members of his team, particularly his assistant, Giulia Giordano, a fellow doctor with whom he maintains a clandestine relationship.

One day, the father of Giovanni Pavesi, a young boy who died in Fanti's ward following a mistake (he was given the wrong medicine due to a homonymy error), waits for Fanti to end his shift at the hospital and shoots him in the head. Though the doctor does not die, he suffers from an irreversible prefrontal trauma, which causes him to forget the previous 12 years. Indeed, when Fanti wakes up from the coma, he believes that it is June 2008 instead of 2020 and his last memory is him coming home after signing his first contract with the Policlinico Ambrosiano. Forgetting most of the staff he used to work with, Fanti becomes a kinder and more thoughtful man instead of the authoritarian doctor he once was.

Thrown into a present he sometimes struggles to understand, obliged to start over most of his life and to deal with relevant trauma like his child's death and the separation from his wife (which he forgot), he perceives his loved ones as strangers. As a consequence, the hospital becomes the only place where Andrea feels really at home and where he can try to build a new private and working future.

No longer able to be the chief of the department of which he used to be in charge, he comes back to work as a "doctor with limitations", that is a kind of assistant for young residents, who nickname him "Doc", and uses empathy to interact with patients and help solve their medical issues. In the meantime, he starts a psychological journey with Sardoni, a longtime friend and colleague of his.

=== Season 2 ===
Set in an unspecified future, COVID-19 critical stage has ended and the Policlinico Ambrosiano comes back to normal activity.

Several flashbacks allow us to understand what happened during the acute phase of the COVID-19 pandemic in Italy. Many wards were converted to face the emergency, including the internal medicine department. However, the hospital had limited resources and people to cope with thousands of patients in a very short time, so, once the emergency ends, the high number of dead doctors and patients leads to an investigation by both the Italian Magistrates' court and the hospital itself, involving all the medical staff, medical director Agnese Tiberi, Andrea Fanti and his team.

Among the victims of COVID-19, there is Lorenzo Lazzarini, a member of Fanti's team later identified as the patient zero, the one who unintentionally introduced the virus in the Policlinico: only his colleagues know the truth about him being the index case and they keep the secret to honour his memory. However, his death, which occurred under unclear circumstances, is also a matter of investigation.

In the meantime, Agnese is suspended from her role as director due to the investigation about the department he managed during the pandemic and starts working as a senior doctor in the ward she used to belong to, which doctor Sandri manages. The lawyer Caruso, also chief of the administrative department, is appointed as the new medical director with the aim of finding out the truth about how the doctors tackled the pandemic emergency.

At the same time, doctor Cecilia Tedeschi, famous virologist and scholar of infectious diseases, is appointed as chief of the internal medicine department, a vacant role after the imprisonment of professor Sardoni and temporarily held by doctor Giordano during the pandemic. Tedeschi is also a former Agnese and Andrea's university mate and was once in love with Andrea, who did not reciprocate her feelings.

Tedeschi secretly wants to turn the internal medicine department into an infectious diseases department with Caruso's help.

Trying to save his department, keep his team united and protect everyone from the investigation, Andrea decides to get his role as chief of the department back, facing several exams intended to certify his eligibility. While doing so, Andrea also needs to deal with Caruso, who does not want him to manage that department for some unknown reasons.

=== Season 3 ===
2023. Andrea is back as chief of the internal medicine department and must once again manage its responsibilities, including training new residents. Furthermore, the new administrative director pressures him to reduce the department's costs and increase efficiency. In the meantime, Agnese accepts the role of health director again. While going through a crisis phase with her partner, she often meets with Professor Bramante, her and Andrea's former Medicine teacher, with whom she seems to have a dark secret in common.

In this season, Andrea's memories partially resurface, albeit fragmented and often not authentic, as his unconscious created them. Enrico and Giulia will again be at his side in his quest to reconstruct the events. However, the latter is engaged in scientific research to become the department chief in another hospital.

== Cast and characters ==
=== Main ===
- Luca Argentero as Dr. Andrea Fanti
- Matilde Gioli as Dr. Giulia Giordano
- Pierpaolo Spollon as Dr. Riccardo Bonvenga
- Raffaele Esposito as Dr. Marco Sardoni (season 1)
- Sara Lazzaro as Dr. Agnese Tiberi
- Gianmarco Saurino as Dr. Lorenzo Lazzarini (season 1; recurring season 2)
- Simona Tabasco as Dr. Elisa Russo
- Alberto Malanchino as Dr. Gabriel Kidane
- Silvia Mazzieri as Dr. Alba Patrizi (season 1-2)
- Beatrice Grannò as Carolina Fanti
- Elisa Di Eusanio as Nurse Teresa Maraldi
- Giovanni Scifoni as Dr. Enrico Sandri
- Alice Arcuri as Dr. Cecilia Tedeschi (season 2-present)
- Marco Rossetti as Dr. Damiano Cesconi (season 2-present)
- Gaetano Bruno as Dr. Edoardo Valenti (season 2-present)
- Laura Cravedi as Dr. Martina Carelli (season 3-present)
- Giacomo Giorgio as Dr. Federico Lentini (season 3-present)
- Elisa Wong as Dr. Lin Wang (season 3-present)

=== Recurring ===
- Simone Gandolfo as Davide
- Mariarosa Russo as Irene Ceraldo (season 1)
- Pia Lanciotti as Dr. Fabrizia Martelli (season 1-2)
- Giusy Buscemi as Dr. Lucia Ferrari (season 2)
- Massimo Rigo as Umberto Caruso (season 2)
- Lorenzo Frediani as Father Massimo (season 2)
- Arianna Scommegna as Dr. Marrabini (season 3)
- Aurora Peres as Barbara (season 3)

=== Guest stars ===
- Valeria Fabrizi as Tilde Ravelli
- Fiammetta Cicogna as Vittoria
- Alberto Molinari as Edoardo Grotti
- Ilaria Spada as Serena Ruffo
- Giacomo Poretti as Giacomo

== Episodes ==
Series	Episodes	Originally released	
Series	Episodes	First released	Last released
1	16	26 March 2020	19 November 2020
2	16	13 January 2022	17 March 2022
3	16	11 January 2024	7 March 2024
4	TBA	1 October 2026	TBA

=== Season 1 (2020) ===
No. overall	No. in season	Title	Directed by	Written by	Original release date
1	1	"Amnesia"	Jan Michelini	Francesco Arlanch	26 March 2020
2	2	"Selfie"	Jan Michelini	Francesco Arlanch	26 March 2020
3	3	"Niente di personale"	Jan Michelini	Viola Rispoli	2 April 2020
4	4	"Una cosa buona che fa male"	Jan Michelini	Viola Rispoli	2 April 2020
5	5	"L'errore"	Jan Michelini	Francesco Arlanch	9 April 2020
6	6	"Come eravamo"	Jan Michelini	Viola Rispoli	9 April 2020
7	7	"Like"	Jan Michelini	Francesco Arlanch & Francesco Balletta	16 April 2020
8	8	"Il giuramento di Ippocrate"	Jan Michelini	Valerio D'Annunzio & Francesco Arlanch	16 April 2020
9	9	"In salute e in malattia"	Ciro Visco	Francesco Arlanch & Francesco Balletta	15 October 2020
10	10	"Quello che siamo"	Ciro Visco	Francesco Arlanch	15 October 2020
11	11	"Cause ed effetti"	Ciro Visco	Lea Tafuri & Viola Rispoli	22 October 2020
12	12	"L'imprevisto"	Ciro Visco	Valerio D'Annunzio & Francesco Arlanch	22 October 2020
13	13	"Egoismi"	Ciro Visco	Viola Rispoli	29 October 2020
14	14	"Perdonare e perdonarsi"	Ciro Visco	Viola Rispoli & Gaia Rispoli	5 November 2020
15	15	"Veleni"	Ciro Visco	Francesco Arlanch	12 November 2020
16	16	"Io ci sono"	Ciro Visco	Francesco Arlanch	19 November 2020

=== Season 2 (2022) ===
No. overall	No. in season	Title	Directed by	Written by	Original release date
17	1	"Una vita nuova"	Beniamino Catena	Francesco Arlanch	13 January 2022
18	2	"La guerra è finita"	Beniamino Catena	Francesco Arlanch	13 January 2022
19	3	"Sfide"	Beniamino Catena	Viola Rispoli	20 January 2022
20	4	"Quello che sei"	Beniamino Catena	Silvia Leuzzi & Viola Rispoli	20 January 2022
21	5	"L'attenzione"	Beniamino Catena	Francesco Arlanch	27 January 2022
22	6	"Il gusto di vivere"	Beniamino Catena	Francesco Arlanch & Francesco Balletta	27 January 2022
23	7	"Fare una scelta"	Beniamino Catena	Francesco Arlanch & Fabrizio Madulla	10 February 2022
24	8	"Cane blu"	Beniamino Catena	Viola Rispoli	10 February 2022
25	9	"Streghe"	Giacomo Martelli	Francesco Arlanch & Francesco Balletta	17 February 2022
26	10	"Padri"	Giacomo Martelli	Gaia Rispoli & Paolo Piccirillo	17 February 2022
27	11	"Ragioni e conseguenze"	Giacomo Martelli	Viola Rispoli	3 March 2022
28	12	"Gold standard"	Giacomo Martelli	Francesco Arlanch	3 March 2022
29	13	"Così lontani, così vicini"	Giacomo Martelli	Francesco Arlanch & Francesco Balletta	10 March 2022
30	14	"Senza nome"	Giacomo Martelli	Francesco Arlanch, Ivano Fachin & Giovanni Galassi	10 March 2022
31	15	"Stigma"	Giacomo Martelli	Viola Rispoli	17 March 2022
32	16	"Mutazioni"	Giacomo Martelli	Francesco Arlanch	17 March 2022

=== Season 3 (2024) ===
No. overall	No. in season	Title	Directed by	Written by	Original release date
33	1	"Risvegli"	Jan Maria Michelini	Francesco Arlanch	11 January 2024
34	2	"Lasciar andare"	Jan Maria Michelini	Viola Rispoli	11 January 2024
35	3	"Perfetta"	Jan Maria Michelini	Francesco Arlanch & Silvia Leuzzi	18 January 2024
36	4	"Sogni"	Jan Maria Michelini	Edoardo A. Gino	18 January 2024
37	5	"Il beneficio del dubbio"	Nicola Abbatangelo	Francesco Arlanch	25 January 2024
38	6	"La vela"	Nicola Abbatangelo	Viola Rispoli	25 January 2024
39	7	"Fantasmi"	Nicola Abbatangelo	Umberto Gnoli	1 February 2024
40	8	"Salto nel buio"	Nicola Abbatangelo	Francesco Arlanch & Francesco Balletta	1 February 2024
41	9	"Evitarsi"	Nicola Abbatangelo	Francesco Arlanch, Gaia Rispoli & Paolo Piccirillo	15 February 2024
42	10	"Il fattore umano"	Nicola Abbatangelo	Francesco Arlanch & Silvia Leuzzi	15 February 2024
43	11	"Lontani"	Matteo Oleotto	Viola Rispoli	22 February 2024
44	12	"La scossa"	Matteo Oleotto	Francesco Arlanch	22 February 2024
45	13	"Legàmi"	Matteo Oleotto	Francesco Arlanch & Francesco Balletta	29 February 2024
46	14	"Vivere"	Matteo Oleotto	Edoardo A. Gino & Viola Rispoli	29 February 2024
47	15	"Quello che si deve fare"	Matteo Oleotto	Viola Rispoli	7 March 2024
48	16	"Liberi"	Matteo Oleotto	Francesco Arlanch	7 March 2024

=== Season 4 (2026) ===
No. overall	No. in season	Title	Directed by	Written by	Original release date
49	1	"Tutto scorre"	Nicola Abbatangelo	Francesco Arlanch & Viola Rispoli	1 October 2026
50	2	"Qui e ora"	Unknown	Unknown	1 October 2026
51	3	"Coordinazione"	Unknown	Unknown	8 October 2026
52	4	"Maledetto lunedì"	Unknown	Unknown	8 October 2026
53	5	"Samaritani"	Unknown	Unknown	15 October 2026
54	6	"Era mio padre"	Unknown	Unknown	15 October 2026
55	7	"Mostri"	TBA	TBA	22 October 2026
56	8	"Pinocchio"	TBA	TBA	22 October 2026

== Adaptations ==
Country	Local title	Network	Original release
Czech Republic	Chlap	TV Nova	13 March 2022 – 23 June 2022
Russia	Doktor Krasnov	Russia-1	24 August 2023 – present
Greece	Ο Γιατρός	Alpha Channel	1 October 2023 – present
India	Hui Gumm Yaadein – Ek Doctor, Do Zindagiyaan	Sony SAB	6 April 2026 – present
United States	Doc	Fox	7 January 2025 – present
Mexico	Doc	Netflix	4 March 2026 – 27 March 2026
Turkey	Doctor: In Another Life	Now	8 March 2026 – present
