= Barzini =

Barzini is a surname.

== People ==
Notable people with the surname include:

- Benedetta Barzini (born 1943), Italian actress and model
- Luigi Barzini, Sr. (1874–1947), Italian journalist, war correspondent and writer
- Luigi Barzini, Jr. (1908–1984), Italian journalist
- Matteo Barzini (born 1981), Italian filmmaker and producer

== Fictional characters ==
- Emilio Barzini, a fictional character and the main antagonist in Mario Puzo's novel The Godfather and its film adaptation
