= Luigi Barzini =

Luigi Barzini is the name of:

- Luigi Barzini, Sr. (1874–1947), Italian journalist, war correspondent and writer
- Luigi Barzini, Jr. (1908–1984), Italian journalist
