= London to Peking Motor Challenge =

The London to Peking Motor Challenge was a one-time car rally organized by the Jules Verne Society in the Spring of 1990.

As the name implied, the rally consisted of a drive from London, UK to Peking, China. Peking is now officially known as Beijing, but the old name was used, as the rally traced the course driven by the Italians Prince Scipione Borghese, mechanic Ettore Guizzardi and journalist Luigi Barzini in the Peking to Paris race in 1907 (before the name change). The 1990 rally ran in the opposite direction as the 1907 course, heading west-to-east.

== Origins ==
In March 1907, the Parisian newspaper Le Matin issued a challenge for anyone to drive from Peking to Paris by motor-car. Five teams; four French, and one Italian took up the challenge. Thus began the first, and most famous international car rally in early motoring history.

Barzini had written a popular book about his adventure, being the first to arrive in Paris, but a decade later, the Soviet Union closed off the route used by Barzini. With the glasnost and perestroika of the final days of the Soviet Union, the time seemed right for a new journey.

== 1990 ==
The 1990 course went from west-to-east along a different course than Barzini and his team took in 1907.

Starting at Marble Arch in London, the drivers were given a sendoff by Luigi Barzini's grandson. The drivers headed across the Channel on the P&O Ferry to France. From there, the drivers could take any course they chose across Europe before reuniting in Istanbul, Turkey. Afterward, the route ran across Turkey to the border with the Soviet Union in present-day Georgia, becoming the first time in Soviet history that western civilians were permitted to drive their own vehicles into the country. A ferry across the Caspian Sea took the drivers to present day Turkmenistan, Uzbekistan, and Kyrgyzstan, before entering China, crossing the Gobi Desert and arriving in Beijing on June 4, 1990, coincidentally the first anniversary of the crackdown on demonstrators in Tian'anmen Square.

The 1907 event was not intended to be a race or competition, but quickly became one due to the pioneering nature of it and the technical superiority of the Italians' car, a 40-HP Itala. The 1990 event was a goodwill tour, and no drivers were in competition.

Among the entrants in 1990, were vintage and antique vehicles, several motorcycles with and without sidecars, and modern four wheel drive vehicles, and amazingly all but one of the over 20 teams completed the journey. A 60-minute highlights broadcast was hosted and narrated by actor Cliff Robertson and shown on ESPN in the United States.

== Legacy ==
- In 1908 another transcontinental race was held, running from Times Square in New York City west to Paris.
- With the opening of the borders in both the former Soviet Union and China, transcontinental rallies are feasible once again, though rarely attempted due to the costs and time involved. One such event has been run, a 1997 motor rally that roughly duplicated the 1908 course. (Website offline, archived at Internet Archive)
- The Great Race, an American club rally competition for antique automobiles planned a world wide race for 1992 but later shelved the idea.
- The American reality television series The Amazing Race documents teams attempting to circumnavigate the entire globe, using various means of travel including automobiles.
- LTV Corporation, manufacturers of the US military Humvee used the 1990 London to Peking Motor Challenge to test out two matching prototypes of a civilian version of the vehicle. Passing the test with ease, and stopping along the way to perform stunts for local villagers, the vehicles would later enter production (after even greater media exposure in Operation Desert Storm) as the Hummer H1.
- The Mongol Rally started in 2004 and now 200 cars race to Mongolia each year. The cars cannot get all the way to Beijing due to car import tax restrictions, but many participants carry to China from Ulaan Baator on the Trans-Mongolian Express.
