= Scusa ma ti chiamo amore =

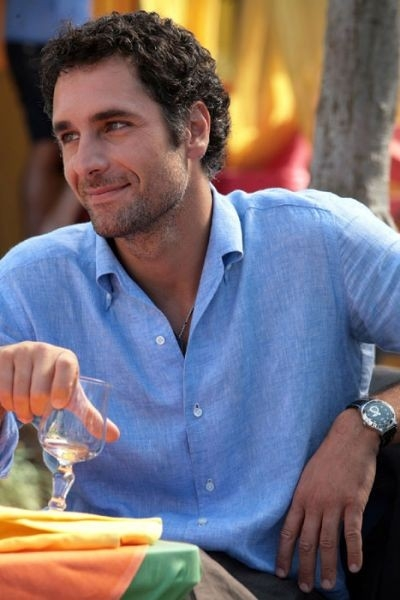
- Raoul Bova in a film scene
- Directed by: Federico Moccia
- Written by: Federico Moccia; Luca Infascelli; Chiara Barzini
- Story by: Federico Moccia (novel)
- Produced by: Rita Cecchi Gori; Vittorio Cecchi Gori
- Starring: Raoul Bova; Michela Quattrociocche
- Cinematography: Marcello Montarsi
- Edited by: Patrizio Marone
- Music by: Claudio Guidetti
- Distributed by: Cecchi Gori Group, Medusa Film
- Release date: 2008
- Running time: 108 minutes
- Country: Italy
- Language: Italian

Sorry but I call you love (Italian: Scusa ma ti chiamo amore) is a 2008 Italian romantic comedy film directed by Federico Moccia and starring Raoul Bova and Michela Quattrociocche. A cinematic adaptation of the Italian novel Scusa ma ti chiamo amore is published by the movie director.

The film was released on the Italian cinema circuit on 25 January 2008.

== Plot ==
Niki is a seventeen-year-old girl in her last year of high school who spends her free time with her trusted group of friends, the O.N.D.E. (waves) a name created from the first letters of each of their names: Olimpia (Olly), Nicoletta (Niki), Diletta and Erica. Alex is almost thirty-seven and a career publicist who is struggling with the loss of his longtime girlfriend, Elena, who recently left him. One morning, Niki and Alex crash into each other while commuting. After giving her a ride to school, Alex gives Niki his contact information for any repairs needed for her moped, which soon becomes the means by which their romance blossoms.

Diletta meets a guy at school and they quickly develop feelings for each other. Soon after making plans with him, Diletta gets into a tragic car accident that leaves her in a coma for weeks. Olly, Niki, and Erica spend their time with her in the hospital, singing and playing her songs and reviewing for la maturità, the final exam at the end of Italian high school. While Niki reviews for the test, Diletta wakes up and the girls celebrate.

Elena returns and Alex leaves Niki for his old life, but soon realizes that he is no longer in love with the woman he is supposed to be with, nor with the job he is supposed to be glad to have. Alex finds that Elena had been sleeping with the man with whom he had been competing for the "La Luna" advertisement bid and kicks her out. He then rejects his new promotion and work and quits, buying a house on an island and leaving a note for Niki to join him there. They reunite and live happily ever after.

== Cast ==
- Raoul Bova: Alessandro Belli
- Michela Quattrociocche: Niki
- Veronika Logan: Elena
- Luca Angeletti: Enrico
- Ignazio Oliva: Flavio
- Lorenzo Federici: Matteo

== Sequel ==
A sequel entitled Scusa ma ti voglio sposare was released in 2010, with the cast from the first film reprising their roles.
