= Peking to Paris =

Former automobile race

The Peking to Paris motor race was an automobile race, originally held in 1907, between Peking (now Beijing), then Qing China (now the People's Republic of China) and Paris, France (then the Third French Republic), a distance of 14,994 kilometres (9,317 mi).

The idea for the race came from a challenge published in the Paris newspaper Le Matin on 31 January 1907, reading:

"What needs to be proved today is that as long as a man has a car, he can do anything and go anywhere. Is there anyone who will undertake to travel this summer from Paris to Peking by automobile?"

Eventually the race started from the French embassy in Peking on 10 June 1907. The winner, Prince Scipione Borghese, arrived in Paris on 10 August 1907.

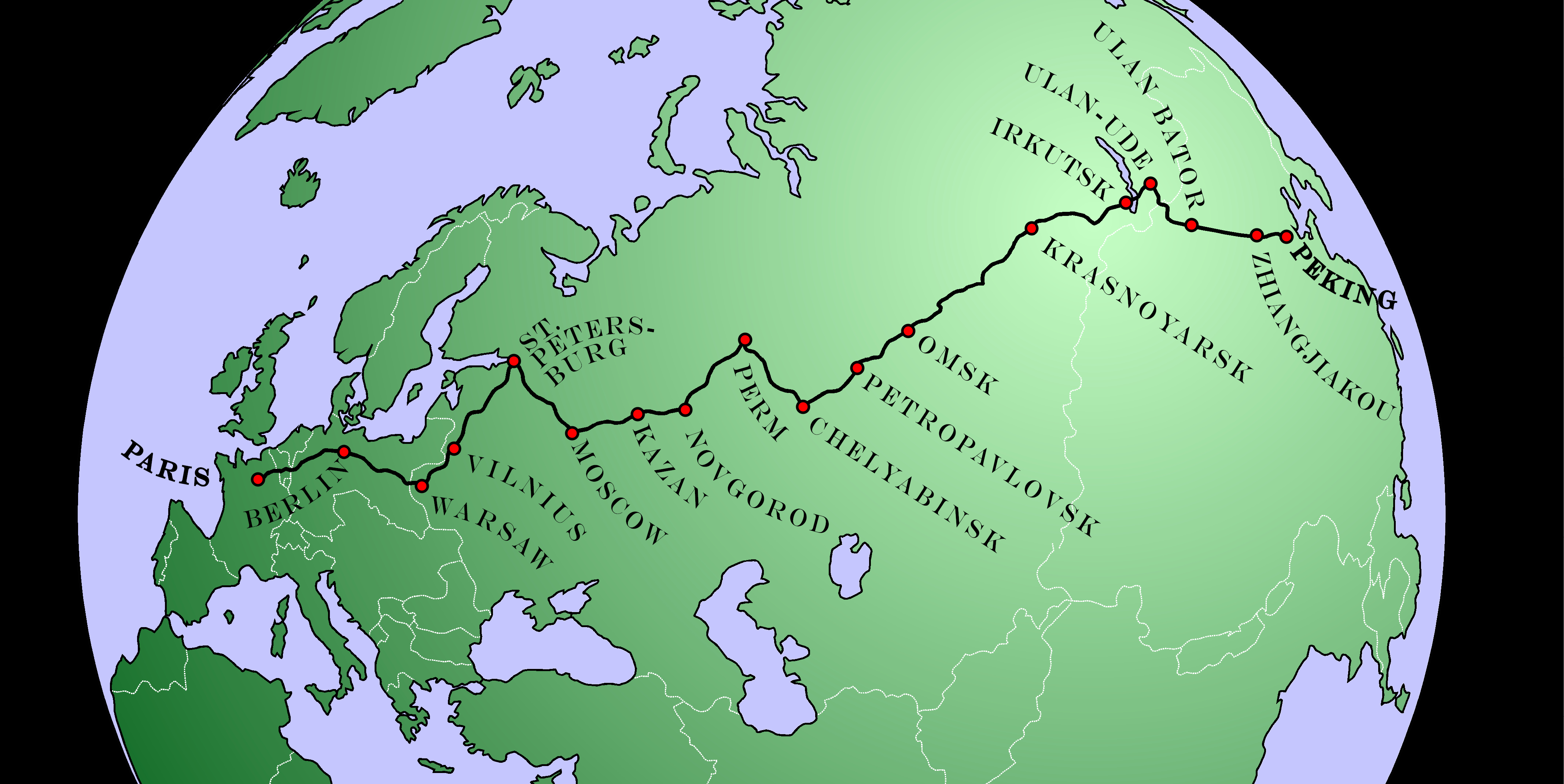
Map of the route of the 1907 Peking to Paris race.

== 1907 teams ==
There were forty entrants in the race, but only five teams ended up going ahead with shipping the cars to Peking. The race was held despite the race committee cancelling the race.

- Itala, (Italy) Italian, 7 litre engine, finished 1st, driven by Prince Scipione Borghese and Ettore Guizzardi
- Spyker, (Netherlands) Dutch, finished 2nd, driven by Charles Godard with Jean du Taillis
- Contal, (France) French, did not finish, three-wheeler Cyclecar, driven by Auguste Pons
- DeDion 1, (France) French, finished 3rd, driven by Georges Cormier
- DeDion 2, (France) French, finished 4th, driven by Victor Collignon

== The 1907 race ==
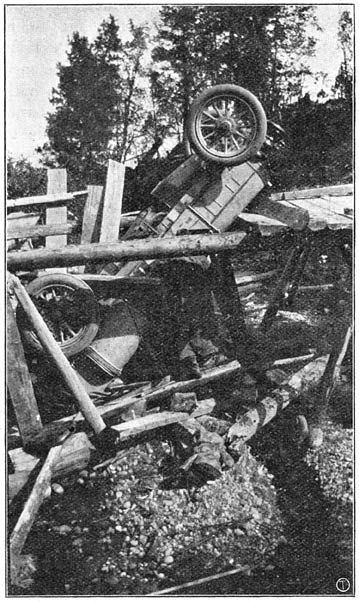
Hazards of the road: Borghese & Barzini's Itala having fallen through a bridge

There were no rules in the race, except that the first car to Paris would win the prize of a magnum of Mumm champagne. The race went without any assistance through countryside where there were no roads or roadmaps. For the race, camels carrying fuel left Peking and set up at stations along the route, to provide fuel for the racers. The race followed a telegraph route, so that the race was well covered in newspapers at the time. Each car had one journalist as a passenger, with the journalists sending stories from the telegraph stations regularly throughout the race.

The race was held during a time when cars were fairly new and the route traversed remote areas of Asia where people were not yet familiar with motor travel. The route between Peking and Lake Baikal had only previously been attempted on horseback. The race was won by Italian Prince Scipione Borghese of the Borghese family (although his chauffeur Ettore Guizzardi apparently did most of the driving), accompanied by the journalist Luigi Barzini Sr. He was confident and had even taken a detour from Moscow to St Petersburg for a dinner which was held for the team, and afterwards headed back to Moscow and rejoined the race. The event was not intended to be a race or competition, but quickly became one due to its pioneering nature and the technical superiority of the Italians' car, a 7,433 cc (453.6 cu in) Itala 35/45 HP.

Second in the race was Charles Godard in the Spyker; he had no money, had to ask others for petrol, and borrowed his car for the race. He was arrested for fraud near the end of the race. Some of the other cars had difficulties in going up ravines, across mud, quicksand, and bridges across rivers not designed for vehicles. The Contal cyclecar became bogged down in the Gobi Desert and was not recovered, with the crew lucky to be found alive by locals. Barzini published the book Peking to Paris in 1908, filled with hundreds of pictures.

== Re-enactments ==
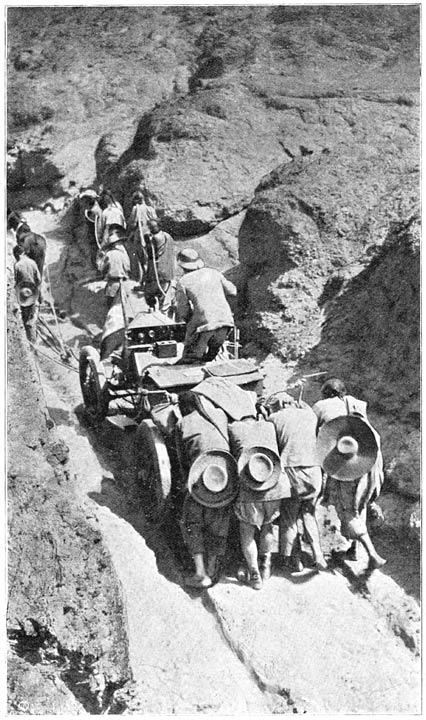
The Itala being pulled across unnavigable terrain

Several races have been held to re-enact the event, including the Great Auto Race of 1908 which raced from New York, west to Paris (by sea for part of the way). During most of the twentieth century, other re-enactments could not be held, because of the establishment of the USSR after the 1917 Russian Revolution. After the dissolution of the Soviet Union in the early 1990s, racers were again allowed to race.

=== 1990 ===
In 1990 the London To Peking Motor Challenge was held, which raced in the opposite direction to the original race, from London to Beijing.

=== 1997 ===
In 1997 there was "The Second Peking to Paris Motor Challenge", consisting of 94 vintage cars, which took a more southerly route through Tibet, India, Pakistan, Iran, Turkey, Greece, and Italy. It was won by the British pair Phil Surtees and John Bayliss, driving a 1942 Willys Jeep.

=== 2005 ===
On 18 April 2005 a 1973 Fiat 500 made it from Bari, Italy, to Beijing in a 16,000-kilometre (9,900 mi) journey across the whole of Russia and passing through Vladivostok. The route was partially similar to the original one. Driven for 100 days by Danilo Elia and Fabrizio Bonserio, the old and tiny car was followed along its journey by newspapers and television from all over the world. After the long journey, Elia wrote a book entitled La bizzarra impresa (ISBN 88-7480-088-6), in Italian, also available in German by the National Geographic Deutschland (Echt Abgefahren, ISBN 978-3-89405-834-0).

On 15 May 2005 five cars led by Lang Kidby departed Beijing for Paris, retracing the original route with very similar cars to the originals; a 1907 Spyker, a 1907 and a 1912 De Dion-Bouton, a 1907 Itala, and a Contal Cycle-car replica. This journey was televised by the Australian Broadcasting Corporation in a four-part documentary series entitled Peking to Paris. The show was hosted by Warren Brown, one of two drivers on the Itala and a cartoonist with Sydney newspaper The Daily Telegraph. The Australian team, driving westward, met the Italian Fiat 500, driving eastward, in an unplanned meeting, somewhere around Krasnojarsk, Russia.

=== 2007 ===
In 2007 the Endurance Rally Association staged a rally to celebrate the centenary of the original 1907 race. Unlike the 1997 event, also staged by Philip Young, which took a southerly route, this event followed more faithfully the route taken by Prince Borghese in 1907 in the winning Itala. From Beijing, competitors went north to the Mongolian border at Zamyn-Üüd and, as with his original route, north to Ulaanbaatar. The route then went west across Mongolia, crossing the Russian border at Tsagaannuur through Siberia to Moscow, on to St Petersburg (where Prince Borghese attended "a great banqet") and then through the Baltic states to finish in Paris. 126 veteran, vintage, and classic cars took part, the oldest being a 1903 Mercedes Simplex 60HP. The major challenge of the rally proved to be Mongolia and the Gobi Desert with no conventional roads, merely rutted tracks at best. Despite this 106 crossed the finishing line. The rally covered 12642 km in 36 days.

=== 2013 ===
The fifth race started at Beijing on 28 May 2013. It was for vintage cars and was to last 33 days. In the third week, the race was marred by the death of a British participant, 46-year-old Emma Wilkinson, in a head-on collision with a vehicle unconnected with the event.

== Legacy ==
In 1960, the Italian film producer Dino De Laurentiis intended to compose a film about the historic race starring Golden Globe winning American actor Earl Holliman, who was living in Paris at the time, to appear in one of the leading roles. However, it never materialized.

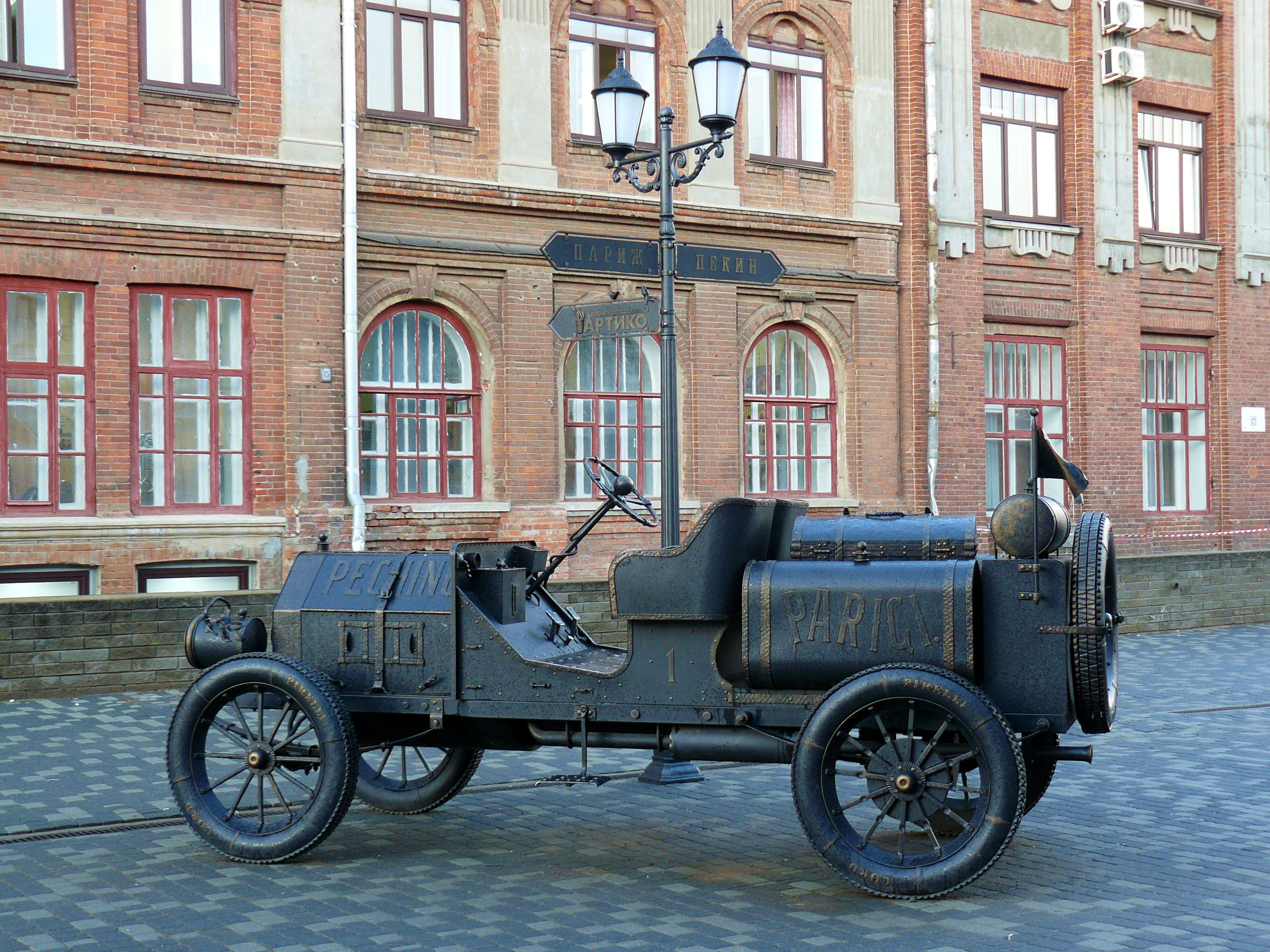
The sculpture of Borghese's Itala in Kirov, Russia

In 2015, commissioned by Pirelli Kirov Tyre Plant, a monument to the Borghese's Itala was erected in Kirov, Russia. The monument commemorates the fact of Borghese's team making a stopover in Vyatka Governorate. The monument was created by the designer Elena Gurina and the blacksmith Eduard Gurin.

== See also ==
- Endurance racing (motorsport)

== Bibliography ==
- Barzini, Luigi (1907). Pekin to Paris: an account of Prince Borgheseʹs journey across two continents in a motor-car. Translated by de Castelvecchio, L. P. London: E. Grant Richards.
- The Mad Motorists- The Great Peking to Paris Race of '07 by Allen Andrews (1965) J B Lippincott Co. ASIN: B0006BLYX0
- Peking to Paris - The Ultimate Driving Adventure - Veloce Publishing
- The Great Peking to Paris Expedition - Harper Collins - 2005 ISBN 0-7322-8253-5
- Due mondi visti da un'Alfa - Nada editore
- Kassia St Clair: The Race to the Future: The Adventure that Accelerated the Twentieth Century, John Murray, 2023, ISBN 978-1-52938606-6
