= Sorry If I Want to Marry You =

- Film poster
- Italian: Scusa se ti voglio sposare
- Directed by: Federico Moccia
- Written by: Chiara Barzini, Federico Moccia
- Starring: Raoul Bova; Michela Quattrociocche; Andrea Montovoli
- Release date: 12 February 2010
- Running time: 106 minutes
- Country: Italy
- Language: Italian

Sorry If I Want to Marry You (Italian: Scusa ma ti voglio sposare) is a 2010 Italian romantic comedy film directed by Federico Moccia.

It is the sequel to the film Sorry but I call you love and is portrayed by Raoul Bova and Michela Quattrociocche with the original music by Emanuele Bossi and the Zero Assoluto.

== Cast ==
- Raoul Bova - Alessandro 'Alex' Belli
- Michela Quattrociocche - Niki
- Andrea Montovoli - Guido
- Francesco Apolloni - Pietro
- Luca Angeletti - Enrico
- Cecilia Dazzi - Simona
- Ignazio Oliva - Flavio
- Francesco Arca - photographer
- Francesca Ferrazzo - Erica
- Francesca Antonelli - Susanna
- Michelle Carpente - Diletta
