= Raoul Bova =

Italian actor (born 1971)

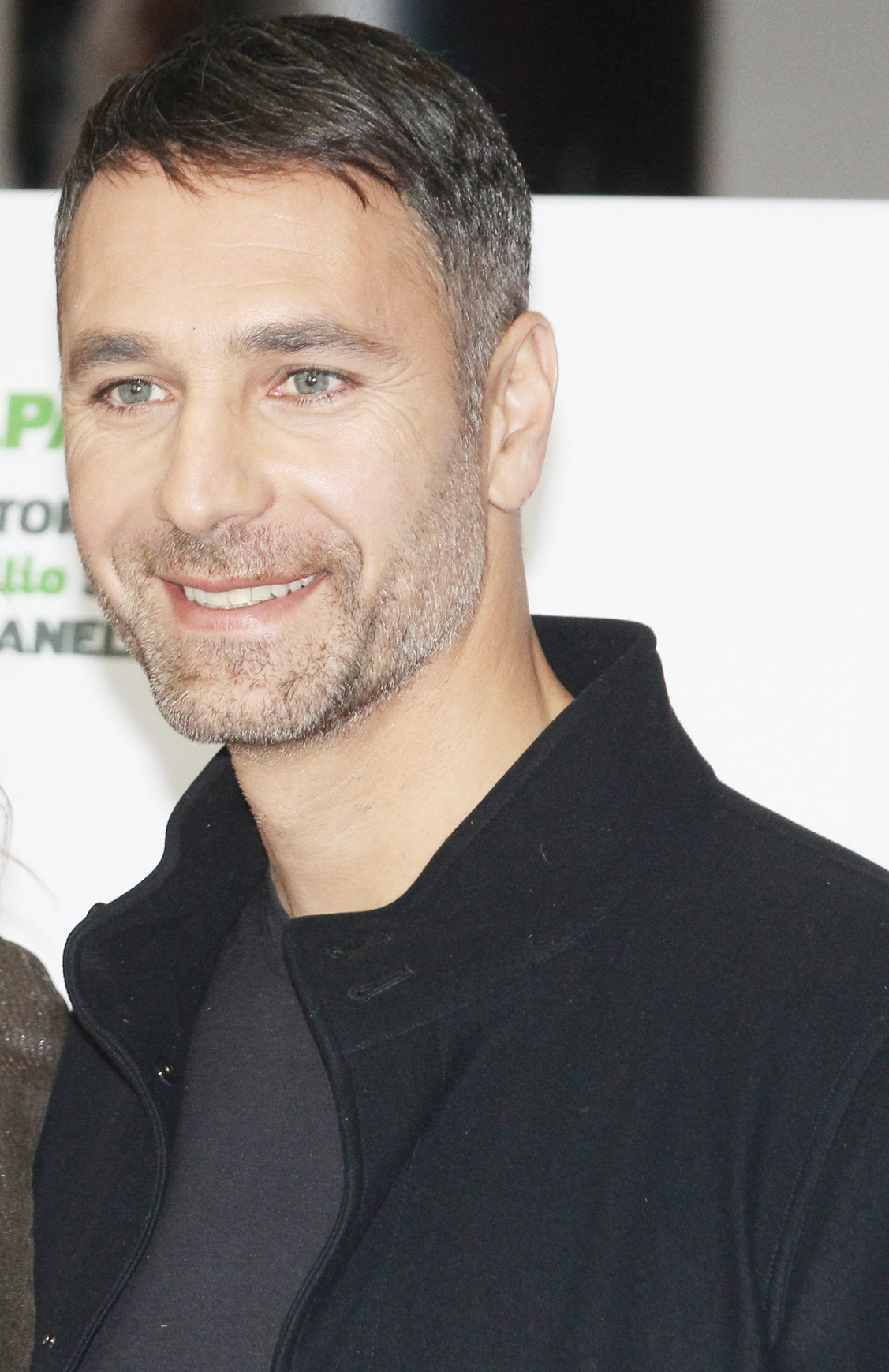
- Bova during the promotion of Ever Been to the Moon? (2015)
- Born: 14 August 1971 (age 54); Rome, Italy
- Occupation: Actor
- Years active: 1984–present
- Spouse: Chiara Giordano (m. 2000; div. 2013)
- Partner: Rocío Muñoz Morales (2013-2025)
- Children: 4

Raoul Bova (Italian pronunciation: [ˈraul ˈbɔːva]; born 14 August 1971) is an Italian actor. Bova's European film breakthrough was in the 1993 film Piccolo grande amore, and he's played romantic male leads in the following years. His American film credits include Under the Tuscan Sun (2003), Alien vs. Predator (2004) and The Tourist (2010).

== Life and career ==
Bova was born in Rome to a father from Roccella Ionica in Calabria and a mother from Acerra in Campania. At the age of 16, Bova became a local champion in the 100-metre backstroke. At the age of 21 he joined the Italian Army and performed his military duty in the Bersaglieri (sharpshooters) corps. He enrolled in the ISEF, the Italian Institute of Physical Education, but dropped out to pursue a career in acting. He studied at the school of Beatrice Bracco in Rome and also studied acting with Michael Margotta.

After making his Italian television debut, Bova starred as a hunky watersports instructor in the 1993 romantic comedy film Pretty Princess. The following years, Bova played many leading roles in Italian romantic films. In 2002, he made his American film debut, appearing in the crime comedy Avenging Angelo. The following year, Bova played Diane Lane's love interest in the comedy-drama film Under the Tuscan Sun. In 2004, he co-starred opposite Sanaa Lathan in the science fiction film Alien vs. Predator. His other notable American film credits include The Tourist (2010), and All Roads Lead to Rome opposite Sarah Jessica Parker.

On television, Bova had a recurring role in the ABC comedy-drama What About Brian from 2006 to 2007, and in 2018 starred as Pope Sixtus IV in the British-Italian period drama Medici. In 2019, he starred opposite Kate del Castillo in the Telemundo/Netflix crime drama series La Reina del Sur.

== Personal life ==
In March 2000, he married Chiara Giordano. In 2013, Bova and Giordano separated. That same year, he started dating actress Rocío Muñoz Morales, after the two had met on the film set of Immaturi – Il viaggio (2012). They had their first child in December 2015, the same month their film All Roads Lead to Rome was released.

On 15 October 2010, Bova was nominated Goodwill Ambassador of the Food and Agriculture Organization of the United Nations (FAO).

Bova is Roman Catholic.

== In the Media ==
Bova is known as one of Italy's handsomest men. He was dubbed "Sexiest Actor Alive" by Glamour Magazine. He was ranked #13 in the "World's Sexiest Men" list in 2008.

== Filmography ==
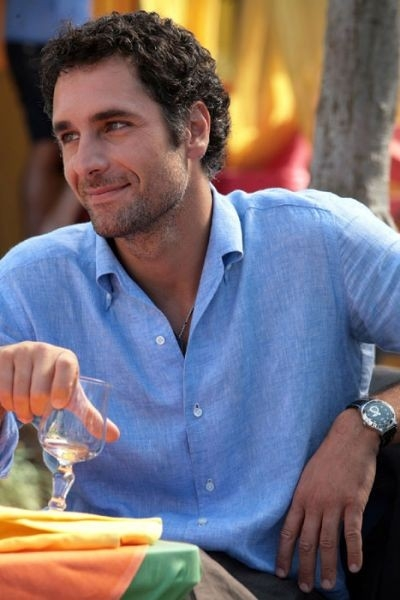
Bova in Scusa ma ti chiamo amore (2008)

=== Film ===
Year	Title	Role	Director	Notes
1992	Crazy Underwear	Rocco	Roberto D'Agostino	
1992	When We Were Repressed	Unknown	Pino Quartullo	Uncredited
1993	Cominciò tutto per caso	Romolo	Umberto Marino	
1993	Pretty Princess	Marco	Carlo Vanzina	
1995	Palermo - Milan One Way	Nino Di Venanzio	Claudio Fragasso	Flaiano Prizes for Best Actor; Nominated — David di Donatello for Best Supporting Actor
1996	The Nymph	Pietro	Lina Wertmüller	
1996	The Border	Emidio Olrich	Franco Giraldi	
1996	La lupa	Nanni Lasca	Gabriele Lavia	
1997	Hercules	Hercules (voice)	Ron Clements, John Musker	Italian dub
1997	The Mayor	Rafiluccio	Ugo Fabrizio Giordani	
1998	Coppia omicida	Dario	Claudio Fragasso	
1998	Rewind	Paul Mansart	Sergio Gobbi	
1999	Terra bruciata	Francesco Loreano/ Tom Grasso	Fabio Segatori	
2001	The Knights of the Quest	Giacomo	Pupi Avati	
2002	Avenging Angelo	Marcello/ Gianni Carboni	Martyn Burke	
2003	Facing Windows	Lorenzo	Ferzan Özpetek	
2003	Under the Tuscan Sun	Marcello	Audrey Wells	
2004	Alien vs. Predator	Sebastian De Rosa	Paul W. S. Anderson	
2005	Stasera lo faccio	Professor	Alessio Gelsini Torresi	
2006	Ice on Fire	Fabrizio	Umberto Marino	
2007	I, the Other	Giuseppe	Mohsen Melliti	Italian Golden Globe Award for Best Actor
2007	Milano - Palermo: Il ritorno	Nino di Venanzio	Claudio Fragasso	
2008	Scusa ma ti chiamo amore	Alex Belli	Federico Moccia	
2008	Bolt	Bolt (voice)	Chris Williams, Byron Howard	Italian dub
2008	Aspettando il sole	Enea	Ago Panini	
2009	Sbirri	Matteo Gatti	Roberto Burchielli	Nastro d'Argento Special Silver Ribbon
2009	Baarìa	Journalist	Giuseppe Tornatore	Cameo appearance
2010	La bella società	Romolo	Gian Paolo Cugno	
2010	Sorry If I Want to Marry You	Alex Belli	Federico Moccia	
2010	La nostra vita	Piero	Daniele Luchetti	Nominated — David di Donatello for Best Supporting Actor
2010	Ti presento un amico	Marco Ferretti	Carlo Vanzina	
2010	The Tourist	Filippo Gaggia	Florian Henckel von Donnersmark	
2011	The Immature	Giorgio Romanini	Paolo Genovese	
2011	Escort in Love	Giulio	Massimiliano Bruno	Italian Golden Globe Award for Best Actor; Nominated — Nastro d'Argento for Best Actor
2012	The Immature: The Trip	Giorgio Romanini	Paolo Genovese	
2012	Viva l'Italia	Riccardo Spagnolo	Massimiliano Bruno	
2013	Out of the Blue	Andrea	Edoardo Leo	Nominated — Nastro d'Argento for Best Actor
2013	Guess Who's Coming for Christmas?	Francesco	Fausto Brizzi	
2014	Unique Brothers	Pietro	Alessio Maria Federici	
2014	Do You See Me?	Francesco	Riccardo Milani	
2015	Ever Been to the Moon?	Renzo	Paolo Genovese	
2015	The Choice	Giorgio	Michele Placido	
2015	Torno indietro e cambio vita	Marco Damiani	Carlo Vanzina	
2016	All Roads Lead to Rome	Luca	Ella Lemhagen	
2019	The Addams Family	Uncle Fester (voice)	Greg Tiernan, Conrad Vernon	Italian dub
2022	The Christmas Show	Pierre	Alberto Ferrari	
2022	Chip 'n Dale: Rescue Rangers	Chip (voice)	Akiva Schaffer	Italian dub
2024	Still Fabulous	Donato	Michela Andreozzi	

=== Television ===
Year	Title	Role	Notes
1992	Una storia italiana	Giuliano Amitrano	Miniseries; 2 episodes
1995–1998	La piovra	Gianni Breda	Main role (season 7-9)
1998	Il quarto re	Alazhar	Television film
1998	Ultimo	Roberto "Ultimo" Di Stefano	Miniseries; 2 episodes
1999	Ultimo – La sfida	Roberto "Ultimo" Di Stefano	Miniseries; 2 episodes
2000	Distretto di Polizia	Ferdinando	Episode: "L'agguato"
2001	Il testimone	Marco Basile	Miniseries; 2 episodes
2002	Francesca e Nunziata	Federico Montorsi	Television film
2002	St. Francis	Francesco	Miniseries; 2 episodes
2002	Scherzi a parte	Himself	Episode: "Episode 1"
2003	Ultimo – L'infiltrato	Roberto "Ultimo"	Miniseries; 2 episodes
2005	Karol: A Man Who Became Pope	Tomasz Zaleski	Miniseries; 2 episodes
2006	Attacco allo Stato	Diego Marra	Miniseries; 2 episodes
2006–2007	What About Brian	Angelo	Recurring role; 7 episodes
2007	Nassiryia – Per non dimenticare	Stefano Carboni	Miniseries; 2 episodes
2007	The Company	Roberto Escalona	Episode: "Episode 3"
2008	I Cesaroni	Himself	Episode: "La posta del cuore"
2008	15 Seconds	Actor	Short film; also producer
2009	Intelligence: Servizi & segreti	Marco Tancredi	Main role; 6 episodes
2011	Treasure Guards	Angelo	Television film
2011–2013	Come un delfino	Alessandro Dominici	Main role; 6 episodes
2013	Ultimo – L'occhio del falco	Roberto "Ultimo"	Miniseries; 2 episodes
2013	Family Guy	Mafia leader (voice)	Episode: "Boopa-dee Bappa-dee"
2014	Angeli – Una storia d'amora	Claudio	Television film
2016	Fuoco Amico TF45 – Eroe per amore	Enea De Santis	Main role; 8 episodes, also producer
2018	Medici	Pope Sixtus IV	Main role (season 2); 6 episodes
2018	Ultimo – Caccia ai Narcos	Roberto "Ultimo"	Miniseries; 2 episodes
2019	La Reina del Sur	Francesco Belmondo	Main role; 58 episodes
2021–2023	Buongiorno mamma	Guido Borghi	Lead role; 24 episodes
2022–present	Don Matteo	Father Massimo	Main role (seasons 13–present)
2023	Belve	Himself	Interview (season 9)
2024–2025	Emily in Paris	Giancarlo	Recurring role, 5 episodes
