= List of 2009 box office number-one films in Italy =

This is a list of films which have placed number one at the weekend box office in Italy during 2009.

== Number-one films ==
†	This implies the highest-grossing movie of the year.

#	Weekend End Date	Film	Total Weekend Gross	Notes
1	January 4, 2009	Madagascar: Escape 2 Africa	$16,479,785	(animated film)
2	January 11, 2009	Seven Pounds	$15,227,577	
3	January 18, 2009	Seven Pounds	$16,627,449	
4	January 25, 2009	Italians	$17,232,915	Italy
5	February 1, 2009	Italians	$14,181,736	
6	February 8, 2009	Ex	$14,234,973	Italy
7	February 15, 2009	The Curious Case of Benjamin Button	$13,757,206	
8	February 22, 2009	The Curious Case of Benjamin Button	$11,002,656	
9	March 1, 2009	Confessions of a Shopaholic	$11,673,142	
10	March 8, 2009	Watchmen	$10,009,424	
11	March 15, 2009	La matassa	$10,859,021	Italy
12	March 22, 2009	La matassa	$10,428,016	
13	March 29, 2009	Gran Torino	$10,626,358	
14	April 5, 2009	Monsters Vs. Aliens	$10,901,881	
15	April 12, 2009	Monsters Vs. Aliens	$9,017,099	
16	April 19, 2009	Fast & Furious	$12,566,311	
17	April 26, 2009	Fast & Furious	$8,802,525	
18	May 3, 2009	X-Men Origins: Wolverine	$9,435,025	
19	May 10, 2009	My Bloody Valentine 3-D	$7,757,474	
20	May 17, 2009	Angels & Demons	$12,218,881	
21	May 24, 2009	Angels & Demons	$7,530,834	
22	May 31, 2009	Angels & Demons	$8,280,204	
23	June 7, 2009	Terminator Salvation	$6,735,340	
24	June 14, 2009	Un'estate ai Caraibi	$4,063,324	Italy
25	June 21, 2009	Coraline	$5,943,567	
26	June 28, 2009	Transformers: Revenge of the Fallen	$7,686,538	
27	July 5, 2009	Transformers: Revenge of the Fallen	$3,948,800	(animated film)
28	July 12, 2009	Transformers: Revenge of the Fallen	$2,684,048	
29	July 19, 2009	Harry Potter and the Half Blood Prince	$8,279,359	
30	July 26, 2009	Harry Potter and the Half Blood Prince	$3,380,500	
31	August 2, 2009	Harry Potter and the Half Blood Prince	$2,186,274	
32	August 9, 2009	Harry Potter and the Half Blood Prince	$1,592,236	
33	August 16, 2009	Sex Drive	$1,429,964	
34	August 23, 2009	The Haunting in Connecticut	$2,201,023	
35	August 30, 2009	Ice Age: Dawn of the Dinosaurs †	$11,635,843	(animated film)
36	September 6, 2009	Ice Age: Dawn of the Dinosaurs †	$11,970,968	
37	September 13, 2009	Ice Age: Dawn of the Dinosaurs †	$11,564,622	
38	September 20, 2009	Ice Age: Dawn of the Dinosaurs †	$10,643,616	
39	September 27, 2009	Baarìa - La porta del vento	$11,563,669	Italy
40	October 4, 2009	Baarìa - La porta del vento	$12,048,513	
41	October 11, 2009	Inglourious Basterds	$10,815,564	
42	October 18, 2009	Up	$12,854,374	
43	October 25, 2009	Up	$13,088,258	
44	November 1, 2009	Up	$12,396,074	
45	November 8, 2009	Public Enemies	$12,616,168	
46	November 15, 2009	2012	$16,056,246	
47	November 22, 2009	The Twilight Saga: New Moon	$19,331,055	
48	November 29, 2009	Cado dalle Nubi	$15,933,084	Italy
49	December 6, 2009	A Christmas Carol	$15,241,779	
50	December 13, 2009	A Christmas Carol	$10,209,251	
51	December 20, 2009	Natale a Beverly Hills	$12,657,706	Italy
52	December 27, 2009	Natale a Beverly Hills		

== Highest-grossing films ==
=== Calendar Gross ===
Highest-grossing films of 2009 by Calendar Gross

Rank	Title	Distributor	Gross €	Admissions
1.	Ice Age: Dawn of the Dinosaurs	20th Century Fox Italia	29,700,788	4,055,708
2.	Angels & Demons	Sony Pictures Italia	18,724,657	2,988,759
3.	Harry Potter and the Half-Blood Prince	Warner Bros. Italia	18,363,508	2,994,664
4.	Natale a Beverly Hills	Filmauro	16,479,369	2,553,699
5.	The Twilight Saga: New Moon	Eagle Pictures	16,427,515	2,554,715
6.	2012	Sony Pictures Italia	14,314,595	2,246,384
7.	Cado dalle nubi	Medusa Film	12,787,578	2,078,499
8.	Italians	Filmauro	12,159,598	1,988,535
9.	Seven Pounds	Sony Pictures Italia	11,258,003	1,824,887
10.	A Christmas Carol	Walt Disney Studios Motion Pictures Italia	11,029,695	1,205,022

== See also ==
- List of Italian films - Italian films by year

== Notes ==
- All the films are North American or British productions, except when stated differently.
