= Michela Quattrociocche =

Italian film actress

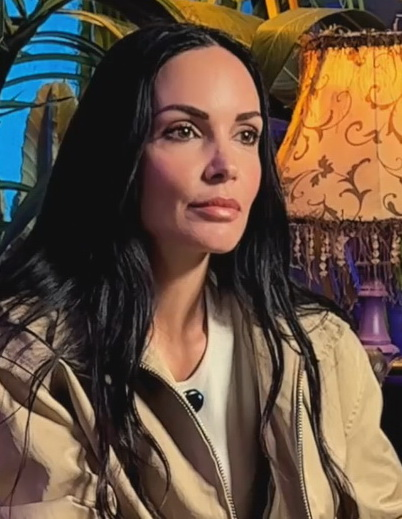
- Quattrociocche in 2025
- Born: 3 December 1988 (age 37); Rome, Italy
- Occupation: Actress
- Spouse: Alberto Aquilani (m. 2012; div. 2020)
- Children: 2

Michela Quattrociocche (born 3 December 1988) is an Italian film actress.

== Acting career ==
Quattrociocche made her cinematic debut in the 2008 comedy film Scusa ma ti chiamo amore, directed by Federico Moccia. In this film she played Niki, a free-spirited teenager in her last year of high school who romances a 37-year-old man. She landed the role after her mother sent her pictures to casting; she auditioned for the role while she was taking her high school graduation exams. Following the success of Scusa ma ti chiamo amore, Quattrociocche appeared in other movies directed by Moccia: a cameo in Amore 14, and reprising her role as Niki in Scusa ma ti voglio sposare, the sequel to her first film. She has also appeared in Neri Parenti's 2009 film Natale a Beverly Hills and the 2010 film Una canzone per te.

== Personal life ==
Quattrociocche married Alberto Aquilani on 4 July 2012. Together, they have two daughters: Aurora (b. 18 April 2011) and Diamante (b. 3 November 2014). On 11 May 2020, it was announced that the two had separated.

== Filmography ==
Year	Film	Role	Other notes
2008	Scusa ma ti chiamo amore	Niki	Directed by Federico Moccia
2009	Natale a Beverly Hills	Susanna	Directed by Neri Parenti
2010	Scusa ma ti voglio sposare	Niki	Directed by Federico Moccia
2010	Una canzone per te	Silvia	Directed by Herbert Simone Paragnani
