= All Roads Lead to Rome (2015 film) =

- Theatrical release poster
- Directed by: Ella Lemhagen
- Written by: Josh Appignanesi; Cindy Myers
- Produced by: Monika Bacardi; Andrea Iervolino; Silvio Muraglia
- Starring: Sarah Jessica Parker; Raoul Bova; Claudia Cardinale; Rosie Day; Paz Vega
- Cinematography: Gergely Pohárnok
- Edited by: Thomas Lagerman
- Music by: Alfonso González Aguilar
- Production companies: Ambi Pictures; Paradox Studios
- Distributed by: Momentum Pictures (United States)
- Release date: December 16, 2015 (Dubai Film Fest)
- Countries: United States; United Kingdom; Italy; Spain; Sweden
- Language: English
- Box office: $524,368

All Roads Lead to Rome is a 2015 romantic comedy film directed by Ella Lemhagen and written by Josh Appignanesi and Cindy Myers. The film stars Sarah Jessica Parker, Raoul Bova, Rosie Day, Paz Vega, and Claudia Cardinale.

== Plot ==
Set in valleys of Tuscany, Maggie returns to a town where she spent her youth, along with her daughter, when she comes across her ex Luca and his mother Carmen, who live in a villa nearby. Decades earlier, Luca and Maggie were wildly in love, but she left one day for America and cut off communication with Luca completely. Luca, who still harbours feelings for Maggie, tries to win her back.

Meanwhile, Maggie's daughter Summer is desperate to get back to America and her selfish boyfriend Tyler (who wants her to take the blame for a recent drug charge, arguing that as she's a juvenile she'd receive a less serious sentence than him), and Luca's mother Carmen wants to unite and marry her 60s youth flame Marcellino, whom she had been recently exchanging love letters with. In the chaos that follows, Summer and Carmen steal Luca's car and race for Rome, where Carmen and Marcellino have planned their secret wedding at a church. Summer, initially planning to leave for America via Rome airport, on seeing the honor and love of Carmen realizes that she is being used by Tyler, and surprisingly finds love in farm girl Ermenegilda. Maggie and Luca, racing behind the two, also bicker about their past, and rekindle their love as they head for Rome.

== Cast ==
- Sarah Jessica Parker as Maggie Falk, an American journalist revisiting Italy with her rebellious daughter
- Raoul Bova as Luca, Maggie's former love interest from a visit decades earlier to Italy
- Claudia Cardinale as Carmen, Luca's mother
- Rosie Day as Summer Falk, Maggie's daughter
- Paz Vega as Giulia Carni, a television reporter and Luca's one-time love interest
- Marco Bonini as Inspector Moravia
- Nadir Caselli as Valentina, Luca's daughter
- Barney Harris as Tyler, Summer's boyfriend
- Shel Shapiro as Marcellino, Carmen's pop group bandmate from the 60s
- Rocio Muñoz as Ermenegilda, Summer's newfound lesbian love interest

== Production ==
Casting announcements were made in October 2014. Shel Shapiro, who plays Carmen's love interest from their 1960s pop band in the film, was actually a member of the 1960s Italian pop group The Rokes. Rocio Munoz, who helps the troubled Summer realize her lesbian side, is the real life partner of Raoul Bova, the film's male lead – the couple had their first child in December 2015, the same month the film was released.

Filming began on October 20, 2014, in Rome, Italy.

== Release ==
The film saw limited release in international markets, earning just $524,368 in box office receipts.

Momentum Pictures acquired the North American rights to the film in February 2016, releasing it direct-to-video and video on demand for the North American market in March 2016.
