= Rocío Muñoz Morales =

Spanish actress

Rocío Muñoz
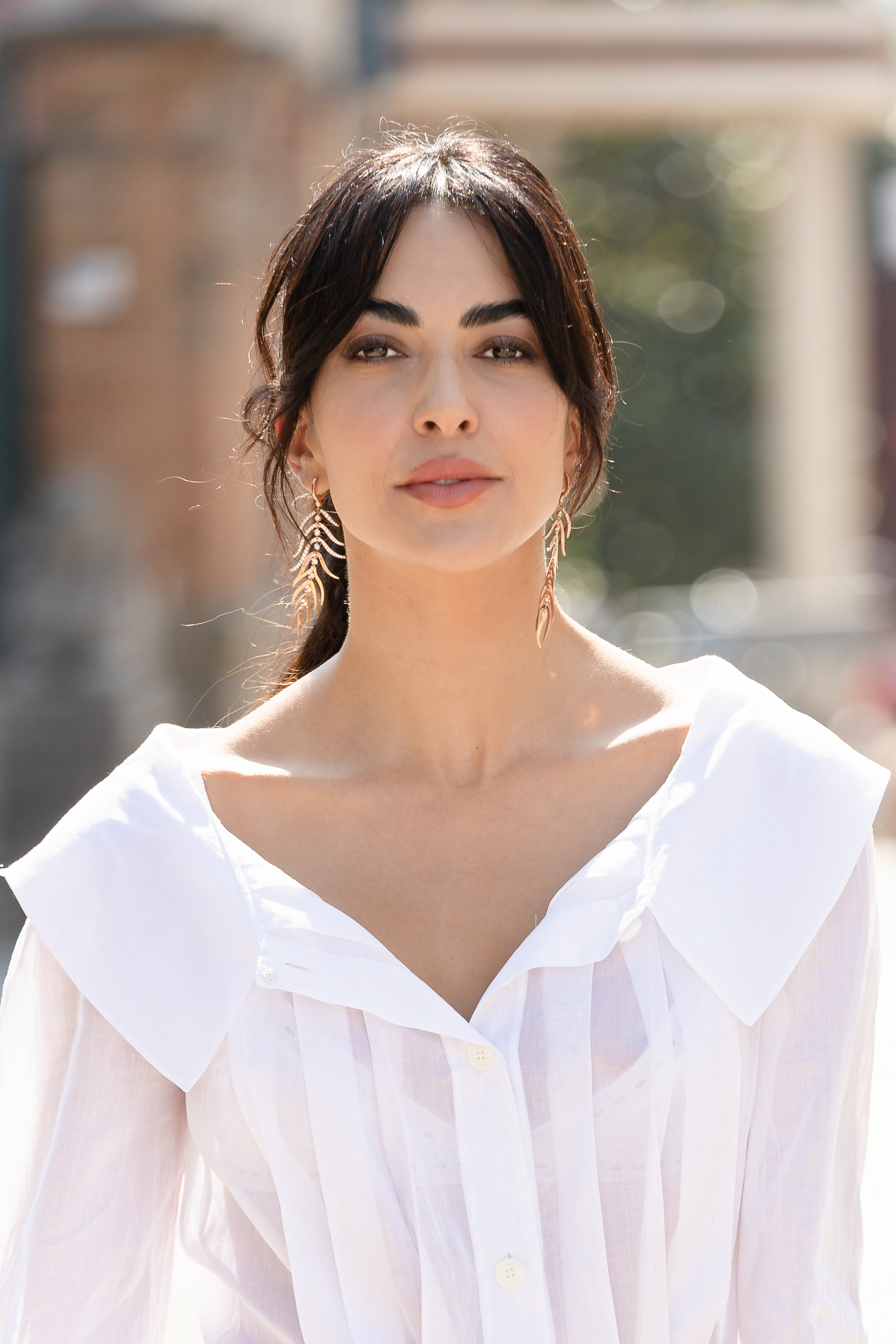
- Born: 10 June 1988 (age 38); Madrid, Spain
- Occupations: Actress, model
- Years active: 2010–present
- Partner: Raoul Bova (2013–2025)
- Children: 2

Rocío Muñoz Morales (Spanish pronunciation: [roˈθi.o muˈɲoθ moˈɾales]; born 10 June 1988) is a Spanish actress, presenter, and model with Italian citizenship, who has spent most of her career in Italy. She began her career as a dancer and went on to appear in film and in the theatre. In 2018 she returned to Spain to present the Spanish version of Dancing with the Stars.

== Biography ==
Born in Madrid in 1988, she began her dance studies at the age of six, specializing in ballroom dancing; she reached the highest category in this specialty at the age of twelve and became one of the Spanish elite in this dance discipline, combining it with her school studies. Her debut on television was as a teacher and dancer in the program ¡Mira quién baila!, which was broadcast by TVE and later by Telecinco, under the name ¡Más que baile!.

She began to develop her international career as a dancer with Spanish singer Julio Iglesias, taking part in some of his world tours, such as Live, Julio Iglesias en concierto and 40 años. In 2010, she debuted as an actress in La pecera de Eva, produced by Isla Producciones and broadcast on Telecinco. That same year, she played the character of Samantha in the second season of the series Ángel o demonio, on Telecinco. In 2012 she stars in the comedy Todo es posible en el bajo, produced and directed by Jose Luis Moreno.

In her career as a model, she has collaborated with numerous fashion and advertising brands. In addition, she has also posed for magazines such as Elle, Vogue, Woman, Telva, Glamour, Vanity Fair, Grazia or Yo Donna; she has also been the image of brands such as Vodafone, Mercedes, L'Oréal, Nescafé, Media Markt, Hello Kitty, Disney, etc.

In 2012, she premiered her first work in international cinema, becoming a great success with critics and audiences with the film The Immature: The Trip, directed by Paolo Genovese. That same year, she presented the program Premier Casino, which she also presented the following year.

In 2014, she joined the third season of the hit Italian TV series Un passo dal cielo, in which she would play Eva Fernandez for two more seasons until 2019.

In 2015, she presented the Sanremo Music Festival alongside Carlo Conti, an event that definitely launched her career in Italy. In the same year, she appears as Anna Rossi Ribeiro in Tango per la libertà, a two-part Rai 1 miniseries. As well, she is in the American movie All Roads Lead to Rome, directed by Ella Lemhagen and stars Sarah Jessica Parker.

In 2017, she made her theatrical debut in the production Certe notti, directed by Giuseppe Miale di Mauro. In the same year, she co-stars with Massimo Boldi in Neri Parenti's film Natale da chef. In November 2017, she returns to the stage with the social satire comedy Dì Che Ti Manda Picone, which will tour throughout Italy.In 2018, she made her film debut as one of the female protagonists in Tu Mi Nascondi Qualcosa.

In May 2018, she returned to her native country to present, alongside Roberto Leal, the first edition of Bailando con las estrellas on TVE, a format of great success worldwide (Dancing with the Stars).

She has written two books: Un posto tutto mio (2021) and Dove nasce il sole (2022).

== Private life ==
She maintains a relationship with Italian actor Raoul Bova, with whom on December 2, 2015 she had a daughter, Luna. On November 1, 2018, her second daughter, Alma, was born. Since 2017, Roco has been the face of the Chicco Di Felicità charity campaign, supported by the Chicco children's brand in favor of the defense of minors in need.

Rocío Muñoz Morales is Roman Catholic.

== Filmography ==
=== Films ===
Year	Title	Character	Directed by	Country	Role
2012	The Immature: The Trip	Anna	Paolo Genovese	Italy	Secondary role
2015	All Roads Lead to Rome	Ermenegilda	Ella Lemhagen	United States	Secondary role
2017	Natale da chef	Perla	Neri Parenti	Italy	Main role
2018	Tu mi nascondi qualcosa	Jamila	Giuseppe Loconsole	Italy	Main role
2021	They Talk	Amanda	Giorgio Bruno	Italy	Main role

=== Television ===
Year	Title	Character	Country	Notes
2006 - 2010	¡Mira quién baila!	Ella misma	Spain	Teacher and dancer
2010	La pecera de Eva	Silvia	Spain	1 episode
2011	Ángel o demonio	Samantha	Spain	10 episodes
2012	¿Bailas?	Blanca	Spain	1 episode
2012	Todo es posible en el bajo	Paula	Spain	13 episodes
2012 - 2013	Premier casino	Ella misma	Spain	Host
2015	Festival de Sanremo	Ella misma	Italy	Host
2015 - 2019	A un paso del cielo	Eva Fernández	Italy	32 episodes
2016	Tango per la libertà	Anna Rossi Ribeiro	Italy	3 episodes
2018	Bailando con las estrellas	Ella misma	Spain	Host
2019 - 2021	¡Feliz 2020!	Ella misma	Spain	Host
2021	Giustizia per tutti	Victoria Bonetto	Italy	6 episodes
2021 - 2022	¡Feliz 2022!	Ella misma	Spain	Host

=== Theater ===
Year	Title	Character	Country	Role
2017	Certe notti	Camila	Italy	Main role
2018	Dì che ti manda Picone	Mara	Italy	Main role
