= Barbara Foria =

Italian actress, comedian and television presenter (born 1975)

- Foria in 2026
- Born: 28 July 1975 (age 51); Naples, Italy
- Education: University of Naples Federico II
- Occupations: Actress; comedian; television presenter; writer; radio presenter

Barbara Foria (born 28 July 1975) is an Italian actress, comedian, writer and television and radio presenter. She was born in Naples and graduated in law from the University of Naples Federico II before pursuing a career in comedy.

Foria appeared in several television comedy programmes before gaining wider recognition as a cast member of Colorado, where she performed comic sketches and character impersonations. Her screen credits include the films Natale da chef and Burraco fatale. Since 2015, Foria has hosted the radio programme Chi c'è c'è, chi non c'è non parla on RTL 102.5.

== Filmography ==
Film
Year	Title	Role	Notes
2012	All'ultima spiaggia	Woman interviewed	Feature film debut
2015	Fausto & Furio	Carmela	
2017	Natale da chef	Beata	
2020	Burraco fatale	President Fibur	
2023	Chi ha rapito Jerry Calà?	Rosa	
2024	Il mio regno per una farfalla	Donna Luisella	
