= Pretty Princess =

- Italian: Piccolo grande amore
- Directed by: Carlo Vanzina
- Written by: Carlo Vanzina; Enrico Vanzina
- Starring: Barbara Snellenburg; Raoul Bova
- Cinematography: Luigi Kuveiller
- Edited by: Sergio Montanari
- Production companies: Video 80; Reteitalia
- Distributed by: Columbia TriStar Films Italia
- Release date: 3 December 1993
- Running time: 105 minutes
- Country: Italy
- Language: Italian

Pretty Princess (Italian: Piccolo grande amore, lit. 'Little big love') is a 1993 Italian romantic comedy film directed by Carlo Vanzina.

== Plot ==
Liechtenhaus (a fictional tiny European principality) is ruled by Prince Max, but the little country is nearly bankrupt. In fact, if he can't get an infusion of cash quickly, he may have to sell the royal palace to American developers as a casino complex. Fortunately, he's got a very pretty daughter, Princess Sofia and the dowry he will get from marrying her off to the unappealing, but wealthy heir to a similar nearby principality will more than get his tiny country in the clear. Unfortunately for him, his daughter is adamant about refusing this arranged marriage and prefers romance with a handsome but penniless windsurfing instructor to saving her country. Nefarious schemes are called for and when the Princess is kidnapped, something must be done.

== Production ==
As with other Vanzina films, there is also a longer television version, first broadcast on 6 January 1998 at 8:45pm on Italia 1. Among the additional scenes: a dialogue between the protagonist and her nanny and the night-time encounter with the ecologist kids on the beach, played by Chiara Sani and Jimmy Ghione, and a scene in which Countess von Dix reveals her betrayal to her brother, Prince Maximilian. The latter version is available on DVD distributed by Medusa in 2010 and by Mustang Entertainment in 2013.

== Cast ==
- Barbara Snellenburg as Princess Sofia
- Raoul Bova as Marco
- David Warner as Prince Max
- Susannah York as Queen Christina
- Paul Freeman as Count Otto Von Dix
- Catherine Schell as Countess Von Dix
- Liz Smith as Queen Mother
- Jessica Simpson as Princess Astrid
- Marc Sinden as Captain Benadotti
- Alessio Avenali as Rafael Botero
- Bettina Giovannini as Olivia
- Francesca Ventura as Rita
- Godfrey James as Franz
- Adam Barker as Prince Frederick
- Julian Rhind-Tutt as Barone von Bismarck
- Sarah Alexander as Ursula
- Virginie Marsan as Laura
- Tilly Blackwood as Princess
- Shane Rimmer as Mr. Hughes

== See also ==
- List of Italian films of 1993
