= Isola del Garda =

Island on Lake Garda, Italy

Coordinates: 45.593641°N 10.587094°E

Native name: Isola Borghese
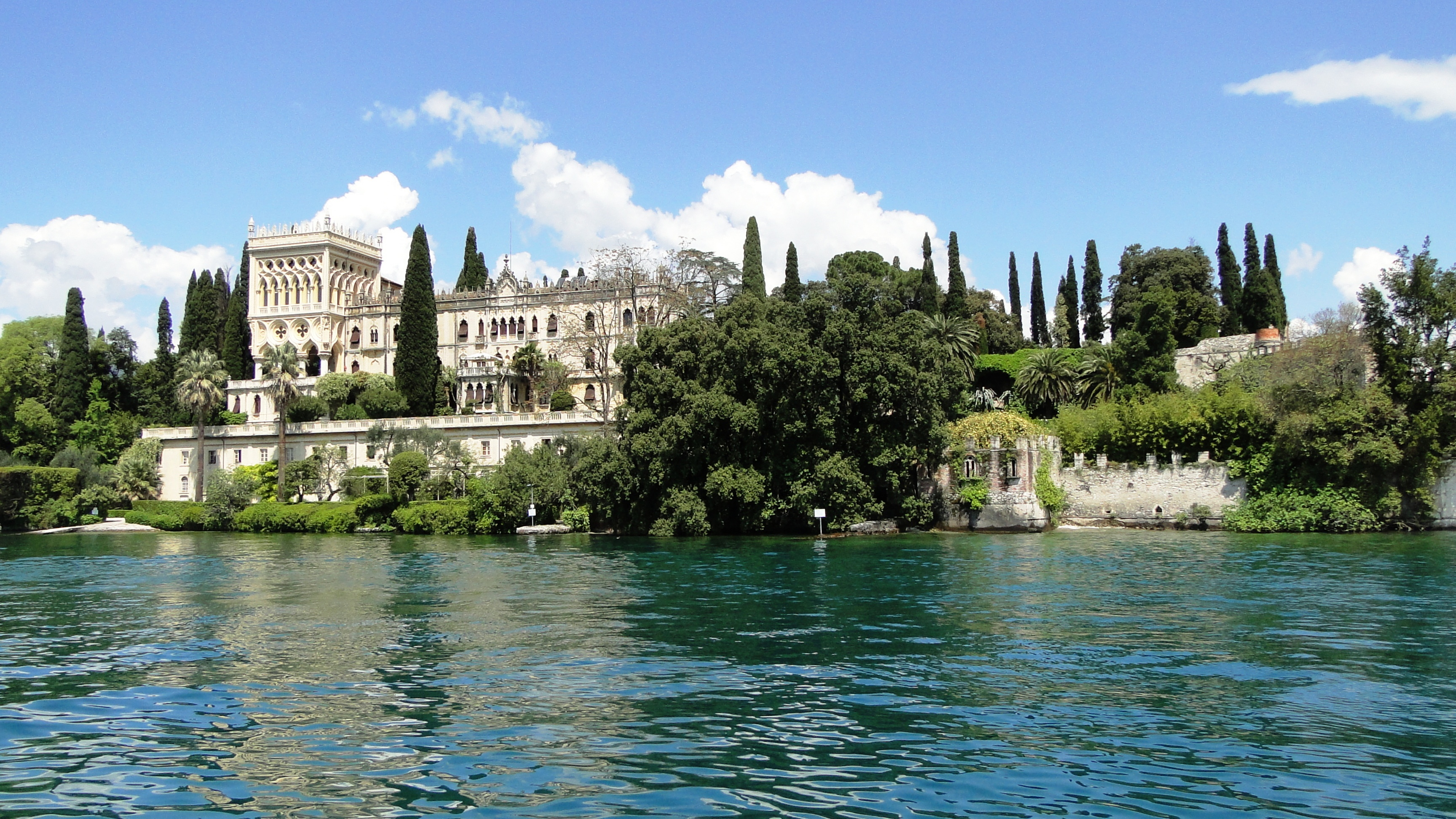
- The island viewed from the lake, with 19th-century fortifications on the right
- Interactive map of Isola del Garda

Geography
- Location: Lake Garda
- Area: 0.07 km^{2} (0.027 sq mi)
- Highest elevation: 88 m (289 ft)

Administration
- Italy
- Region: Lombardy
- Province: Brescia
- Comune: San Felice del Benaco

Demographics
- Population: 10

Isola del Garda, Isola di Garda, or Isola Borghese is the biggest island on Lake Garda. It is part of the comune of San Felice del Benaco, in the Province of Brescia, Lombardy, Italy. The island has a long and varied history, having been used as a Roman burial ground, pirate lair, a site for a Franciscan monastery, border fortification and as a residential villa. The island has been visited by numerous famous people over the centuries, reportedly including Francis of Assisi, Anthony of Padua and Dante Alighieri. Today, it is covered by a park and is dominated by the Venetian neo-Gothic Villa Borghese Cavazza. Although privately owned by the Cavazza family, Isola del Garda has been open to visitors since 2002.

== Geography ==
Isola del Garda is located in the southwest of Lake Garda, just south of the Gulf of Salò, close to the town of San Felice del Benaco, in the province of Brescia. It is separated from Capo San Fermo by only about 220 meters of open water and it is the largest island on the lake. The island (or actually islands, since Isola del Garda includes some small outcroppings of rock and most of the park is divided from the house by a narrow channel) was initially just rocks jutting out from the lake. All the soil for the gardens was brought in over time by the inhabitants. The island is around 1.1 km (0.7 mi) long, but only around 70 metres (230 feet) wide at the widest point. It is now mostly covered by a park and formal gardens with a large variety of plants.

== History ==
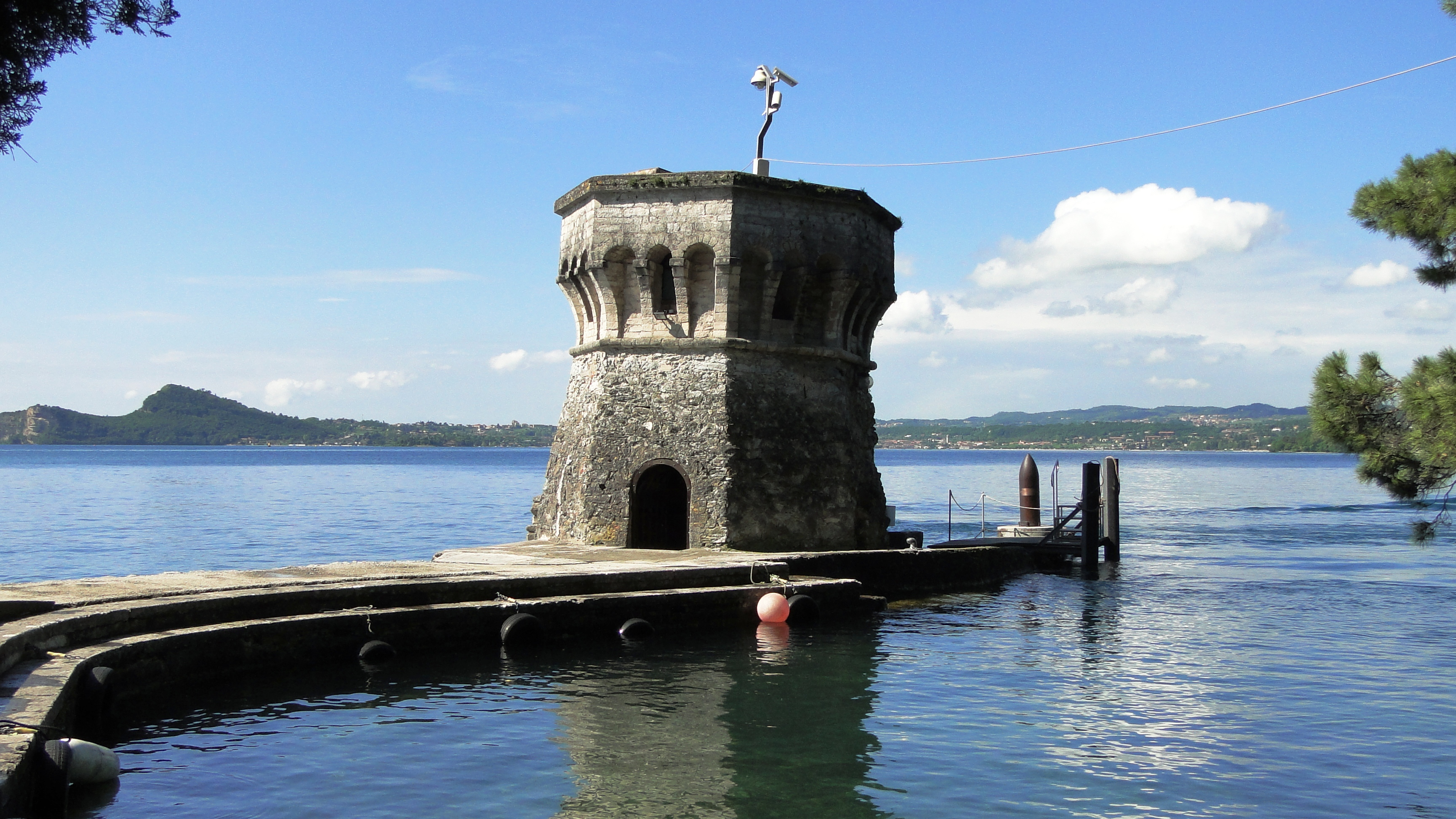
The quay and leaning tower stump, built in the early 19th century, with the Rocca di Manerba in the background.

The island has been known in turn as Insula Cranie ("Isle of Skulls"), Isola dei Frati ("Isle of Monks"), Isola Scotti, Isola Lechi, Isola de Ferrari and Isola Borghese. It has likely been inhabited since the Roman period. 130 Gallo-Roman tombstones found on the island indicate that it was at least used as a burial area at that time. Remains of votive temples have also been discovered. After having been abandoned during the period of decline of the Roman Empire, the island served for a long time as a hideout for pirates preying on shipping on Lake Garda.

The island is first mentioned in written documents in a decree by Duke Carloman of Bavaria, dated 879, which granted the island to the monks of Zeno of Verona. However, they did not retain it, as it was mentioned again in 1180, when Emperor Frederick I granted it as a fief to one Biemino of Manerba. Around 1220, Francis of Assisi travelled through northern Italy. Although it is not certain whether he actually visited the island, the Franciscans did establish a simple hermitage among the caves and rocks of the island at that time, after it was bestowed on them by Biemino. In 1224, the Bishop of Trent visited the hermitage and three years later so did reportedly Anthony of Padua in 1227. According to local legend, in 1304, Dante Alighieri came to the island and later referred to it in his Divine Comedy as:

Loco è nel mezzo là dove 'l trentino
pastore e quel di Brescia e 'l veronese
segnar poria, s'e' fesse quel cammino
(Inferno, Canto XX)

In 1422, Bernardino of Siena was on the island for the first of several visits and in that period a Franciscan convent was constructed. It was rebuilt and expanded in 1438, the added church was named Santa Maria dello Scoglio. In 1470, Father Francesco Licheto (1450–1520), a member of the noble Lechi family from Brescia, founded a school of theology and philosophy on the island. In 1517, a religious commentary he wrote was printed for him by Paganino Paganini on the island, and became the first printed book to be published in the whole region around Lake Garda. Giano Fregoso, Doge of Genoa, and his son Alessandro used the island as a retreat. However, after Licheto's death the religious community there went into decline. From 1685 to 1697 it was a convent for novices.

In 1795, the government of the Republic of Venice decided to suppress the monastery. Its last head, Bonaventura di Casalloro, was forced to close the monastery and leave the island with the remaining monks. The property was then requisitioned by a decree of Napoleon Bonaparte in 1798, after the establishment of the Cisalpine Republic. Its government sold the island to private owners in 1800. After passing through several hands, it was bought in 1817 by Count Luigi Lechi from Brescia. He ordered major construction and renovation works and the monastery was turned into a villa. Lechi was also a poet and among his guests were composers Gioachino Rossini and Gaetano Donizetti, the writers Ippolito Pindemonte and Cesare Arici as well as painter Luigi Basiletti and architect Rodolfo Vantini. The latter designed the island's small port with its tower. Lechi's lover, the singer Adelaide Malanotte, was also a regular guest. In 1837, Luigi Lechi passed the property on to his brother Teodoro (1778–1866), a former general in the Napoleonic army, who – among other changes – added the terraces at the front of the villa.

In 1860, the island was expropriated by the newly unified Italian state and turned into a border fortification against the Austrians, who at the time still held the region of Venetia including the eastern shore of Lake Garda. Although some construction work was done, the idea to turn the island into a fortress was abandoned after the Austrians ceded most of their holdings in northern Italy to the Kingdom of Italy after the Third Italian War of Independence in 1866. After that, only the northern end of Lake Garda around Riva del Garda remained Austrian. In 1870, the island was sold at auction and purchased by Baron Scotti. He in turn sold it to Duke Gaetano de Ferrari (1818–1893) from Genoa. De Ferrari and his wife, the Russian aristocrat Maria Sergeyevna Annenkova (1837–1924), moved to the island.

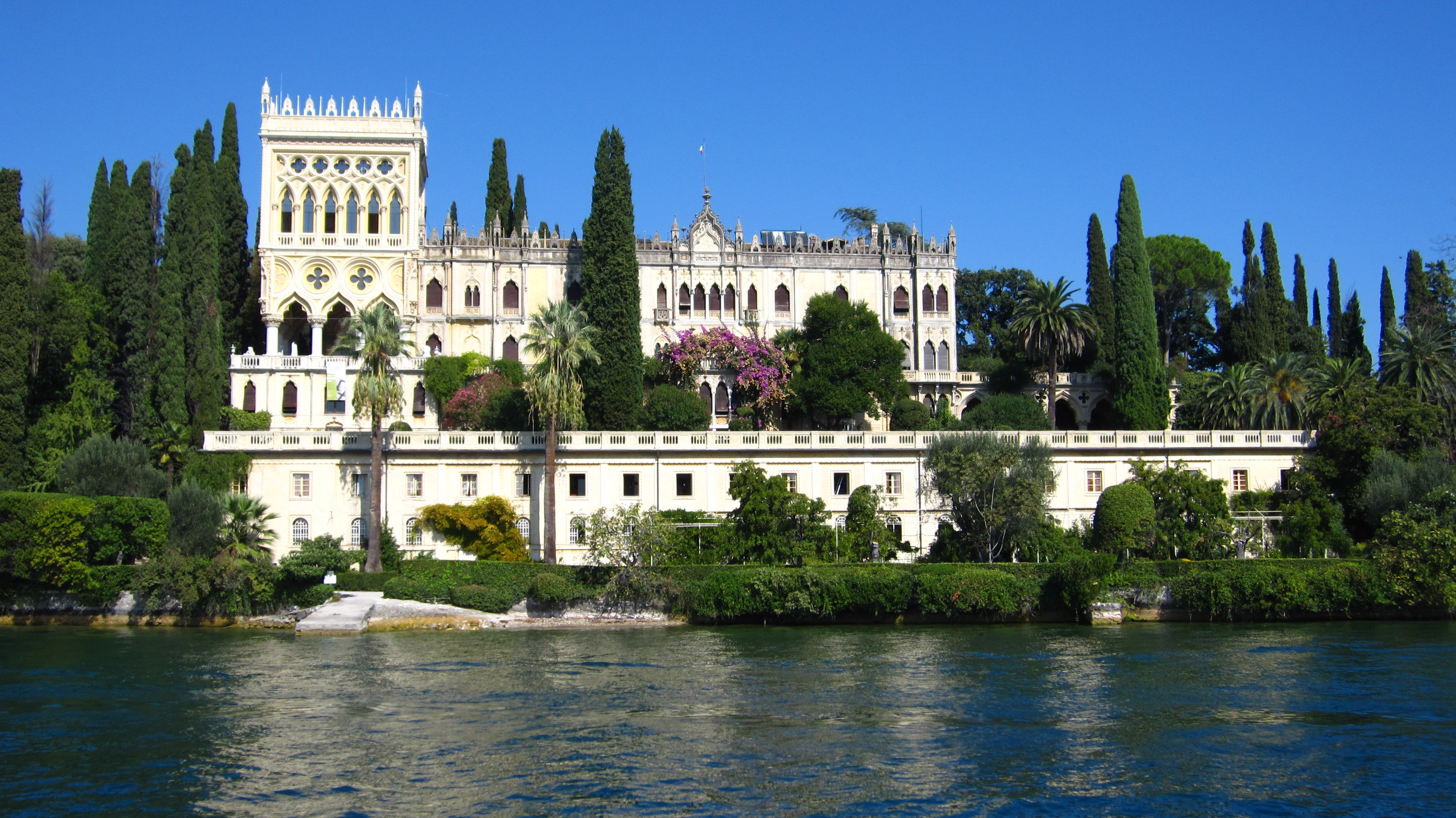
The Venetian neo-Gothic Villa Borghese Cavazza

Between 1880 and 1900 they had the park constructed, built containment walls to keep out the water and imported fertile earth and exotic plants. Whilst the park was designed from the beginning as an English landscape garden, the area in front of the house was laid out as a more formal Italian garden. In 1893, the Duke died, but the couple had previously decided to build a new villa on the site of the old Lechi villa. This Venetian neo-Gothic palace was constructed in 1890 to 1903, based on a design of architect Luigi Rovelli.

After the Duchess died, her daughter Anna Maria (1874–1924), wife of Prince Scipione Borghese from Rome, inherited the island but she survived her mother by only a few months. In 1927, the prince died, leaving the island to his daughter, Princess Livia Borghese (1901–1969), who was married to Count Alessandro Cavazza from Bologna (1895–1969). Their youngest son, Count Camillo Cavazza dei Conti Cavazza (1936–1981) married Lady Charlotte Sarah Alexandra Chetwynd-Talbot (1938–2023), the eldest daughter of the Earl of Shrewsbury in 1965. They had seven children before Camillo Cavazza died in 1981.

== Today ==
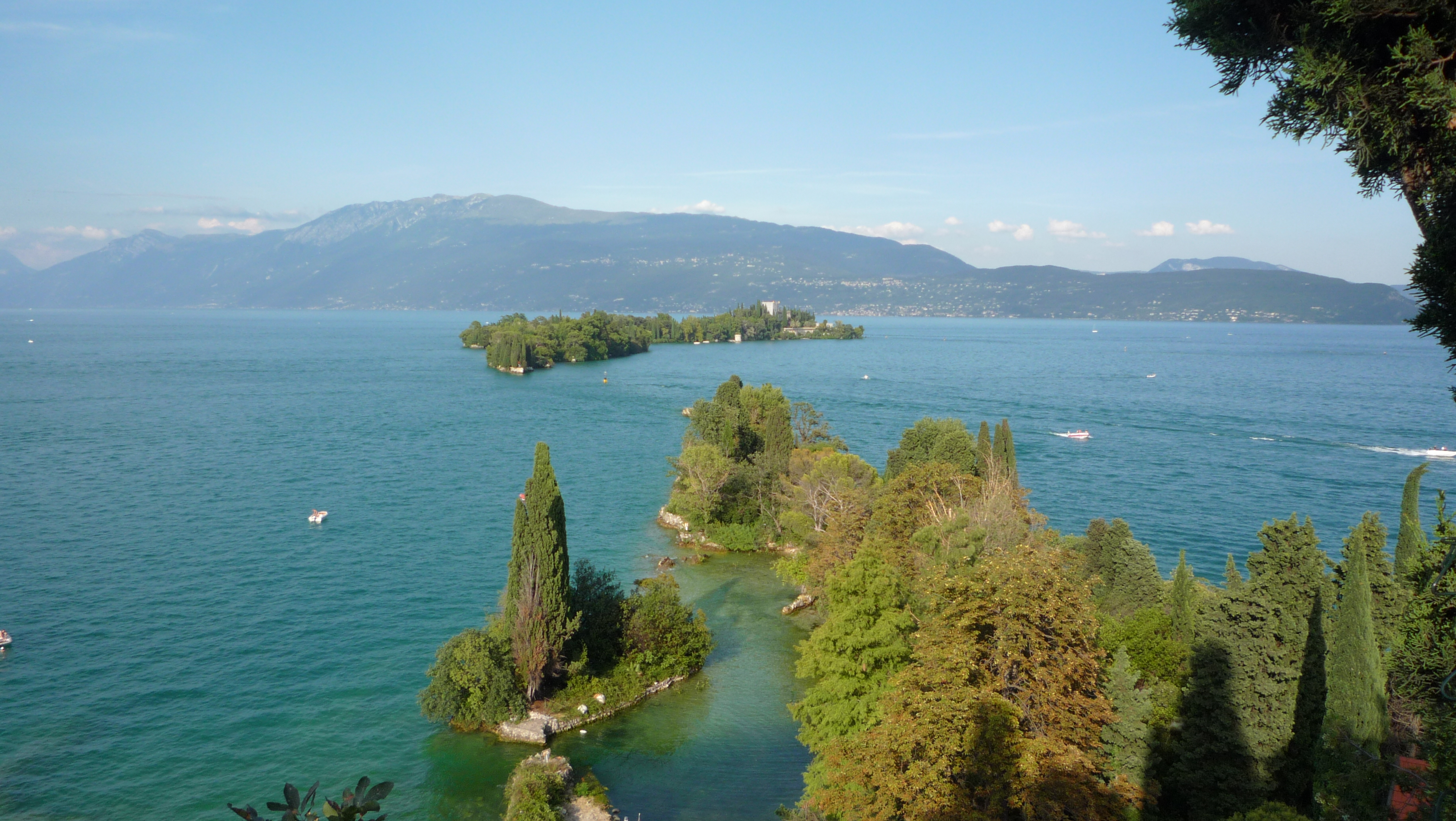
The island

Today the island is owned by Cavazza family. The family also owns properties on the nearby peninsula where they run businesses that include boat rental, olive growing, a camping site, an agriturismo and a riding school.

Since 2002 the island has been open to visitors on guided tours. It can also be rented for special events.

== See also ==
- Rocca di Manerba del Garda
