= Natale da chef =

- Film poster
- Directed by: Neri Parenti
- Written by: Neri Parenti; Alessandro Bencivenni; Gianluca Bomprezzi; Domenico Saverni
- Starring: Massimo Boldi
- Cinematography: Gino Sgreva
- Edited by: Luca Montanari
- Music by: Bruno Zambrini
- Release date: 14 December 2017
- Running time: 97 minutes
- Country: Italy
- Language: Italian

Natale da chef (lit. 'Christmas for chef') is a 2017 Italian Christmas comedy film directed by Neri Parenti.

== Cast ==
- Massimo Boldi as Gualtiero Saporito
- Biagio Izzo as Tony Cacace
- Dario Bandiera as Filippo Tosti
- Rocío Muñoz Morales as Perla
- Enzo Salvi as Mario Linatucci
- Paolo Conticini as Felice Becco
- Maurizio Casagrande as Furio Galli
- Milena Vukotic as Lina Renghi
- Fabrizio Buompastore as Nicola
- Francesca Chillemi as Laura Micheletti
- Barbara Foria as Beata
- Loredana De Nardis as Caterina
- Sylvia Panacione as Flavia
- Jacopo Sarno as Lorenzo
- Massimo De Lorenzo as Gentiletti
- Rishad Noorani as Chatu

== See also ==
- List of Christmas films
