= San Felice del Benaco =

- Comune
- Comune di San Felice del Benaco
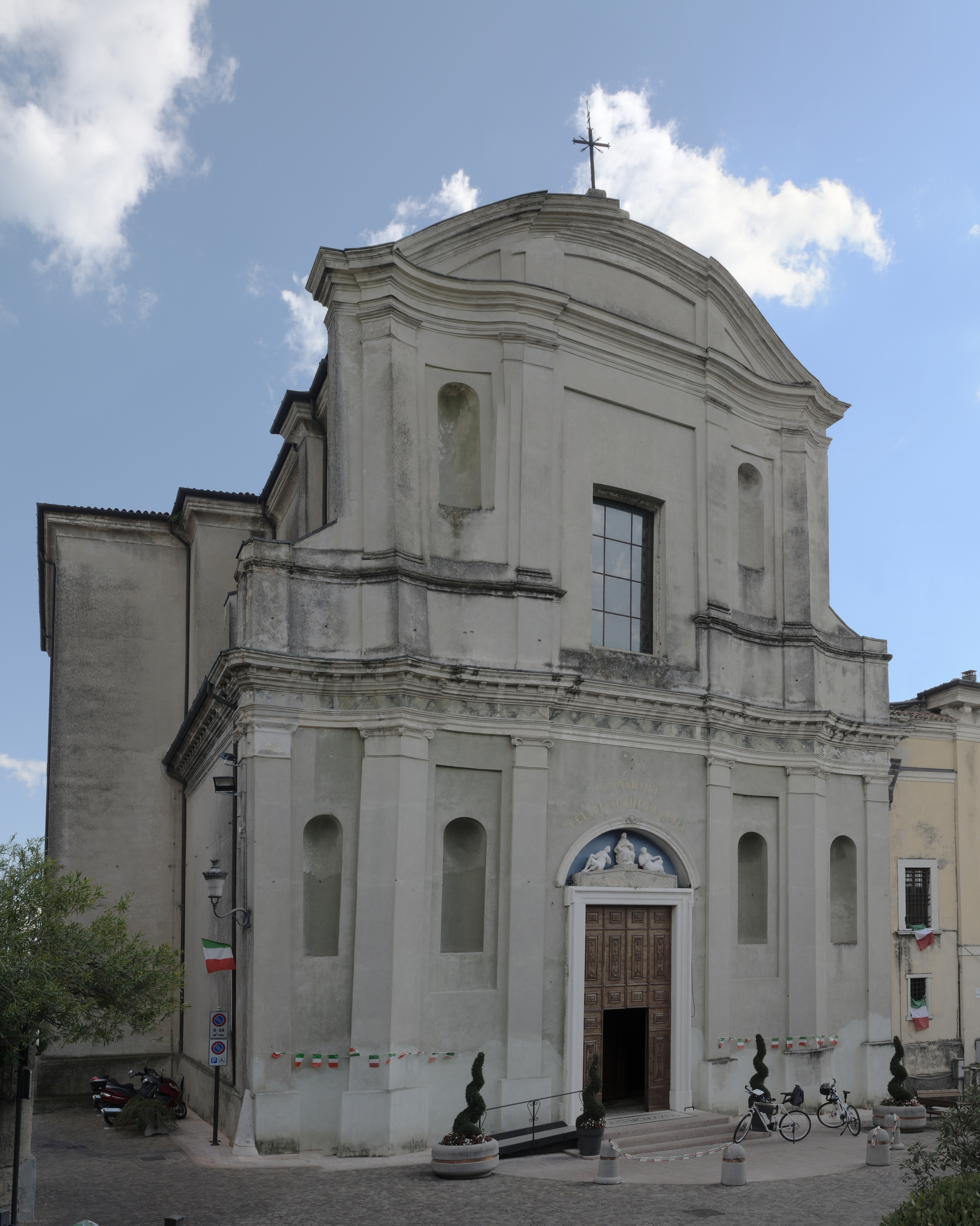

- Coat of arms

- Location within Italy Location within Lombardy
- Coordinates: 45°35′N 10°33′E
- Country: Italy
- Region: Lombardy
- Province: Brescia (BS)
- Frazioni: Cisano, Portese

Government
  - Mayor: Simone Zuin (SI)

Area
  - Total: 26 km^{2} (10 sq mi)
- Elevation: 109 m (358 ft)

Population (30 June 2011)
  - Total: 3,414
  - Density: 130/km^{2} (340/sq mi)
- Time zone: UTC+1 (CET)
  - Summer (DST): UTC+2 (CEST)
- Postal code: 25010
- Dialing code: 0365
- ISTAT code: 017171
- Patron saint: St.Felice and St.Adautto
- Saint day: August 30
- Website: Official website

San Felice del Benaco (Gardesano: San Filìs) is a comune in the province of Brescia, in Lombardy, northern Italy. The name derives most likely from the Latin sinus felix, meaning "pleasant harbour".

It is located on the western shore of the Lake Garda. The Isola del Garda, the largest island in the lake, is part of the municipality of San Felice. It is bounded by the municipalities of Salò, Puegnago sul Garda and Manerba del Garda.

== Main sights ==
- Sanctuary of the Madonna del Carmine, dating from the 15th century. It is a late example of Lombard Gothic architecture.
- Parish church (1740–1781). It houses frescoes by Carlo Innocenzo Carloni.
- Remains of the castle.
- Church of San Fermo (15th century), at Portese.
- Remains of the castle of Portese.
- abandoned spring factory "mollificio bresciano" by Vittoriano Viganò an important Italian architect.
