= I Told You So (2023 film) =

2023 Italian comedy film

I Told You so
- French: Te l’avevo detto
- Directed by: Ginevra Elkann
- Written by: Ginevra Elkann; Chiara Barzini; Ilaria Bernardini
- Produced by: Simone Gattoni; Lorenzo Mieli; Paolo Sorrentino; Moreno Zani
- Starring: Valeria Golino; Valeria Bruni Tedeschi; Danny Huston; Riccardo Scamarcio; Alba Rohrwacher; Greta Scacchi; Sofia Panizzi
- Cinematography: Vladan Radovic
- Edited by: Desideria Rayner
- Production companies: The Apartment Pictures; Rai Cinema; Tenderstories
- Distributed by: BIM Distribuzione; The Match Factory
- Release date: 8 September 2023 (TIFF)
- Running time: 100 minutes
- Country: Italy
- Language: Italian

I Told You So (Italian: Te l’avevo detto) is an Italian drama film, directed by Ginevra Elkann and released in 2023. The film centres on several intertwining storylines about people coping with anxieties in Rome after the temperature has reached an unprecedented 50 degrees Celsius in January.

The film's cast includes Valeria Golino as Pupa, a fading former porn star; Valeria Bruni Tedeschi as Gianna, her devoutly religious former friend who returns with a score to settle; Sofia Panizzi as Gianna's daughter Mila; Danny Huston as Bill, a priest struggling with drug addiction; Alba Rohrwacher as Caterina, an alcoholic who is turning to Bill for spiritual guidance; and Greta Scacchi as Frances, Bill's sister who has returned to town to bury their mother after her death. Riccardo Scamarcio, Gianmarco Saurino, Claudia Delli Noci, Bruno Pavoncello and Simone Rossi also appear in supporting roles.

The film premiered in the Platform Prize program at the 2023 Toronto International Film Festival. It went into commercial release in Italy in February 2024.
