= Linetta de Castelvecchio Richardson =

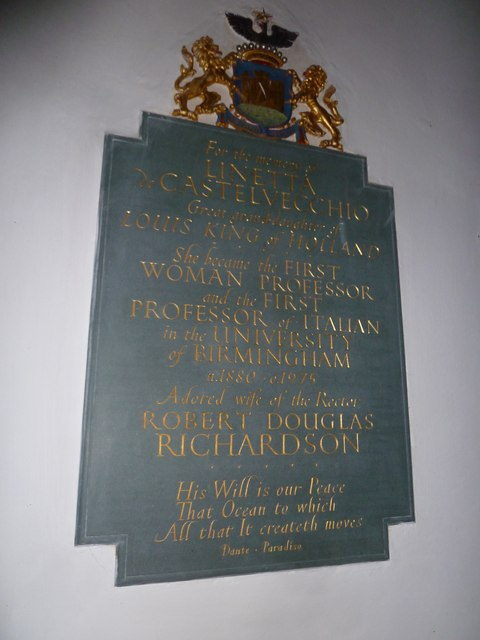
Memorial tablet to Linetta de Castelvecchio Richardson

Linetta Palamidessi de Castelvecchio Richardson (13 October 1880 – 4 June 1975) was an Italian-British scholar.

== Career ==
Having taught informally at the two women's colleges of the University of Cambridge, she was a lecturer and head of Italian Department at King's College, London from 1916 to 1921. By 1920, four new chairs in Italian were set up in England: the Serena Professorships of Italian. In June 1921, she was elected to the Serena Chair at the University of Birmingham. This made her the first woman to hold a chair at Birmingham and one of the first in Great Britain. However, there were allegations that favouritism won her the position, and the university refused to allow her to hire assistants to teach Italian from scratch while also insisting that the post was only part-time and paid her accordingly. She continued to teach at the university until she retired in 1946.

== Personal life ==
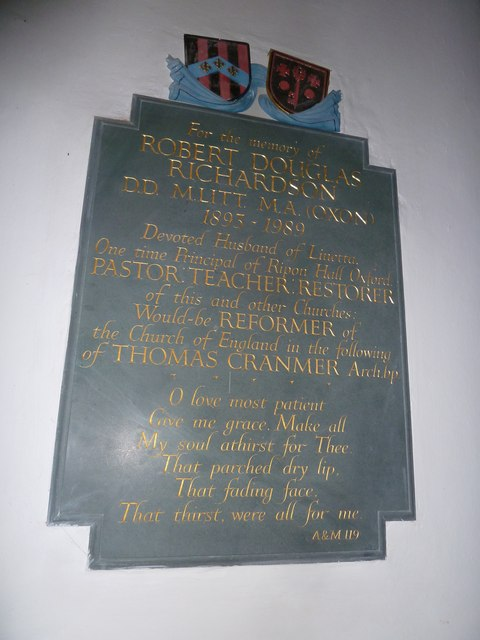
Memorial tablet by Simon Verity to Robert Douglas Richardson, husband of Linetta

Her parents were Francesco Palamidessi (1849-1891) and Joséphine Castelvecchio (1857-1932), grand-daughter of Louis Bonaparte, king of Holland.

While in London, she converted from Roman Catholicism to Anglicanism and became involved in the Churchmen's Union for the Advancement of Liberal Religious Thought.

In 1929, she married the Reverend Robert Douglas Richardson (1893–1989), an Anglican priest and academic, later a canon of Birmingham Cathedral and principal of Ripon Hall, Oxford. Her name is inscribed on a memorial to him in St Mary's Church, Boyton, Wiltshire, where he was rector from 1952 to 1967; the couple instigated restoration of the church in the 1960s.

She died at her home in Corton, near Boyton church, on 4 June 1975.

== Selected works ==
- Barzini, Luigi (1907). Pekin to Paris: an account of Prince Borgheseʹs journey across two continents in a motor-car. Translated by de Castelvecchio, L. P. London: E. Grant Richards.
