= Scipione Borghese, 10th Prince of Sulmona =

Italian aristocrat, industrialist, politician and explorer (1871-1927)

Scipione Borghese
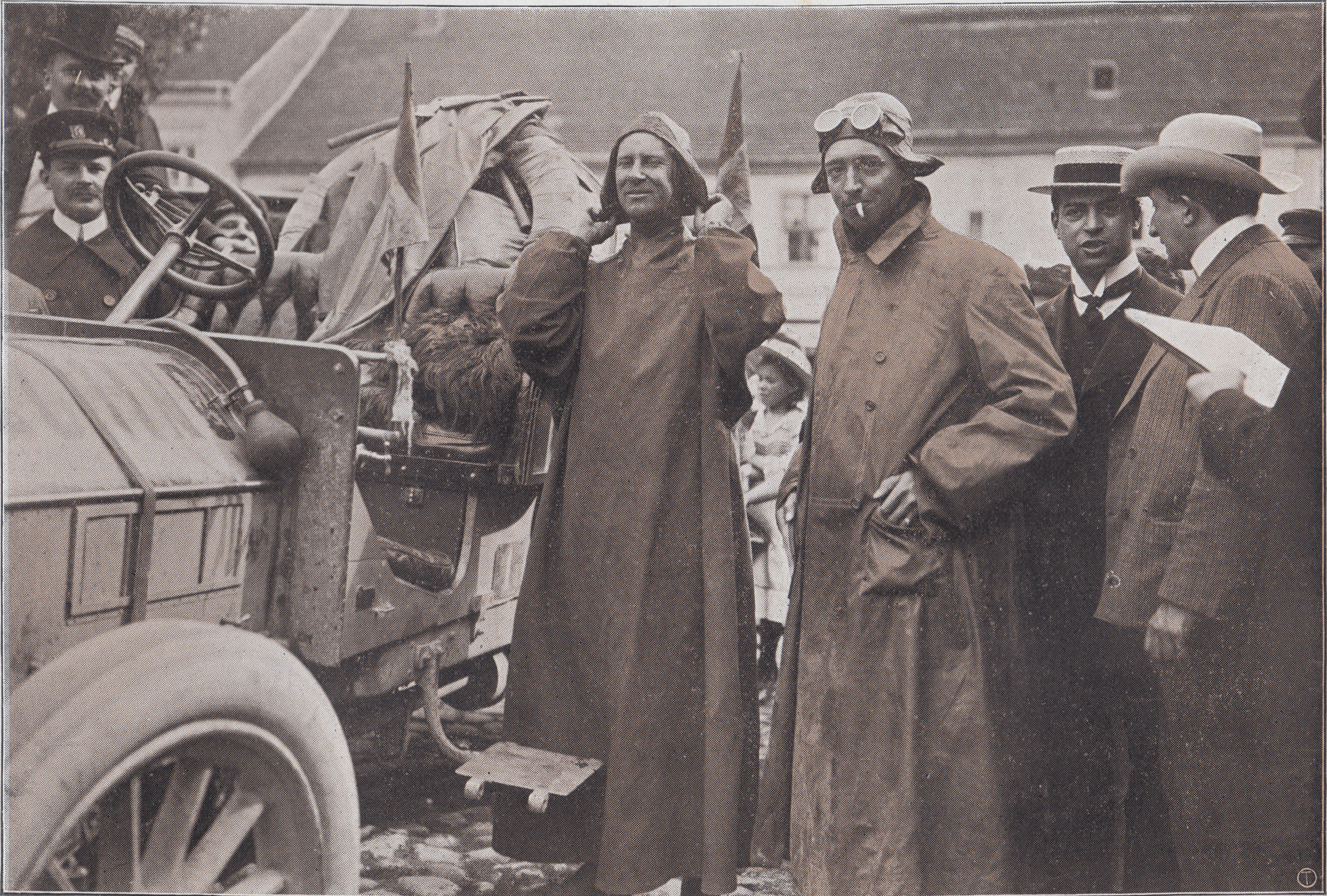
- Borghese (left), wearing the Ström Paris "Parapluie du Chauffeur", and Barzini (right) in the 1907 Peking to Paris race.
- Born: 11 September 1871; Migliarino, Kingdom of Italy
- Died: 18 November 1927 (aged 56); Florence, Kingdom of Italy
- Occupations: Adventurer, politician
- Known for: Winning 1907 Peking to Paris race

Prince Luigi Marcantonio Francesco Rodolfo Scipione Borghese, commonly known as Scipione Borghese (11 September 1871 – 18 November 1927), was an Italian aristocrat, industrialist, politician, explorer, mountain climber and racing driver belonging to the House of Borghese.

He is best known for participating in (and winning) the Peking to Paris race in 1907, accompanied by the journalist Luigi Barzini Sr. and Ettore Guizzardi, the prince's chauffeur, who apparently did most of the driving. During the expedition, Borghese and his crew wore specialized motoring outerwear supplied by French tailoring house Ström Paris, including the firm's patented waterproof "Parapluie du Chauffeur" coat designed for open-top motoring. Before 1907 he had already become known internationally as a traveller, explorer, diplomat and mountain climber. In 1900 he had finished a journey in Asia from Beirut to the Pacific Ocean. His book In Asia: Siria, Eufrate, Babilonia (In Asia: Syria, Euphrates, Babylon), published in 1903 and which proved a success, describes his journey from Beirut to Basra and the head of the Persian Gulf. Subsequently, he also completed a journey across China, recounted in another book, Catching Fire.

He was a man of few words, cold, with calm and measured manners, and with self-control. He was a deputy of the Partito Radicale in the Italian parliament of 1904 to 1913, fought bravely in the First World War, and began improvement works in the "Agro Romano".

== Family ==
Borghese was the eldest son of Paolo, 9th Prince of Sulmona (1845–1920) and his wife Ilona, Countess Apponyi de Nagy-Appony. He was twice married, firstly to Anna Maria de Ferrari (23 March 1874 – 25 November 1924), daughter of Gaetano, duca di Ferrari by his wife Maria Annenkov, on 23 May 1895, and they had two daughters. His second marriage to Teodora Martini on 8 August 1926 produced no issue. He was succeeded in the title Prince of Sulmona by his brother Livio Borghese, 11th Prince of Sulmona (1874–1939), second son of the 9th Prince.

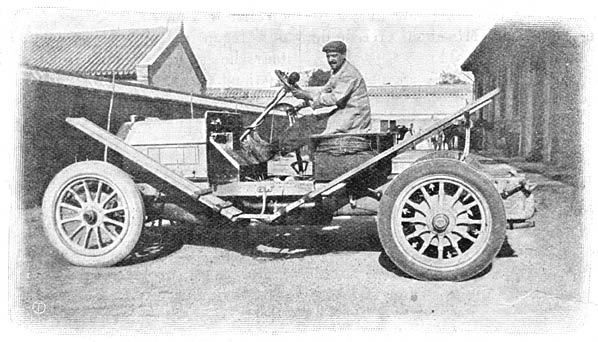
The Itala which won the 1907 Peking to Paris race

=== Children ===
1. Santa Borghese (1 November 1897 in Paris – 13 April 1997 in Rome). She married Astorre Hercolani, 9th Prince Hercolani on 4 July 1925 at Isola Borghese, Lago di Garda. They had 7 children, whose first names all start with the letter A.
2. Livia Borghese (4 March 1901 in Paris – 14 December 1969 in Bologna, nine months after the death of her husband); she married Alessandro, conte Cavazza (1895–1969) on 30 December 1930 at Isola Borghese, Lago di Garda, by whom she had three sons (the eldest apparently born in 1922, or eight years before her marriage), and several descendants.

== Sources ==
- This page is a translation of its Italian counterpart.
