= Natale a Beverly Hills =

- Directed by: Neri Parenti
- Written by: Neri Parenti; Alessandro Bencivenni; Domenico Saverni; Alessandro Pondi; Paolo Logli
- Produced by: Aurelio De Laurentiis; Luigi De Laurentiis
- Starring: Christian De Sica; Michelle Hunziker; Sabrina Ferilli; Massimo Ghini; Paolo Conticini; Gianmarco Tognazzi; Alessandro Gassmann; Emanuele Propizio; Michela Quattrociocche
- Cinematography: Daniele Massaccesi
- Edited by: Luca Montanari
- Music by: Bruno Zambrini
- Distributed by: Filmauro
- Release date: 18 December 2009
- Running time: 100 minutes
- Country: Italy
- Language: Italian
- Box office: $29,976,481

Natale a Beverly Hills (lit. 'Christmas in Beverly Hills') is a 2009 Italian Christmas comedy film directed by Neri Parenti.

== Cast ==
- Christian De Sica as Carlo
- Michelle Hunziker as Serena
- Sabrina Ferilli as Cristina
- Massimo Ghini as Aliprando
- Paolo Conticini as Claudio
- Gianmarco Tognazzi as Rocco
- Alessandro Gassmann as Marcello
- Emanuele Propizio as Lele
- Michela Quattrociocche as Susanna
- Amanda Van Annan as Janet
- Jeanene Fox as Sonia
- Jo Champa as Fiamma

== See also ==
- List of Christmas films
