= Chiara Barzini =

Italian writer (born 1979)

- Born: 1979 (age 46–47); Rome, Italy
- Education: University of California, Santa Cruz; City College of New York
- Occupation: writer
- Children: 2

Chiara Barzini (born 1979) is an Italian writer known for her semi-autobiographical novel Things that Happened Before the Earthquake set in the San Fernando Valley section of Los Angeles in the early 1990s.

== Early life and education ==
Chiara Barzini was born in 1979 in Rome, Italy, the oldest child of film director Andrea Barzini and Stephania Barzini. Her grandfather was the Italian journalist and politician Luigi Barzini Jr. and her great grandfather was the Italian war correspondent, journalist, and pro-Fascist politician Luigi Barzini Sr. When Barzini was 15 in 1994, she moved to the United States with her parents and younger brother, where the family lived in Van Nuys and she attended Van Nuys High School. When her parents moved back to Italy in 1999, Barzini stayed in California and attended the University of California, Santa Cruz. Later she moved to Brooklyn, worked in Greenwich Village as a waitress, and studied creative writing at the City College of New York.

== Career ==
Barzini has worked as a writer on films, including collaborating with Ginevra Elkann on both If Only (Magari) and I Told You So (Te l’avevo detto). She has written short stories and magazine articles, and in 2017 published her first novel, Things that Happened Before the Earthquake, a coming of age roman a clef narrative set in the San Fernando Valley in the early 1990s. The novel, which received positive reviews from newspapers and magazines such as the New York Times and Vogue, is currently being adapted as a film by Robert Zemeckis. She has been published in a wide variety of magazines including Noon, Bomb Magazine, the New Review of Literature, the Village Voice, Rolling Stone Italy, Italian Vanity Fair, and Marie Claire.

Barzini's non-fiction book, Aqua: A Story Of Water And Lost Dreams was published by Canongate Books in October 2025. One reviewer called it "timely and excellent," "brilliant," and "a modern day parable." Another describes it as the "fascinating" and "impassioned" story of how "William Mulholland transformed an unimportant desert town into the city of angels", and a warning "that LA might dry up again."

== Awards ==
In 2019 Barzini won the San Fernando Valley Award for Fiction from the Friends of the Library at California State University, Northridge.

== Personal life ==
Barzini's partner is Luca Infascelli. She has two children, Sebastiano and Anita. Barzini's aunt is the Italian actress and model Benedetta Barzini.
