= Luigi Barzini Jr. =

Italian journalist and writer (1908–1984)

- Barzini in 1962

Member of the Italian Chamber of Deputies
- In office 12 June 1958 – 24 May 1972
- Constituency: Milan

Personal details
- Born: 21 December 1908 Milan, Italy
- Died: 30 March 1984 (aged 75) Rome, Italy
- Party: Italian Liberal Party
- Spouse(s): Giannalisa Feltrinelli (m. 1940; div. 1947) Paola Gadola (m. 1950)
- Children: 5, including Benedetta and Andrea
- Parent(s): Luigi Barzini Sr. (father); Emma Pesavento (mother)
- Profession: Journalist, writer

Luigi Barzini Jr. (21 December 1908 – 30 March 1984) was an Italian journalist, writer and politician most famous for his 1964 book The Italians, delving deeply into the Italian national character and introducing many English and German speaking readers to Italian life and culture.

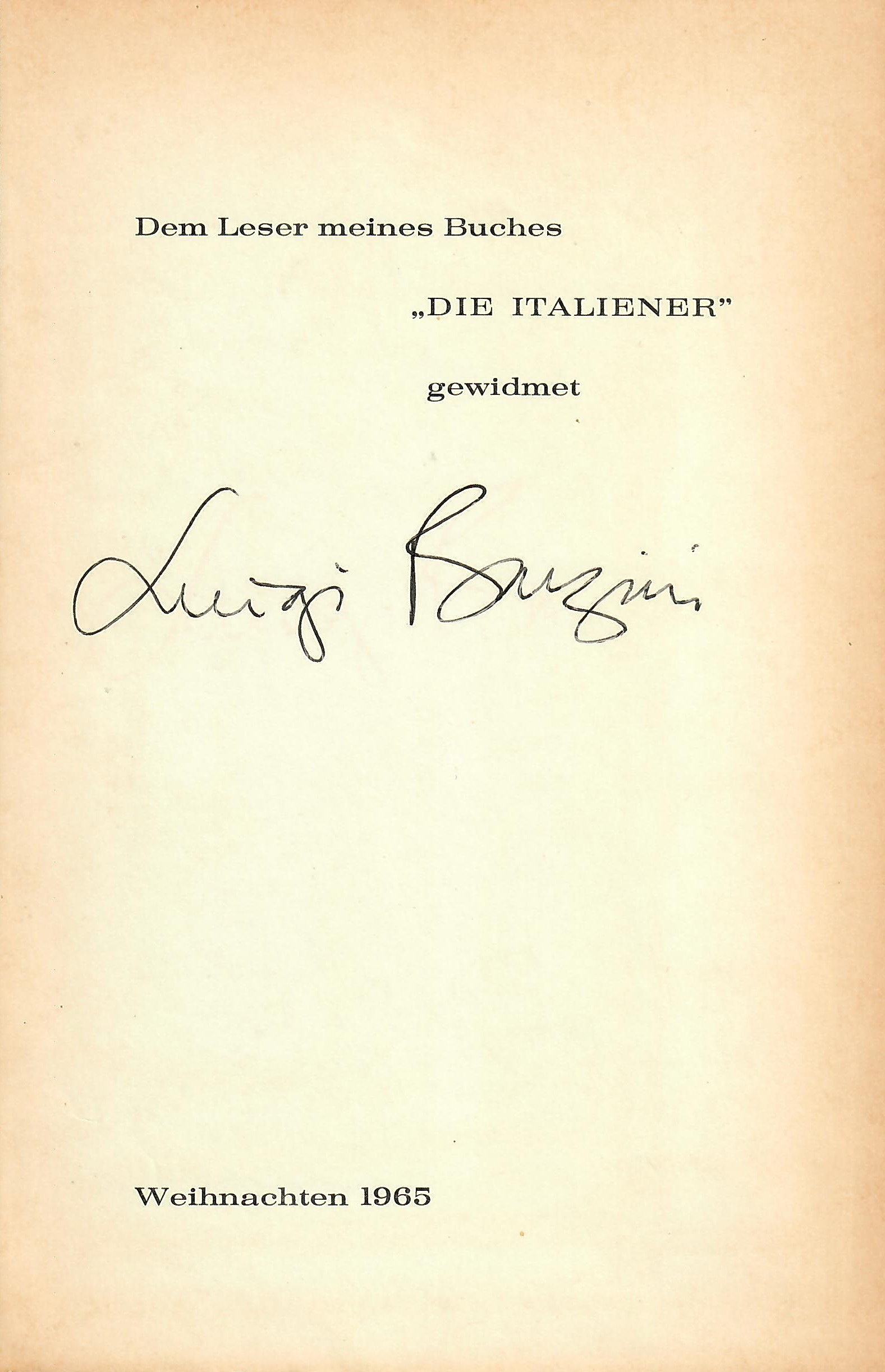
Inscription in the German edition of: "The Italiens", 1965 (Riemann Archives)

== Early life ==
Barzini junior was born in Milan, Lombardy, the son of Luigi Barzini Sr., a famous journalist. In the 1920s, his father left the Corriere della Sera and moved to the United States, where he directed the Italian-American newspaper Corriere d'America from 1923 to 1931.

After completing his studies in Italy and at Columbia University, Barzini Jr. worked for two New York newspapers, including the New York World. In 1928, together with Richard Washburn Child, former Ambassador to Italy and a supporter of Benito Mussolini, he ghostwrote The Autobiography of Benito Mussolini. He returned to Italy in 1930 to become a correspondent for Corriere della Sera.

His father, who was made senator in 1934, had pro-Fascist sentiments and had access to highest political circles of Benito Mussolini's Fascist regime. Luigi Jr., however, frequently associated with the younger generation of fascists around Galeazzo Ciano, the Italian Minister of Foreign Affairs and Mussolini's son-in-law.

== Panay incident ==
As the Corriere della Sera Asian correspondent, he went to China. On 11 December 1937, he was aboard the USS Panay on the Yangtze Patrol in Nanking at the prompting of George Atcheson, a U.S. Embassy official. Also aboard were Universal News cameraman Norman Alley, Movietone News' Eric Mayell, the New York Times's Norman Soong, Collier's Weekly correspondent Jim Marshall, and La Stampa correspondent Sandro Sandri (it). Atcheson had invited them aboard the Panay so that they could document the fall of the city from relative safety. The four journalists had been covering the ongoing Japanese invasion of China in the mid-1930s, and found themselves in the thick of things in early December 1937 as Japanese forces moved on Nanking.

According to Alley, writing in his memoir I Witness, Atcheson proclaimed that aboard the gunboat the group would be "as safe as you would be on good old American soil." Little did any of them know that in just a week's time, the Panay would be attacked and sunk, Sandri killed, and that they would witness the Rape of Nanking.

During the attack Barzini, although wounded, performed heroically helping to bring the wounded ashore and providing first aid to the best of his ability. As Sandri, known as "the Floyd Gibbons of Italy," was stretched out in the reeds with excruciatingly painful, fatal stomach wounds, Barzini could only comfort him with an occasional cigarette and a word from time to time. This episode of the incident was captured on Alley's and Mayell's cameras and in a 1937 Wide World Photos shot titled "Consoling dying Panay victim".

== Banned by the Fascists ==
In April 1940, he was arrested on charges of leaking confidential information to the enemy and making disparaging remarks about Mussolini. He was confined by the Fascists to forced residence in a village for five years. In 1944, when Rome was liberated, he returned to journalism.

== Journalism ==
In 1944, he resumed his journalistic career as the editor-in-chief of daily and weekly publications. He founded Il Globo. Subsequently, he served in turn as the chief editor of several newspapers and magazines.

== Parliamentarian ==
A staunch anti-Communist, he was a member of the Italian Chamber of Deputies from 1958 to 1972, for the centre-right Italian Liberal Party (Partito Liberale Italiano – PLI).

== Later life and family ==
He was the father of five children, and lived on a small farm near Rome, where he produced his own olive oil, wine, vegetables, and fruit. Barzini died in 1984 of cancer at his home in Rome. His son is the filmmaker Andrea Barzini and his granddaughter is the writer Chiara Barzini. His daughter Benedetta, by his first wife Giannalisa Feltrinelli, was a successful fashion model during the 1960s. His marriage to Feltrinelli also made him the stepfather of Italian publisher and left-wing political activist Giangiacomo Feltrinelli, of whom Barzini eventually disapproved, saying that he thought Giangiacomo preferred the company of men who "despised the masses as he did, who thought them something they could play with." Barzini also rejected as implausible conspiracy theories concerning Giangiacomo's death.

== Works ==
- Americans are Alone in the World (1953)
- The Italians (1964)
  - Die Italiener, German Edition, Publisher: Heinrich Scheffler GmbH & Co., Frankfurt a. M. (1965)
- From Caesar to the Mafia: Sketches of Italian Life (1971)
- O, America! (1977); US title: O America: When You and I Were Young
- The Impossible Europeans (1983); US title: The Europeans

== Bibliography ==
- D'Agostino, Peter R. (2004). Rome in America. Transnational Catholic Ideology from the Risorgimento to Fascism, Chapell Hill (NC): University of North Carolina Press, ISBN 0-8078-5515-4
- Sarti, Roland (ed.) (2004). Italy: a reference guide from the Renaissance to the present, Infobase Publishing, ISBN 0-8160-4522-4
