= Federico Moccia =

Italian writer, screenwriter and film director

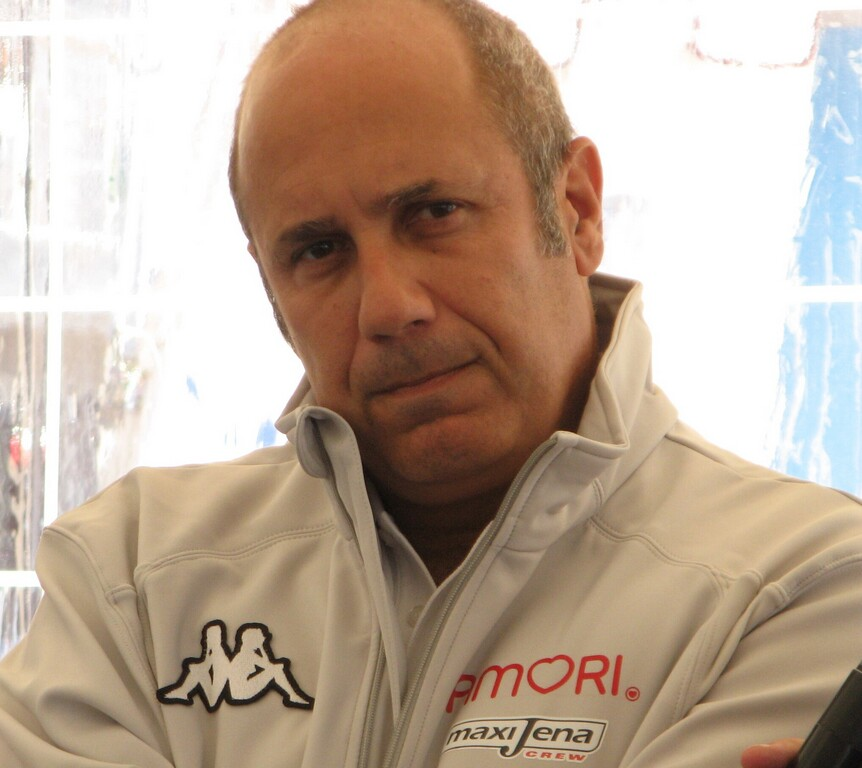
Federico Moccia

Federico Moccia (born 20 July 1963) is an Italian writer, screenwriter and film director. His father Giuseppe Moccia was also a screenwriter and director. Following his successful book and film I Want You many people put love padlocks on Ponte Milvio in Rome and other places around the world. From 2011 until 2027 he has been the mayor of Rosello, a town in Abruzzo.

== Biography ==
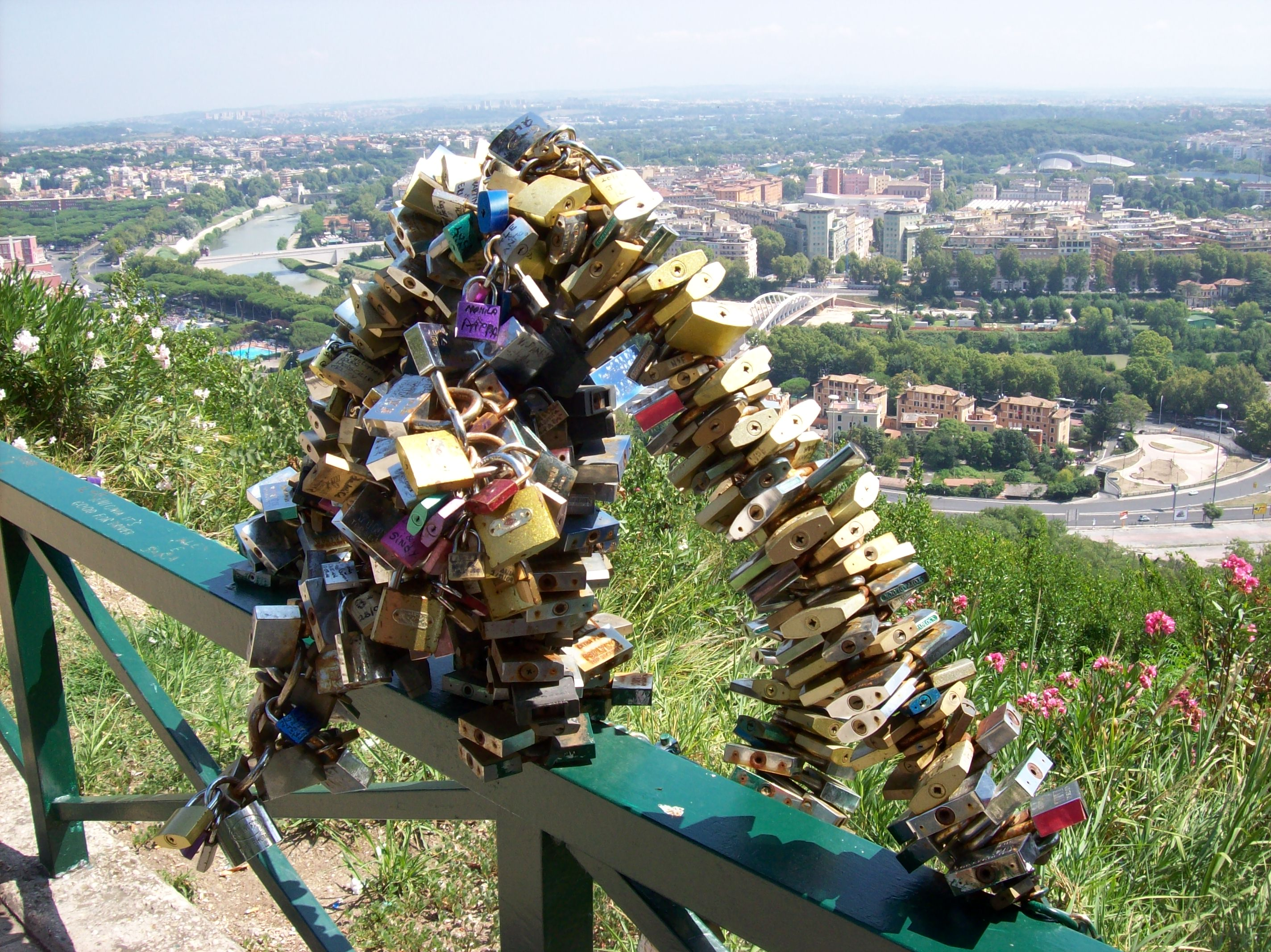
The "love padlocks" in Rome

He is the son of Italian scriptwriter and movie director Giuseppe Moccia, and his childhood was linked to the world of cinema through his father, which he wrote about in several Italian comedies of the 1970s and 1980s. It started in the world of work from his father at age 19 as assistant director Attila flagello di Dio (1982). Five years later he directed his first film, Palla al centro, but his lack of success led Moccia to write screenplays and direct several series.

In 1992 he wrote his first novel Three Meters Above Heaven which was rejected by several publishers and released in a small edition by Il Ventaglio publishing house. In 1996, again without success, he wrote and directed the film Classe mista 3ª A and returned to the world of television. In 2004, twelve years after its first edition, Three Meters Above Heaven had a reissue, becoming a bestseller and leading to a movie of the same title, also receiving several awards and translations into several languages (also Portuguese and Japanese).

In 2006 he published I Want You, sequel to the previous novel, which was so successful that it was decided, again, to adapt it to film. Something similar happened with Sorry but I Call You Love (2007), prequel of Sorry but I Want to Marry You (2009) whose premiere was in 2010.

In 2017 he wrote Three Times You which was the last book of the series of Three Meters Above Heaven. Summertime, a TV show based on the same series, premiered on Netflix in 2020.

He considers himself Roman Catholic.

== Selected bibliography ==
- Tre metri sopra il cielo (in Italian), (1992)
- Ho voglia di te (in Italian), (2006; English: I Want You)
- Scusa ma ti chiamo amore (in Italian), (2007)
- Cercasi Niki disperatamente (in Italian), (2007)
- Amore 14 (in Italian), (2008)
- Scusa ma ti voglio sposare (in Italian), (2009)

== Films ==
Director

- Palla al centro (1987)
- College (1990)
- Classe mista 3ª A (1996)
- Scusa ma ti chiamo amore (2008), based on his novel of the same name
- Amore 14 (2009), based on his novel of the same name
- Sorry If I Want to Marry You (2010), based on his novel of the same name
- Universitari (2013)
- Non c'è campo (2017)

Screenwriter

- I ragazzi della 3ª C (1987-1989) – TV series
- Cannibal Holocaust II (1988)
- College (1990) – TV series
- Tre metri sopra il cielo (2004)
- Ho voglia di te (2006)
- Scusa ma ti chiamo amore (2008)
- Scusa ma ti voglio sposare (2009)
- Amore 14 (2010)
- Universitari (2013)
- Non c'è campo (2017)
