= Luigi Barzini Sr. =

Italian journalist (1874–1947)

The Honourable Luigi Barzini Sr. OCI, LH
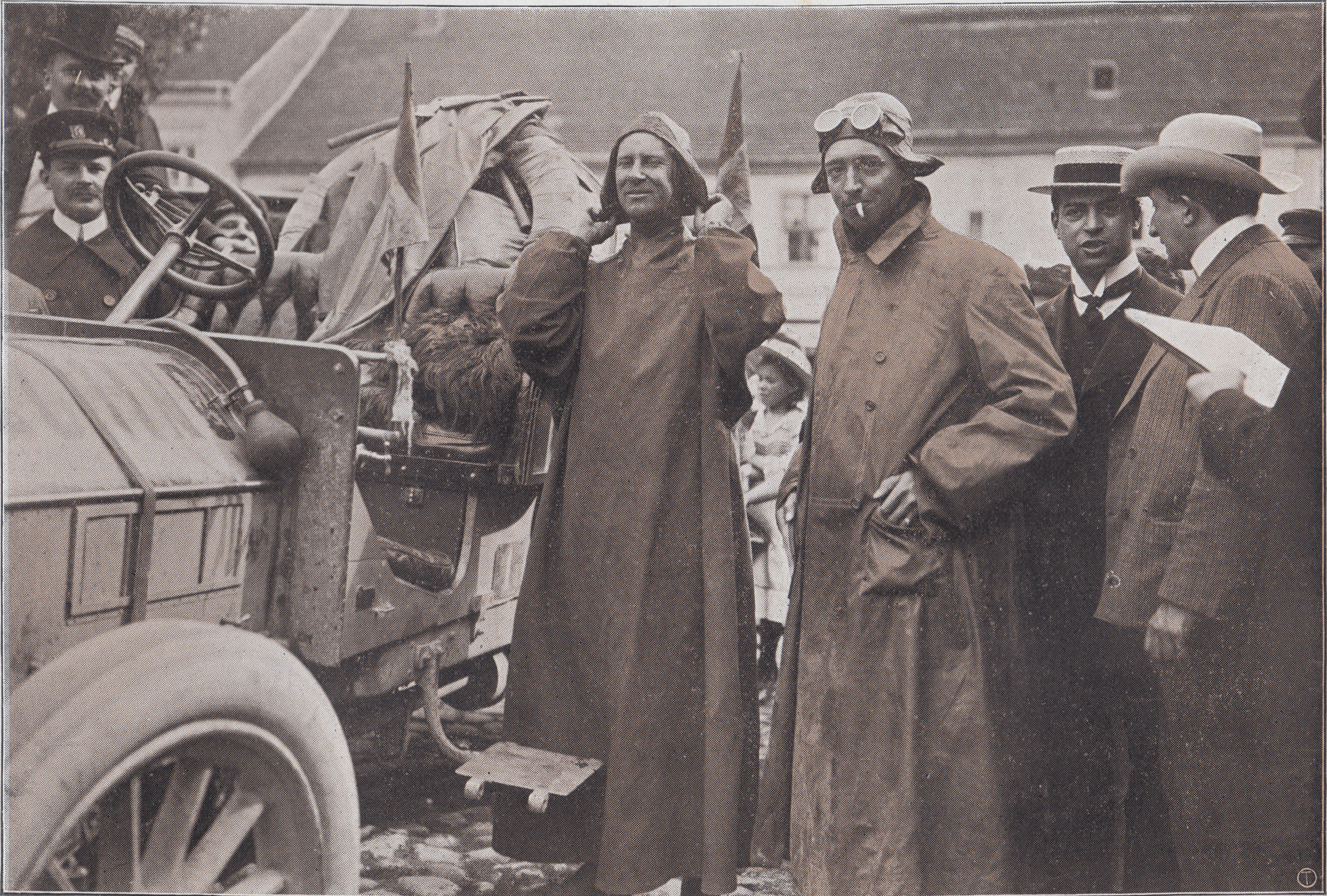
- Borghese (left) and Barzini (right) in the Peking to Paris race.

Member of the Italian Senate
- In office 28 April 1934 – 5 April 1945
- Constituency: Milan

Personal details
- Born: February 7, 1874 Orvieto, Italy
- Died: September 6, 1947 (aged 73) Milan, Italy
- Party: National Fascist Party
- Spouse(s): Mantica Pesavento (m. 1890–1941); her death
- Children: Emma; Luigi Jr. Ettore; Ugo
- Profession: Journalist

Luigi Barzini Sr. (February 7, 1874 – September 6, 1947) in Orvieto, son of Ettore Barzini and Maria Bartoccini, was an Italian Senator and the most noted journalist and war correspondent of the second half of the Italian Belle Époque. Barzini began writing for small Italian magazines in 1898 and was shortly after hired by Corriere della Sera to report on the Boxer Rebellion in China. He became a prominent journalist and was an official correspondent with the Italian Army during World War I.

Barzini was a supporter of the fascist regime in Italy, but his career was damaged after Italian dictator Benito Mussolini mistakenly believed him to have written an anti-fascist article. After the collapse of the fascist regime in 1945, Barzini was barred from practicing journalism. He died impoverished in Milan in 1947.

== Work Life ==
Barzini started his career as a journalist in 1898, working for minor Italian magazines and was almost immediately noticed and hired by Luigi Albertini, then director of the Corriere della Sera, the most prestigious Italian newspaper. In 1900, he was sent as war correspondent to Qing Dynasty China, where he witnessed and reported about the Boxer Rebellion, distinguishing himself for his ability to get first hand information. During the Russo-Japanese War of 1904–1905, he was embedded within the Imperial Japanese Army, and covered its campaigns in Manchuria.

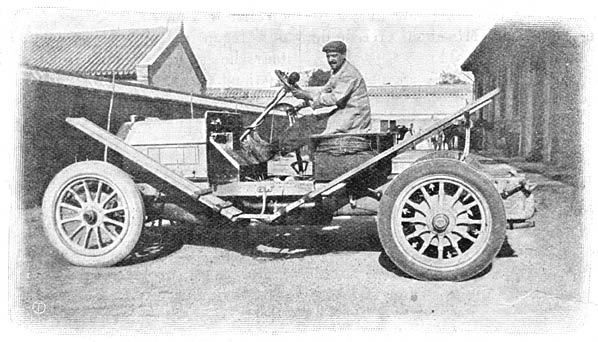
The Itala which won the 1907 Peking to Paris race

As a journalist of the Corriere della Sera, in 1907 he accompanied Prince Scipione Borghese in the famous Peking to Paris motor race, winning it after a journey of two months in an Itala car across China and Siberia, traveling amongst regions and people that had never seen a car before. Of this adventure, he left a wonderful memoir, filled with hundreds of photographs, in his book Peking to Paris, that was published in 1908 in eleven different languages: a "publishing raid", as his proud Italian editor noted in the preface of the book.

During World War I, Barzini was the official correspondent with the Italian Army; an account of his experiences was published in The War Illustrated. In 1921, Barzini reported exclusively for the Corriere della Sera on the Bolzano Bloody Sunday. Soon after, he left the Corriere and moved to the United States, where he directed the Italian-American newspaper Corriere d'America from 1923 until his return to Italy in 1931. In 1932 he became director of the Il Mattino, but in 1933 lost his position when Mussolini mistakenly thought him to be the author of a critical article appeared in the French press. The misunderstanding was soon cleared but Barzini had no further chances to direct a newspaper. After the nomination as senator, he continued to work as a correspondent for the Fascist newspaper Il Popolo d'Italia, covering the Spanish Civil War and the Russian Invasion.

== Barzini and Fascism ==
Barzini had pro-Fascist sentiments since before Mussolini's rise to power. He signed his name on the Manifesto of the Fascist Intellectuals in 1925, and was made a senator in 1934, serving on the Commission of the Armed Forces (April 17, 1939 – February 11, 1941), the Committee on Foreign Affairs, Trade and Customs legislation (December 31, 1941 – February 12, 1943 and June 16 to August 5, 1943), Affairs Committee of Italian Africa (April 15, 1942 – June 16, 1943) and the Board of Finance (February 12 to June 16, 1943). He continued to collaborate with Mussolini in the Italian Social Republic, where he directed the official press agency Agenzia Stefani. In 1945, he was convicted for his involvement in the Fascist regime and forbidden to practice the profession of journalist.

== Death and family ==
Barzini died destitute in Milan in 1947. He had four children: Emma, Luigi Jr., Ettore, and Ugo. His son, Luigi Barzini, Jr. was also a journalist and writer and became widely known for his 1964 book "The Italians". His son Ettore, after joining the communist Patriotic Action Groups, was arrested in 1943 and deported to a concentration camp in Germany where he died in 1945, despite his father's efforts to save his life.

== Works ==
- Nell'Estremo Oriente. Milano, Libreria Editrice Nazionale, 1904
- Il Giappone in armi. Milano, Libreria Editrice Lombarda, 1906
- Guerra Russo-Giapponese. La battaglia di Mukden, 1907
- La metà del mondo vista da un automobile – da Pechino a Parigi in 60 giorni, prima edizione. Milano, Ulrico Hoepli Editore, 1908
  - Barzini, Luigi (1907). Pekin to Paris: an account of Prince Borgheseʹs journey across two continents in a motor-car. Translated by de Castelvecchio, L. P. London: E. Grant Richards.
- Scene della grande guerra, 1915
- Al Fronte, 1915
- La guerra d'Italia. Sui monti, nel cielo e nel mare, 1916
- La guerra d'Italia. Dal Trentino al Carso, 1917
- Impressioni boreali, 1921
- Dall'impero del Mikado all'impero dello Zar, 1935
- Sotto la tenda, 1935
- U.R.S.S. L'impero del lavoro forzato, Ulrico Hoepli Editore, 1938
- Evasione in Mongolia, 1939
- Wu Wang ed altre genti, 1941
- Roosevelt e la guerra all'Inghilterra. Commenti e spiegazioni, Mondadori, 1942

== Awards ==
- Commander of the Order of the Crown of Italy, February 17, 1924
- Grand Officer of the Order of the Crown of Italy, April 16, 1925
- Grand Officer of the Colonial Order of the Star of Italy
- Knight of the Legion of Honour (France)
- Croce di Guerra
- Medaglia di bronzo al valor militare
