= Guzzanti =

Guzzanti is a surname of Italian origin. It may refer to:

- Elio Guzzanti (1920–2014), Italian academic and politician; uncle of Paolo
- Paolo Guzzanti (b. 1940), Italian journalist and politician; father of Corrado, Sabina and Caterina
- Sabina Guzzanti (b. 1963), Italian actress and satirist; daughter of Paolo
- Corrado Guzzanti (b. 1965), Italian actor, director, writer and satirist; son of Paolo
- Caterina Guzzanti (b. 1976), Italian actress and satirist; daughter of Paolo
