= Boris (TV series) =

Italian television series

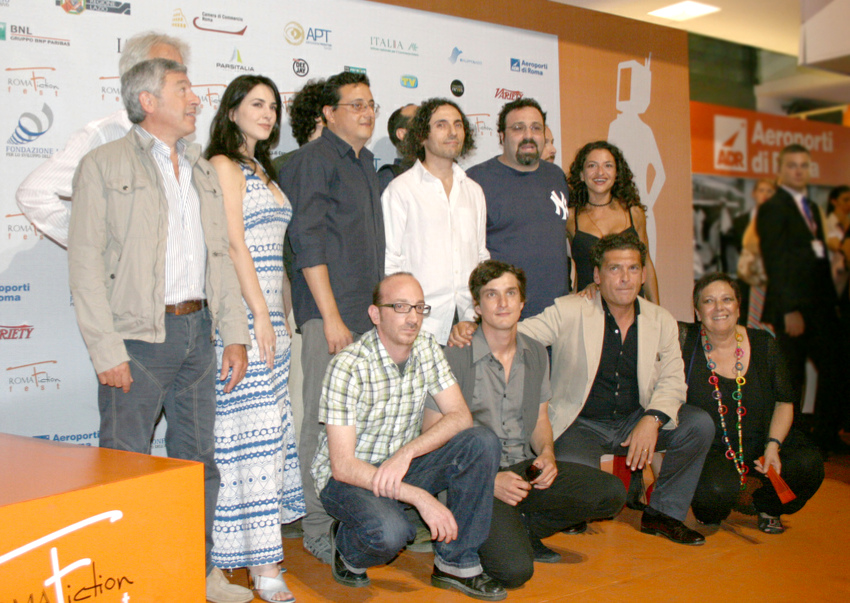
- Cast of Boris
- Genre: Comedy; Satire; Sitcom
- Created by: Luca Manzi; Carlo Mazzotta
- Directed by: Giacomo Ciarrapico; Mattia Torre; Luca Vendruscolo; Davide Marengo
- Starring: Alessandro Tiberi; Carolina Crescentini; Caterina Guzzanti; Roberta Fiorentini; Ilaria Stivali; Pietro Sermonti; Francesco Pannofino; Antonio Catania; Ninni Bruschetta; Paolo Calabresi; Alberto Di Stasio; Carlo De Ruggeri; Karin Proia; Eugenia Costantini; Luca Amorosino; Angelica Leo; Valerio Aprea; Massimo De Lorenzo; Andrea Sartoretti; Giorgio Tirabassi; Aurora Calabresi; Andrea Lintozzi
- Theme music composer: Elio e Le Storie Tese
- Opening theme: "Gli occhi del cuore"
- Composers: Giuliano Taviani; Carmelo Travia
- Country of origin: Italy
- Original language: Italian
- No. of seasons: 4
- No. of episodes: 50

Production
- Producer: Lorenzo Mieli

Original release
- Network: Fox International Channels Italy
- Release: April 17, 2007 – April 12, 2010
- Network: Star
- Release: October 26 – October 26, 2022

Related
- Boris: The Film

Boris is an Italian satirical comedy television series created by Luca Manzi and Carlo Mazzotta, initially produced from 2007 to 2010, with a revival season that premiered in 2022.

Boris brings to the stage the behind-the-scenes of a television set where a troupe is shooting Gli occhi del cuore 2 (The eyes of the heart 2), a satirical portrait of the many dramas airing on Italian TV networks. The series consists of 3 seasons and a movie for the cinema, Boris: The Film, released in 2011. The series first aired in Italy on satellite channels FOX and FX, and subsequently on Cielo and Rai 3.

After an eleven-year hiatus, a revival was produced for Disney+ in 2022. The series is now on Star with an English dub.

== Premise ==
Alessandro is a young man eager to enter the world of film and television industry. His dream seems to come true when he lands an internship on the set of the TV drama Gli occhi del cuore 2. However, he quickly realizes that television is nothing like he imagined. From day one, he's surrounded by eccentric and dysfunctional characters.

The production is led by the disillusioned director René Ferretti, who always carries his goldfish, Boris, with him. René has long given up on artistic ambitions and now works on low-quality shows, which he openly admits are shot "like total crap". The lead actor, Stanis La Rochelle, is a mediocre performer who acts like a Hollywood star and constantly complains about traditional Italian acting. The female lead, Corinna Negri, is completely talentless. Arianna, the assistant director, is the only one who tries to keep things under control and genuinely supports Alessandro.

The crew includes: Augusto Biascica, the grumpy head electrician; Duccio Patané, the drug-addicted director of photography who has worked with René for years; Itala, the lazy script supervisor hired through connections; Gloria, the makeup artist; Lorenzo, another intern who is bullied by Biascica; Sergio Vannucci, the production manager obsessed with cutting costs; and Diego Lopez, the network executive trying to balance public taste with political interference. Away from the set, the three unnamed scriptwriters are lazy, unmotivated, and only interested in making money, constantly writing absurd and unrealistic plots.

Over time, the cast expands to include new characters like Cristina Avola-Burkstaller, a spoiled rich girl brought in to replace Corinna; Nando Martellone, a trivial comedian; Karin, a voluptuous actress; and Fabiana, René's talented young daughter.

== Production ==
Boris began filming its first season in early 2007, marking the first original series produced by Wilder for Fox International Channels Italy. Initially titled Sampras, the name had to be changed due to potential legal issues with Nike, which held the rights to the name. Based on a concept by Luca Manzi and Carlo Mazzotta, the show was written by Giacomo Ciarrapico, Mattia Torre, and Luca Vendruscolo, who also directed the first season. The pilot episode was previewed in the "Extra" section at the 2006 Rome Film Festival. The series aired between April and July 2007. On September 11 of that year, Fox aired Gli occhi di Boris: Backstage, a behind-the-scenes special featuring bloopers, unseen footage, and cast interviews.

Although the show initially reached a limited audience due to its broadcast on satellite TV, Boris quickly became a cult hit in Italian television. Many of its quotes and references entered everyday language, thanks largely to strong word of mouth—and, paradoxically, to online piracy, which helped the show gain wider exposure and build a devoted fanbase.

Filming for season two began on 14 February 2008, and included appearances by comedian Corrado Guzzanti and various guest stars. This season premiered on Fox on 12 May 2008. The direction was shared between Vendruscolo, Ciarrapico, and Torre.

Production for the third season—initially planned as the last—started in mid-July 2009 and lasted around 12 weeks. It aired from 1 March 2010, on the FX channel. The first three episodes were previewed at a special event at the Teatro Palladium in Rome, and the first two had also been screened at the Bari International Film Festival. For this season, directing was handed over to Davide Marengo.

The show remained unavailable on free-to-air television for over two years. Although rumors of a possible broadcast on Rai 3 surfaced in early 2008, they remained unconfirmed until 2011, when the network officially picked up the series. In the meantime, Boris made its free-to-air debut on 18 December 2009, on the Cielo channel, which went on to air all three seasons within a few months.

On 1 April 2011, the feature film Boris: The Film was released in theaters, serving as a continuation of the events of the third season and providing a new ending to the story.

After much speculation, and 11 years after the last season, a fourth season was officially announced on 16 February 2021, during the press conference for the launch of the "Star" section on Disney+. The new season, released as a Star Original, consists of eight episodes, each lasting 30 minutes. During the announcement, the return of the original cast was confirmed, this time navigating the world of streaming and social media platforms. The season was produced by Lorenzo Mieli for The Apartment, a Fremantle company. Filming took place between October and December of the same year. The series was released on Disney+ on 26 October 2022.

== Characters ==
Character	Portrayed by	Season			
Character	Portrayed by	1	2	3	4
Main characters
Alessandro	Alessandro Tiberi	Main	Main	Main	Main
René Ferretti	Francesco Pannofino	Main	Main	Main	Main
Arianna Dell'Arti	Caterina Guzzanti	Main	Main	Main	Main
Stanis La Rochelle	Pietro Sermonti	Main	Main	Main	Main
Corinna Negri	Carolina Crescentini	Main	Guest	Guest	Main
Itala	Roberta Fiorentini	Main	Main	Main	
Duccio Patanè	Ninni Bruschetta	Main	Main	Main	Main
Augusto Biascica	Paolo Calabresi	Main	Main	Main	Main
Diego Lopez	Antonio Catania	Main	Main	Main	Main
Sergio Vannucci	Alberto Di Stasio	Main	Main	Main	Main
Lorenzo	Carlo De Ruggieri	Main	Main	Main	Main
Gloria Spalloni	Ilaria Stivali	Main	Recurring	Guest	
Alfredo Rocchi	Luca Amorosino	Recurring	Main	Main	Main
Screenwriter 1	Valerio Aprea	Recurring	Recurring	Main	Main
Screenwriter 2	Massimo De Lorenzo	Recurring	Recurring	Main	Main
Screenwriter 3	Andrea Sartoretti	Recurring	Recurring	Main	Main
Cristina Avola-Burkstaller	Eugenia Costantini		Main	Guest	Recurring
Karin	Karin Proia		Main	Guest	Recurring
Fabiana Hassler	Angelica Leo			Main	Guest
Lalla	Anna Calabresi				Main
Fabio	Andrea Lintozzi				Main

Character	Portrayed by	Season			
Character	Portrayed by	1	2	3	4
Supporting characters
Dr. Cane	Arnaldo Ninchi	Recurring	Recurring	Recurring	
Nando Martellone	Massimiliano Bruno	Recurring	Guest	Recurring	Recurring
Elena	Margot Sikabonyi	Recurring	Guest		
Orlando Serpentieri	Roberto Herlitzka	Recurring			
Ada De Silvestri	Gianna Paola Scaffidi	Recurring			
Glauco Benetti	Giorgio Tirabassi	Guest	Guest	Guest	Recurring
Furio	Raffaele Buranelli	Guest			Recurring
Guido	Lucio Patanè	Guest			Recurring
Ana Canestri	Cecilia Dazzi	Guest			Guest
Mariano Giusti	Corrado Guzzanti		Recurring		Recurring
Father Gabrielli	Corrado Guzzanti		Recurring		
The grip	Simone Arrighi		Recurring		
The camera operator	Alessio Piretti		Recurring		
The production guy	Alessandro Bonaccorso		Recurring		
Tino Tini	Giulio Ferretto		Recurring		
The psychoanalyst	Emanuela Grimalda		Recurring		
The make-up artist	Eleonora Turco		Recurring		
Beatrice Di Mauro	Giulia Mombelli		Recurring		
Sandroni	Antonello Grimaldi		Recurring		
Tarzanetto	Tommaso Accardo		Recurring		
Kalemzuck	Andrea Purgatori		Guest		Recurring
Claudio	Michele Alhaique			Recurring	
Dr. Mulè	Sylvia De Fanti			Recurring	
Valerio Zanetti	Marco Giallini			Recurring	
Remo Arcangeli	Massimo De Francovich			Recurring	
Laura	Astrid Casali				Recurring
Allison	Emma Lo Bianco				Recurring
Carlo	Giordano De Plano				Recurring
Filippo	Jerry Mastrodomenico				Recurring
Mario	Maurizio Pepe				Recurring
Cousin Michele	Giuseppe Piromalli				Recurring
Manuela	Nina Torresi				Recurring
Angelo	Alessio Praticò				Recurring
Tatti Barletta	Edoardo Pesce				Recurring
Giulia	Giulia Anchisi				Recurring

=== Guest ===
This list includes only notable guest stars who appeared in a single episode or in a two-part episode.

- Pietro De Silva as Gioacchino Panè (season 1)
- Niccolò Senni as Fabio (season 1)
- Sergio Fiorentini as Mario La Rochelle (season 1)
- Luisa Ranieri as Verena (season 1)
- Barbara Folchitto as the journalist (season 1)
- Valerio Mastandrea as the auditioning actor (season 1)
- Orfeo Orlando as Albino Corradi (season 1)
- Thierno Thiam as Amadou (season 2)
- Esther Elisha as Natalie (season 2)
- Daniele Blando as Er Colla (season 2)
- Trio Medusa as the hosts of La casa senza bagno (season 2)
- Claudio Parise as Pinuccio (season 2)
- Michela Bozzini as Nadia (season 2)
- Franco Ravera as Ermanno Lenzi (season 2)
- Giancarlo Judica Cordiglia as Amedeo Rocchi (season 2)
- Anna Cicatiello as Samantha Franchini (season 2)
- Fulvio Falzarano as Raul (season 3)
- Lavinia Longhi as Maddalena (season 3)
- Christian Ginepro as Benedetto (season 3)
- Fabrizio Buompastore as Ciccio Sultano (season 3)
- Francesco Maria Cordella as Giuseppe Locomotiva (season 3)
- Daniela Terreri as Antonietta Locomotiva (season 3)
- Augusto Fornari as Paco Revelli (season 3)
- Renato Marzi as Alfonso Chiavinmano (season 3)
- Maddalena Ferrara as an escort (season 3)
- Stefano Ambrogi as the Lupo Film producer (season 3)
- Valentina Lodovini as Jasmine (season 3)
- Filippo Timi as Bruno Staffa (season 3)
- Kevin Notsa Miakouang as Tyron (season 3)
- Josafat Vagni as Selletta (season 3)
- Teresa Piergentili as the actress playing the notary's mother (season 3)
- Fabrizio Accatino as the Roma Fiction Fest host (season 3)
- Alessandro Mannarino as the actor playing a nurse (season 3)
- Jane Alexander as a spectator at the festival (season 3)
- Alessia Reggio as the old homeowner (season 3)
- Laura Morante as a housewife (season 3)
- Alexandra Filotei as the drug addict (season 3)
- Sergio Brio as himself (season 3)
- Paolo Sorrentino as himself (season 3)
- Walter Veltroni as himself (season 4)
- Eric Alexander as Gregor (season 4)
- Cristina Pellegrino as Elisabetta (season 4)
- Lem Teku as Samara (season 4)
- Taiyo Yamanouchi as Taiyo (season 4)
- Heidrun Schleef as the Platform's attorney (season 4)
- Fabrizio Gifuni as Pierfrancesco Favino disguised as Gifuni (season 4)

== Episodes ==
Series	Episodes	Originally released	
Series	Episodes	First released	Last released
1	14	16 April 2007	9 July 2007
2	14	12 May 2008	28 July 2008
3	14	1 March 2010	12 April 2010
4	8	26 October 2022	

=== Season 1 (2007) ===
No. overall	No. in season	Title	Directed by	Written by	Original release date
1	1	"Il mio primo giorno"	Luca Vendruscolo	Giacomo Ciarrapico, Mattia Torre, Luca Vendruscolo	16 April 2007
Alessandro, a directing intern, starts work on the set of Gli occhi del cuore 2. He meets a chaotic crew: the frustrated director René, strict assistant Arianna, drug-addicted cinematographer Duccio, arrogant actor Stanis, and untalented diva Corinna. Corinna refuses to say her age in a scene, but René tricks her by making her believe Alessandro is a renowned critic.
2	2	"L'anello del conte"	Luca Vendruscolo	Giacomo Ciarrapico, Mattia Torre, Luca Vendruscolo	16 April 2007
Sergio, the production manager, makes Alessandro sign pre-dated resignation papers and fake checks. Veteran actor Orlando Serpentieri joins the cast. Despite not knowing the script, he acts better than everyone else. René asks him to lower his performance to avoid overshadowing the others.
3	3	"Lo scalatore delle Ande"	Luca Vendruscolo	Giacomo Ciarrapico, Mattia Torre, Luca Vendruscolo	23 April 2007
An actor hired to play a cyclist appears completely wrong for the part. René quickly replaces him with a Peruvian extra as an Andean climber. Alessandro handles the casting of extras. Camera assistant Furio is fired after a staged argument with Alessandro, orchestrated by Sergio.
4	4	"Qualità o morte"	Luca Vendruscolo	Giacomo Ciarrapico, Mattia Torre, Luca Vendruscolo	30 April 2007
René tries to impress an old friend by filming with "quality", but quickly gives up. Alessandro negotiates a small salary. Biascica, in love with makeup artist Gloria, follows Alessandro's advice and makes a good impression.
5	5	"A + B = C"	Luca Vendruscolo	Giacomo Ciarrapico, Mattia Torre, Luca Vendruscolo	7 May 2007
To attract more viewers, Martellone, a crude comedian, is added to the cast. His improvised scene with Stanis is poorly done but accepted by the network. Corinna claims she's pregnant and wants to leave, but it turns out to be a false alarm.
6	6	"Come Lars von Trier"	Luca Vendruscolo	Giacomo Ciarrapico, Mattia Torre, Luca Vendruscolo	14 May 2007
Fabio, a disabled fan, visits the set but annoys the crew. Corinna refuses to film a love scene, so René convinces everyone to undress to ease her tension. Arianna directs the scene. The fan is eventually kicked off the set. Arianna kisses Alessandro, then immediately sends him away.
7	7	"Quando un uomo sente la fine"	Luca Vendruscolo	Giacomo Ciarrapico, Mattia Torre, Luca Vendruscolo	21 May 2007
René fears being fired, but Lopez is pleased with the footage. The crew celebrates with limoncello, gets drunk, and fails to work. René improvises a scene to impress Lopez. Lopez suggests René find political backing to keep his job.
8	8	"Buon Natale"	Luca Vendruscolo	Giacomo Ciarrapico, Mattia Torre, Luca Vendruscolo	28 May 2007
René has stomach problems and directs from a bathroom. Stanis's father visits hoping for a role, but proves useless. In the end, René acts in the scene himself to wrap before the holidays.
9	9	"Una questione di principio"	Luca Vendruscolo	Giacomo Ciarrapico, Mattia Torre, Luca Vendruscolo	4 June 2007
A controversial abortion scene must be reshot. Actress Verena demands extra money, then quits anyway. Duccio accuses the crew of stealing money, only to later find it in his jacket. René edits the scene using old footage, avoiding the need for Verena.
10	10	"Il gioielliere"	Luca Vendruscolo	Giacomo Ciarrapico, Mattia Torre, Luca Vendruscolo	11 June 2007
Corinna can't pronounce "jeweler", delaying a scene. During a press conference with fake journalists, Biascica confronts Lopez about unpaid overtime. Later, Corinna dodges the word in the scene to save face in front of real journalists.
11	11	"Exit Strategy"	Luca Vendruscolo	Giacomo Ciarrapico, Mattia Torre, Luca Vendruscolo	18 June 2007
The show's premiere gets average ratings. René secretly films a short film, The Red Ant, using crew members. Stanis tries to charm Alessandro's girlfriend, Elena. The short turns out surprisingly well.
12	12	"Una giornata particolare"	Luca Vendruscolo	Giacomo Ciarrapico, Mattia Torre, Luca Vendruscolo	25 June 2007
While René is away, a guest director arrives—actually a prank by his cinematographer, Glauco, who takes over. He changes everything, roasts the actors, but gets good results. Arianna realizes the trick at the end.
13	13	"Stanis non deve morire"	Luca Vendruscolo	Giacomo Ciarrapico, Mattia Torre, Luca Vendruscolo	2 July 2007
Due to poor ratings, the show is cancelled. René films a final episode where all characters die, but Stanis refuses. He self-funds a new scene where his character survives. Meanwhile, René's fish Boris gets sick but recovers.
14	14	"L'ultima puntata"	Luca Vendruscolo	Giacomo Ciarrapico, Mattia Torre, Luca Vendruscolo	9 July 2007
To save money, the final episode is shot in two days. Corinna also asks for her character to survive. Alessandro suggests leaving her fate ambiguous. Just before wrapping, the network announces record ratings—Gli occhi del cuore is back on.

=== Season 2 (2008) ===
No. overall	No. in season	Title	Directed by	Written by	Original release date
15	1	"La mia Africa (prima parte)"	Giacomo Ciarrapico, Mattia Torre, Luca Vendruscolo	Giacomo Ciarrapico, Mattia Torre, Luca Vendruscolo	12 May 2008
Gli occhi del cuore keeps strong ratings. Corinna leaves the cast for a new series about Mother Teresa. A special episode in Africa is planned to write her out. Alessandro accidentally sends away Cristina, the new lead. He later gets electrocuted on set and ruins a take, angering René and the crew.
16	2	"La mia Africa (seconda parte)"	Giacomo Ciarrapico, Mattia Torre, Luca Vendruscolo	Giacomo Ciarrapico, Mattia Torre, Luca Vendruscolo	12 May 2008
Alessandro feels guilty for Cristina's disappearance, since she's the daughter of a powerful financier. After much effort, Cristina returns and forgives Alessandro. The handover scene from Corinna to Cristina is completed. Arianna, showing affection, tells Alessandro no one will take his spot.
17	3	"Chi si salverà?"	Giacomo Ciarrapico, Mattia Torre, Luca Vendruscolo	Giacomo Ciarrapico, Mattia Torre, Luca Vendruscolo	19 May 2008
The network asks René to fire someone. Sergio finds that the only unprotected crew member is Gloria, the makeup artist. Mariano Giusti, a mentally unstable actor, returns wanting to play a priest in a new show. Alessandro is tasked with keeping him in check but is mistreated.
18	4	"Il travestimento è saltato"	Giacomo Ciarrapico, Mattia Torre, Luca Vendruscolo	Giacomo Ciarrapico, Mattia Torre, Luca Vendruscolo	26 May 2008
Karin, a sexy actress, joins the cast, causing tension with Arianna. Gloria asks René for help finding work. Biascica tries therapy. Alessandro tells Arianna he likes her but is rejected. On set, Karin clashes with René and threatens consequences.
19	5	"L'affaire Martellone"	Giacomo Ciarrapico, Mattia Torre, Luca Vendruscolo	Giacomo Ciarrapico, Mattia Torre, Luca Vendruscolo	2 June 2008
Martellone is involved in a drug and prostitution scandal. The network wants his character killed off, but he negotiates to remain in a coma. He later joins a trashy reality show. Stanis keeps unsuccessfully pursuing Cristina.
20	6	"No logo"	Giacomo Ciarrapico, Mattia Torre, Luca Vendruscolo	Giacomo Ciarrapico, Mattia Torre, Luca Vendruscolo	9 June 2008
René, Sergio, and Glauco secretly insert product placement into an episode. Only Stanis resists but is bribed with his own scene. Alessandro breaks up with Elena. Glauco's presence worries Duccio, who fears losing his job.
21	7	"A morte il conte"	Giacomo Ciarrapico, Mattia Torre, Luca Vendruscolo	Giacomo Ciarrapico, Mattia Torre, Luca Vendruscolo	16 June 2008
Mariano reacts violently to profanity, prompting a ban on swearing on set. He refuses to act but is convinced by René to finish the scene. Alessandro, now homeless, spends the night at the studio and sleeps with Karin. Arianna finds them in the morning.
22	8	"Il cielo sopra Stanis"	Giacomo Ciarrapico, Mattia Torre, Luca Vendruscolo	Giacomo Ciarrapico, Mattia Torre, Luca Vendruscolo	23 June 2008
Arianna hides her jealousy but is clearly affected. René hosts Alessandro. Stanis refuses to shoot a key scene until Wim Wenders arrives. Arianna calls in a serious actress to move production forward. Camera assistant Pinuccio is fired; Lorenzo takes his place with worse pay.
23	9	"La figlia di Mazinga"	Giacomo Ciarrapico, Mattia Torre, Luca Vendruscolo	Giacomo Ciarrapico, Mattia Torre, Luca Vendruscolo	30 June 2008
René is offered the doomed project Machiavelli, sensing he's being pushed out. Cristina faints under pressure. Lorenzo, now a camera assistant, is bullied by colleagues for working too hard.
24	10	"Un tuzzo"	Giacomo Ciarrapico, Mattia Torre, Luca Vendruscolo	Giacomo Ciarrapico, Mattia Torre, Luca Vendruscolo	7 July 2008
Karin and Stanis have no chemistry. Cristina doubts the show's quality. René slaps her; she retaliates with a headbutt. René walks off defeated. Stanis realizes he loves Arianna. Alessandro ends things with Karin.
25	11	"L'Italia che lavora"	Giacomo Ciarrapico, Mattia Torre, Luca Vendruscolo	Giacomo Ciarrapico, Mattia Torre, Luca Vendruscolo	14 July 2008
Sergio pays Biascica's overdue overtime, solving his inner crisis. René is haunted by visions of Sandroni, a previous director who committed suicide. Mariano fights with his priest-agent. Stanis confesses his love for Arianna. Alessandro is also in love with her.
26	12	"Usa la forza, Ferretti"	Giacomo Ciarrapico, Mattia Torre, Luca Vendruscolo	Giacomo Ciarrapico, Mattia Torre, Luca Vendruscolo	21 July 2008
René is briefly replaced by Duccio, who shoots poor scenes. Cristina questions her role. Arianna sleeps with Stanis out of boredom. René finds Tarzanetto, former Machiavelli director, who cryptically urges him to "use the Force".
27	13	"Il sordomuto, il senatore e gli equilibri del Paese (prima parte)"	Giacomo Ciarrapico, Mattia Torre, Luca Vendruscolo	Giacomo Ciarrapico, Mattia Torre, Luca Vendruscolo	28 July 2008
Arianna forgets to call an actor; Alessandro steps in as a mute gay prisoner. The crew sadistically enjoys the scene. Arianna later tells Alessandro she has feelings for him, but wants to keep things professional. Cristina wants out of the show, but her father refuses to pay the penalty. The network warns René of possible reshoots based on election results.
28	14	"Il sordomuto, il senatore e gli equilibri del Paese (seconda parte)"	Giacomo Ciarrapico, Mattia Torre, Luca Vendruscolo	Giacomo Ciarrapico, Mattia Torre, Luca Vendruscolo	28 July 2008
The final episode is rewritten according to exit polls. Cristina also writes her character off and leaves the show. Mariano tracks down and kills his agent. Lorenzo's uncle becomes a senator. Arianna and Alessandro kiss. René, unexpectedly reconfirmed as director, announces he's quitting Gli occhi del cuore to pursue more serious work. A flash-forward shows him directing Machiavelli with the same cast and crew.

=== Season 3 (2010) ===
No. overall	No. in season	Title	Directed by	Written by	Original release date
29	1	"Un'altra televisione è possibile (prima parte)"	Davide Marengo	Giacomo Ciarrapico, Mattia Torre, Luca Vendruscolo	1 March 2010
René tries to pitch his historical drama Machiavelli but is told production will take at least two years. Desperate and broke, he secretly accepts a job with a rival network in Milan directing the pilot of a cheap sitcom, Troppo frizzante, starring five comedians with catchphrases. Meanwhile, Alessandro films a short with Lorenzo; during filming, René's fish tank breaks, mixing up the fish, including Boris.
30	2	"Un'altra televisione è possibile (seconda parte)"	Davide Marengo	Giacomo Ciarrapico, Mattia Torre, Luca Vendruscolo	1 March 2010
René tries to leave Milan, eventually faking an emotional goodbye to escape. Back in Rome, he is approached by young executive Claudio, who offered him to direct Medical Dimension, a spin-off drama of Gli occhi del cuore starring Stanis, aiming for more realism. René accepts. Meanwhile, Alessandro and Arianna's romance stalls due to political differences.
31	3	"La qualità non basta"	Davide Marengo	Giacomo Ciarrapico, Mattia Torre, Luca Vendruscolo	8 March 2010
Filming for Medical Dimension begins. René demands quality and hires medical consultant Bruno Staffa, who soon proves unstable. Lead actress Jasmine is fired after poor performance and replaced with Fabiana—René's daughter. René hides their relationship to avoid favoritism accusations.
32	4	"La clip"	Davide Marengo	Giacomo Ciarrapico, Mattia Torre, Luca Vendruscolo	8 March 2010
The network pressures René for a trailer to beat a rival show. Fabiana joins the set; René asks Arianna to hide her identity. A new high-tech camera threatens the crew's jobs. Biascica orchestrates its "disappearance" to protect them. Fabiana impresses in a seizure scene, but no one notices. Arianna helps Alessandro in his secondary job as scriptwriter.
33	5	"L'importanza di piacere ai notai"	Davide Marengo	Giacomo Ciarrapico, Mattia Torre, Luca Vendruscolo	15 March 2010
Stanis wants to appeal to wealthier viewers and exploits his contract to change his character and directorial choices. A new actor, Valerio, plays a disabled psychologist and stays in a wheelchair off-screen to remain in character. Tensions rise as Stanis rewrites scenes. René finally admits Fabiana is his daughter, earning applause.
34	6	"Coprolalia"	Davide Marengo	Giacomo Ciarrapico, Mattia Torre, Luca Vendruscolo	15 March 2010
The writers reuse the notary character from Gli occhi del cuore and introduce heavy swearing for realism. Stanis overacts. Martellone, the notary, hijacks the script and kills off his character via euthanasia. Meanwhile, Alessandro is jealous of Arianna's American friend Tyron.
35	7	"Come Durok"	Davide Marengo	Giacomo Ciarrapico, Mattia Torre, Luca Vendruscolo	22 March 2010
Medical Dimension is heading to the Roma Fiction Fest. René wants no part of it. On set, actor Remo Arcangeli plays grandpa Joe with disdain. Itala quits, tired of chasing "quality". Alessandro struggles with writing ethics. René eventually agrees to attend the festival.
36	8	"Buona festa del Grazie"	Davide Marengo	Giacomo Ciarrapico, Mattia Torre, Luca Vendruscolo	22 March 2010
The team films in a private home. Stanis takes amphetamines for a rage scene, becoming uncontrollable. They realize the "Festa del Grazie" in the script is a bad translation of Thanksgiving from an American show. After destroying the set, they flee before the homeowner returns.
37	9	"Puzza di capolavoro"	Davide Marengo	Giacomo Ciarrapico, Mattia Torre, Luca Vendruscolo	29 March 2010
René and Arianna discover much of the script is plagiarized. The writers promise originality, but continue copying foreign shows. Valerio stinks after biking to set; Arcangeli refuses to work with him. A fake washing scene is added to force Valerio to shower. The writers remain unproductive.
38	10	"L'epifania"	Davide Marengo	Giacomo Ciarrapico, Mattia Torre, Luca Vendruscolo	29 March 2010
Budget is gone. Sergio hires a drug addict as an extra. A woman accidentally appears in a background shot, and René wants to keep the take. Alessandro is tasked with getting her release form but fails. Lopez demands fake bloopers for promo purposes. Claudio warns René: Medical Dimension was always meant to fail.
39	11	"Stopper"	Davide Marengo	Giacomo Ciarrapico, Mattia Torre, Luca Vendruscolo	5 April 2010
A famous footballer is expected on set for a cameo. 50-year-old Sergio Brio, a former Juventus defender, shows up. Stanis dispenses medical advice off-script. René assumes Brio is still an active player and treats him accordingly, as his role is meant to be a star athlete in his prime. Renè later realizes the network has cut funding. Lopez confirms the show was designed to flop, airing against the Champions League final to ensure failure.
40	12	"Nella rete"	Davide Marengo	Giacomo Ciarrapico, Mattia Torre, Luca Vendruscolo	5 April 2010
René learns from the network head, Dr. Cane, that Medical Dimension was a decoy to discredit "quality" TV. Disheartened, René neglects the set. Fabiana is offered a Paolo Sorrentino film but stays for her father. Sorrentino personally goes to the set to convince her. Valerio quits. René has a revelation and takes Alessandro to confront the writers on their boat.
41	13	"Ritorno al futuro (prima parte)"	Davide Marengo	Giacomo Ciarrapico, Mattia Torre, Luca Vendruscolo	12 April 2010
René forces the writers to work at gunpoint. He returns to set with a new plan: shoot Gli occhi del cuore 3, recycling clichés to make something the network will accept. He recalls past actors and uses tricks to film missing scenes.
42	14	"Ritorno al futuro (seconda parte)"	Davide Marengo	Giacomo Ciarrapico, Mattia Torre, Luca Vendruscolo	12 April 2010
Filming proceeds with absurd plot twists. The final product is completed. René submits it to the network, but it's shelved. The relationship between Alessandro and Arianna ends, and they go their separate ways. Six months later, René and Duccio work as forest rangers in Abruzzo. Dr. Cane discovers the DVD, loves it, and tells Lopez to call René.

=== Season 4 (2022) ===
No. overall	No. in season	Title	Directed by	Written by	Original release date
43	1	"The Last Shall Be First" (Italian: Gli ultimi saranno i primi)	Giacomo Ciarrapico, Luca Vendruscolo	Giacomo Ciarrapico, Luca Vendruscolo	26 October 2022
Over a decade has passed since the events of season 3 and Boris: The Film. Traditional TV is in decline, and streaming platforms now dominate the industry. Stanis and Corinna, now married, launch their own production company and pitch The Life of Jesus, with Stanis in the lead role. They enlist the help of Alessandro, now an executive at a global platform. René returns as director, reuniting the original crew—except for Itala, who has passed away, and Sergio, who's back in jail. Lopez steps in as production manager. The platform agrees to consider the project.
44	2	"Freaking Cana" (Italian: Cana maledetta)	Giacomo Ciarrapico, Luca Vendruscolo	Giacomo Ciarrapico, Luca Vendruscolo	26 October 2022
Corinna is cast as Mary, despite being talentless and overpaid. The crew tries to sabotage her, but she unexpectedly delivers a decent performance, aided by Lorenzo. The platform demands a teen subplot. The writers recycle an old crime project by René and adapt it into Jesus' teenage years. They are also required to include a black apostle and a Chinese apostle to increase diversity. Corinna is reluctantly confirmed in the role.
45	3	"Fucking René Ferreedi!"	Giacomo Ciarrapico, Luca Vendruscolo	Giacomo Ciarrapico, Luca Vendruscolo	26 October 2022
René unsuccessfully tries to replace Stanis with an international star. Mariano returns to play John the Baptist, mentally unstable as ever. Cristina also returns. Tatti Barletta is hired as Judas. Lopez handles money laundering via his 'Ndrangheta-affiliated cousin Michele, who also places Calabrian extras on set. Angelo threatens Alessandro over Lalla, the new assistant.
46	4	"The Set of Miracles" (Italian: Il set dei miracoli)	Giacomo Ciarrapico, Luca Vendruscolo	Giacomo Ciarrapico, Luca Vendruscolo	26 October 2022
Karin returns as Mary Magdalene, oversexualizing the role. The platform demands more diversity — not just in casting, but also behind the scenes. Lopez launches an investigation to identify LGBTQ+ crew members. Duccio is blind from cataracts and Lorenzo is sick. Biascica takes over, and scenes come out surprisingly well. A backstage video sparks false racism accusations involving Biascica.
47	5	"Jesus' Sense of Humor" (Italian: Il senso dell'umorismo di Gesù)	Giacomo Ciarrapico, Luca Vendruscolo	Giacomo Ciarrapico, Luca Vendruscolo	26 October 2022
Extras are missing; the crew fills in. Elisabetta, the platform's social media manager, forces René onto TikTok. Alfredo is arrested after offering drugs to an undercover cop. Martellone insists on playing Zacchaeus seriously, but is forced back into comedy. René's TikTok attempt fails.
48	6	"Liberté, Egalité, Grabilité" (Italian: Liberté! Egalité! Prensilité!)	Giacomo Ciarrapico, Luca Vendruscolo	Giacomo Ciarrapico, Luca Vendruscolo	26 October 2022
Glauco replaces Alfredo. Duccio regains his sight, reigniting conflict with Lorenzo, who, under the influence of LSD, tries to decode the platform's algorithm. Tatti leads an actors' strike. Corinna argues with Stanis. Backed by Glauco, René secretly films new scenes with Tatti.
49	7	"Forgive Them for They Know Not What They Do" (Italian: Perdona loro perché non sanno quello che fanno)	Giacomo Ciarrapico, Luca Vendruscolo	Giacomo Ciarrapico, Luca Vendruscolo	26 October 2022
René avoids directing the crucifixion, focusing instead on unscripted scenes involving Judas and the teen actors. Mariano brings a real gun to set, forcing the crucifixion to be shot quickly. The scene works and reconciles Stanis and Corinna. Lalla is fired and leaves with Angelo. René reveals to Arianna he's secretly filming a movie stealing scenes from the show. Alessandro announces a rival Spanish series is being released.
50	8	"The Eyes of Jesus' Sacred Heart" (Italian: Gli occhi del cuore sacro di Gesù)	Giacomo Ciarrapico, Luca Vendruscolo	Giacomo Ciarrapico, Luca Vendruscolo	26 October 2022
René wants to shoot a final Judas close-up during the Last Supper. Stanis insists on directing; René's crew films the Judas shots in secret. René finishes editing his film about Judas, with Jesus always shown from behind. Allison confronts him; the platform threatens legal action. In London, René defends the film in a bizarre meeting and unexpectedly wins. The film is released. Everyone is satisfied—including the mafia, the platform, and René.

== See also ==
- Boris: The Film
- List of Italian television series
