= Elio Guzzanti =

Italian doctor and politician

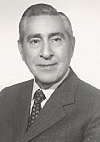

Minister of Health
- In office 17 January 1995 – 17 May 1996
- Prime Minister: Lamberto Dini
- Preceded by: Raffaele Costa
- Succeeded by: Rosy Bindi

Personal details
- Born: 18 August 1920 Rome, Lazio, Italy
- Died: 2 May 2014 (aged 93) Rome, Lazio, Italy
- Education: Sapienza University of Rome
- Profession: Doctor, politician

Elio Guzzanti (August 18, 1920 – May 2, 2014) was an Italian doctor and politician. He was a university teacher at Università Cattolica del Sacro Cuore of his native city, Rome. He was Italian Minister of Health in Lamberto Dini's non-partisan members government.

== Biography ==
Specialist in respiratory diseases and in hygiene, he was director of the hospitals Santo Spirito, San Camillo and Policlinico Umberto I in Rome. From 1976 to 1984 and from 1991 to 1993 he was a member of the Italian Superior Council of Health. From 1985 to 1994 he was health director of the Bambino Gesù Children's Hospital and from 1996 to 1998 he was director of the Agency for Regional Health Services.

Author of numerous publications on health organization, from 17 January 1995 to 17 May 1996 he was Minister of Health with the Dini Cabinet.

He was president of the scientific committee of the Cesare Serono Foundation. On 28 October 2009, following the resignation of the President of the Lazio Region, Piero Marrazzo, he was appointed by the Berlusconi Cabinet as Commissioner for Health in the same Region.

He was scientific director of the Institute for Scientific Hospitalisation and Care IRCCS Oasi di Troina (Enna).

He was Paolo Guzzanti's uncle, a journalist and politician belonging to Responsible Initiative, whose children Corrado, Sabina and Caterina are comedians and celebrities.

He died on May 2, 2014, at the age of 93 at the Policlinico Gemelli in Rome, where he had been hospitalized for a few days.
