= 64th Venice International Film Festival =

2007 Italian film festival edition

- Festival poster
- Opening film: Atonement
- Closing film: Blood Brothers
- Location: Venice, Italy
- Founded: 1932
- Awards: Golden Lion: Lust, Caution
- Hosted by: Ambra Angiolini
- Artistic director: Marco Müller
- Festival date: 29 August – 8 September 2007
- Website: Website

Venice Film Festival chronology
- 65th 63rd

The 64th annual Venice International Film Festival, was held from 29 August to 8 September 2007, at Venice Lido in Italy.

Chinese filmmaker Zhang Yimou was the jury president for the main competition. Italian actress Ambra Angiolini was the Host of the opening and closing ceremonies. The Golden Lion was awarded to Lust, Caution by Ang Lee, marking his second win after Brokeback Mountain (2005).

American filmmaker Tim Burton received the Golden Lion for Lifetime Achievement during the festival.

Once again all the films running the contest were shown for the first time as world premieres in keeping with the festival tradition since the Second World War.

The festival opened with Atonement by Joe Wright, and the closed with Blood Brothers by Alexi Tan.

== Juries ==
=== Main Competition (Venezia 64) ===
- Zhang Yimou, Chinese filmmaker, producer and actor - Jury President
- Catherine Breillat, French filmmaker, novelist and professor of auteur cinema
- Jane Campion, New Zealand filmmaker and producer
- Emanuele Crialese, Italian filmmaker
- Alejandro González Iñárritu, Mexican filmmaker and producer
- Ferzan Özpetek, Turkish-Italian filmmaker
- Paul Verhoeven, Dutch filmmaker and producer

=== Horizons (Orizzonti) ===
- Gregg Araki, American filmmaker - Jury President
- Giorgia Fiorio, Italian photographer
- Ulrich Gregor, German critic
- Frederick Wiseman, American filmmaker and theatre director
- Hala Alabdalla Yakoub, Syrian director and producer

=== Opera Prima ("Luigi de Laurentiis" Award for a Debut Film) ===
- Bill Mechanic, American film producer - Jury President
- Randa Chahal, Lebanese filmmaker and producer
- Rupert Everett, English actor and writer
- Liu Jie, Chinese director
- Valeria Solarino, Italian actress

=== Short Films Competition (Corto Cortissimo) ===
- F. J. Ossang, French director- Jury President
- Yasmine Kassari, Moroccan director
- Roberto Perpignani, Italian film editor

== Official Sections ==
=== In Competition ===
The following films were selected for the main competition:

English title	Original title	Director(s)	Production country
12		Nikita Mihalkov	Russia
The Assassination of Jesse James by the Coward Robert Ford		Andrew Dominik	United States
Atonement (opening film)		Joe Wright	United Kingdom
Chaos, This Is	هي فوضى	Youssef Chahine	Egypt
The Darjeeling Limited		Wes Anderson	United States
Fallen Heroes	Nessuna qualità agli eroi	Paolo Franchi	Italy, Switzerland, France
Help Me Eros	幫幫我，愛神	Lee Kang-sheng	Taiwan
I'm Not There		Todd Haynes	United States
In the City of Sylvia	En la ciudad de Sylvia	José Luis Guerín	Spain
In the Valley of Elah		Paul Haggis	United States
It's a Free World...		Ken Loach	United Kingdom, Italy, Germany, Spain, Poland
Lust, Caution	色，戒	Ang Lee	United States, China, Taiwan
Mad Detective	神探	Johnnie To, Wai Ka-Fai	Hong Kong
Michael Clayton		Tony Gilroy	United States
Nightwatching		Peter Greenaway	United Kingdom, Poland, Canada, Netherlands
Redacted		Brian De Palma	United States
The Romance of Astrea and Celadon	Les Amours d'Astrée et de Céladon	Éric Rohmer	France, Italy, Spain
The Secret of the Grain	La graine et le mulet	Abdellatif Kechiche	France
Sleuth		Kenneth Branagh	United Kingdom, United States
Sukiyaki Western Django	スキヤキ・ウエスタン ジャンゴ	Takashi Miike	Japan
The Sun Also Rises	太阳照常升起	Jiang Wen	China
The Sweet and the Bitter	Il dolce e l'amaro	Andrea Porporati	Italy
The Trial Begins	L'ora di punta	Vincenzo Marra	Italy

=== Out of Competition ===
The following films were selected to be screened out of competition:

English title	Original title	Director(s)	Production country
Venezia Maestri
Beyond the Years	천년학	Im Kwon Taek	South Korea
Blood Brothers (closing film)	天堂口	Alexi Tan	China, Taiwan, Hong Kong
Cassandra's Dream		Woody Allen	United Kingdom, United States
Christopher Columbus – The Enigma	Cristovão Colombo – O enigma	Manoel de Oliveira	Portugal, France
Cleopatra	Cleópatra	Júlio Bressane	Brazil
Disengagement	Désengagement	Amos Gitai	Germany, Italy, Israel, France
A Fistfull of Dollars (1964)	Per un pugno di dollari	Sergio Leone	Italy, Spain, Germany
A Girl Cut in Two	La Fille coupée en deux	Claude Chabrol	France
Glory to the Filmmaker!	監督·ばんざい!	Takeshi Kitano	Japan
REC		Paco Plaza, Jaume Balagueró	Spain
Venezia Notte (Midnight)
Far North		Asif Kapadia	United Kingdom, France
Blade Runner: The Final Cut		Ridley Scott	United States
The Hunting Party		Richard Shepard	United States, Croatia, Bosnia and Herzegovina
The Nanny Diaries		Shari Springer Berman, Robert Pulcini	United States
Nocturna		Adrià Garcìa, Víctor Maldonado	Spain, France

=== Special Events and Homages ===
Occasion / Director	English Title	Original title	Production country
Special Event: Wes Anderson	Hotel Chevalier (short)		United States
75th Anniversary Golden Lion: Bernardo Bertolucci	La via del petrolio (1967)		Italy
75th Anniversary Golden Lion: Bernardo Bertolucci	The Spider's Stratagem (1970)	Strategia del ragno	Italy
Golden Lion for Lifetime Achievement: Tim Burton	The Nightmare Before Christmas		United States
Special Events of the 75th Anniversary: Alexander Kluge	Mein Jahrhundert, mein Tier!		Germany
Special Events of the 75th Anniversary: Alexander Kluge	Das Phänomen der Oper		Germany
Special Events of the 75th Anniversary: Alexander Kluge	Facts and Fakes	Im Sturm der Zeit	Germany
Special Events of the 75th Anniversary: Alexander Kluge	Die poetische Kraft der Theorie		Germany
Special Events of the 75th Anniversary: Alexander Kluge	Der Zauber der verdunkelten Seele		Germany
Venezia Giubileo (1932–2007): Homage to Carlo Lizzani	Hotel Meina		Italy
Venezia Giubileo (1932–2007): Mario Camerini	What Scoundrels Men Are! (1932)	Gli uomini che mascalzoni...	Italy

=== Orizzonti ===
The following films were selected to the Orizzonti main competition:

English title	Original title	Director(s)	Production country
Fiction
Autumn Ball	Sügisball	Veiko Õunpuu	Estonia
Cochochi		Israel Cárdenas, Laura Amelia Guzmán	Mexico, United Kingdom, Canada
Death in the Land of Encantos	Kagadanan sa banwaan ning mga engkanto	Lav Diaz	Philippines
Exodus		Penny Woolcock	United Kingdom
Misbegotten	Mal Nascida	João Canijo	Portugal
Medea Miracle	Médée Miracle	Tonino De Bernardi	Italy, France
The Obscure	小说	Lü Yue	China
Crossing the Line	Il passaggio della linea	Pietro Marcello	Italy
Sad Vacation	サッド ヴァケイション	Shinji Aoyama	Japan
Searchers 2.0		Alex Cox	United States
The Silence Before Bach	Die stille vor Bach	Pere Portabella	Spain
The Story of Richard O	L'Histoire de Richard O.	Damien Odoul	France
With a Girl of Black Soil	Geomen tangyi sonyeo oi	Soo-il Jeon	South Korea, France
Documentaries
Anabazys		Joel Pizzini, Paloma Rocha	Brazil
The Beloved	L'Aimèe	Arnaud Desplechin	France
Drifter	Andarilho	Cao Guimarães	Brazil
Dust	Staub	Hartmut Bitomsky	Germany
Lou Reed's Berlin		Julian Schnabel	United Kingdom, United States
Man from Plains		Jonathan Demme	United States
Mothers	Madri	Barbara Cupisti	Italy
Umbrella	伞	Du Haibin	China
Useless	无用	Jia Zhangke	China
Horizons Events
Callas assoluta		Philippe Kohly	France, Greece
Carlo Goldoni Venezian		Leonardo Autera, Alberto Caldana	Italy
Dall’altra parte della luna		Dario Baldi, Davide Marengo	Italy
Empire II		Amos Poe	United States

=== Short Films Competition (Corto Cortissimo) ===
The following films in 35mm, whose length does not exceed 30 minutes, were selected for the short film competition (Corto Cortissimo):

English title	Original title	Director(s)	Production country
In competition
Lightborne	Alumbramiento	Eduardo Chapero-Jackson	Spain
Dog Altogether		Paddy Considine	United Kingdom
Fritt Fall		Caroline Cowan	Sweden
Friends Forever		Marçal Forés	United Kingdom
Dans la peau		Zoltán Horváth	Switzerland, France
Fish	Mul-Go-Gi	Juhn Jai-hong	South Korea, United States
What Do I Know	Sta ja znam	Sejla Kameric, Timur Makarevic	Bosnia, Slovenia
Crossbow		David Michôd	Australia
With a Little Patience	Türelem	László Nemes	Hungary
Adil e Yusuf		Claudio Noce	Italy
Dragonflies	Wazki	Justyna Nowak	Poland
Tony Zoreil		Valentin Potier	France
Stone People	Lyudi iz kamnya	Leonid Rybakov	Russia
Blind Man's Eye		Matthew Talbot-Kelly	Ireland
Skyggen af Tvivl		Esben Tønnesen	Denmark
Coffee and Allah		Sima Urale	New Zealand
Cargo		Leo Woodhead	Czech Republic, New Zealand
Guodao	国道	Zhang Yue	China

=== Retrospective - Secret History of Italian Cinema 4 ===
Special mono-graphic sessions dedicated to the secret story of Italian cinema. This is the fourth part of the retrospective, initiated at the 61st edition of the festival; the patron of this edition, focused on Italian Spaghetti Western, was the director Quentin Tarantino.

English title	Original title	Director(s)	Production country
The Seven from Texas (1964)	Antes llega la muerte	Joaquín Luis Romero Marchent	Spain, Italy
$100,000 for Ringo (1965)	100.000 dollari per Ringo	Alberto De Martino	Italy, Spain
The Return of Ringo (1965)	Il ritorno di Ringo	Duccio Tessari	Italy, Spain
Savage Gringo (1966)	Ringo del Nebraska	Antonio Román, Mario Bava	Spain, Italy
Blood for a Silver Dollar (1965)	Un dollaro bucato	Giorgio Ferroni	Italy, France
Django (1966)		Sergio Corbucci	Italy, Spain
The Ugly Ones (1966)	El precio de un hombre	Eugenio Martín	Spain, Italy
The Big Gundown (1966)	La resa dei conti	Sergio Sollima	Italy, Spain
Navajo Joe (1966)		Sergio Corbucci	Italy, Spain
Sugar Colt (1966)		Franco Giraldi	Italy, Spain
The Hills Run Red (1966)	Un fiume di dollari	Carlo Lizzani	Italy, Spain
Yankee (1967)		Tinto Brass	Italy, Spain
Ten Thousand Dollars for a Massacre (1967)	10.000 dollari per un massacro	Romolo Guerrieri	Italy
The Dirty Outlaws (1967)	El Desperado	Franco Rossetti	Italy, Spain
Last of the Badmen (1967)	Il tempo degli avvoltoi	Nando Cicero	Italy
Death at Owell Rock (1967)	La morte non conta i dollari	Riccardo Freda	Italy
Django Kill... If You Live, Shoot! (1967)	Se sei vivo spara	Giulio Questi	Italy, Spain
The Ruthless Four (1969)	Ognuno per sé	Giorgio Capitani	Italy, West Germany
Django, Prepare a Coffin (1968)	Preparati la bara!	Ferdinando Baldi	Italy
Tepepa (1968)		Giulio Petroni	Italy, Spain
A Noose for Django (1969)	Una lunga fila di croci	Sergio Garrone	Italy
The Reward's Yours... The Man's Mine (1969)	La taglia è tua... l'uomo l'ammazzo io	Edoardo Mulargia	Italy, Spain
They Call Me Trinity (1970)	Lo chiamavano Trinità	Enzo Barboni	Italy
Matalo! (1970)		Cesare Canevari	Italy, Spain
Compañeros (1970)	Vamos a matar compañeros	Sergio Corbucci	Italy, Spain, West Germany
Vengeance Is a Dish Served Cold (1971)	La vendetta è un piatto che si serve freddo	Pasquale Squitieri	Italy
The Grand Duel (1972)	Il grande duello	Giancarlo Santi	Italy, West Germany, France
The Fighting Fist of Shanghai Joe (1973)	Il mio nome è Shangai Joe	Mario Caiano	Italy
A Reason to Live, a Reason to Die (1972)	Una ragione per vivere e una per morire	Tonino Valerii	Italy, Spain, France, West Germany
Four of the Apocalypse (1975)	I quattro dell'apocalisse	Lucio Fulci	Italy
Keoma (1976)		Enzo G. Castellari	Italy
Retrospective events
Una Questione poco privata – Conversazione con Giulio Questi (2007)		Gianfranco Pannone	Italy
The Fort of Death (1969)	五人の賞金稼ぎ	Eiichi Kudo	Japan

=== New Versions Restored ===
As a pre-opening event of this future section, the restored Digital Cinema version of David Wark Griffith’s Intolerance (1916) was screened as a world premiere, in collaboration with the Le Giornate del Cinema Muto di Pordenone. "Venice Classics" which features restored classic films and documentaries on cinema, started as a new section in 2012, at the 69th Venice International Film Festival.

== Independents Sections ==
=== Venice International Film Critics' Week ===
The following feature films were selected to be screened as In Competition for the 22nd Venice International Film Critics’ Week:

English title	Original title	Director(s)	Production country
In competition
24 Bars	24 measures	Jalil Lespert	France
The Girl by the Lake	La ragazza del lago	Andrea Molaioli	Italy
Karoy		Zhanna Issabaeva	Kazakhstan
The Most Distant Course	最遙遠的距離	Lin Jing-jie	Taiwan
The Nines		John August	United States
Small Gods		Dimitri Karakatsanis	Belgium
Soaring	Otryv	Aleksandr Mindadze	Russia
Homage to Ousmane Sembene
Black Girl	La noire de...	Ousmane Sembene	Senegal
The Wagoner	Borom Sarret	Ousmane Sembene	Senegal
Special Event
Year of the Nail	Año Uña	Jonás Cuarón	United States

=== Venice Days ===
The following films were selected for the 4th edition of Venice Days (Giornate Degli Autori) autonomous section:

English title	Original title	Director(s)	Production country
Andalucia		Alain Gomis	France
Bianciardi!		Massimo Coppola	Italy
Born Without	Nacido sin	Eva Norvind	Mexico
Cargo 200	Груз 200	Aleksei Balabanov	Russia
Continental, a Film Without Guns	Continental, un film sans fusil	Stéphane Lafleur	Canada
Don't Think About It	Non pensarci	Gianni Zanasi	Italy
Head Under Water	Freischwimmer	Andreas Kleinert	Germany
Plum Rain	La pluie des prunes	Frédéric Fisbach	France
Shall We Kiss?	Un baiser s'il vous plaît	Emmanuel Mouret	France
The Speed of Life		Ed Radtke	United States
Sympathy for the Lobster	Le ragioni dell'aragosta	Sabina Guzzanti	Italy
Tricks	Sztuczki	Andrzej Jakimowski	Poland
Under the Bombs	Sous les bombes	Philippe Aractingi	France, Lebanon, United Kingdom
Valzer		Salvatore Maira	Italy
Viaggio in corso nel cinema di Carlo Lizzani		Francesca Del Sette	Italy
The Zone	La zona	Rodrigo Plá	Spain, Mexico

== Official Awards ==
=== In Competition (Venezia 64) ===
- Golden Lion: Lust, Caution by Ang Lee
- Silver Lion for Best Director: Brian De Palma for Redacted
- Special Jury Prize:
  - I'm Not There by Todd Haynes
  - The Secret of the Grain by Abdellatif Kechiche
- Volpi Cup for Best Actor: Brad Pitt for The Assassination of Jesse James by the Coward Robert Ford
- Volpi Cup for Best Actress: Cate Blanchett for I'm Not There
- Marcello Mastroianni Award: Hafsia Herzi for The Secret of the Grain
- Golden Osella for Best Cinematography: Rodrigo Prieto for Lust, Caution
- Golden Osella for Best Screenplay: Paul Laverty for It's a Free World...
- Special Lion: Nikita Mikhalkov

=== Golden Lion for Lifetime Achievement ===
- Tim Burton
- Bernardo Bertolucci

=== Horizons (Orizzonti) ===
- Best Film: Autumn Ball by Veiko Õunpuu
- Best Documentary: Useless by Jia Zhangke
  - Special Mention: Death in the Land of Encantos by Lav Diaz

=== Short Film Competition (Corto Cortissimo) ===
- Silver Lion for Best Short Film: Dog Altogether by Paddy Considine
- UIP Award for the Best European Short Film: Lightborne by Eduardo Chapero-Jackson
  - Special Mention: Stone People by Leonid Rybakov

=== Luigi De Laurentis Award for a Debut Film ===
- La Zona by Rodrigo Plá

== Independent Sections Awards ==
=== Venice International Film Critics' Week ===
- Critics' Week Award: The Most Distant Course by Lin Jing-jie
- Isvema Award: The Girl by the Lake by Andrea Molaioli

Venice Days (Giornate Degli Autori)

- Label Europa Cinemas: Tricks by Andrzej Jakimowski
- FEDIC Award: Don't Think About It by Gianni Zanasi
- Brian Award: Sympathy for the Lobster by Sabina Guzzanti
- Laterna Magica Prize: Tricks by Andrzej Jakimowski
- CinemaAvvenire Award: The Zone by Rodrigo Plá
- Award of the City of Rome: The Zone by Rodrigo Plá
- EIUC Award (Venice Days): Under the Bombs by Philippe Aractingi

== Independent Awards ==
The following collateral awards were conferred to films of the official selection:

=== FIPRESCI Awards ===
- Best Film (Main competition): The Secret of the Grain by Abdellatif Kechiche
- Best Film (Horizons): Jimmy Carter Man from Plains by Jonathan Demme

=== SIGNIS Award ===
- In the Valley of Elah by Paul Haggis
  - Special Mention: The Secret of the Grain by Abdellatif Kechiche
  - Special Mention: It's a Free World... by Ken Loach

=== Francesco Pasinetti Awards ===
- Best Film: Don't Think About It by Gianni Zanasi
  - Special Mention: Valzer by Salvatore Maira
- Best Actor: Toni Servillo for The Girl by the Lake
- Best Actress: Valeria Solarino for Valzer

=== C.I.C.A.E. Award ===
- With the Girl of Black Soil by Soo-il Jeon

=== Prize of the Forum for Cinema and Literature ===
- Atonement by Joe Wright

=== Little Golden Lion ===
- The Darjeeling Limited by Wes Anderson

=== Queer Lion ===
- The Speed of Life by Ed Radtke
  - Special Mention: Sleuth by Kenneth Branagh

=== Young Cinema Award ===
- Best Film in Competition: The Secret of the Grain by Abdellatif Kechiche
- Best Film in Parallel Sections: Under the Bombs by Philippe Aractingi
- Best Italian Film: Don't Think About It by Gianni Zanasi

=== Open Prize ===
- Nightwatching by Peter Greenaway

=== Doc/It Award ===
- The Beloved by Arnaud Desplechin
  - Special Mention: Crossing the Line by Pietro Marcello

=== Lina Mangiacapre Award ===
- With the Girl of Black Soil by Soo-il Jeon

=== Filmcritica "Bastone Bianco" Award ===
- A Girl Cut in Two by Claude Chabrol

=== Future Film Festival Digital Award ===
- Redacted by Brian De Palma

=== Biografilm Award ===
- Jimmy Carter Man from Plains by Jonathan Demme

=== 'CinemAvvenire' Award ===
- I'm Not There by Todd Haynes

=== EIUC Award ===
- Main competition: It's a Free World... by Ken Loach
- Horizons: Jimmy Carter Man from Plains by Jonathan Demme

=== Mimmo Rotella Foundation Award ===
- Nightwatching by Peter Greenaway

== Notes ==
The prize awarded to Cate Blanchett was received by Heath Ledger on behalf of the actress, who could not be present.
