= Liberi tutti =

Italian television series

- Genre: Comedy
- Created by: Giacomo Ciarrapico; Luca Vendruscolo
- Written by: Giacomo Ciarrapico; Luca Vendruscolo
- Directed by: Giacomo Ciarrapico; Luca Vendruscolo
- Starring: Giorgio Tirabassi; Anita Caprioli; Thomas Trabacchi; Valeria Bilello; Caterina Guzzanti; Ludovica Martino; Massimo De Lorenzo; Ugo Dighero; Giordano De Plano; Rosanna Gentili; Lino Musella; Franco Pinelli; Carlo De Ruggieri; Luca Amorosino; Andrea Roncato
- Country of origin: Italy
- No. of seasons: 1
- No. of episodes: 12

Production
- Running time: 25 minutes

Original release
- Network: RaiPlay; Rai 3
- Release: 14 December 2019

Liberi tutti is a 2019 Italian television series written and directed by Giacomo Ciarrapico and Luca Vendruscolo.

Produced by Rai Fiction and Italian International Film, it was released on RaiPlay on 14 December 2019. The series aired on Rai 3 in May 2020.

== Cast ==
=== Main cast ===
- Giorgio Tirabassi as Michele Venturi
- Anita Caprioli as Eleonora
- Thomas Trabacchi as Riccardo
- Valeria Bilello as Nicoletta
- Caterina Guzzanti as Martina
- Ludovica Martino as Chiara
- Massimo De Lorenzo as Giovanni
- Ugo Dighero as Mario
- Giordano De Plano as Lapo
- Rosanna Gentili as Iolde
- Lino Musella as Domenico
- Franco Pinelli as Pasquale
- Carlo De Ruggieri as Spy 1
- Luca Amorosino as Spy 2
- Andrea Roncato as JJ

=== Guest cast ===
- Giulia Anchisi as Idea
- Emiliano Campagnola as Alberto
- Giulia Mombelli as Giulia
- Romana Maggiora Vergano as Valentina
- Maurizio Pepe as Marcus
- Gerhard Koloneci as Gleb
- Cristina Pellegrino as the Magistrate
- Andrea Bruschi as Maurizio Tavani
- Adelmo Togliani as Prince Ciro Del Poggio di Filicudi
- Emanuele Linfatti as the artist
- Giulio Ferretto as Andrea Quattropani
- Lele Marchitelli as Guglielmo
- Ivan Urbinati as Menicucci

== See also ==
- List of Italian television series
