= La pecora nera =

La pecora nera may refer to:

- La pecora nera (1968 film)
- La pecora nera (2010 film)
