= Boris: The Film =

2011 film

- Film poster
- Directed by: Giacomo Ciarrapico; Mattia Torre; Luca Vendruscolo
- Written by: Giacomo Ciarrapico; Mattia Torre; Luca Vendruscolo
- Based on: Boris
- Produced by: Fausto Brizzi; Mario Gianani; Lorenzo Mieli
- Starring: Luca Amorosino; Valerio Aprea; Ninni Bruschetta; Paolo Calabresi; Antonio Catania; Carolina Crescentini; Massimo De Lorenzo; Carlo Luca De Ruggieri; Alberto Di Stasio; Roberta Fiorentini; Caterina Guzzanti; Francesco Pannofino; Andrea Sartoretti; Pietro Sermonti; Alessandro Tiberi; Giorgio Tirabassi
- Cinematography: Mauro Marchetti
- Music by: Elio e le Storie Tese
- Production companies: Wildside; Rai Cinema; Sky Cinema
- Distributed by: 01 Distribution
- Release date: 1 April 2011
- Running time: 108 minutes
- Country: Italy
- Language: Italian

Boris: The Film (Italian: Boris - Il film) is a 2011 Italian comedy film directed by Giacomo Ciarrapico, Mattia Torre and Luca Vendruscolo. The film serves as a continuation of the third season of the television series Boris and features most of the original cast. The plot follows René Ferretti and his crew as they navigate their first experience with a film production.

The film earned Carolina Crescentini both a Nastro d'Argento and a Ciak d'Oro for Best Supporting Actress.

== Plot ==
René Ferretti, disillusioned by the poor quality of the TV drama Il giovane Ratzinger, abandons the production after yet another creative imposition from the network. He withdraws from the industry, falling into depression. Months later, his friend Sergio, recovering from a heart attack, acquires the rights to the political bestseller La casta. Together, they see an opportunity to break into serious cinema with a socially engaged film.

Initially supportive, network executive Lopez appears to greenlight the project. However, early compromises force René to abandon the investigative intent, opting instead for a metaphorical narrative. Despite this, the film attracts top-tier collaborators, including acclaimed actress Marilita Loy. René parts ways with his old TV crew, retaining only Alessandro and Arianna.

Production quickly deteriorates: the set becomes hostile, René is dismissed by professionals as a second-rate director, and he is eventually forced to rehire his old team. Amid setbacks—including actor Stanis's disruptive presence and Marilita's instability—René perseveres. Things improve briefly with the casting of rising star Francesco Campo, but his sudden death from a heroin overdose halts filming.

René and Sergio learn that Lopez never had official network approval. Sergio suffers another heart attack. Pressured, Lopez convinces the network to repackage the footage as a Christmas comedy. The network agrees. René capitulates, turning his art film into the commercial Natale con la casta, filled with crude humor and gratuitous sexual content. The film is a commercial success, but René is repulsed. Disillusioned with the film industry, he returns to television and resumes filming Il giovane Ratzinger, now fully resigned to its mediocrity.

== Cast ==
- Francesco Pannofino as René Ferretti
- Alessandro Tiberi as Alessandro
- Caterina Guzzanti as Arianna Dell'Arti
- Carolina Crescentini as Corinna Negri
- Pietro Sermonti as Stanis La Rochelle
- Ninni Bruschetta as Duccio Patané
- Paolo Calabresi as Augusto Biascica
- Antonio Catania as Diego Lopez
- Alberto Di Stasio as Sergio
- Carlo Luca De Ruggieri as Lorenzo
- Roberta Fiorentini as Itala
- Luca Amorosino as Alfredo
- Valerio Aprea as screenwriter 1
- Massimo De Lorenzo as screenwriter 2
- Andrea Sartoretti as screenwriter 3
- Giorgio Tirabassi as Glauco Benetti
- Massimiliano Bruno as Nando Martellone
- Eugenia Costantini as Cristina Avola Burkstaller
- Claudio Gioè as Francesco Campo
- Massimo Popolizio as Massimo
- Karin Proia as Karin
- Thomas Trabacchi as Fabio Carli
- Federico Pacifici as Brusiani
- Ivan Urbinati as the Natale al Polo Nord actor
- Adelmo Togliani as Tullio
- Rosanna Gentili as Marilita Loy
- Paolo Bessegato as Emilio Baranes
- Lavinia Biagi as Giovanna Borromeo
- Monica Samassa as Carolina De Luca
- Vanessa Compagnucci as Elisabetta
- Vanni De Lucia as Dante Milonga
- Barbara Folchitto as the journalist
- Angelica Leo as Fabiana
- Nicola Piovani as himself
