= Abdul Salam al-Ujayli =

Syrian doctor and novelist (1918–2006)

Abdul Salam al-Ujaylī
- عَبْد السَّلَام الْعُجَيْلِيّ
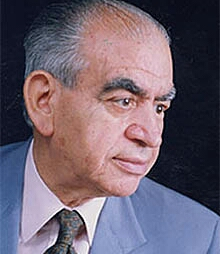
- Born: 1918; Raqqa, Kingdom of Syria
- Died: April 5, 2006 (aged 87–88); Raqqa, Syria
- Occupations: Doctor, novelist, politician

Abdul Salam al-Ujayli (Arabic: عَبْد السَّلَام الْعُجَيْلِيّ ALA-LC: ʻAbd al-Salām al-ʻUjaylī; (Note: Also variously rendered in English as Abdul Salam Ojeili/Ujaily.) 1918 – April 5, 2006) was a Syrian novelist, doctor and politician.

== Life ==
Born in Raqqa, Syria, he taught in various Syrian universities such as the Aleppo University and Damascus University. He was elected deputy of Raqqa in 1947. He took a number of ministerial posts in the ministries of culture and foreign affairs and information in 1962, is one of the most important media stories and the novel exhibition in Syria and the Arab world, has issued his first narrative work in 1948.

Ujayli entered into and served in the government of Syria from 1947 to 1962. He served in the foreign, culture and information branches.

Ujayli had 40 books published. Among his best known works are Basima Between Tears, Hearts On Wires, The Obscure, Unknown on the Road, and Land of the Lords.

== Works ==
- The Lieutenant's Watch (ساعة الملازم, Sā'at al-mulāzim, 1951)
- Lanterns of Seville (قناديل اشبيل, Qanādil Išbīliyya, 1954)
- Basima Between Tears (باسمة بين الدموع, Bāsima bayn al-dumū, 1958)
- The Traitor (الخائن, al-Khā'in, 1960)
- Unknown on the Road (مجهولة على الطريق, Majhūlat 'alà-l-ṭarīq, 1997)
- Hearts on Wires (قلوب على الأسلاك, Qulub ealaa al'aslak, 1974)

== See also ==
- Hearts on Wires
