= Umbrella (film) =

- Traditional Chinese: 傘
- Simplified Chinese: 伞
- Hanyu Pinyin: Sǎn
- Directed by: Du Haibin
- Produced by: Ben Tsiang; Du Haibin; Hsu Hsiao-ming
- Cinematography: Liu Aiguo
- Edited by: Du Haibin; Fang Lei; Mary Stephen; Zang Jiali
- Music by: Xu Chunsong
- Distributed by: Cnex Ltd.
- Release date: September 2, 2007 (Venice)
- Running time: 93 minutes
- Country: China
- Language: Mandarin

Umbrella or Sǎn is a Chinese documentary film directed by Du Haibin and released in 2007. The film documents the experiences of modern rural China, particularly five social groups: students, soldiers, tradespeople, and peasants. Du's stated goal with the film was to highlight the growing disparity between China's prosperous cities and its stagnating countryside.

== Synopsis ==
Umbrella is divided into five parts, one for each social group documented. The first takes place in Zhongshan, in Guangdong province at an industrial warehouse where poorly paid workers spend hours putting together umbrellas for sale. In another part of China, in Yiwu, Zhejiang province, a successful farmer has become an entrepreneur, running an umbrella manufacturing business.

The film then shifts to Shanghai, as it follows students and recent graduates who struggle to find employment in a hyper-competitive market. The students know that failure to find a job will mean a return to their rural roots.

The fourth part follows a People's Liberation Army garrison and new recruits. The recruits all come from farms in the countryside, looking for another life.

The last part of the film takes place in Luoyang, Henan province. It documents an elderly peasant in a village that consists mostly of the old and infirm, as subsequent generations seek their fortunes elsewhere.

== Reception ==
Umbrella was awarded an Honorable Mention at the 30th Cinéma du Réel International Documentary Film Festival in 2008. It has also screened at numerous film festivals, including Asian and documentary-film focused lineups. Most notable was its premiere at the 64th Venice International Film Festival as part of the Horizons Documentary program. It was one of three Chinese films in the program, along with Lü Yue's documentary-drama hybrid, The Obscure, and Jia Zhangke's Useless. Collectively, the three films were said to exemplify the "overwhelming sophistication in Chinese...documentary filmmaking."
