= The State-Mafia Pact =

- Directed by: Sabina Guzzanti
- Written by: Sabina Guzzanti
- Produced by: Valerio De Paolis; Sabina Guzzanti
- Starring: Sabina Guzzanti
- Cinematography: Daniele Ciprì
- Edited by: Luca Benedetti; Matteo Spigariol
- Music by: Nicola Piovani
- Production companies: Secol Superbo e Sciocco Produzioni; QMedia
- Distributed by: BIM Distribuzione
- Release dates: 3 September 2014 (Venice); 2 October 2014 (Italy)
- Running time: 108 minutes
- Country: Italy
- Language: Italian

The State-Mafia Pact (Italian: La trattativa) is a 2014 Italian documentary film written and directed by Sabina Guzzanti, who also starred in the film. The storyline is about the State-Mafia Pact, the negotiation between Italian State and Cosa Nostra, that is supposed to be occurred after the '92-'93 bombings. It was screened out of competition at the 71st Venice International Film Festival.

== Cast ==
- Sabina Guzzanti
- Enzo Lombardo
- Ninni Bruschetta
- Filippo Luna
- Franz Cantalupo
- Claudio Castrogiovanni

== See also ==
- È Stato la mafia
- State-Mafia Pact
