= Viva Zapatero! =

- Directed by: Sabina Guzzanti
- Written by: Sabina Guzzanti
- Produced by: Andrea Occhipinti, Sabina Guzzanti
- Starring: Sabina Guzzanti
- Cinematography: Paolo Santolini
- Edited by: Clelio Benevento
- Music by: Riccardo Giagni
- Release date: 2005
- Running time: 80 min
- Country: Italy
- Language: Italian

Viva Zapatero! is a 2005 documentary by Sabina Guzzanti telling her side of the story regarding the conflict with Silvio Berlusconi over a late-night TV political satire show broadcast on Rai 3.

The show, RAIot (a play on the name of the Italian state public TV: RAI, and the English word riot), lampooned prime minister Berlusconi. Since it was not considered a satirical show, but a political one, it was cancelled after the first episode.

== Origin ==
Viva Zapatero! is titled after the famous "Viva Zapata!" and it also refers to the then Spanish Prime minister, José Luis Rodríguez Zapatero, who, immediately after gaining power in Spain in April 2004, ensured that the head of the state-run public broadcaster would no longer be a political appointee (as opposed to Italy).

== Story ==
The TV broadcasting of the satirical program RAIot was censored in November 2003 after the comedian, Sabina Guzzanti, made outspoken criticism of the Berlusconi media empire. Mediaset, one of Berlusconi's companies, sued the Italian state broadcasting company RAI because of the Guzzanti show asking for 20 million Euro for "damages" and from November 2003 she was forced to appear only in theatres around Italy.

In August 2005, it was the sleeper hit of the Venice International Film Festival, receiving a 15-minute standing ovation after its premiere screening. When it opened in Italian theaters, over 200,000 people went to see it in the first week. Its success resulted in an invitation to the 2006 Sundance Film Festival.

== Reception ==
On review aggregator website Rotten Tomatoes, the film holds an approval rating of 83% based on 23 reviews, with an average rating of 7.4/10.

== Awards ==
Official Selection – Sundance Film Festival 2006
Official Selection – Tribeca Film Festival 2006

== See also ==
- Censorship
- Fahrenheit 9/11
- Freedom of the press
- Freedom of speech
- Satire
