= Sympathy for the Lobster =

- Directed by: Sabina Guzzanti
- Cinematography: Caroline Champetier
- Production companies: Fandango; Secol Superbo e Sciocco Produzioni
- Release date: September 7, 2007 (Venice Film Festival)

Sympathy for the Lobster (Italian: Le ragioni dell'aragosta) is a 2007 Italian mockumentary film written, directed and starred by Sabina Guzzanti. The film premiered out of competition at the 64th Venice International Film Festival.

== Cast ==
- Sabina Guzzanti
- Pierfrancesco Loche
- Francesca Reggiani
- Cinzia Leone
- Antonello Fassari
- Stefano Masciarelli
- Renato Soru

== Awards ==
- Brian Award at the 64th Venice International Film Festival.
