= Draquila – L'Italia che trema =

2010 Italian documentary film

- Directed by: Sabina Guzzanti
- Produced by: Sabina Guzzanti; Valerio Terenzio; Simona Banchi; Ferdinando Vicentini Orgnani
- Starring: Sabina Guzzanti
- Release date: May 7, 2010
- Running time: 93 minutes
- Country: Italy
- Language: Italian

Draquila – L'Italia che trema is a 2010 Italian satirical documentary film about the political matters regarding the earthquake that hit the Italian city of L'Aquila in 2009. It stars the comedian Sabina Guzzanti, who also wrote and directed. It was presented out of competition at the 2010 Cannes Film Festival, causing a boycott from the Italian government.

The movie name is a portmanteau between L'Aquila and Dracula, while the subtitle Poteri speciali ad un uomo speciale ("Special powers for a special man") pertain to Guido Bertolaso, the discussed chief of Protezione Civile.

== Plot ==
Beginning from the earthquake in L'Aquila in 2009, the film investigates the way the Protezione Civile reacted to the catastrophe. It is shown as an extension of the government, not respecting the law, and putting political service above its responsibilities of the crisis. Sabina Guzzanti caricatures Prime Minister Silvio Berlusconi and is critical of the government, especially Berlusconi and Guido Bertolaso, the chief of the Protezione Civile. She presents the Italian opposition as invisible and ineffective.

== Political reaction ==
The Italian culture minister Sandro Bondi boycotted the Cannes Film Festival because of the selection of Draquila, describing it as propaganda.

Sandro Bondi's comment came well before the film was publicly shown. He later responded to criticism about him stating he had seen the film in a private screening by ultimately admitting to not having seen it at all.
