= The Camels =

- Directed by: Giuseppe Bertolucci
- Written by: Giuseppe Bertolucci; Vincenzo Cerami
- Cinematography: Fabio Cianchetti
- Edited by: Nino Baragli
- Music by: Nicola Piovani
- Release date: 1988
- Running time: 100 minutes
- Country: Italy
- Language: Italian

The Camels (Italian: I cammelli) is a 1988 Italian comedy film written and directed by Giuseppe Bertolucci.

== Plot ==
Ferruccio Ferri is a young man passionate about camels from Carpi who manages to win for four weeks in a row in a quiz program of a local television. The manager Camillo tries to capture the ephemeral popularity of Ferruccio and arranges for him and Miriam, a wacky and off-key singer, a tour along an improbable journey by camel across the entire Po Valley.

== Cast ==
- Paolo Rossi as Ferruccio Ferri
- Diego Abatantuono as Camillo
- Giulia Boschi as Anna Moretti
- Sabina Guzzanti as Miriam
- Ennio Fantastichini as Pino
- Laura Betti as Anna's mother
- Giancarlo Sbragia as Anna's father
- Claudio Bisio as Service-station attendant
