= Natale a cinque stelle =

- Film poster
- Directed by: Marco Risi
- Written by: Enrico Vanzina
- Starring: Massimo Ghini; Ricky Memphis; Martina Stella; Paola Minaccioni; Massimo Ciavarro; Andrea Osvárt; Riccardo Rossi; Biagio Izzo; Ralph Palka
- Distributed by: Netflix
- Release date: December 7, 2018
- Running time: 100 minutes
- Country: Italy
- Language: Italian

Natale a cinque stelle (lit. 'Five-star Christmas') is a 2018 Italian Christmas comedy film directed by Marco Risi, starring Massimo Ghini, Ricky Memphis and Andrea Osvárt.

It was released worldwide by Netflix on 7 December 2018.

== Plot ==
An Italian political delegation is on an official visit to Hungary. Secretly, the Premier also has plans for spending time with a young member of the delegation. Problems arise when a corpse turns up in the suite of the luxurious hotel where they stay.

== Cast ==
- Massimo Ghini as Franco Rispoli
- Ricky Memphis as Walter Bianchini
- Martina Stella as Giulia Rossi
- Paola Minaccioni as Marisa Rispoli
- Andrea Osvárt as Berta Molnar
- Riccardo Rossi as Mariano Tozzi
- Massimo Ciavarro as Roberto
- Biagio Izzo as Pasquale
- Ralph Palka as Hotel Manager
- Roberta Fiorentini as Walter's Mother
- Rocco Siffredi as Himself

== Distribution ==
It was distributed through the Netflix streaming service from 7 December 2018.

== See also ==
- List of Christmas films
