= Paolo Guzzanti =

Italian journalist and politician (born 1940)

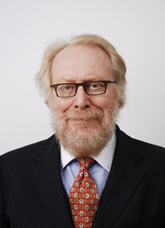

Member of the Chamber of Deputies
- In office 29 April 2008 – 14 March 2013
- Constituency: Latium 1

Member of the Senate of the Republic
- In office 30 May 2001 – 28 April 2008
- Constituency: Lombardy-Brescia (2001–2006); Latium (2006–2008)

Personal details
- Born: 1 August 1940 (age 85) Rome, Italy
- Political party: PSI (until 1994); PS (1994); Forza Italia (1994–2009); PLI (2010; since 2023); Forza Italia (2014–2016); RL (2016)
- Children: 6, including Sabina, Corrado and Caterina
- Relatives: Elio Guzzanti (uncle)
- Occupation: Journalist

Paolo Guzzanti (born 1 August 1940) is an Italian journalist and politician.

== Early life ==
Born in Rome, Guzzanti is the nephew of Elio Guzzanti and father to actors Corrado, Sabina, and Caterina. As a journalist, he worked for Avanti!, La Repubblica (of which he was a co-founder), and La Stampa. He also hosted the first season of the Chi l'ha visto? TV show. He is an editorialist of Paolo Berlusconi's Il Giornale; he was deputy director before and for Panorama, also owned by Berlusconi.

== Career ==
Guzzanti was elected to the Italian Parliament for Forza Italia. From 2002 to 2006, he was president of the Mitrokhin Commission, a parliamentary commission that was entrusted by the centre-right coalition majority with investigating the role of the KGB in Italy. Since the very beginning, the commission received criticism, as it was mentioned that its main role seemed only that to discredit the former Italian Communist Party and the centre-left coalition opposition. According to an interview of former KGB agent Yevgeny Limarev published in La Repubblica, Italian left-wing politicians to be discredited included Romano Prodi, Massimo D'Alema, and Alfonso Pecoraro Scanio. The commission was closed in 2006 without results. According to the opposition, which submitted its own minority report, this hypothesis was false, and the purpose of the commission was therefore to discredit him. The KGB allegations related to him were rejected by Prodi. Former Federal Security Service (FSB) officer Alexander Litvinenko also said that FSB deputy chief Anatoly Trofimov "did not exactly say that Prodi was a KGB agent, because the KGB avoids using that word."

On 1 December 2006, Mario Scaramella, a contact of Litvinenko, tested positive for polonium-210. Scaramella was involved in the Italian parliamentary inquiry into KGB activity and was sufficiently worried by the contents of an e-mail to ask for advice from Litvinenko. The e-mail said that Guzzanti, Litvinenko, and Scaramella were possible targets for assassination. Around the same period, there was the publication of telephone interceptions between Guzzanti and Scaramella. In the wiretaps, Guzzanti made it clear that the true intent of the Mitrokhin Commission was to support the hypothesis that Prodi would have been an agent financed or in any case manipulated by Moscow and the KGB. As a result, Scaramella was charged for calumny. The Mitrokhin Commission was not able to prove any of the allegations and was closed and succeeded in 2006 by a new commission to determinate whether the allegations were politically motivated. In a December 2006 interview given to the television program La storia siamo noi, colonel ex-KGB agent Oleg Gordievsky, who was Scaramella's source, confirmed the accusations made against Scaramella regarding the production of false material relating to Prodi and other Italian politicians, and underlined their lack of reliability.

From 2008 to 2013, Guzzanti served as a deputy of Forza Italia.

In 2009, Guzzanti published a book, in which he reiterated the allegations against Prodi and stated that Litvinenko told the Mitrokhin Commission about a connection between Prodi and the KGB/FSB. He believed that Litvinenko was killed because of the Mitrokhin Commission and that Vladimir Putin had an interest in ruining the commission. On 2 February 2009, he left The People of Freedom and joined the Italian Liberal Party. He was elected deputy secretary on 20 February.
