= Roberta Fiorentini =

Italian actress

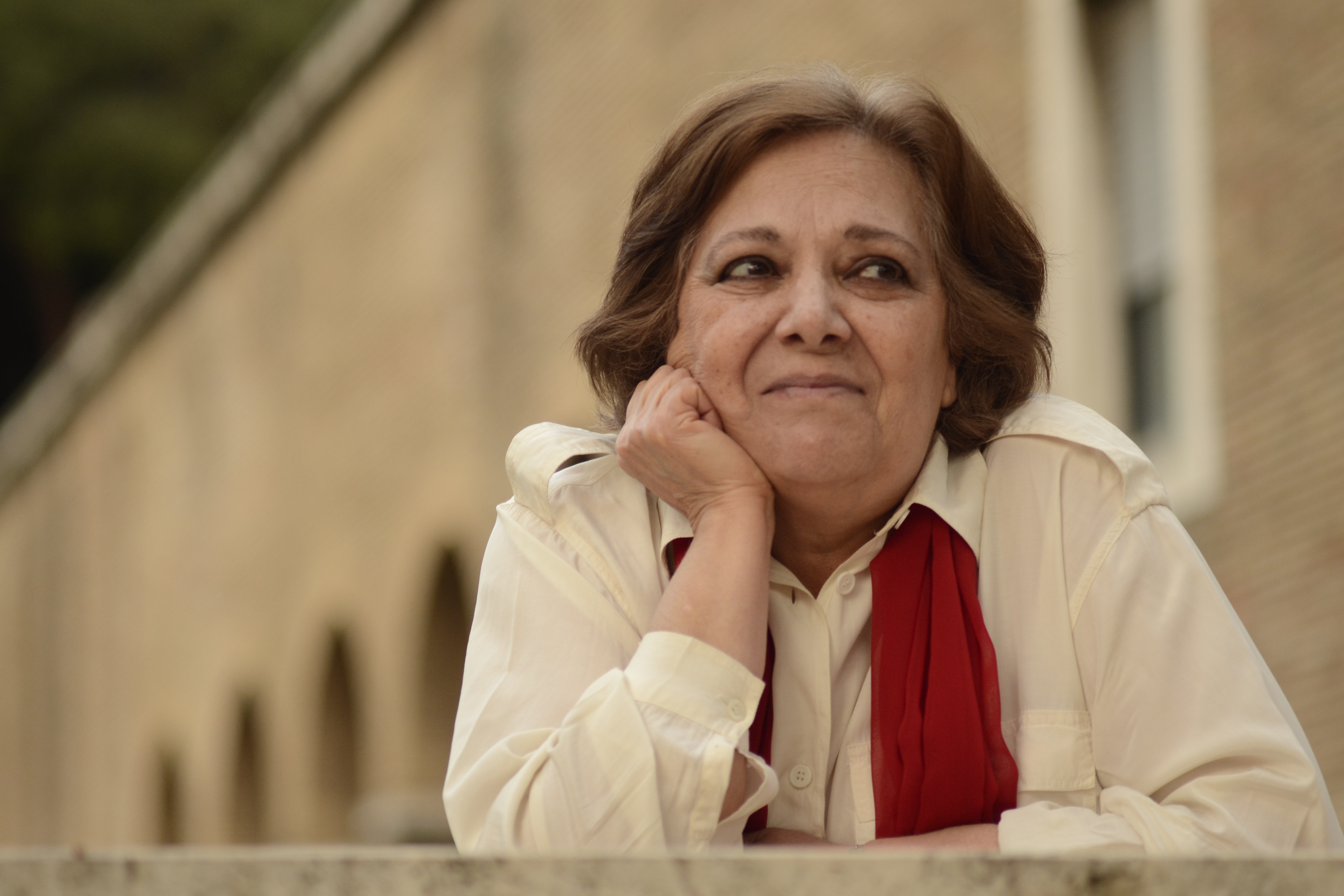
- Fiorentini in 2018
- Born: 22 November 1948; Rome, Italy
- Died: 23 October 2019 (aged 70); Porta Portese neighborhood, Rome, Italy
- Resting place: Flaminio cemetery
- Occupation: Actress
- Father: Fiorenzo Fiorentini

Roberta Fiorentini (22 November 1948 – 23 October 2019) was an Italian actress and teacher at the Fiorenzo Fiorentini School of Popular Theater. Her breakout role was the character of Itala in the television series Boris.

== Early life ==
Fiorentini was born in Rome, Italy on November 22, 1948. She was the daughter of Fiorenzo Fiorentini and Lia Alimena. She was the founder and teacher for twelve years of the Fiorenzo Fiorentini School of Popular Theater at the Petrolini Theater in Testaccio, Rome.

== Career ==
She worked for more than thirty years in the theater. She appeared in dozens of films and television series. Her fame began with her portrayal of Itala, the editorial secretary in the television series Boris, directed by Luca Vendruscolo, Mattia Torre and Giacomo Ciarrapico.

Her film appearances include The Family Friend by Paolo Sorrentino (Rosalba's mother), Me, Myself and Her by Maria Sole Tognazzi (Sabrina Ferilli's mother), A Fairy-Tale Wedding, Henry, and SMS - Sotto Mentite Spoglie (Enrico Brignano's mother). She appeared in Natale a cinque stelle (mother of the character played by Ricky Memphis).

After a long illness, she died in the Porta Portese neighborhood, where she had lived for some time, in Rome on 23 October 2019. She was buried in Flaminio cemetery.
