= La pecora nera (2010 film) =

2010 film

- Directed by: Ascanio Celestini
- Written by: Ascanio Celestini; Ugo Chiti; Wilma Labate
- Produced by: Alessandra Acciai
- Starring: Maya Sansa
- Cinematography: Daniele Ciprì
- Edited by: Giogiò Franchini
- Release date: 2 September 2010 (Venice)
- Running time: 93 minutes
- Country: Italy
- Language: Italian

La pecora nera (Eng: The Black Sheep) is a 2010 Italian comedy film directed by Ascanio Celestini. The film was nominated for the Golden Lion at the 67th Venice International Film Festival. The film is based on a book by the title, also written by Ascanio Celestini.

== Plot ==
La pecora nera is the story of Nicola, who for 35 years has lived in a psychiatric hospital, in contact with those he prefers to call "saints" instead of mad people. Retracing the story of the protagonist since he was a child, the film shows a cross-sections of the life of mentally ill people in Italy, from the "fabulous" 1960s, up until the present day, in which the world of the institution in which Nicola lives is not all so different from the outside world.

== Cast ==
- Maya Sansa as Marinella
- Giorgio Tirabassi as Ascanio
- Luisa De Santis
- Ascanio Celestini as Nicola
- Barbara Valmorin

== See also ==
- Cinema of Italy
- 2010 in film
- Italian films of 2010
