= Giorgio Tirabassi =

Italian actor and director (born 1960)

- Born: 1 February 1960 (age 66); Rome, Italy
- Occupation: Actor
- Website: giorgiotirabassi.it

Giorgio Tirabassi (born 1 February 1960) is an Italian film, television, and stage actor, as well as director.

== Life and career ==
Born in Rome, Tirabassi made his debut as an actor in avant-garde theatre and then worked at the Teatro Stabile di Catania. Since 1982, he has been a member of the stage company of Gigi Proietti.

His breakout role was the inspector Ardenzi in the Canale 5 crime TV-series Distretto di Polizia.

In 2001, he made his directorial debut with the short Non dire gatto, winning a David di Donatello for Best Short Film. In 2011, he won a Ciak d'oro for best supporting actor for his performance in Ascanio Celestini's La pecora nera.

Tirabassi is also a singer and is the lead vocalist in the band Music Inn.

On 1 November 2019, Tirabassi suffered a heart attack while presenting his first film as director. He was hospitalized in stable condition and recovered in a short time.

== Selected filmography ==
- Kaputt Mundi (1998)
- The Dinner (1998)
- Bell'amico (2002)
- Paz! (2002)
- Don't Make Any Plans for Tonight (2006)
- Boris (2007–2010)
- La pecora nera (2010)
- Unlikely Revolutionaries (2010)
- Boris: The Film (2011)
- Piazza Fontana: The Italian Conspiracy (2012)
- Arance e martello (2014)
- Il camionista (2016)
- Freaks Out (2020)
- The Great Ambition (2024)

== Awards and recognition ==
- 2002: David di Donatello for Best Short Film for Non dire gatto.
