= Corrado Guzzanti =

Italian actor, director, writer, and satirist (born 1965)

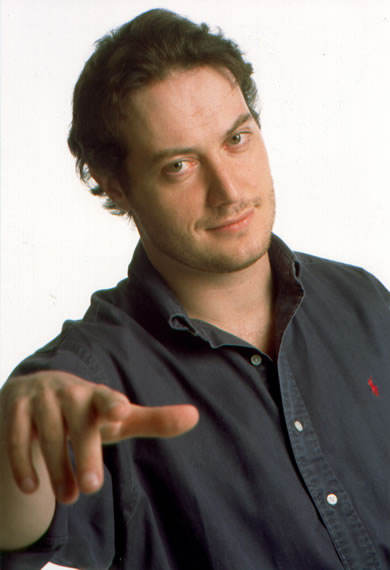
- Guzzanti in the 2000s
- Born: 17 May 1965 (age 61); Rome, Italy
- Occupations: Actor; director; writer; satirist
- Parent: Paolo Guzzanti (father)
- Relatives: Sabina Guzzanti (sister); Caterina Guzzanti (sister)
- Awards: Forte dei Marmi Political Satire Award (2010)(2019); Wind Music Awards Special Prize (2013)
- Website: https://www.instagram.com/corradoguzzanti/

Corrado Guzzanti (born 17 May 1965) is an Italian satirical actor, director, screenwriter, comedian and impersonator. He has become famous both for his impersonations of Italian personalities (politicians, journalists, entertainment and television celebrities), and for playing his own characters inspired by contemporary society. He is the director of the film Fascisti su Marte (Fascists on Mars, 2006). In 2010 he received the "Forte dei Marmi Political Satire Award". He has been described as a genius of satirical comedy, "the most interesting satirical author and actor today", and "among the comedians best loved by the Italian public".

== Biography ==
=== Early life and education ===
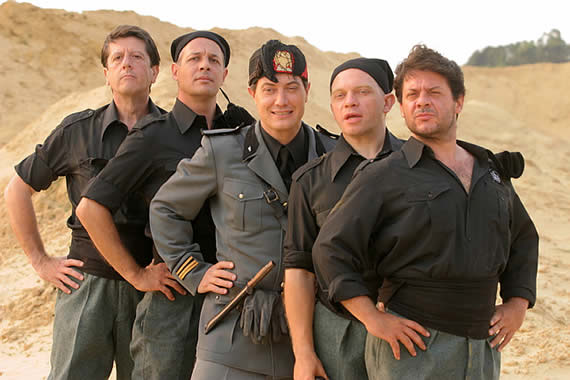
Guzzanti and the cast of Fascisti su Marte

Born in Rome, he is the son of journalist and Senator Paolo Guzzanti, great-nephew of former Minister of Health Elio Guzzanti, and brother of Sabina and Caterina, both also satirical actresses and occasional collaborators. He is an atheist.

=== Beginnings ===
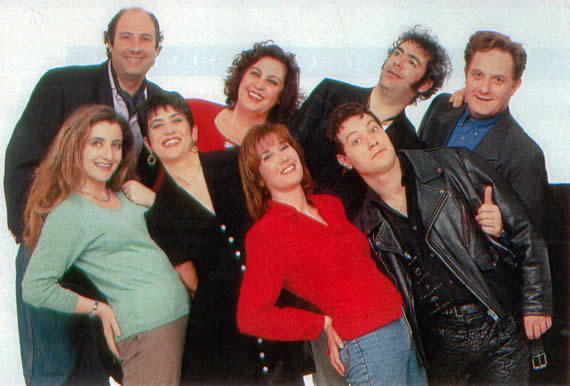
Serena Dandini (front, second from left) and Corrado Guzzanti (front, right) as Rokko Smithersons with the team of Avanzi (Leftovers) in 1991

He started in the theatre as a writer of texts for his sister Sabina. In 1988 he began a collaboration with Antonio Ricci, director for Mediaset. In 1989 he was an actor in the satirical theatre company of Serena Dandini, Valentina Amurri and Linda Brunetta for the Italian public broadcasting network in the programme La TV delle ragazze (Girls' TV). With the same troupe he participated in the creation of the television programme Avanzi (Leftovers) (1991-1993). This cult programme is ranked among the most innovative of that time. Corrado Guzzanti made a name for himself with his impersonation of Vittorio Sgarbi, a controversial art historian, of Gianni Minoli, a journalist close to the then prime minister, the socialist Bettino Craxi, and above all with Rokko Smithersons, a fictional horror film director. In every sketch, Smithersons used to deliver the script of "one of his recent films", which was in fact a parodic summary of Italian political events.

=== Partnership with Serena Dandini ===
The collaboration with Serena Dandini lasted several years. In all their programmes, Dandini plays the "stooge" to Guzzanti, who stages a vast series of characters.

From 1993 onwards, the sketches of the two Guzzanti siblings are focused on political news: at that time, the Italian justice system is involved in the investigation Mani pulite (clean hands), which ends with the fall of the First Republic, while Silvio Berlusconi announces his "descent into the playing field". While Sabina specialised in imitating Silvio Berlusconi himself, Corrado imitates second-tier figures in the Italian Socialist Party, such as Ugo Intini, who is seen running after terrified citizens, promising that "politics is ready to change".

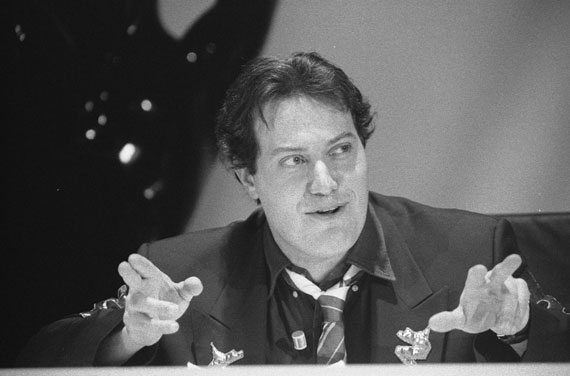
Corrado Guzzanti impersonates the journalist of Mediaset Emilio Fede.

Another impersonation who makes Guzzanti's fortune is Emilio Fede, a presenter on TG4, a Berlusconi loyalist. In Guzzanti's impersonation, Fede kidnaps the eight-year-old son of another television executive, in order to extort exclusive rights to football matches from him.

In 1997, in the programme "Pippo Chennedy Show", Guzzanti created another fictional character, Pippo Chennedy, who represents the "worst of the worst" of TV presenters. In fact, Chennedy does not hesitate to ruin the reputation of shy and awkward guests, by putting them in very uncomfortable situations, in order to increase his audience.

Today, women do the jobs that Italians no longer want to do.
Oggi le donne fanno i lavori che gli italiani non vogliono più fare.

— C. Guzzanti, Brunello Robertetti

One of his most successful crafted characters is the poet Brunello Robertetti, the satire of a pseudo-profound intellectual, whose recited poems are nothing but repeats of proverbs, clichés and famous poems, rewritten in abruzzese dialect.

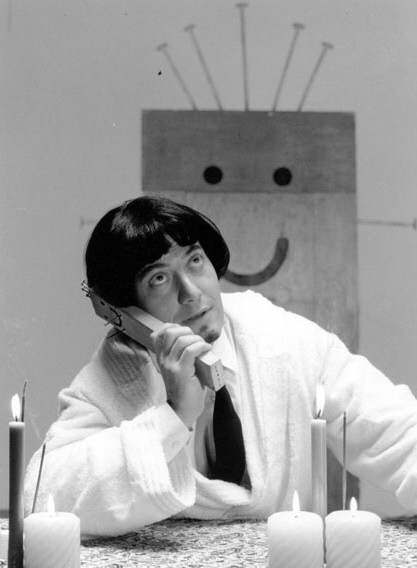
Corrado Guzzanti plays Quelo.

The answer is within you. Yet, it is false!
La risposta è dentro di te. Però è sbagliata!

— C. Guzzanti, Quelo

Another emblematic character is Quelo (That One), a pseudo-priest who carried the word of a new god, from which he took his name, represented by a wooden tablet with nails in place of limbs and facial features drawn to replicate an emoticon-like smile. Scene after scene, Quelo is revealed as a simple family man from Apulia, trying to escape the problems of real life ranging from his wife's marital infidelity to the physical frailty of his daughter, who in every episode vomited profusely on someone or something.

The Left must not govern, because the Left is play, entertainment, fantasy.
La Sinistra non deve governare. La Sinistra è gioco, è divertimento, è fantasia.

— C.Guzzanti, Fausto Bertinotti

In the following programmes, still hosted by Serena Dandini, Guzzanti focused on imitating centre-left and far-left politicians, who were in government at the time but were experiencing strong internal tensions. In his imitation, the center-left leader Francesco Rutelli was a wannabe American-like politician, whereas the far-left leader Fausto Bertinotti was portrayed as a dandy obsessed with fashion, who liked to wake up his colleagues in the middle of the night to go and throw water balloons on Prime Minister Romano Prodi. The latter was presented, on the other hand, as the ghost of himself: he was said to have died in 1974, but continued his activities as a "true Christian democrat, floating between life and death, without offending either".

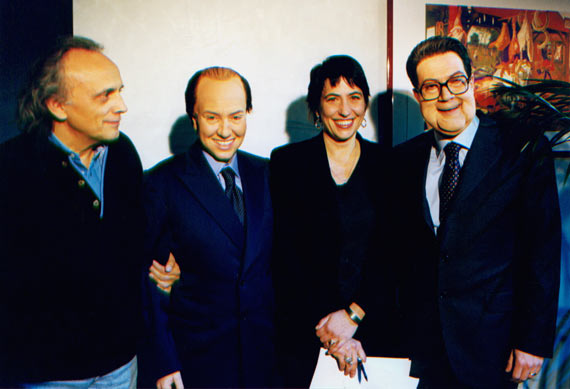
Sabina Guzzanti (second from left) imitates Silvio Berlusconi, Serena Dandini (centre), author and partner, Corrado Guzzanti (right) dressed as Romano Prodi (2007).

In 2000, when Berlusconi's movement took the name Casa della libertà (House of Freedom), Guzzanti produced a series of parody advertisements in which the protagonists violated the most basic rules of decorum and civic sense. The episode in which he urinates on a couch is particularly remembered.

=== Scafroglia Case ===
In 2002, Guzzanti directed his first personal television project, Il caso Scafroglia (The Scafroglia Case), a pseudo-journalistic programme based on the investigation into the disappearance of Mario Scafroglia, a fictional character. Always conducted with friend and colleague Marco Marzocca, the series saw the participation of artists such as Fiorella Mannoia and Antonio Albanese.

The presenter, played by Guzzanti, starting from Scafroglia's disappearance, analysed the Italian political situation, characterised at the time by the presence of Silvio Berlusconi as Prime Minister. His reflections are interspersed with sketches in which Guzzanti proposes an imitation of the then Minister of Finance, Giulio Tremonti (presented as a squanderer of public money and a gambler) and new caricatures, such as the Mafioso, portrayed in his arrogance and powers not weakened by his imprisonment; the Mason in a balaclava taking stock of the progress of the plans of his Masonic lodge – which referred to Propaganda Due; Vulvia, an imaginary character representing the flirtatious and ignorant presenter of a science programme; the fictional Fascist hierarch Gaetano Maria Barbagli, leader of a handful of men who set out to conquer the red planet Mars.

=== Fascists on Mars ===
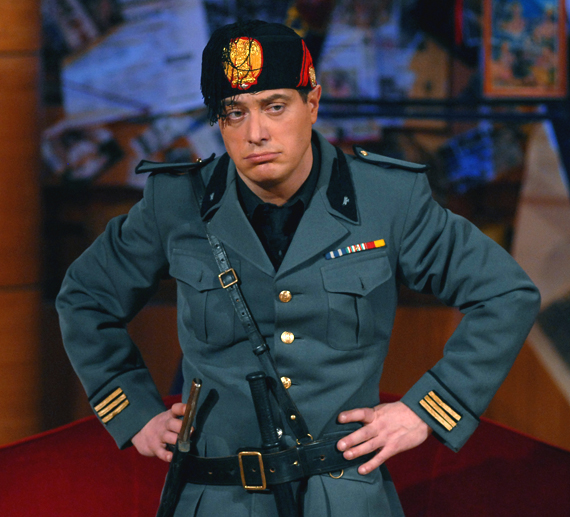
Corrado Guzzanti is the imaginary Fascist hierarch Gaetano Maria Barbagli.

Dictatorship is a system to oppress the people. Democracy is a system to force the people to oppress themselves
La dittatura è un sistema per opprimere il popolo. La democrazia è un sistema per costringere il popolo a opprimersi da solo.

— C.Guzzanti, Fascists on Mars

The sketches for Fascists on Mars, which were part of the Caso Scafroglia, were shown at the 60th Venice International Film Festival that same year. Guzzanti then decided to make it into a film and reduced his television appearances considerably. The film, which competed at the 2006 Rome Film Festival in the Extra section and was subsequently released on the big screen the same year, tells the story of the invasion, by a small unit of black shirts, of the red planet, inhabited by the Mimmi, round stones over which Barbagli and his men try in vain to impose their authority. Guzzanti, the film's director and narrator (with the style of narration typical of the news commentators of the Istituto Luce's Newsreel at the time of the dictatorship), had exploited the vicissitudes of the protagonists for a final analysis of the differences between the Fascist regime of the time and Berlusconi's 'soft dictatorship'.

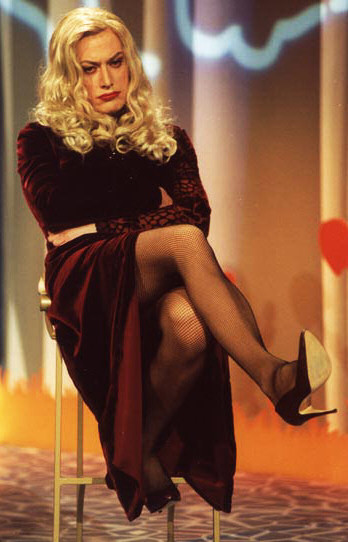
Guzzanti plays fictional character Vulvia, the presenter of an imaginary science programme "Rieducational Channel".

=== Series and movies ===
After the judicial events that had seen his sister Sabina ostracized by Mediaset, he appeared more and more rarely on public television and chose to work for Sky Italia.

In particular, he participated in the highly successful television series Boris, where he played two characters at the same time: Mariano Giusti, a frustrated actor with psychotic tendencies, and Padre Gabrielli, a fake priest affiliated with the Camorra.

He also continued his experience as a film actor, in the film La passione by Carlo Mazzacurati, for which he received two nominations respectively for the Ciak d'Oro and the Kineo award.

In 2010 he received the Prize for Political Satire of Forte dei Marmi.

In his very few appearances on Italian public television, Guzzanti will continue to alternate lighter, frivolous characters with more politically based interventions.

The truth is that I called because I feel very lonely. Can I call you tomorrow?
La verità è che ho chiamato perché mi sento molto solo. Posso richiamare domani?

— C.Guzzanti, Mauro Masi

In 2011, as the director general of Italian public television Mauro Masi called the journalist Michele Santoro live to "reprimand" him about his report on Silvio Berlusconi, the next day Corrado Guzzanti called Serena Dandini live during her show Parla con me, parodying the general manager's intervention.

=== Return with Aniene ===
In 2011, he returned to television, still on Sky Italia, with Aniene, where he proposes new characters such as Aniene (who gives the name to the program), a superhero sent to Earth by his Father, to restore order among humans. He also reintroduces already known characters, such as the impersonation of the singer Antonello Venditti, the Mason, the Mafioso (who celebrates 150 years of the Mafia instead of the unification of Italy), and Father Florestano Pizzarro, a powerful priest who is in fact, a nihilist and candidly admits to having worn the cassock for mere convenience.

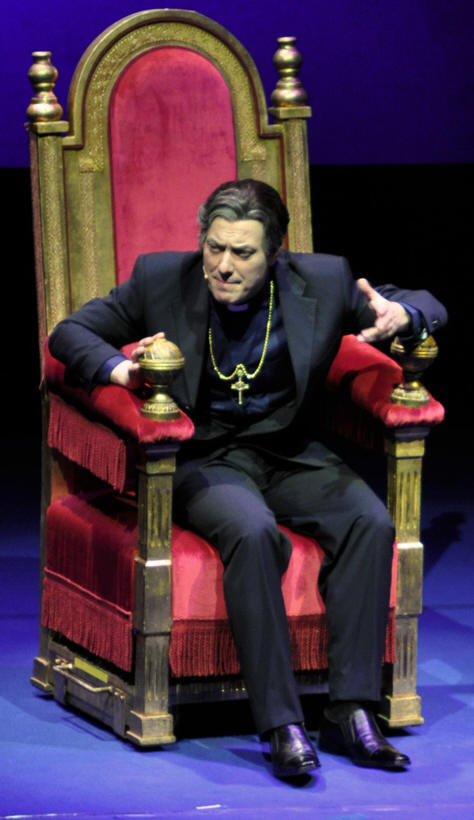
Guzzanti plays the imaginary character Father Florestano Pizzarro.

This great, resounding indifference of Nature and the Universe – I call it 'God'. That's a shorter name, isn't it?
Questa grande, clamorosa indifferenza della Natura e dell'Universo, io la chiamo Dio. Che come nome è anche più breve, no?

— C. Guzzanti, Father Pizzarro

In January 2013, Guzzanti was denounced by the Aiart (Association of Catholic viewers) for "having offended the religious feeling of Italians with barrack jokes", following the broadcast on public channel La7 of the play Recital, in which he played the role of Father Pizzarro. In Guzzanti's defence, the director of the newspaper Articolo21 Stefano Corradino launched a petition on Change.org, which gathered about 54,000 signatures in a few weeks. At the end of the case, Corrado Guzzanti wrote a letter of thanks in which, among other things, he analysed the interference of religion on Italian cultural life, "which offended his secular feeling".

Also in 2013 he received the Special Prize of the Wind Music Awards for his show Aniene.

In 2014, he acted in the comedy Ogni maledetto Natale, in which, like all the actors in the film, he plays two different roles in the two main families: the Colardo family's uncle Sauro and Filipino Benji who works for the Marinelli family.

In 2015, he played the role of Carabinieri marshal Carmelo La Mattina in the film A Bigger Splash by Luca Guadagnino.

On 25 May 2016, Guzzanti returned to television on SKY with a 4-part series Dov'é Mario?(Where is Mario?), in which he plays a famous snobbish intellectual, Mario Bambea, who, after a serious car accident, begins to suffer from a split personality, allowing his alter ego Bizio Capoccetti, a crude and vulgar comic, to emerge.

In 2018 he joined the cast of the series Murders at Barlume (in its fifth season), where he plays the Venetian insurance agent Paolo Pasquali.

In 2022 he participated in the programme LOL2 Italia.

In 2023, Guzzanti portrayed a fictionalized version of himself in season 1, episode 1 of the Sky Atlantic TV series Call My Agent - Italia.
