= The Obscure =

Cocktail bar in Los Angeles

Coordinates: 34.0401°N 118.2309°W

The Obscure Distillery & Cocktail Experience
- Interactive map of The Obscure Distillery & Cocktail Experience
- Address: Los Angeles, California; United States
- Owner: Théron Regnier
- Type: Cocktail bar, distillery

Website
- experience.theobscure.com

The Obscure Distillery & Cocktail Experience is a Los Angeles, California based cocktail bar and distillery where patrons are encouraged to dress in all black. The Obscure is the first cocktail bar to be owned and operated by a distillery.

== American Chestnut Restoration ==
The Obscure Distillery works in hand with The American Chestnut Foundation by creating two spirits using the wood of a functionally extinct tree.

Imbibe Magazine says "The Obscure Distillery in Los Angeles uses staves of American chestnut, coupled with an alternative aging technology, to create Rites of Fall rye whiskey. The American chestnut was almost wiped out in the early 20th century due to blight, but survives in small pockets. Distillery founder Théron Regnier works with the American Chestnut Foundation to get trimmings to use for Rites of Fall, donating 10 percent of bottle sales back to the nonprofit.

'It’s a reimagination of what rye can be,' Regnier says, noting apricot, citrus, and a distinctive nutty finish on the whiskey. 'It’s really shocking.' At The Obscure Distillery, bar director Hope Ewing uses Rites of Fall in the Kingmaker cocktail, which also features Suze, apricot liqueur, manzanilla sherry, and pineau des Charentes."

== Direct to Consumer Advocacy ==
The Obscure Distillery challenged the New York State Liquor Authority on a prohibition era liquor law.

Food & Wine writes about it saying "A Los Angeles craft distillery is challenging the New York State Liquor Authority in federal court. And it’s a case that could have broader implications for alcohol distribution in the United States...The Obscure Distillery’s filing highlights restrictions on which out-of-state distilleries can and cannot ship to consumers in New York. In August 2024, New York Governor Kathy Hochul signed Senate Bill S2852A, expanding the capacity of the state’s small spirits, cider, and mead producers to ship directly to consumers. The law also outlines restrictions on certain out-of-state retailers, preventing them from shipping directly to New York residents...In its filing on April 16, 2025, The Obscure Distillery alleges that because California and New York do not share shipping reciprocity, it cannot obtain an 'out-of-state direct shipper’s license.' The filing argues that this prevents it and similar businesses from facing an unconstitutional ban on interstate commerce."

== Critical reception ==
Forbes writer Kaila Yu says "This cult-favorite drinking experience in the Arts District offers a mystical, two-hour guided cocktail tasting built around experimental spirits, storytelling and dark magic vibes. Obscure Distillery’s candlelit, bayou-inspired space features waterfalls, live painting from local artists and a multisensory escape. Distiller Théron Regnier and beverage director Hope Ewing lead guests through cocktails made with experimental spirits, while a host shares tales, legends and histories behind the ingredients and flavors."

The Los Angeles Times writes "This guided experience in the Arts District embraces a mystical atmosphere year-round with a candlelit, spirit-fueled setting. Each ticket affords you six drinks, including three house distillates and three original cocktails, with live art and storytelling throughout. Taste the original menu by selecting Season 1 when purchasing tickets, or try Season 2 with six new pours and a fresh story, or Season 3, a just-released continuation of the lore with new surprises. All-black attire is encouraged and each session lasts two hours."

The Miami Herald said, "Part of the allure of The Obscure is the mystery. I won’t give too much away, but I can tell you that you’re required to dress in all black and be sure to arrive on time."

Pacific Legal Foundation wrote, "The Obscure’s tasting room feels more like the set of a theatrical production. Candlelight illuminates the way through dark, cavernous ruins lined with lava walls and waterfalls. When visitors enter, they are handed a tarot card and led to their seat, where their two-hour cocktail adventure begins."

USC Annenberg Media reported, "A night at The Obscure is one of those unique experiences that could only exist in a city as hungry for entertainment as Los Angeles.
