= Caterina Guzzanti =

Italian satirist and actress

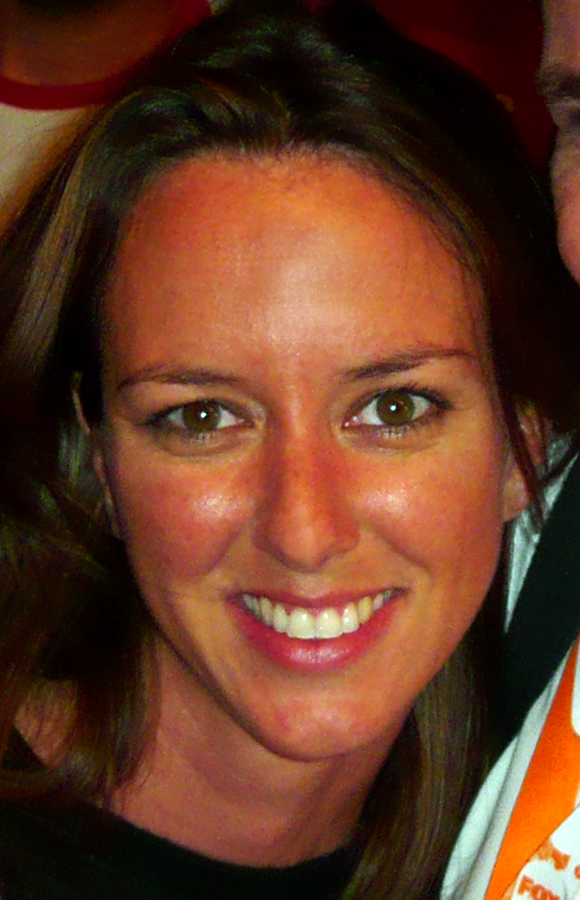
- Caterina Guzzanti in 2008
- Born: 5 June 1976 (age 48); Rome, Italy
- Occupation(s): Satirist, Actress,
- Height: 1.70 m (5 ft 7 in)
- Parent: Paolo Guzzanti
- Relatives: Sabina Guzzanti (sister); Corrado Guzzanti (brother)

Caterina Guzzanti (born 5 June 1976) is an Italian satirist and actress. She is best known for her role in the celebrated television series "Boris".

== Biography ==
She is the daughter of former Member of Parliament Paolo Guzzanti, and the sister of Sabina and Corrado Guzzanti, both also skilled satirists and occasional collaborators.

== Career ==
She debuted in 1997 in the Pippo Chennedy Show, created and hosted by her brother Corrado Guzzanti.

From 2007 to 2010, she starred in the three seasons of the TV series Boris.

In 2012, she participated in the program Un due tre stella, hosted by her sister Sabina Guzzanti, where she played for the first time the character of Vichi, a parody of a militant girl of the far-right movement CasaPound.

In November 2013, she came back to work with Stefano Bollani in the final episode of the second season of the TV show Sostiene Bollani, on the Sunday late night on RAI 3. Since March 2013, she led the MT show La prova dell'otto. In 2021, she participated as a competitor in the Italian comedy show LOL - Chi ride è fuori.

== Filmography ==
=== Film ===
Year	Title	Role(s)	Notes
1998	We'll Really Hurt You	Verde	
2002	Bimba - È clonata una stella	Rachele	
2003	Adored	Koka	
2006	Fascisti su Marte	Amazon	Cameo appearance
2008	Your Whole Life Ahead of You	Fabiana	
2009	Feisbum: The Movie	Vera	
2009	Oggi sposi	Officer Ghedini	
2011	Boris: The Film	Arianna Dell'Arti	
2011	Escort in Love	Sofia	
2014	Pane e burlesque	Frida	
2014	Soap Opera	Patrizia	
2014	Happily Mixed Up	Betta	
2014	Ogni maledetto Natale	Antonella / Tiziana	
2018	Ti presento Sofia	Adriana	
2019	Modalità aereo	Maria	
2019	Mollami	Elisabetta	
2020	Burraco fatale	Miranda	
2023	Elf Me	Brina	

=== Television ===
Year	Title	Role(s)	Notes
2007–2010, 2022	Boris	Arianna Dell'Arti	Main role
2011	Dove la trovi una come me?	Carla	Television film
2012	Il restauratore	Agent Patrizia Vannini	Main role (season 1)
2014	Amore oggi	Alice Mannolo	Television film
2016	Come fai sbagli	Laura Breviteri	Main role
2019	Liberi tutti	Martina	Main role (season 1)
2021	LOL - Chi ride è fuori	Contestant	Reality show (season 1)
2022	Carlo & Malik	Elisa Cori	Main role (season 3)
