= Katy Louise Saunders =

English-Colombian actress (born 1984)

- Born: July 21, 1984 (age 42); London, England
- Education: Bocconi University – Business and Economics
- Occupation: Actress
- Years active: 2002–2018
- Spouse: Song Joong-ki (m. 2023)
- Children: 2

Katy Louise Saunders (born July 21, 1984) is an English–Colombian former actress who was mainly active in Italy.

== Early life ==
Saunders was born in London, England to a British father and Colombian mother, and spent her childhood between London and Italy due to her father's work. She attended the English School in Rome and settled permanently in Milan with her family at the age of 14. She later graduated from faculty of Business and Economics at Bocconi University. She has a brother.

== Career ==
Saunders made her acting debut in 2002 with the film A Journey Called Love by Michele Placido, in which she played Sibilla Aleramo as a child, while the following year she appeared briefly in The Lizzie McGuire Movie. In 2004 she became popular thanks to Luca Lucini's Three Steps Over Heaven, where she played Babi, a bourgeois girl who falls in love with bad boy Step (Riccardo Scamarcio): the movie was a cult among Italian teenagers in the 2000s and catapulted her to stardom. Also in 2004 she was Valentina in What Will Happen to Us by Giovanni Veronesi. The following year she appeared for the first time on television in the Rai 1 miniseries Il Grande Torino directed by Claudio Bonivento, in which she played Susanna.

In 2007 she starred together with Scamarcio and Laura Chiatti in Ho voglia di te directed by Luis Prieto, a sequel to Three Steps Over Heaven; in the same year she also appeared in the Hollywood production Virgin Territory. The following year, she appeared together with George Clooney in the Nespresso commercial The Capsule directed by Guy Ritchie and produced by McCann Paris. In 2011, Saunders starred with Roberto Farnesi in the television series Non smettere di sognare, while in 2014 she was part of the cast of Sapore di te. She then took a two-year break from acting to launch a startup to produce organic fruit juices and vegetable concentrates.

== Personal life ==
On January 30, 2023, South Korean actor Song Joong-ki announced through his fan cafe that he had married Saunders, who was already pregnant with their first child. On June 14, 2023, Saunders gave birth to a son at a hospital in Rome. On July 8, 2024, it was reported that the couple was expecting their second child. On November 20, 2024, Song announced the birth of their daughter. Saunders lives in Seoul and Tuscany, Italy with her husband and children.

== Filmography ==
=== Film ===
Year	Title	Role	Notes
2002	A Journey Called Love	Young Sibilla	
2003	The Lizzie McGuire Movie	Italian girl	
2004	What Will Happen to Us	Valentina	
2004	Three Steps Over Heaven	Babi	
2006	The Borgia	Giulia Farnese	
2006	Salty Air	Emma	
2007	Ho voglia di te	Babi	
2007	Piazza di Spagna		Short film
2007	Silk	Brothel hostess	
2007	Virgin Territory	Sister Maddalena	
2011	Lucrezia Borgia	Lucrezia Borgia	Short film
2013	Third Person	Gina	
2014	Sapore di te	Sabrina Proietti	
2014	#Illusion	Tamara	Short film
2016	On Air: Storia di un successo	Stefania Pittaluga	
2018	The Scorpion King: Book of Souls	Amina	
2018	Welcome Home	Alessandra	

=== Television ===
Year	Title	Role	Notes	Ref.
2004	Law & Order	Naomi	Season 15, Episode 4: "Coming Down Hard"	
2005	Il Grande Torino	Susanna Egre	Television film	
2009	Sisi	Ida Ferenczy	Miniseries	
2010	Restless Heart: The Confessions of Saint Augustine	Lucilla	Miniseries	
2011	Non smettere di sognare	Giorgia	Main cast, 8 episodes	
2018	Condor	Mariana	"Mistrust Blossoms"	
