= Sisi (miniseries) =

2009 Austrian-Italian-German TV miniseries

- Written by: Ivan Cotroneo; Monica Rametta; Christiane Sadlo
- Directed by: Xaver Schwarzenberger
- Starring: Cristiana Capotondi
- Composer: Pino Donaggio
- Countries of origin: Austria; Italy; Germany
- No. of seasons: 1
- No. of episodes: 2

Production
- Running time: 198 min.

Original release
- Release: 16 December – 20 December 2009

Sisi (Italian: Sissi) is a 2009 Austrian-Italian-German biographical drama television miniseries directed by Xaver Schwarzenberger and starring Cristiana Capotondi in the title role. It was produced by Sunset, Publispei, RAI and EosTV, with a budget of about 11 million euros. It depicts real life events of Empress Elisabeth of Austria.

== Plot ==
=== Part 1 ===
The first part takes place from 1853, when Elisabeth got engaged to Franz Joseph, to 1857, when her first-born daughter Sophie dies.

Elisabeth, known as Sisi, grew up in Bavaria for 16 years. Reluctantly, she accompanies her mother and her older sister Helene to Bad Ischl, where Helene, known as Néné, is to be betrothed to the Emperor of Austria, the 23-year-old Franz Joseph I. However, he falls in love with Elisabeth, and although she is reluctant for Néné's sake, Sisi reciprocates his feelings. Franz ’mother, Archduchess Sophie, is reluctant to see this, but faces the new situation: Sisi should be "re-educated" to become Empress, she has to take language and dance lessons, learn to understand court etiquette and acquire knowledge about her new empire. Franz and Sisi married in April 1854 to the great cheer of the population. Contrary to all etiquette, they kiss each other in front of the entire wedding party and later spend their wedding night outdoor, in the palace gardens of Schönbrunn.

Sisi begins her new life in Vienna, oppressed by the Austria court ceremony and by her mother-in-law Sophie. She finds it difficult to get used to life at court, with the ladies-in-waiting who are always present and the strange rules. For example, when she wants to bathe, she is told that she can only do this once a week. Sophie assigns Countess Esterházy as Sisi's main lady-in-waiting, with the task of helping her with learning the court manners, but above all of supervise her and reporting to Sophie about her. One of the few friendly faces at court is Franz Joseph's brother Maximilian, Sisi's brother-in-law, with whom she gets along well, but who is leaving for Trieste. She tries to get closer to her people and is shocked at the harsh treatment that the emperor reserve to those who hold more liberal views than the government.

Elisabeth becomes pregnant and has a child, Sophie. However, to her displeasure and by order of her mother-in-law, the baby is breastfed by a wet nurse instead of herself, and is soon taken away, to be raised by a governesses. Sisi tries to change Franz's mind, but when he agrees with his mother that her tasks should be elsewhere, Sisi leaves the court. She returns to her parents, where she spends time with Néné and also meets Count Andrássy, who asks her to take the side of Hungary and to convince the emperor to give more freedom to his provinces. He also asks for an amnesty for himself and other political exiles, who were banished as enemies of the Reich after the 1848 revolution.

Franz soon reunites with Sisi and travels with her to Milan, where she has to fulfill her representative duties as his empress. During the journey she has another argument with Franz, who does not want her to raise the little Sophie. He also learned about Sisi's meeting with Count Andrássy through Countess Esterházy and is angry about his attempt to contact her. Sisi, however, tends to support Andrássy's requests (a parliament for Hungary). Nevertheless, she reconciles with Franz and soon gives birth to another daughter, Archduchess Gisela.

When Elisabeth and Franz Joseph travel to Budapest in 1857 to speak to the representatives of Hungary, including Count Andrássy, who has since been pardoned, Sophie dies of acute pneumonia. Since the two children Sophie and Gisela were brought to Hungary against the consent of Archduchess Sophie, she now accuses Elisabeth of being responsible for Sophie's death. Sophie's funeral concludes the first part.

=== Part 2 ===
The second part describes the years from 1857 to 1867, when Elisabeth was crowned Queen of Hungary.

After the death of her daughter, Sisi struggles with depression and is reluctant to return to public life. While Maximilian introduces her to his fiancée, Charlotte of Belgium, and Sisi appoints the young Hungarian countess Ida Ferenczy as her new lady-in-waiting, Franz struggles with the freedom and unification movements in the Italian provinces (Lombardy and Veneto). He adheres to the advice of Field Marshal Radetzky and insists on an authoritarian position. Maximilian tries to change his brother's mind, but Franz instead seeks an alliance with the French emperor in order to prevent the Italian provinces from rebelling against the empire. Napoleon III visits the Austrian court with his wife Eugénie and confirms the alliance.

Sisi makes no secret of her distrust of Napoleon. Nevertheless, in 1858 she and Franz celebrate the birth of the longed-for heir to the throne, Crown Prince Rudolf. Meanwhile Napoleon III betrays the Austrians, allying with the Piedmontese. Franz goes to war and suffers a devastating defeat in the Battle of Solferino, losing Lombardy. While Sisi takes care of wounded soldiers returning home in Vienna, Andrássy reappears and confronts her with the consequences of Franz Joseph's actions. He also warns them that Hungary could go the same way as the northern Italian provinces.

On the way home, Franz is confronted with the aversion of his people, who would rather have his brother Maximilian on the throne - with whom Franz has quarrelled because of his liberal attitude. Sisi discussed with him Andrássy's advice, and Franz then creates a parliament with the October diploma. However, it has no executive power, but is purely of an advisory nature, and therefore Andrássy and other Hungarians reject it immediately. Sisi also finds out that her very young son was sent to a military academy, where he is mistreated and psychologically harassed. She wants to take action against it, but Franz Joseph and Archduchess Sophie refuse to raise the child differently.

Maximilian wants to avoid further arguments with Franz - he goes to Mexico and has himself proclaimed emperor there. His mother Sophie can hardly bear to say goodbye, knowing that Max will find no support from the Mexican people. Sisi's impotence to help anyone, be it Franz, Maximilian, the Hungarians or her own son Rudolf, contributes to a serious illness: with lung sickness, emaciated and depressed, she is advised by her doctors to spend some time in a more southern climate. During such trip, she had the emperor informed that he should not contact her again until Rudolf was given a different kind of education. At a masked ball in Venice she meets an admirer who turns out to be Count Andrássy. They kiss, but she politely rejects him. After much back and forth, during which Elisabeth ignored all of Franz Joseph's letters, the emperor yields and travels to meet her with both children.

After the reconciliation (also between Elisabeth and Archduchess Sophie) and Rudolf's conversion to a more civil education, further tragedies hit the imperial couple: another military defeat, this time against Prussia, almost bankrupts the Austrian state and at the same time deprives it of Veneto. In addition, Maximilian's body is brought home from Mexico; he was shot by the rebellious Mexicans. Charlotte does not cope well with the loss and becomes increasingly entangled in delusions. Sisi is dedicated to preserving the Hungarian part of Austria and not repeating what happened in the Italian provinces. After a speech to Andrássy and the other country representatives, in which she promised more independence and the fulfillment of her demands, the Hungarians agree to crown Franz Joseph and her as their king and queen.

== Main cast ==
- Cristiana Capotondi as Empress Elisabeth
- David Rott as Franz Joseph I of Austria
- Martina Gedeck as Sophie of Bavaria
- Licia Maglietta as Ludovika of Bavaria
- Herbert Knaup as Duke Maximilian Joseph in Bavaria
- Christiane Filangieri as Duchess Helene in Bavaria
- Fritz Karl as Gyula Andrássy
- Franziska Stavjanik as Sophie Esterházy
- Katy Saunders as Ida Ferenczy
- Christoph von Friedl as Maximilian Anton
- Xaver Hutter as Ferdinand Maximilian (Maximilian I of Mexico)
- Friedrich von Thun as Joseph Radetzky von Radetz
- Federica De Cola as Charlotte of Belgium (Charlotte of Mexico)
- Erwin Steinhauer as Napoleon III
- Andrea Osvárt as Eugénie de Montijo
- Dieter Kirchlechner as Otto von Bismarck
