= The Woman of My Dreams =

The Woman of My Dreams may refer to:

- The Woman of My Dreams (1944 film), a German film directed by Georg Jacoby
- The Woman of My Dreams (2010 film), an Italian film starring Alessandro Gassman
