= King Otto =

King Otto may refer to:

- Otto of Greece (1815–1867), first modern king of Greece from 1833 to 1862.
- Otto, King of Bavaria (1848–1916), King of Bavaria from 1886 to 1913 and nephew of the above
- Otto I, Holy Roman Emperor, (912–973), also King of East Francia and Italy
- Otto II, Holy Roman Emperor, (955–983), also King of East Francia and Italy
- Otto III, Holy Roman Emperor, (980–1002), also King of East Francia and Italy
- Otto IV, Holy Roman Emperor, (1175 or 1176–1218), one of two rival kings of the Holy Roman Empire
- King Otto (film), a 2021 documentary film about football manager Otto Rehhagel

== See also ==
- King Ottokar (disambiguation)
