= Circeo massacre =

1975 crime in San Felice Circeo, Italy

The Circeo massacre (Italian: massacro del Circeo) was a rape and murder case that occurred in the Italian town of San Felice Circeo, in the Province of Latina in the Lazio region, on 29 and 30 September 1975. The case involved three men who kidnapped and raped two young women, one of whom died.

== Timeline of events ==
Donatella Colasanti (12 May 1958 – 30 December 2005) and Rosaria Lopez (1956–1975) were both raised by working-class families in the Montagnola neighbourhood of Rome. When the crime occurred, Lopez, 19, was working as a bartender, and Colasanti, 17, was a student.

Colasanti and Lopez met Angelo Izzo, 20, and Giovanni Guido, 19, through a mutual friend, Gian Pietro Parboni. The men were using aliases to obfuscate their connection to prior sexual assaults and cover their tracks. Parboni invited them a few days earlier to a bar at the "Il Fungo" tower in Rome's EUR district. Colasanti and Lopez liked the two men, who seemed polite and approachable. Izzo and Guido invited Colasanti, Lopez, and a third friend, who at the last moment decided not to join the group, to a party at Ghira's house in Lavinio, Anzio, about 50 km south of Rome. They met in front of the Ambassade Cinema on 29 September at 3:30 PM.

=== Abduction ===
On 29 September at 6:20 PM, Izzo, Guido, Colasanti, and Lopez arrived at Villa Moresca, located on Via della Vasca Moresca in the Punta Rossa area of Cape Circeo, in the San Felice Circeo municipality, about 100 km south of Rome. The villa belonged to the family of the men's friend, Andrea Ghira, 22. They told Colasanti and Lopez that they would meet another friend there and then go to a party at Parboni's house together. However, after a few hours of chatting and listening to music, Izzo and Guido suddenly made explicit sexual advances toward Colasanti and Lopez. When they refused to reciprocate, one of the men pulled out a gun and told Colasanti and Lopez that he belonged to a criminal gang from Marseille and that the gang's leader, Jacques, had given orders to kidnap them since he wanted two girls.

=== Attack ===
Throughout the next 35 hours, Izzo and Guido proceeded to rape and torture Colasanti and Lopez. They were joined by Ghira, who claimed to be a capo of the Marseille gang. Later, Colasanti and Lopez were drugged, then Lopez was dragged to the upstairs bathroom, where she was beaten and finally drowned in the bathtub. They then attempted to strangle Colasanti with a belt and abuse her. While her attackers were momentarily distracted, she reached a telephone and tried to call for help, but was discovered and hit with an iron bar. She then let herself fall to the ground and pretended to be dead. Believing that they had killed her too, the trio locked her and the corpse of Lopez in the trunk of a white FIAT 127. They then left for Rome, intending to dispose of the bodies. Colasanti later recounted that while driving, the trio was laughing merrily and listening to music while making fun of Colasanti and Lopez: "Shut up, we have two bodies on board." and "How well do they sleep?"

Having arrived near Guido's house, the trio decided to go to a restaurant for dinner, where they were involved in a fight with two young communist militants whom they had crossed paths with by chance, so they left the car parked on Viale Pola in the Trieste quarter.

=== Escape ===
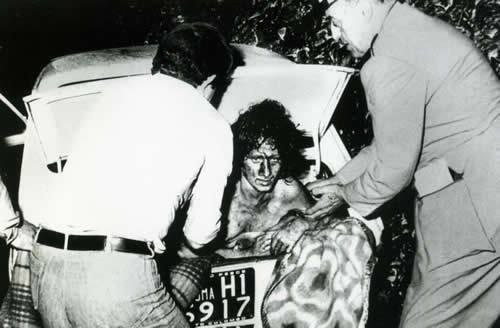
Colasanti is rescued from the trunk of the 127. Photograph by Antonio Monteforte.

As soon as the trio had left, Colasanti, though in shock, began shouting and throwing blows at the trunk walls to draw attention. At 10:50 PM, a night watchman heard the noises. He alerted police in a nearby Carabinieri squad car, who raised the alarm with the following coded message: "Swan, swan, there's a cat meowing inside a 127 on Viale Pola." This was intercepted by photojournalist Antonio Monteforte, who rushed to the scene and was able to photograph the opening of the trunk and the discovery of Colasanti alongside Lopez's corpse. Colasanti was rushed to the hospital, where she was diagnosed with several severe injuries and a fractured nose. In addition, the ordeal caused her very serious psychological damage, from which she never fully recovered.

=== Arrest and conviction ===
Izzo and Guido were arrested within a few hours, while Ghira, alerted by a tip, went into hiding. The following day, the Carabinieri discovered the latter's mother and brother near the Circeo home and speculated that Ghira had warned them and asked for help in making any traces disappear.

A few months later, Ghira wrote a letter, intercepted by investigators, to his friends Izzo and Guido, in which he assured them that they would be out soon "for good behaviour" and threatened to kill Colasanti if she testified against them.

The investigation was entrusted to the Carabinieri, led by Marshal Gesualdo Simonetti, who, partly thanks to Colasanti's testimony, reconstructed the events of the massacre.

Colasanti, who later formed a civil party against her assailants, was represented by a lawyer, Tina Lagostena Bassi. Several feminist associations constituted themselves as civil parties and attended the trial.

On 29 July 1976, a first-degree verdict of murder was handed down, sentencing Izzo and Guido, and Ghira in absentia, to life imprisonment without parole.

== Perpetrators ==
The perpetrators came from affluent Roman families and displayed far-right tendencies:

- Andrea Ghira was born on 21 September 1953, to construction contractor and water polo player Aldo Ghira, who was part of the gold medal-winning Italian team at the 1948 Summer Olympics, and his wife Maria Cecilia Angelini Rota. While studying at Liceo classico Giulio Cesare ("Giulio Cesare High School"), he became involved in far-right circles. At the school, he had formed a group that theorised crime as a means of social affirmation. His first trouble with the law came at age 16, in 1970, due to his participation in far-right demonstrations and episodes of political hooliganism. Infatuated with the myth of the Marseilles gang, he often used the pseudonym "Jacques" in honour of Jacques Berenguer, a member of that gang who had pulled off a series of kidnappings for extortion in Rome. Ghira had received an initial charge for seditious demonstration, then, in 1972, was charged with armed menace and aggravated injury. In 1973, he and Izzo carried out an armed robbery and were sentenced to five years in prison in Rebibbia, but served only 20 months.
- Angelo Izzo was born on 23 August 1955, the son of a builder, and lived in the middle-class Roman neighbourhood of Trieste-Salario. At the age of 13, he joined Giovane Italia ("Young Italy"), the youth wing of the neo-fascist Italian Social Movement (MSI). At the end of 1969, he and Ghira were expelled from the group for using the inner courtyard of the movement's Trieste-Salario section to hide stolen mopeds. From 1972 to 1975, Izzo took part in attacks alongside other Roman right-wing youth, notably against the Trieste quarter section of the Italian Socialist Party (PSI). He also participated in: numerous self-financing robberies, robbing banks, jewellery stores, and post offices; drug trafficking, cultivated in agreement with the common underworld; and many gang rapes, employing the same technique (i.e., luring an already known girl into a house) that was used for the Circeo episode. By 1975, Izzo had enrolled as a medical student. He attended classes only occasionally and, instead of studying, preferred to frequent bars and attend parties organised in the homes of other young right-wing extremists, in which political ideology, drugs, and violence against women were mixed. He also had a criminal record even before the Circeo massacre: he had raped two women in 1974 and received a two-and-a-half-year suspended sentence.
- Giovanni "Gianni" Guido was born on 10 January 1956, the son of Raffaele Guido, an official of the Banca Nazionale del Lavoro, and his wife Maria Pia Ciampa. At the time of the crime, he was an architecture student living with his parents on Via Capodistria in the Trieste quarter (near Viale Pola, where the trio abandoned their car).

== Aftermath ==
=== Ghira's escape to Spain and death ===
It was later discovered that Ghira had managed to flee to Spain, where on 26 June 1976, he enlisted in the Spanish Legion in Madrid under the fake name of Massimo Testa de Andrés (Andrés being the Spanish version of his first name Andrea), claiming to have been born in Rome in 1955. He then served at Tercio Duque de Alba in Fuerteventura, Ceuta, and Melilla. However, during his service he developed a drug problem, and, on 28 May 1980, began a six-month sentence in prison in Cádiz for a "crime against public health." In 1982, Ghira was assigned to Special Operations in Málaga before being sent to Melilla, where he suffered "numerous penalties for possession and consumption of drugs." On 21 July 1993, he was admitted to a military hospital, possibly for a head tumour, and was forcibly retired due to his poor psychophysical condition. Without a passport, he was now stuck in Melilla, where he lived with a girlfriend who ran a soda stand and continued to do drugs. It was in Melilla that he died on 2 September 1994 of a drug overdose. His body was found a week later, on 9 September. He was buried in the local cemetery.

In 2005, the Rome Prosecutor's Office requested the body's exhumation, which took place on 14 November 2005, in the presence of Italian investigators. A femur was then taken to Rome for investigation. On 26 November 2005, the DNA testing confirmed Ghira's identity. However, the analysis raised doubts. Reportedly, the test, conducted in the laboratories of the Institute of Forensic Medicine at La Sapienza University, was carried out by geneticist Dr. Carla Vecchiotti, who turned out to be a former student and pupil of Prof. Matilde Angelini Rota, the forensic scientist in charge of the rape clinic at the Institute and Ghira's maternal aunt. Because of this, Colasanti declared that Ghira was still alive and staying in Rome, and that the remains were those of one of his relatives. Rosaria Lopez' sister, Letizia, also expressed doubts. To dispel them, in January 2016, the Rome Public Prosecutor's Office reopened the case and ordered that the body be exhumed again to undergo a new, more thorough DNA test. The report, filed in June 2016 by Professors Giovanni Arcudi and Giuseppe Novelli, attested that the results of this test, carried out on bone marrow samples, confirm that the remains of the Spanish Foreign Legion NCO belong to Andrea Ghira.

=== Izzo's attempts at escape ===
In January 1977, Izzo and Guido attempted to escape from Latina Prison by taking the prison guards' marshal hostage, albeit unsuccessfully. In January 1986, Izzo again failed to escape from prison in Paliano. On 25 August 1993, taking advantage of the premio permit, he failed to return to jail in Alessandria and fled to France. On 15 September, he was captured in Paris and extradited to Italy.

=== Additional murders ===
In December 2004, Angelo Izzo was granted semi-freedom from Campobasso Prison in order to work at the Città Futura co-operative. Nearly five months later, on 28 April 2005, he murdered 49-year-old Maria Carmela and her 14-year-old daughter Valentina Maiorano in Ferrazzano. They were the wife and daughter of his former cellmate Giovanni Maiorano, a Sacra corona unita turncoat who had been sentenced to life in prison for the 1990 decapitation of 17-year-old Cristiano Mazzeo for drug debts. The two women were bound, suffocated, and buried in the courtyard of a small villa in Mirabello Sannitico, owned by the Città futura association secretary Guido Palladino. The double murder was revealed on 30 April by Palladino and his associate, Luca Palaia, who were both initially arrested for illicit arms trafficking. Palladino's plea bargain led to three years and two months' imprisonment for conspiracy to conceal a corpse, while Palaia was sentenced to 24 years for conspiracy to murder, concealment, and attempted destruction of corpses, which was increased to 30 years on appeal and upheld in the Supreme Court. For these murders, Izzo was again sentenced to life imprisonment on 12 January 2007.

In November 2009, journalist Donatella Papi announced she wanted to marry Izzo and fight to reopen the two trials that led to his incarceration. They were married on 10 March 2010, in Velletri prison. Their relationship ended about a year later.

In October 2021, Izzo made a statement before the Antimafia Commission regarding Rossella Corazzin, a Friulian woman who had disappeared aged 17 on 21 August 1975 while on vacation with her family in Pieve di Cadore in the province of Belluno. Izzo traced her disappearance to the Masonic Lodge and claimed that she was targeted because of her virginity and used as a sacrificial victim in an initiation ceremony by the Confraternity of the Red Rose and the Golden Cross at Dr Francesco Narducci's villa on Lake Trasimeno. Once the macabre Masonic ritual was over, the girl was let out of the room where the ceremony took place, "and that's the last time I saw her." Izzo says he is confident that the woman was murdered and that the body would be found buried in the woods.

During his incarceration, Izzo wrote several manuscripts, including "Decameron 1975", in which a group of neo-fascist youth flees Rome during a communist terror attack for a villa in San Felice Circeo, where they take turns telling each other stories due to a temporary lack of high-quality narcotics.

=== Guido's escapes from incarceration ===
Guido's prison sentence was modified on appeal on 28 October 1980, being changed from life imprisonment to 30 years, following a declaration of repentance and compensation of 100 million lire to the Lopez family. In January 1981, he escaped from prison in San Gimignano and fled to Buenos Aires, where he was recognised and arrested a little more than two years later. While awaiting extradition, on 17 April 1985, he escaped from the Manuel Rocco hospital in Buenos Aires, where he had been hospitalised for hepatitis (probably contracted years earlier in jail due to the use of drugs taken intravenously). He later resurfaced in Panama in June 1994, where he had made a new life as a car dealer and was extradited back to Italy.

=== Guido's release from captivity ===
On 11 April 2008, Gianni Guido's sentence was commuted to community service following 14 years in Rebibbia Prison, where he graduated with a Foreign Languages and Literature degree. He finished serving his sentence on 25 August 2009, enjoying an eight-year discount thanks to a pardon. Letizia Lopez, Rosaria's sister, reacted negatively to this development, particularly about Guido's long absconding abroad, the absence of any signs of repentance on his part, and judging his detention regime to be insufficiently rigorous.

== Donatella Colasanti ==
Donatella Colasanti died on 30 December 2005, aged 47, of breast cancer. Her last words were: "Battiamoci per la verità" ("Let us fight for the truth"). In 2020, her old home was reopened as an anti-violence centre.

== In media ==
- Terror in Rome (I violenti di Roma bene), 1976 (loosely based), written by Sergio Grieco and Massimo Felisatti
- I ragazzi della Roma violenta, 1976 (loosely based), by Renato Savino
- The Catholic School, 2021, by Stefano Mordini
- Circeo, 2022, TV miniseries by Andrea Molaioli
