= Picomedia =

Italian film production company

Picomedia S.r.l.
- Type: Società a responsabilità limitata (S.r.l.)
- Industry: Entertainment
- Founded: 2009; 17 years ago
- Founder: Roberto Sessa
- Headquarters: Rome, Italy
- Products: Feature films; Television series
- Parent: Fremantle
- Website: picomedia.it

Picomedia S.r.l. is an Italian film and television production company. It was founded by Roberto Sessa in 2009.

== History ==
Picomedia was founded by Roberto Sessa in 2009. In 2020, Asacha Media acquired a majority stake in the company. In 2024, Asacha Media was acquired by Fremantle.

== Filmography ==
=== Films ===
Year	Title	Director	Ref.
2012	Twice Born	Sergio Castellitto	
2015	Them Who?	Francesco Miccichè, Fabio Bonifacci	
2017	Moglie e marito	Simone Godano	
2017	The Music of Silence	Michael Radford	
2018	The Invisible Witness	Stefano Mordini	
2019	L'agenzia dei bugiardi	Volfango De Biasi	
2019	An Almost Ordinary Summer	Simone Godano	
2020	È per il tuo bene	Rolando Ravello	
2020	Nowhere Special	Uberto Pasolini	
2020	You Came Back	Stefano Mordini	
2021	The Catholic School	Stefano Mordini	
2021	Trafficante di virus	Costanza Quatriglio	
2022	Nostalgia	Mario Martone	
2022	Il mammone	Giovanni Bognetti	
2024	Caracas	Marco D'Amore	
2024	Vanished into the Night	Renato De Maria	
2024	The Return	Uberto Pasolini	
2024	Una terapia di gruppo	Paolo Costella	
2024	Criature	Cécile Allegra	
2025	Io sono Rosa Ricci	Lyda Patitucci	
TBA	La lezione	Stefano Mordini	

=== Television ===
Year	Title	Network	Notes	Ref.
2014	L'oro di Scampia	Rai 1	Television film	
2015	L'angelo di Sarajevo	Rai 1	Miniseries	
2015–2016	Tutti insieme all'improvviso	Canale 5		
2016	Io non mi arrendo	Rai 1	Miniseries	
2017	I fantasmi di Portopalo	Rai 1	Miniseries	
2018–2020	La vita promessa	Rai 1		
2019	Il mondo sulle spalle	Rai 1	Television film	
2019	Doctor Giorgia	Canale 5	Season 3	
2020	The Sea Beyond	Rai 2		
2020	Gli orologi del diavolo	Rai 1		
2020	Natale in casa Cupiello	Rai 1	Television film	
2021	La bambina che non voleva cantare	Rai 1	Television film	
2021	Sabato, domenica e lunedì	Rai 1	Television film	
2021	Non ti pago	Rai 1	Television film	
2022–2024	Everything Calls for Salvation	Netflix		
2022	Filumena Marturano	Rai 1	Television film	
2023	Vivere non è un gioco da ragazzi	Rai 1	Miniseries	
2023	Napoli milionaria!	Rai 1	Television film	
2024	La Storia	Rai 1	Miniseries	
2024	Adoration	Netflix		
2024	Questi fantasmi!	Rai 1	Television film	
TBA	Gulliver's Travels			
TBA	Kurgan			
TBA	La scuola			
