= Sophie of Austria =

Sophie of Austria may refer to:

- Sophie, Princess of Bavaria, after her marriage became Archduchess Sophie of Austria (1805 – 1872)
- Archduchess Sophie of Austria (1855 – 1857)
