= Christopher André Marks =

American-Greek film director, producer, and screenwriter

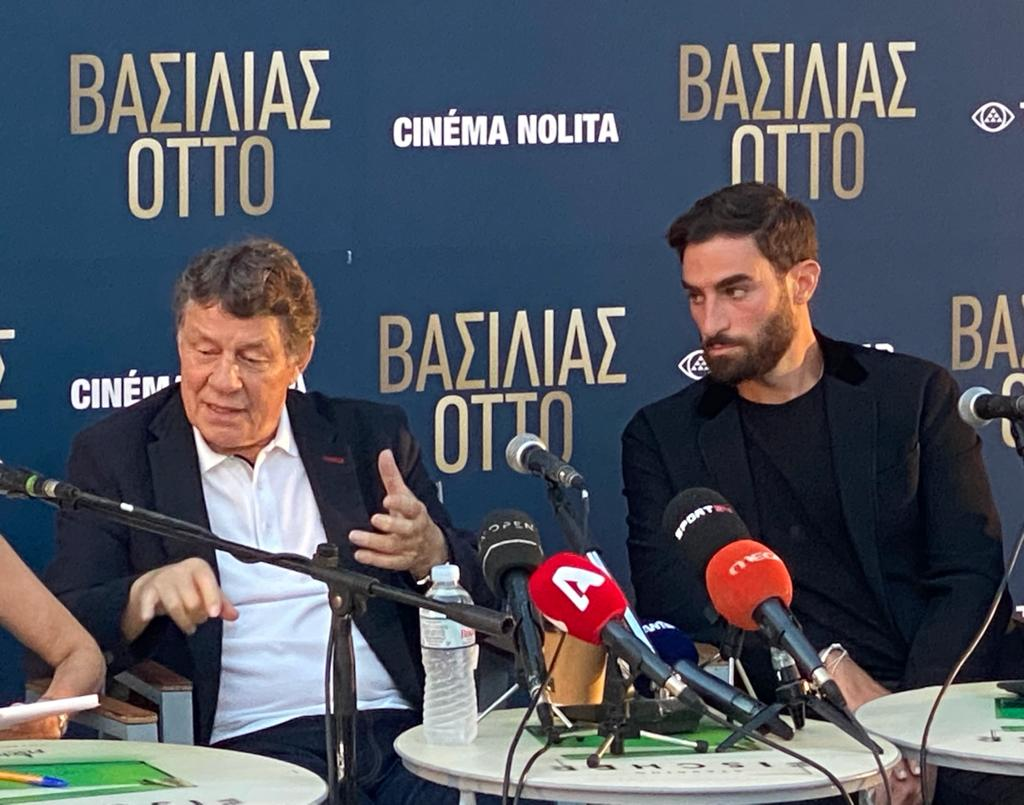
- Education: New York University
- Occupations: Film director, screenwriter, producer
- Known for: King Otto (film), 30 for 30

Christopher André Marks (Greek: Κρίστοφερ Αντρέ Μαρκς) is an American-Greek film director, film producer, and screenwriter, best known for the 2021 film King Otto.

== Early life ==
Marks grew up in California. His family was in the Latin music industry, however he was raised Greek, often returning to Athens throughout his childhood. He began his career at The Weinstein Company and moved on to work with ESPN and HBO. He attended New York University's Tisch of the Arts film program. He speaks 4 languages, English, Greek, Italian and Spanish.

== Career ==
The Hollywood Reporter announced Marks' next feature, a heist comedy entitled 'Mykonos', has wrapped principal photography. The film was written and directed by Marks and will star Greek actor Klelia Andriolatou, alongside Julia Fox, Vito Schnabel and Riccardo Scamarcio, with NBA MVP Giannis Antetokounmpo and his production company Improbable Media co-producing.

In 2024, Variety reported that Marks launched a new production company, Studio Galazio, with the aim to bring high value Greek stories to mainstream international audiences. In its initial slate, Marks and Galazio have partnered with 2 time NBA MVP Giannis Antetokounmpo and his new production venture, Improbable Media, to produce an international heist comedy set in Greece.

In 2022, Marks directed King Otto, on the Greece national team's victory at Euro 2004, opened to wide international critical acclaim from outlets such as the Los Angeles Times, The Guardian, The Australian, Süddeutsche Zeitung, The Times and The Daily Telegraph. It is marked as "fresh" on critic aggregate website Rotten Tomatoes. David Stratton of the Australian said "Full marks must be awarded to director Christopher Andre Marks for telling this real-life feel-good story so well and so entertainingly - even the most unlikely subject, in the right hands, can make for compelling drama." It premiered at Museum of Modern Art and was distributed in cinemas and on streaming platforms in over 75 countries via partners such as the BBC, Peacock (streaming service), Warner Bros. Discovery, Sky UK, Sky Deutschland and Canal+. As the film is about a German working with the Greece national team, Marks states that the film's central focal point is on what "unites us versus what divides us" as people. Marks stated to Kathimerini that his next two projects will be shot in Greece and are currently in development.

He previously directed and produced the film Tiger Hood for ESPN Films' Emmy Award Winning '30 for 30' series. The film had its world premiere at the South by Southwest film festival and was released in the United States and Canada on ESPN, ESPN2 and SportsCenter.
