= Fiammetta Cicogna =

Italian television presenter and model

- Born: 17 May 1988 (age 36); Milan, Italy
- Occupation(s): Television presenter, actress, model

Fiammetta Cicogna (born 17 May 1988) is an Italian television presenter, actress, and model.

In 2022, she launched a jewelry brand called Inbilico.

== Life ==
Daughter of a Milanese candle maker, she began studying piano at the age of three. She achieved popularity thanks to Gabriele Muccino, who selected her for a Telecom Italia commercial, in which she played the role of a keyboardist for the young pop group TBand, a group that later obtained a contract with Caterina Caselli's record label Sugar: in 2009 the band released, in the wake of the success achieved with the commercial, a single with the cover Con te partirò, which was followed by the song Sogni.

Her television debut was on 25 July 2009 at the participation in the Venice Music Awards on Rai 2 in the role of the correspondent for backstage connections, and then with the co-hosting, with Savino Zaba, of the spin-off Venice Music Awards Giovani. In the 2009-2010 season, she participated as a pianist in the Chiambretti Night, a program broadcast on Italia 1 from September 2009 to April 2010 in the late evening. In November 2009, when she posed for the cover photo shoot for the magazine Maxim, she was a student of modern letters at the Università Cattolica del Sacro Cuore, leaving study of the law.

== Filmography ==
- The Dove and the Serpent – short film (2011)
- Blame Freud (2014)
- Sapore di te (2014)
- On Air - Storia di un successo (2016)
- In vacanza su Marte (2020)

== Television ==
- Venice Music Awards Giovani (2009)
- Chiambretti Night (2009-2010)
- Wild - Oltrenatura (2009-2015)
- Tamarreide (2011)
- Takeshi's Castle (2011-2014)
- Colorado - 'Sto classico (2012)
- Celebrity Games (2012)
- Forever Together Summer Show (2013)
- Colorado ... a rotazione! (2013)
- Tamarreide, director's cut (2013)
- Made In Italy (2019)
