= Riccardo Scamarcio =

Italian actor and producer (born 1979)

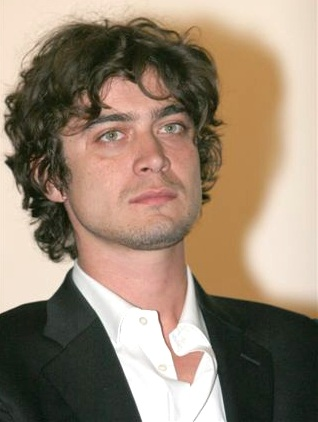
- Scamarcio in 2008
- Born: 13 November 1979 (age 46); Trani, Apulia, Italy
- Education: Centro Sperimentale di Cinematografia
- Occupation: Actor • film producer
- Years active: 2000–present
- Partner(s): Angela Liso (1996–2006); Valeria Golino (2006–2016); Benedetta Porcaroli (2021–present)
- Children: 1

Riccardo Dario Scamarcio (Italian pronunciation: [rikˈkardo skaˈmartʃo]; born 13 November 1979) is an Italian actor and film producer.

== Early life ==
Scamarcio was born in Trani, Apulia, the son of Emilio Scamarcio, a food sales representative, and Irene Petrafesa, a painter. He went to train as an actor at the Scuola Nazionale di Cinema in Rome, where he now lives.

== Career ==
His debut acting role was in a TV series in 2000, while his first ever lead role in a feature film was in Three Steps Over Heaven (2004), directed by Luca Lucini. Through this he immediately became well known to the Italian speaking public, especially a young audience. His success brought him prominence as a sex symbol and boosted requests for his acting skills, leading to his role in Texas (2005), directed by Fausto Paravidino and to him joining the cast of Romanzo Criminale, playing a monosyllabic, enigmatic thug character in a powerful portrait of a mafiosi community directed by Michele Placido.

In 2006 he acted in The Black Arrow, a TV series broadcast by Canale 5, adapted from the novel by Robert Louis Stevenson, and took on four new film roles, including in My Brother Is an Only Child (2007), directed by Daniele Luchetti, based on the novel Il fasciocomunista by Antonio Pennacchi. Scamarcio won a David di Donatello nomination for Best Supporting Actor for this work. He also played in Manual of Love 2 (2007), directed by Giovanni Veronesi, Ho voglia di te (2007), directed by Luis Prieto, and Go Go Tales (2007), directed by Abel Ferrara.

In 2007 he began work on At a Glance (2008) directed by Sergio Rubini, Italians (2009), a comedy directed by Giovanni Veronesi, and The Big Dream (2009), set in Italy in 1968, directed by Michele Placido. Eden à l'Ouest, directed by Costa-Gavras, saw Scamarcio playing an illegal immigrant-cum-innocent abroad. The Cézanne Affair (2009), directed by Sergio Rubini, co-starred Scamarcio's then partner, Italian-Greek actress, Valeria Golino, who played his sister.

The lead in Golino's 2018 movie Euforia is considered to be one of Scamarcio's best performances.

He starred in John Wick: Chapter 2, playing the Italian Mob boss, Santino D'Antonio, the antagonist in the film.

In 2024 he starred as the lead character in the Netflix film Vanished into the Night, directed by Renato De Maria and co-starring Annabelle Wallis. This film was in Netflix's top 10 in July of that year.

In September 2026, Scamarcio won the Orizzonti Award for Best Actor at the 83rd Venice International Film Festival for his performance in Tommaso Landucci's Children of the Monkey.

== Personal life ==
From 2006 to 2016 Scamarcio dated actress and director Valeria Golino. They continue working together even after the break-up and maintain a good bond. Scamarcio has a daughter (b. 2020) with Angharad Wood. Since 2021, he has been in a relationship with Italian actress Benedetta Porcaroli.

== Filmography ==
=== Film ===
Title	Year	Role(s)	Director	Notes
The Best of Youth	2003	Andrea Utano	Marco Tullio Giordana	
Prova a volare	2003	Alessandro	Lorenzo Cicconi	
Now or Never	2003	Biri	Lucio Pellegrini	
Three Steps Over Heaven	2004	Stefano Mancini	Luca Lucini	
L'uomo perfetto	2005	Antonio	Luca Lucini	
Texas	2005	Gianluca	Fausto Paravidino	
Romanzo Criminale	2005	Il Nero	Michele Placido	
Manual of Love 2	2007	Nicola	Giovanni Veronesi	
Ho voglia di te	2007	Stefano Mancini	Luis Prieto	
My Brother Is an Only Child	2007	Manrico Benassi	Daniele Luchetti	
Go Go Tales	2007	Dr. Steven	Abel Ferrara	
At a Glance	2008	Adrian Scala	Sergio Rubini	
Italians	2009	Marcello Polidori / Walter LoRusso	Giovanni Veronesi	Segment: "Primo episodio"
Eden Is West	2009	Elias	Costa-Gavras	
The Big Dream	2009	Nicola	Michele Placido	
The Front Line	2009	Sergio Segio	Renato De Maria	
The Cézanne Affair	2009	Pinuccio	Sergio Rubini	
Loose Cannons	2010	Tommaso Cantone	Ferzan Özpetek	
Polisse	2011	Francesco	Maïwenn	
The Ages of Love	2011	Roberto	Giovanni Veronesi	
To Rome with Love	2012	Hotel thief	Woody Allen	Cameo appearance
The Red and the Blue	2012	Professor Giovanni Prezioso	Giuseppe Piccioni	
Cosimo and Nicole	2012	Cosimo	Francesco Amato	
A Small Southern Enterprise	2013	Arturo	Rocco Papaleo	
The Informant	2013	Mario / Claudio Pasco Lanfredi	Julien Leclercq	
Third Person	2013	Marco	Paul Haggis	
A Golden Boy	2014	Davide Bias	Pupi Avati	
Effie Gray	2014	Raffaele	Richard Laxton	
Pasolini	2014	Ninetto Davoli	Abel Ferrara	
Wondrous Boccaccio	2015	Gentile Carisendi	Paolo and Vittorio Taviani	
You Can't Save Yourself Alone	2015	Gaetano	Margaret Mazzantini	
First Light	2015	Marco Mauri	Vincenzo Marra	
Io che amo solo te	2015	Damiano Scagliusi	Marco Ponti	
Burnt	2015	Max	John Wells	
Pericle	2016	Pericle	Stefano Mordini	Also producer
La verità sta in cielo	2016	Enrico De Pedis	Roberto Faenza	
Ali and Nino	2016	Melik Nakahararyan	Asif Kapadia	
La cena di Natale	2016	Damiano Scagliusi	Marco Ponti	
Dalida	2017	Orlando	Lisa Azuelos	
John Wick: Chapter 2	2017	Santino D'Antonio	Chad Stahelski	
Loro	2018	Sergio Morra	Paolo Sorrentino	
Early Man	2018	Dug (voice)	Nick Park	Italian dub; voice role
Welcome Home	2018	Federico	George Ratliff	
Euphoria	2018	Matteo	Valeria Golino	
The Summer House	2018	Luca	Valeria Bruni Tedeschi	
The Invisible Witness	2018	Adriano Doria	Stefano Mordini	
Cosa fai a Capodanno?	2018	Valerio	Filippo Bologna	
I'm Not a Killer	2019	Francesco Prencipe	Andrea Zaccariello	
If Only	2019	Carlo	Ginevra Elkann	
Il ladro di giorni	2019	Vincenzo De Benedettis	Guido Lombardi	
The Translators	2019	Dario Farelli	Régis Roinsard	
The Ruthless	2019	Santo Russo	Renato De Maria	
The Players	2020	Lorenzo	Stefano Mordini	Also producer and writer
The Binding	2020	Francesco	Domenico De Feudis	Also producer
The Last Paradise	2021	Ciccio Paradiso / Antonio Paradiso	Rocco Ricciardulli	Also producer and writer
Three Floors	2021	Lucio Polara	Nanni Moretti	
The Catholic School	2021	Raffaele Guido	Stefano Mordini	
The Shadow of the Day	2022	Luciano Traini	Giuseppe Piccioni	Also producer
Tu choisiras la vie	2022	Elio De Angelis	Stéphane Freiss	
Quasi orfano	2022	Valentino	Umberto Carteni	
Caravaggio's Shadow	2022	Caravaggio	Michele Placido	
A Haunting in Venice	2023	Vitale Portfoglio	Kenneth Branagh	
I Told You So	2023	Riccardo	Ginevra Elkann	
Race for Glory: Audi vs. Lancia	2024	Cesare Fiorio	Stefano Mordini	Also producer and writer
Sei fratelli	2024	Marco	Simone Godano	
Modì, Three Days on the Wing of Madness	2024	Amedeo Modigliani	Johnny Depp	
Vanished into the Night	2024	Pietro Torre	Renato De Maria	
Close to Me	2025	Luca	Stefano Sardo	
Zvanì - Il romanzo famigliare di Giovanni Pascoli	2025	Cacciaguerra	Giuseppe Piccioni	
At the Revolutionary Festival	2026	Pietro Brandi	Arnaldo Catinari	
Children of the Monkey	2026	Dario	Tommaso Landucci	Also producer
The Resurrection of the Christ: Part One †	2027	Pontius Pilate	Mel Gibson	Post-production
The Resurrection of the Christ: Part Two †	2028	Pontius Pilate	Mel Gibson	Post-production
White Tide †	TBA	TBA	Paul Raschid	Completed
Mykonos †	TBA	TBA	Christopher André Marks	Post-production
Giorni felici †	TBA	TBA	Susanna Nicchiarelli	Post-production

=== Television ===
Title	Year	Role(s)	Network	Notes
Compagni di scuola	2001	Michele Reale	Rai 2	26 episodes
La freccia nera	2006	Marco di Monforte	Canale 5	6 episodes
Il segreto dell'acqua	2011	Angelo Caronia	Rai 1	6 episodes
London Spy	2015	Dopplergänger	BBC Two	Episode: "I Know"
Master of None	2017	Pino	Netflix	3 episodes
Liberi sognatori	2018	Antonio Montinaro	Canale 5	Episode: "La scorta di Borsellino: Emanuela Loi"
The Woman in White	2018	Count Fosco	BBC One	5 episodes
Maradona: Blessed Dream	2021	Carmine Giuliano	Prime Video	Episode: "Vesuvio"
The Beauty	2026	Italian Police Officer	FX	Episode: "Beautiful Christopher Cross"

=== Other credits ===
Title	Year	Role(s)
Diarchia	2010	Short film; producer
L'uomo doppio	2012	Producer
Miele	2013	Producer
La vita oscena	2014	Co-producer
The Dream	2014	Short film; producer
Per amor vostro	2015	Producer
Pericle	2016	Producer
Dei	2018	Producer
The Players	2020	Writer and producer
The Binding	2020	Producer
The Last Paradise	2021	Writer and producer
The Shadow of the Day	2022	Producer
Race for Glory: Audi vs. Lancia	2024	Writer and producer

=== Stage ===
Title	Year	Role(s)	Venue	Director
Romeo and Juliet	2011	Romeo	Teatro Smeraldo; Milan	Valerio Binasco
