= The Catholic School =

2021 drama film by Stefano Mordini

- Theatrical release poster
- La scuola cattolica
- Directed by: Stefano Mordini
- Screenplay by: Massimo Gaudioso; Luca Infascelli; Stefano Mordini
- Based on: The Catholic School by Edoardo Albinati
- Produced by: Roberto Sessa
- Starring: Valeria Golino; Riccardo Scamarcio; Jasmine Trinca; Benedetta Porcaroli; Giulio Pranno; Federica Torchetti; Fabrizio Gifuni; Fausto Russo Alesi; Valentina Cervi
- Cinematography: Luigi Martinucci
- Edited by: Massimo Fiocchi
- Music by: Andrea Guerra
- Production company: Picomedia
- Distributed by: Warner Bros. Pictures
- Release dates: 6 September 2021 (Venice); 7 October 2021 (Italy)
- Running time: 106 minutes
- Country: Italy
- Language: Italian

The Catholic School (Italian: La scuola cattolica) is a 2021 Italian drama film directed by Stefano Mordini. The film is an adaptation of the novel of the same name by Edoardo Albinati and is based on the 1975 Circeo massacre. It premiered out of competition at the 78th Venice Film Festival, and was released in Italy on 7 October 2021.

== Cast ==
- Benedetta Porcaroli as Donatella Colasanti
- Giulio Pranno as Andrea Ghira
- Emanuele Maria Di Stefano as Edoardo Albinati
- Giulio Fochetti as Alessandro Arbus
- Leonardo Ragazzini as Salvatore Izzo
- Alessandro Cantalini as Picchiatello Martirolo
- Andrea Lintozzi as Gioachino Rummo
- Guido Quaglione as Stefano Jervi
- Federica Torchetti as Rosaria
- Luca Vergoni as Angelo Izzo
- Francesco Cavallo as Gianni Guido
- Angelica Elli as Leda Arbus
- Corrado Invernizzi as the Principal
- Gianluca Guidi as Ludovico Arbus
- Fabrizio Gifuni as Golgota
- Fausto Russo Alesi as Davide Rummo
- Valentina Cervi as Eleonora Rummo
- Valeria Golino as Ilaria Arbus
- Riccardo Scamarcio as Raffaele Guido
- Jasmine Trinca as Coralla Martirolo
- Nicolò Galasso as Marco D'Avenia
- Elena Arvigo as Anna Izzo
- Beatrice Spata as Lia Rummo
- Sofia Iacuitto as Monica
- Maria Rosaria Mingione as Nadia
- Margherita Rebeggiani as Sara
- Sergio Romano as Professor Cosmo
- Marco Sincini as Curzio
- Giulio Tropea as Gian Pietro Parboni Arquati
- Alessio Montesi as Marco Romoli

== Reception ==
The Catholic School has an approval rating of 14% on review aggregator website Rotten Tomatoes, based on 7 reviews.
