= The Binding (2020 film) =

2020 Italian film

- Film poster
- Italian: Il legame
- Directed by: Domenico Emanuele de Feudis
- Written by: Daniele Cosci; Davide Orsini; Domenico Emanuele de Feudis
- Starring: Mía Maestro; Riccardo Scamarcio
- Distributed by: Netflix
- Release date: October 2, 2020
- Running time: 93 minutes
- Country: Italy
- Language: Italian

The Binding (Italian: Il legame) is a 2020 Italian supernatural folk horror film directed by Domenico Emanuele de Feudis, written by Daniele Cosci, Davide Orsini and Domenico Emanuele de Feudis and starring Mía Maestro, Riccardo Scamarcio, Michael C. Pizzuto and Federica Rosellini. While visiting her fiancé's mother in southern Italy, a woman must fight off a mysterious and malevolent curse intent on claiming her young daughter.

== Production ==
The shooting of the film took place in 2019 entirely in Apulia, in southern Italy, between the village of Selva di Fasano and Monopoli, part of the Metropolitan City of Bari.

== Distribution ==
The film was released on October 2 distributed by the Netflix platform.

== Cast ==
- Riccardo Scamarcio
- Mía Maestro
- Michael C. Pizzuto
- Federica Rosellini
- Sebastiano Filocamo as Don Gino
