= A Journey Called Love =

- Directed by: Michele Placido
- Starring: Laura Morante; Stefano Accorsi
- Cinematography: Luca Bigazzi
- Edited by: Esmeralda Calabria
- Music by: Carlo Crivelli
- Release date: 2002
- Language: Italian

Un viaggio chiamato amore (internationally released as A Journey Called Love) is a 2002 Italian romantic drama film directed by Michele Placido.

It tells the tormented relationship between the writer Sibilla Aleramo and the poet Dino Campana.

The film entered the 59th Venice International Film Festival, where Stefano Accorsi was awarded with the Volpi Cup for best actor.

== Cast ==
- Laura Morante: Sibilla Aleramo
  - Katy Louise Saunders: young Sibilla
- Stefano Accorsi: Dino Campana
- Alessandro Haber: Andrea
- Galatea Ranzi: Leonetta
