= The Last Paradise =

2021 Italian film

- Italian: L'ultimo paradiso
- Directed by: Rocco Ricciardulli
- Written by: Rocco Ricciardulli; Riccardo Scamarcio
- Starring: Riccardo Scamarcio; Gaia Bermani Amaral; Valentina Cervi
- Cinematography: Gian Filippo Corticelli
- Music by: Federico Ferrandina
- Production companies: Lebowski; Netflix; Silver Productions
- Release date: 5 February 2021
- Running time: 107 minutes
- Country: Italy
- Language: Italian

The Last Paradise (Italian: L'ultimo paradiso) is a 2021 romantic drama film directed by Rocco Ricciardulli, written by Ricciardulli and Riccardo Scamarcio and starring Scamarcio, Gaia Bermani Amaral and Valentina Cervi.

== Plot ==
In an unnamed town in southern Italy in the 1950s, Ciccio Paradiso helps his fellow olive farmers resist the abusive mayor, Cumpà Schettino. At the same time, Ciccio, despite being married to Lucia, is a womanizer who enters into a passionate affair with Cumpà's eldest daughter, Bianca, and is abetted by Bianca's sister, Maria. After a discussion, Lucia and Ciccio agree to divorce amicably, with the latter seeking to ask Cumpà's permission to marry Bianca afterwards. However, Cosimo, Cumpà's right hand man, spies on Ciccio and Bianca on a date and reports them to Cumpà, who then confronts Bianca for lying about it. In response, Bianca strips naked in front of his father and berates him for raping a teenage worker on his olive farm before storming off. Cumpà, fed up with Ciccio for inciting his workers and his romance with Bianca, invites Ciccio to the Schettino residence, only to bludgeon him to death with a shovel, cut off his penis and send Ciccio's horse to town carrying his corpse.

Ciccio's estranged brother, Antonio, who works as an engineer in Trieste, returns to his hometown after 20 years upon learning of his brother's death to attend his funeral. While the family console themselves with his return, his timid father, Vincenzo tells him to leave and never return, telling him that Ciccio died for standing up to Cumpà. Antonio then goes to the Schettino residence and confronts Cumpà, who brags about the incident and dismisses his threats to expose him. Meanwhile, Bianca, who is locked away in the house during Antonio's visit, sneaks away to watch Ciccio's funeral. After Antonio leaves, Cumpà and Cosimo are murdered by an unknown assailant at the Schettino's barn. With both men dead, the townspeople, fed up with the Schettinos' oppression, ostracize Bianca and Maria and quit working as tenants at the Schettinos' olive farm, leaving the two on hard times as Bianca reminisces about her love for Ciccio.

Back in Trieste, Antonio continues to be shaken by Ciccio's death and sends letters to Bianca. Eventually, he breaks up with his girlfriend and leaves Trieste to settle in his hometown for good. Antonio visits the Schettinos at their residence but abruptly leaves after seeing a portrait of Bianca and Maria's deceased mother, Cesarina. He then confronts Vincenzo and recalls that he previously had a picture of Cesarina. Vincenzo then tells him that Maria is actually his daughter, explaining that he had an affair with Cesarina when she sought refuge in the Paradisos after being subjected to domestic abuse by Cumpà, who became frustrated when she gave birth to a girl, Bianca, as her first-born, rather than a son. As Antonio leaves, Vincenzo tells him that Cesarina died from suicide.

Bianca reads a letter from Antonio professing his love for her. She then searches for him at the town square, only to find that he had shaved his moustache and resembles Ciccio. Antonio proposes to marry her on the spot, which Bianca agrees to. As they celebrate, the townspeople, including the Paradisos, emerge and applaud the couple as they lead them to church.

== Production ==
The film was shot in the town of Gravina in Apulia and the cities of Bari and Trieste.

== Distribution ==
The film was released on the Netflix streaming platform on February 5, 2021. The first trailer was released on Netflix Italia's YouTube channel on January 12, 2021.

== Cast ==
- Riccardo Scamarcio as Ciccio and Antonio Paradiso
- Gaia Bermani Amaral as Bianca Schettino
- Valentina Cervi as Lucia
- Antonio Gerardi as Cumpà Schettino
- Giovanni Cirfiera as Brigadiere
- Peter Arpesella as Cumpà Schettino (voice)
- Giuseppe Nardone as Bracciante
