= Gaia Bermani Amaral =

Brazilian-Italian actress, model and television presenter

- Born: 16 September 1980 (age 45); São Paulo, Brazil
- Occupations: Actress; model; television presenter

Gaia Bermani Amaral (born 16 September 1980) is a Brazilian-Italian actress, model and television presenter.

== Life and career ==
Born in São Paulo, the daughter of a Brazilian fashion photographer and an Italian model, at young age Bermani Amaral moved with her family to Milan, where she studied at the Liceo classico Giuseppe Parini and later started working as a model and a spokesperson. She became first known in 2000, after appearing in a series of commercials for TIM. In 2001 she hosted the Rai 2 cinema magazine Stracult and made her debut as an actress in a stage adaptation of Sabrina. Bermani Amaral made her film debut in 2005, in Roberto Faenza's I giorni dell'abbandono. She later appeared in several TV-series and films.

== Filmography ==
=== Films ===
Year	Title	Role	Notes
2005	I giorni dell'abbandono	Carla	
2006	Il quarto sesso	Stella	Short film
2009	Polvere	Betty	
2010	The Woman of My Dreams	Irene	
2016	Suddenly Komir	Helene	
2016	West Coast	Gilda	
2018	Malati di sesso	Giovanna	
2019	The Noisy Silence	Wife	Short film
2021	The Last Paradiso	Bianca Schettino	Netflix Original film

=== Television ===
Year	Title	Role	Notes
2008	Capri	Roxanne	Recurring role; 3 episodes
2008	Amiche mie	Lulu	Recurring role; 8 episodes
2010	Crimini	Federica Actis	Episode: "Little Dream"
2011	Xanadu	Elise Jess	Main role; 8 episodes
2011–2013	Un passo dal cielo	Silvia Bussolati	Main role (seasons 1–2); 24 episodes
