= Valentina Cervi =

Italian actress

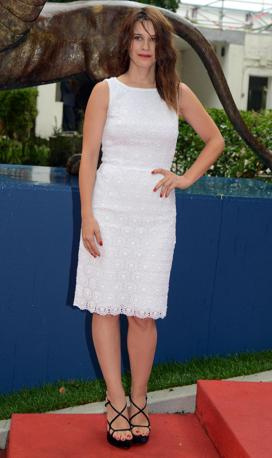
- Cervi in 2012
- Born: 13 April 1976 (age 50); Rome, Italy
- Occupation: Actress
- Years active: 1986–present
- Height: 1.7 m (5 ft 7 in)
- Spouse: Stefano Mordini
- Children: 2
- Father: Tonino Cervi
- Relatives: Gino Cervi (grandfather); Ninì Gordini (grandmother)

Valentina Cervi (born 13 April 1976) is an Italian film and television actress.

== Life and career ==
Cervi was born in Rome on 13 April 1976. She is the daughter of director Tonino Cervi and granddaughter of actor Gino Cervi. Her mother is the Italian producer of Austrian-Hungarian origin Marina Gefter. Cervi started her acting career at age ten in Carlo Cotti's 1986 film Portami la luna. She also played an English-language role in Jane Campion's 1996 The Portrait of a Lady.

One of her most acclaimed roles was the lead in the 1997 film Artemisia, directed by Agnès Merlet. It was loosely based on the painter Artemisia Gentileschi's life, but controversially portrayed the relationship between Agostino Tassi (played by Miki Manojlović) and Artemisia as a passionate affair rather than as rape.

In 2011, she appeared as Arianna in BBC TV's Italian detective mini-series Zen. She also appeared as "Valentina" in Canale 5's series Distretto di Polizia in 2011.

Cervi appeared as Bertha Mason in Cary Fukunaga's 2011 film adaptation of Jane Eyre. She was cast as the ancient vampire Salome in the HBO television drama True Blood.

She is married to director Stefano Mordini and has two children, Margherita (born 2013) and a son (born 2016).

She received the America Award of the Italy–USA Foundation in 2018.

== Filmography ==
=== Films ===
| Year | Title | Role(s) | Notes |
|---|---|---|---|
| 1988 | Mignon Has Come to Stay | Little girl | Cameo appearance |
| 1994 | Oasi | Claudia | |
| 1994 | The Night and the Moment | Dancer | Cameo appearance |
| 1996 | The Portrait of a Lady | Pansy Osmond | |
| 1996 | Escoriandoli | Sabrina | |
| 1997 | Artemisia | Artemisia Gentileschi | |
| 1998 | Children of Hannibal | Rita | |
| 1999 | Rien sur Robert | Aurélie Coquille | |
| 1999 | Branchie | Livia | |
| 1999 | Midsummer Night's Dance | Ines | |
| 2001 | Hotel | Hotel maid | Cameo appearance |
| 2002 | Soul Mate | Teresa | |
| 2003 | Past Perfect | Carola | |
| 2003 | Sansa | Valentina | |
| 2003 | The Tulse Luper Suitcases, Part 1: The Moab Story | Cissie Colpitts | |
| 2004 | The Tulse Luper Suitcases, Part 2: Vaux to the Sea | Cissie Colpitts | |
| 2004 | Tempesta | Dina Gusmano | |
| 2004 | The Tulse Luper Suitcases, Part 3: From Sark to the Finish | Cissie Colpitts | |
| 2005 | Provincia meccanica | Silvia Battaglia | |
| 2007 | Fine pena mai | Daniela Perrone | |
| 2008 | Miracle at St. Anna | Renata | |
| 2009 | Sleepless | Olga | |
| 2011 | Jane Eyre | Bertha Mason | |
| 2011 | R.I.F. | Valérie Monnereau | |
| 2012 | In a Rush | Ada Savigné | |
| 2013 | Mi rifaccio vivo | Amanda | |
| 2016 | Senza lasciare traccia | Elena | |
| 2016 | Ho amici in paradiso | Giulia | |
| 2017 | Dove non ho mai abitato | Laura | |
| 2017 | Agadah | Ines | |
| 2017 | Lasciami per sempre | Aida | |
| 2018 | Euphoria | Tatiana | |
| 2019 | Vivere | Azzurra | |
| 2020 | The Players | Lisa | |
| 2021 | Codice Karim | Gaia | |
| 2021 | The Last Paradiso | Lucia | |
| 2021 | The Catholic School | Eleonora Rummo | |
| 2022 | The Invisible Thread | Monica Ferrari | |
| 2022 | Marcel! | The Cousin | |
| 2023 | The Order of Time | Greta | |
| 2025 | Io non ti lascio solo | Adele | |

=== Television ===
| Year | Title | Role(s) | Notes |
|---|---|---|---|
| 1993 | I ragazzi del muretto | Laura | Episode: "L'amore quello vero" |
| 2001 | James Dean | Pier Angeli | Television movie |
| 2007 | War and Peace | Maria Bolkonskaya | Main role |
| 2008 | Donne assassine | Margherita | Episode: "Margherita" |
| 2011 | Zen | Arianna von Fakenhayn | Episodes: "Vendetta"; "Cabal" |
| 2011–2012 | Distretto di Polizia | Valentina Bini | Main role (season 11); 26 episodes |
| 2012 | True Blood | Salome Agrippa | Main role (season 5); 11 episodes |
| 2012–2015 | Una grande famiglia | Martina Ruggeri | Series regular |
| 2013 | Borgia | Caterina Sforza-Riaro | 2 episodes |
| 2015–2017 | Solo per amore | Gloria Keller | Main role |
| 2016 | Medici | Alessandra Albizzi | Recurring role; 3 episodes |
| 2019 | I ragazzi dello Zecchino d'Oro | Silvana | Television movie |
| 2024 | The Law According to Lidia Poët | Anna Cravero | Recurring role; 5 episodes |
| 2025 | Leopardi: Il poeta dell'infinito | Adelaide Antici Leopardi | Two-parts television movie |
| 2025 | Kabul | Francesca | Main role; 6 episodes |
