= The Invisible Witness =

- Theatrical release poster
- Directed by: Stefano Mordini
- Starring: Riccardo Scamarcio; Miriam Leone; Fabrizio Bentivoglio; Maria Paiato
- Cinematography: Luigi Martinucci
- Edited by: Massimo Fiocchi
- Music by: Fabio Barovero
- Production companies: Warner Bros. Entertainment Italia; Picomedia
- Distributed by: Warner Bros. Pictures
- Release date: 13 December 2018
- Running time: 102 minutes
- Country: Italy
- Language: Italian
- Box office: $5.3 million

The Invisible Witness (Italian: Il testimone invisibile) is a 2018 Italian crime thriller film directed by Stefano Mordini, starring Riccardo Scamarcio and Miriam Leone. It is a remake of the 2016 Spanish film The Invisible Guest.

== Cast ==
- Riccardo Scamarcio as Adriano Doria
- Miriam Leone as Laura Vitale
- Fabrizio Bentivoglio as Tommaso Garri
- Maria Paiato as Elvira Garri
- Sara Cardinaletti as Sonia
- Nicola Pannelli as Paolo
- Sergio Romano as agente dell'interrogatorio
- Paola Sambo as Virginia Ferrara
- Gerardo De Blasio as Daniele Ga
