= Three Steps Over Heaven =

2004 Italian romantic drama film

Tre metri sopra il cielo
- Theatrical release poster
- Directed by: Luca Lucini
- Written by: Federico Moccia; Gero Giglio; Teresa Ciabatti
- Produced by: Giovanni Stabilini; Marco Chimenz; Riccardo Tozzi
- Starring: Riccardo Scamarcio; Katy Saunders
- Cinematography: Manfredo Archinto
- Edited by: Raimondo Crociani
- Music by: Alessandro Forti; Francesco De Rosa
- Production company: Cattleya
- Distributed by: Warner Bros. Pictures
- Release date: 12 March 2004
- Running time: 99 minutes
- Country: Italy
- Language: Italian
- Box office: $916,927

Tre metri sopra il cielo (Italian pronunciation: [tre mˈmɛːtri ˈsoːpra il ˈtʃɛːlo]; Three steps over heaven) is an Italian romantic drama film, directed by Luca Lucini, based on the 1992 eponymous novel by Federico Moccia. It was released in cinemas in Italy on 12 March 2004.

== Plot ==
Rome. Stefano Mancini, nicknamed "Step" (Riccardo Scamarcio), and Roberta Gervasi, nicknamed "Babi" (Katy Saunders), belong to two completely different worlds. Babi's life is practically perfect: she is a well-behaved model student, beautiful, and has friends and courtiers. Her life is divided between home, school, and an elite social scene. Step, on the other hand, is a rebel with troubled family relationships (especially with his mother) and a violent side. He spends his time with his gang of friends, participating in clandestine motorcycle races and causing trouble around Rome. Fate brings them together and they fall in love. Their love story is a passionate and tumultuous tale of two young people from different backgrounds, further complicated by the opposition of Babi's parents. As Babi is introduced to a dangerous new world that is unknown to her, she begins to struggle in school, her relationships get challenged, and she is forced to make ethical decisions that challenge her ideas of right and wrong, but nothing is able to separate her from Step. The two have never been in love before, but Step's violent and unscrupulous life eventually goes too far: after the death of Step's friend, Pollo, who is dating Babi's friend Pallina, Babi decides to break up with Step permanently.

== Curiosity ==
Carmela Vincenti plays a teacher, a role she had already played (as imitation) in her debut film Compagni di scuola (School Companions).

The motorcycle used by Step in the film, is a Ghezzi-Brian Furia, a rare special author created on a Moto Guzzi engine. It is immediately recognizable by the characteristic two overlapping front headlights. When Babi sees for the first time the writing Io e te tre metri sopra il cielo (Me and you three steps over heaven), she is in the road that passes under Corso Francia in Rome.

The castle is located in the township of Santa Marinella.

== Differences between the film and the novel ==
The film has some substantial differences and omissions from the novel.

- In the novel, Babi is described as a slim girl with large blue eyes and long blond hair. In the film, Babi has brown hair and brown eyes. According to the writer Moccia, the film Babi is too beautiful compared to the Babi of the book.
- Babi's father's car is in the book is a Mercedes; in the movie it is a Jaguar.
- In the novel, Step first notices Babi in while sitting on his motorbike at a stop light in traffic and is so close to her car that he asks her to ride together. In the film, the first meeting between the two takes place while he is sitting with Pollo on a bench and he sees her passing in a car.
- In the novel, at the party, Step asks Chicco Brandelli to pour him a glass of Coca-Cola while he talks with Babi. In the fim, it is a glass of Champagne.
- In the book, after Babi throws Coca-Cola's into Step's face, he drags her into a bath in the villa and with the jet baths her completely in a shower, while in the movie it is a bathtub.
- In the book it is explained that Step's footsteps are due to having discovered that the mother has a relationship with another man, while in the movie Step is less violent.
- In the book Step competes for first in one of the greenhouse races and in the second race Babi is the groupie, but the race ends before the participants arrive at the finish line due to Babi's screams that stop the race after seeing a motorcyclist drops, while in the movie the two compete in the same race and Step wins.
- In the film it is only explained that Step attacks the mother's lover after finding them together, while in the novel this scene is described completely during the memories of the protagonist.
- In the movie the fight between Babi and Madda is completely different from the one told in the book.
- In the movie there are not references to the Brazilian Francesca who knows Claudio in a bar while he discussing with Step, while in the novel that content is inserted into the plot.
- In the novel the first time between Step and Babi takes place in an abandoned house, while in the movie takes place in a castle where Babi as a child dreamed of being a princess.
- In the film Step understands that having taken the necklace has been the Siciliano and comes to his home to resume it, while in the novel is not mentioned the place where he faces it. In addition, in the novel, the fight between Step and Siciliano takes place late in the evening, while in the film takes place in the afternoon. Finally, in the film, the fight between the two, is not shown, while in the novel it is described.
- In the novel is described a scene where Step, after Pollo's death, calls Babi's home asking if she's there, while in the movie this scene is absent.
- In the novel Paolo, Step's brother, does not admit that he also knew about his mother's cheating.

== Awards ==
- 2005 - Nastro d'argento : nomination Best producer (Riccardo Tozzi, Giovanni Stabilini and Marco Chimenz)
- 2004 - Globo d'oro : Best Actor Revelation at Riccardo Scamarcio

== Soundtrack ==
A CD of the movie soundtrack was released on 4 March 2004 in Italy. Tracks

1. "Intro" (Dj Bu$)
2. "Sere nere" (Tiziano Ferro)
3. "Gabriel" (Lamb)
4. "He's simple, he's dumb, he's the pilot" (Grandaddy)
5. "Interludio #1" (Dj Bu$)
6. "Radio caos" (De Luca & Forti)
7. "Can you do that?" (De Luca & Forti)
8. "Your deepest dream" (De Luca & Forti)
9. "Are you in love?" (De Luca & Forti)
10. "Nina" (Comedy of life)
11. "Centosessanta caratteri" (De Luca & Forti)
12. "Interludio #2" (Dj Bu$)
13. "Beyond your darkest dreaming" (De Luca & Forti)
14. "By my side" (Comedy of life)
15. "For the first time" (De Luca & Forti)
16. "Faster than life" (De Luca & Forti)
17. "Aqui otra vez" (Comedy of life)
18. "Wheeling" (La menade)
19. "Your hypnotic eyes" (De Luca & Forti)
20. "02:12 Am" (De Luca & Forti)
21. Il lungo addio (De Luca & Forti)
22. "Outro" (Dj Bu$)
23. "E se ne va" (Le Vibrazioni)
24. "Nuts on Ya Chin" (Eazy-E)

== Sequel ==
On 9 March 2007, the sequel Ho voglia di te (English: I Want You) was released based on the book of the same title.

== Remake ==
In 2010, a Spanish remake of the film was made, Tres metros sobre el cielo, directed by Fernando González Molina and starring María Valverde, Mario Casas, Nerea Camacho and Diego Martín.
