= The Players (2020 film) =

2020 film

- Film poster
- Italian: Gli infedeli
- Directed by: Stefano Mordini
- Written by: Filippo Bologna; Stefano Mordini
- Starring: Valerio Mastandrea; Laura Chiatti; Marina Foïs; Riccardo Scamarcio; Valentina Cervi; Euridice Axen
- Production companies: 102 Distribution; HT Film; Indigo Film
- Distributed by: Netflix
- Release date: July 15, 2020
- Running time: 88 minutes
- Country: Italy
- Language: Italian

The Players (Italian: Gli infedeli) is a 2020 Italian comedy film directed by Stefano Mordini, written by Filippo Bologna and Stefano Mordini and starring Riccardo Scamarcio, Valerio Mastandrea and Laura Chiatti. It's a remake of the 2012 French movie of the same name.

== Cast ==
- Riccardo Scamarcio as Lorenzo
- Valerio Mastandrea as Favini
- Laura Chiatti as Silvia
- Valentina Cervi as Lisa
- Marina Foïs as Wife
- Alessia Giuliani as Cristina
- Filipo Bolonia as Rudi
- Massimiliano Gallo as Zordini
- Aglaia Mora as Natalia
- Arianna Ninchi as Giulia
- Lorenzo Salpini as Vittorio
- Paolo de Pascale as Marcelo
- Lucilla Silvani as Burbera
- Francesca Sorbelli as Valeria

== Release ==
The Players was released on July 15, 2020, on Netflix.
