= Sapore di te =

- Theatrical release poster
- Directed by: Carlo Vanzina
- Written by: Carlo Vanzina; Enrico Vanzina
- Starring: Serena Autieri; Nancy Brilli; Eugenio Franceschini; Matteo Leoni; Virginie Marsan; Maurizio Mattioli; Giorgio Pasotti; Katy Saunders; Martina Stella; Vincenzo Salemme
- Cinematography: Enrico Lucidi
- Music by: Giuliano Taviani; Carmelo Travia
- Distributed by: Medusa Film
- Release date: 19 January 2014
- Running time: 90 minutes
- Country: Italy
- Language: Italian

Sapore di te (transl. Your taste) is a 2014 Italian romantic comedy film directed by Carlo Vanzina and written by Carlo and Enrico Vanzina. It depicts the lives of several groups of characters interacting at the beach of Forte dei Marmi during the mid-1980s. The film is set thirty years after the Vanzinas' 1982 film Sapore di mare, also set at Forte dei Marmi, but is not a sequel to that film.

== Cast ==
- Vincenzo Salemme as Onorevole Piero De Marco
- Maurizio Mattioli as Alberto Proietti
- Nancy Brilli as Elena Proietti
- Katy Saunders as Sabrina Proietti
- Serena Autieri as Susy Acampora
- Martina Stella as Anna Malorni
- Giorgio Pasotti as: Armando Malenotti
- Andrea Pucci as Sandro
- Valeria Graci as Michela
- Fiammetta Cicogna as Nicoletta
