= Ho voglia di te =

2007 film

- Theatrical release poster
- Directed by: Luis Prieto
- Written by: Federico Moccia; Marcello Daciano; Teresa Ciabatti
- Based on: Ho voglia di te by Federico Moccia
- Produced by: Giovanni Stabilini; Marco Chimenz; Riccardo Tozzi
- Starring: Riccardo Scamarcio; Laura Chiatti; Katy Saunders
- Cinematography: Manfredo Archinto
- Edited by: Fabrizio Rossetti
- Music by: Ivan Iusco
- Production company: Cattleya
- Distributed by: Warner Bros. Pictures
- Release date: 9 March 2007
- Running time: 106 minutes
- Country: Italy
- Language: Italian
- Box office: $18.5 million

Ho voglia di te (lit. 'I Want You') is a 2007 romantic drama film directed by Luis Prieto, based on a novel of the same name by Federico Moccia. The film is the sequel to Three Steps Over Heaven. The main actor is Riccardo Scamarcio as Step and the main actress is Laura Chiatti, playing the role of Gin. Another important role is the one of Babi, played by Katy Louise Saunders.

== Plot ==
After spending two years in America to forget Babi, get away from his mother and try not to think about the death of his best friend Pollo, Step returns to Rome, aware that everything can start over at any moment. He will meet the extrovert and exuberant Ginevra Biro called Gin, a girl who - in one of the last scenes of the film - it turns out has been following Step for a long time and has always been in love with him, even before Step met Babi. The two will experience a love story of ups and downs, but when Step is invited to a party with old friends, he meets Babi again, grown and beautiful, who takes him to the place of their first time. Step realizes he is making a mistake and so he confides to Babi that he has fallen in love with someone else. The latter confesses to Step that she wanted to see him, also saying that she will get married in a few months. Step confesses to Gin that she saw Babi; Gin feels betrayed and disappointed and leaves Step. But in the end, proving that he really loves her, Step manages to make up for it with a wonderful photo of them kissing in front of the girl's house, followed by the words "I want you".

== Differences between the film and the novel ==
The film presents some substantive differences and omissions relative to the novel.

- At the beginning of the film there is no mention of Step's encounter with the hostess on the plane and their subsequent sex relationship in the hotel.
- In the novel, Step encounters Gin about a month after his return, not the first night as mentioned in the film.
- In the novel, the boy Daniela wants to lose virginity is Chicco Brandelli, but in the film his name is Marco Flamini (Babi's former boyfriend in the book Three Meters Above the Sky).
- Paul, Step's brother, does not admit that he also knew of the betrayal of his mother (he had mentioned it in Three Meters Above the Sky).
- In the book there is no reference to Chloe's motion while in the movie Step will compete for re-launch.
- Babi's father does not have a lover, his wife continues to suspect but in reality her husband simply goes to billiards in his evening outings. In fact, in the book, the lover really does exist and is called Francesca, a colored girl he met in the room where in the first book he took Step for a chat and for which he would leave his wife at the end of the book.
- In Gin's book, he is subjected to an attempted violence by the two camerino authors, where he will step out by killing two of his colleagues, in the film is Eleonora's friend to undergo it by one author during the party organized for the program. As a result, the trip that Step's leader gave him and Gin as a prize for denouncing the authors was missed.
- Marcantonio and Eleonora are together at the end of the film.
- There is no mention of the friendship relationship between Step and Gin's mother.
- Step's father's new girlfriend is not mentioned.
- In the book we talk about the little girl (daughter of the nurse) fascinated by Step's old love story, there is no girl in the movie or the girl's mother. Gin in the book thought of waiting for a child and discovering the last relationship between Step and Babi in the Church.
- In the book as a "goliardic gesture" Step writes "I want you" in front of Gin's house. In the film, the gesture is made by the writers even more goliardic, the same text covers much of Tiberina Island.
- Gin is a virgin in the novel, which is not mentioned in the film.

== Soundtrack ==
The Original Motion Picture Soundtrack was composed by Ivan Iusco and mixed at Forum Music Village. It was released in March 2007 on CD including a selection of 20 tracks.

Tracklist

1. "Ti scatterò una foto" (Tiziano Ferro)
2. "Cold water" (Damien Rice)
3. "Hear me out" (Frou Frou)
4. "La paura che..." (Tiziano Ferro)
5. "Hold on" (Good Charlotte)
6. "The passenger" (Iggy Pop)
7. "Lovelight" (Robbie Williams)
8. "Coming Around Again" (Simon Webbe)
9. "Love is blindness" (Cassandra Wilson)
10. "Danza nel buio" (La Menade)
11. "Tarantula" (Faithless)
12. "So far" (Ivan Iusco)
13. "Adventures" (Ivan Iusco)
14. "Ho voglia di te" (Ivan Iusco)
15. "Missing you" (Ivan Iusco)
16. "Me and the amplifier" (Ivan Iusco)
17. "The race" (Ivan Iusco)
18. "The strange stone" (Ivan Iusco)
19. "So far (Reprise)" (Ivan Iusco)
20. "Over the sky" (Ivan Iusco)

== Critical reception ==
Upon release, the film was the subject of controversy for the explicit sex scene between Riccardo Scamarcio and Laura Chiatti and the scene of sexual violence involving Eleonora.

Critic Paolo Mereghetti called the film an example of non-cinema.

== Remake ==
Just like in the first film, in 2012, a remake of the film, titled Tengo ganas de ti, was made. The film have a Spanish production directed by Fernando González Molina and played by Mario Casas, Clara Lago and María Valverde.
