= Escoriandoli =

- Directed by: Antonio Rezza
- Written by: Antonio Rezza; Flavia Mastrella
- Starring: Antonio Rezza; Valentina Cervi; Isabella Ferrari; Claudia Gerini; Valeria Golino
- Cinematography: Roberto Meddi
- Edited by: Jacopo Quadri
- Music by: Francesco Magnelli; Gianni Maroccolo
- Release date: 1996
- Language: Italian

Escoriandoli is a 1996 Italian surreal comedy film written and directed by Antonio Rezza. It entered the "Window on Images" section at the 53rd Venice International Film Festival.

== Cast ==
- Antonio Rezza: Giuliano/Rolando/Prof.ssa Coatta/Giacane/Elio
- Valentina Cervi: Sabrina
- Isabella Ferrari: Tarcisia
- Claudia Gerini: Lauretta
- Valeria Golino: Ida
