= Euphoria (2018 film) =

2018 film

- Italian film poster
- Italian: Euforia
- Directed by: Valeria Golino
- Written by: Valeria Golino
- Produced by: Viola Prestieri
- Starring: Riccardo Scamarcio; Valerio Mastandrea; Isabella Ferrari; Valentina Cervi; Jasmine Trinca
- Cinematography: Gergely Pohárnok
- Edited by: Giogiò Franchini
- Music by: Nicola Tescari
- Release date: 15 May 2018 (Cannes)
- Running time: 115 minutes
- Country: Italy
- Language: Italian

Euphoria (Italian: Euforia) is a 2018 Italian drama film directed by Valeria Golino. It was screened in the Un Certain Regard section at the 2018 Cannes Film Festival.

== Cast ==
- Riccardo Scamarcio as Matteo
- Valerio Mastandrea as Ettore
- Isabella Ferrari as Michela
- Valentina Cervi as Tatiana
- Jasmine Trinca as Elena
- Francesco Borgese as Andrea
- Andrea Germani as Luca
- Marzia Ubaldi as Ettore and Matteo's Mother
- Iaia Forte as Viola
