= Kabul (TV series) =

European television series

- Screenplay by: Olivier Demangel; Thomas Finkielkraut; Joe Lavy
- Directed by: Kasia Adamik; Olga Chajdas
- Starring: Shervin Alenabi; Jonathan Zaccaï; Thibault Evrard; Vassilis Kukalani; Jeanne Goursaud; Gianmarco Saurino; Valentina Cervi; Eric Dane
- Countries of origin: France, Italy, Germany, Belgium, Greece, Netherlands, Sweden, Denmark, Finland, Iceland, Norway
- Original language: English
- No. of series: 1
- No. of episodes: 6

Production
- Producers: Matthias Weber; Thibault Gast; Fabienne Servan-Schreiber; Charlotte Ortiz
- Production companies: 24 25 Films; Cinétévé; Panache Production; La Compangnie Cinematographique; Blonde Productions; France Televisions; ZDF; NPO; VRT; SVT; DR; YLE; RÚV; NRK; Cosmote TV; RAI

Original release
- Network: Series Mania
- Release: March 2025

Kabul is a six-part English-language drama television series set against the backdrop of American troops leaving Afghanistan in 2021. A pan-European co-production, the series had its world premiere at Series Mania in France in March 2025.

== Premise ==
The six-part drama series is set against the backdrop of the American government's withdrawal, from 15 August 2021, of their troops from Afghanistan, as the Taliban takes over control. It focuses on the experiences of the fictional Nazany family and the choices they have to make. Zahara, the mother, is a prosecutor who has prosecuted Taliban fighters and is now on their 'kill list'. She heads for the French embassy with Baqir, her husband, hoping to be evacuated to France. Amina, the daughter, has recently trained as a doctor at the hospital in Kabul, and slowly realises she now faces the end of her career. Fazal, the son, has previously fought against the Taliban with ISIS and is now a checkpoint commander in the Afghan Army and also working with the CIA as an informant. The series also illustrates the growing crisis through the eyes of German soldiers, French police, European diplomats, and American intelligence agents, as they try to co-ordinate the evacuation.

== Cast ==
- Shervin Alenabi
- Jonathan Zaccaï
- Thibault Evrard
- Vassilis Kukalani
- Jeanne Goursaud
- Gianmarco Saurino
- Valentina Cervi
- Eric Dane
- Hannah Abdoh

== Production ==
Described as "an ambitious European production", the series was produced by 2425 Films and Cinétévé in co-operation with the European Alliance, involving a multi-national co-production. French distributor Mediawan holds worldwide distribution rights. It was written by Olivier Demangel, Thomas Finkielkraut and Joe Lavy, and directed by Polish directors Kasia Adamik and Olga Chajdas. Producers are Fabienne Servan-Schreiber and Charlotte Ortiz for Cinétévé, and Matthias Weber, and Thibault Gast for 24 25 Films. The cast includes Jonathan Zaccaï, Thibault Evrard, Vassilis Kukalani, Jeanne Goursaud, Gianmarco Saurino, Valentina Cervi, Eric Dane, and Shervin Alenabi. Filming began in April 2024 near Athens, Greece.

Kabul was one of the final shows starring Eric Dane prior to his death in February 2026.

== Broadcast ==
The series had its world premiere at Series Mania in France in March 2025.

In Australia, it premiered on free-to-air TV channel SBS Viceland, and its streaming service SBS on Demand, both on 30 October 2025. In the US it was streamed by StarzTV during 2025. In the UK it was purchased by the BBC, aired on BBC Four, and was released on iPlayer on 2 August 2026.

== Reception ==
The series was generally reviewed positively. Writing in Tbreak, Abbas Jaffar Ali described it as "a fascinating watch" and said that "visually, the show absolutely delivers". "The Nazany family's unravelling gives you emotional grounding" and "some drama arcs genuinely invest you", but he suggests that the writing is "content just to simmer" rather than deliver a dramatic payoff. Nick Lee, the BBC's head of programme acquisition, said that "Kabul is a tragedy of the highest stakes" that "dramatises the biggest view of history through the smallest window of a human family".. Writing in Cineuropa, Martin Kudlac said that its "procedural pacing, multi-perspective structure and genre infusion align it with current trends in international drama", and that the "direction maintains consistent pressure" across the converging plotlines.

Jack Seale, writing in The Guardian after the series's UK airing, scored it at four out of five, calling it "gripping". He wrote "This tense, powerful six-parter starkly captures the nation’s slide into oppressive terror. Its capturing of a shameful moment in history is hugely vivid".
