= Pericle (film) =

2016 film

- Film poster
- Directed by: Stefano Mordini
- Written by: Francesca Marciano; Stefano Mordini; Valia Santella
- Starring: Riccardo Scamarcio; Marina Foïs; Gigio Morra; Valentina Acca; Maria Luisa Santella; Gianluca Di Gennaro; Lucia Ragni
- Cinematography: Matteo Cocco
- Edited by: Jacopo Quadri
- Music by: Peter von Poehl
- Release date: 12 May 2016
- Running time: 104 minutes
- Country: Italy
- Language: Italian
- Box office: US$167,439

Pericle (Italian: Pericle il Nero) is a 2016 Italian crime drama film directed by Stefano Mordini. It was screened in the Un Certain Regard section at the 2016 Cannes Film Festival.

== Plot ==
Pericle is the henchman of Don Pietro, the boss of a powerful Camorra gang based in Belgium. His specialty is sodomizing victims, compelling their submission to the will of the organization. After making a fatal mistake during a punitive mission, he finds himself sentenced to death, and is forced to escape to France, where an unexpected encounter makes him reflect on his life.

== Cast ==
- Riccardo Scamarcio as Pericle
- Marina Foïs as Anastasia
- Gigio Morra as Don Luigi
- Nissim Renard as Vincent
- Valentina Acca as Anna
- Lou Lambrecht as Stella
- Maria Luisa Santella as Signorinella
- Lucia Ragni as Aunt Nenè

== Reception ==
Pericle grossed $167,439 at the box office.
