= Xanadu (TV series) =

- Original language: French
- No. of seasons: 1
- No. of episodes: 8

Production
- Camera setup: Multi-camera

Original release
- Network: ARTE
- Release: April 30, 2011

Xanadu is a French television-series, also known as The Money Shot in the UK and the US, where it is shown on Walter Presents.

== Content ==
The focus of the series is the eponymous porn film production company Xanadu of the Valadine family. The company has financial problems, because Alex, pater familias and founder of the company, does not want to get involved in the gonzo genre, which now defines the industry. His son Laurent, however, has recognized the signs of the times and wants to reposition Xanadu. In the background of the series is the story of Elise Jess, Alex's first wife and mother of the three children Laurent, Sarah and Lapo (her name references French 1980s porn star Marilyn Jess). Elise Jess was the showcase of the company as an actress until she died under unexplained circumstances. Her death is cleared up in the last of the eight episodes.

== Cast ==
- Jean-Baptiste Malartre: Alex Valadine
- Alex Lutz: Young Alex Valadine
- Julien Boisselier: Laurent Valadine
- Nathalie Blanc: Sarah Valadine
- Swann Arlaud: Lapo Valadine
- Nora Arnezeder: Varvara Valadine
- Judith Henry: Anne Valadine
- Gaia Bermani Amaral: Elise Jess
- Solène Rigot: Marine Valadine
- Audrey Bastien: Bettany Valadine
- Phil Holliday: Brendon
- Jeffrey Barbeau: Julius
- Mathilde Bisson: Lou
