= Söjtör =

- Location of Söjtör in Hungary
- Coordinates: 46.67267°N 16.85365°E
- Country: Hungary
- Region: Western Transdanubia
- County: Zala
- Subregion: Zalaegerszegi
- Rank: Village

Area
  - Total: 36.16 km^{2} (13.96 sq mi)

Population (1 January 2008)
  - Total: 1,549
  - Density: 42.84/km^{2} (110.9/sq mi)
- Time zone: UTC+1 (CET)
  - Summer (DST): UTC+2 (CEST)
- Postal code: 8897
- Area code: +36 92
- KSH code: 19080
- Website: sojtor.eu

Söjtör is a village of approximately 1500 people located in Zala County, in western Hungary. It is the birthplace of Ferenc Deák, (1803–1876) a Hungarian statesman living in the 19th century who served as the Minister of Justice during the Hungarian Revolution of 1848, and is known as "The Sage of the Nation".
