= Marie Festetics =

Hungarian countess (1839–1923)

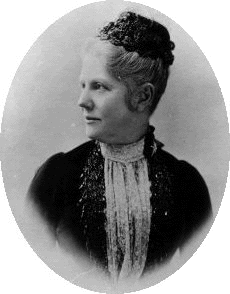
Countess Marie Festetics

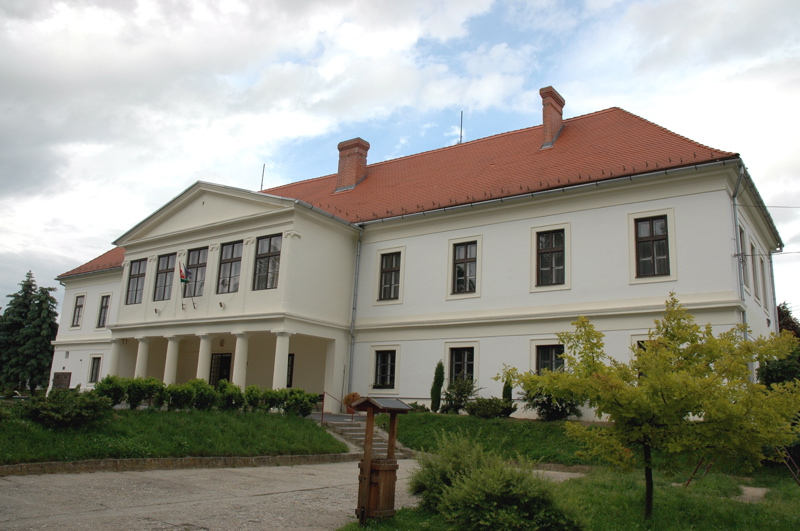
Marie's residence: Festetics castle in Söjtör, Hungary

Countess Marie Festetics von Tolna (20 October 1839 – 16 April 1923), was an Austro-Hungarian countess, diarist and lady-in-waiting.

== Family ==
Countess Mária Terézia was born in Tolna, Kingdom of Hungary, into the collateral branch of an old and distinguished House of Festetics, as the fifth child and fourth daughter of Count Sandor Festetics von Tolna (1805–1877) and his Saxon wife, Baroness Josephine von Boxberg (1811–1892), the daughter of Baron Friedrich Karl von Boxberg (1788–1866), who served as an Imperial and Royal (k.u.k.) Major General in the Austrian Imperial Army. Her sibling were: Countess Ilona (1830-1843), Countess Adél (1833-1879), Count Károly (1836-1879), Countess Matild (1838-1870) and Count Viktor (1840-1884).

== Imperial Lady-in-waiting ==
Following financial difficulties that were caused by her father, forcing her family to abandon their estate in Tolna and relocate to their lesser estate in Söjtör, Countess Marie Festetics was compelled to enter imperial service to support herself. She served as lady-in-waiting to Empress Elisabeth of Austria from 1870, and became one of the favorites and confidantes of the Empress. She was also a noted diarist and her diaries are regarded as an important source of the Imperial Austrian court.

== Death ==
Countess Marie died on 16 April 1923 at the age of 83 at Festetics castle, her family estate in Söjtör, Zala County, Kingdom of Hungary.
