= King Otto (film) =

2021 documentary by Christopher André Marks

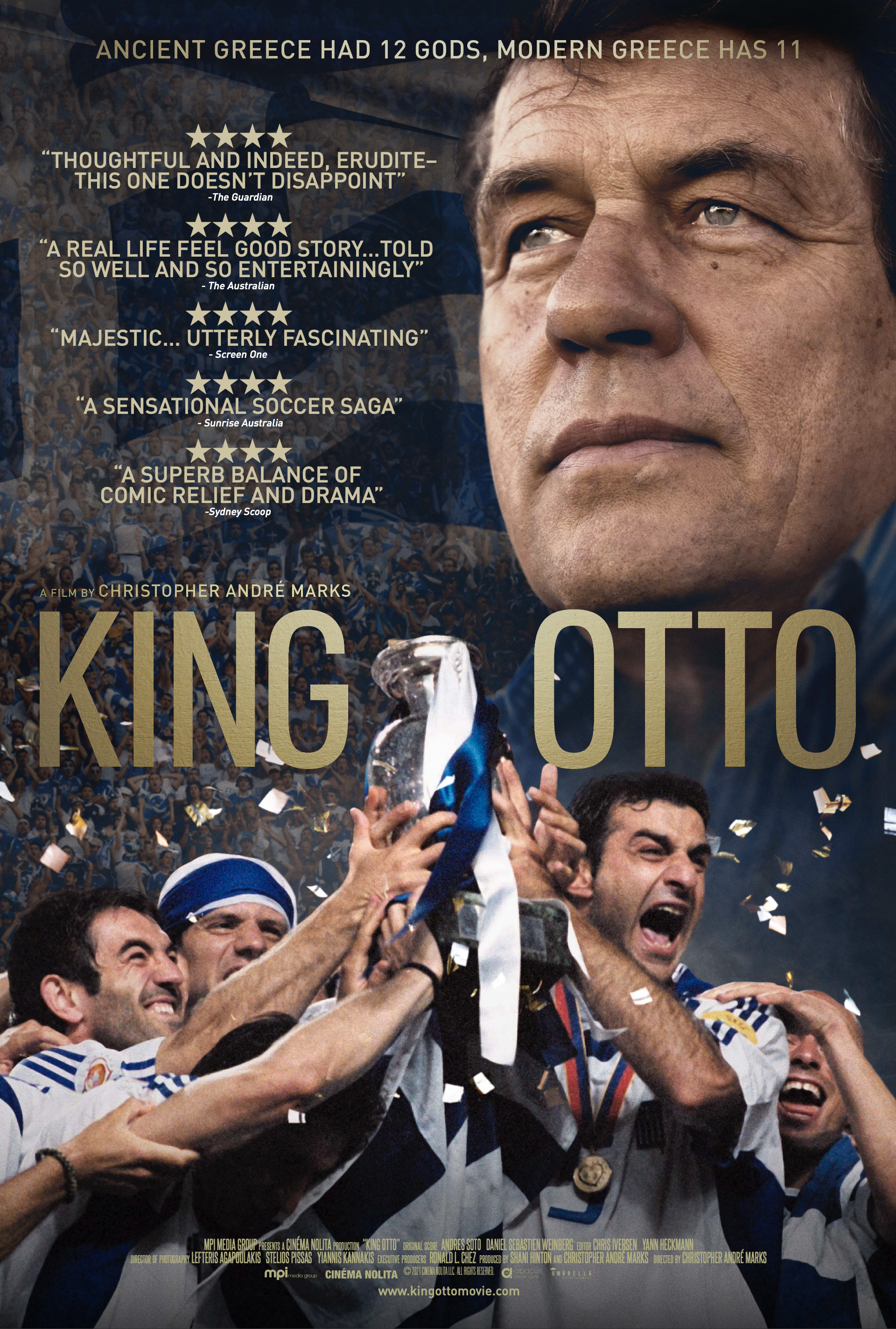
- Theatrical release poster
- Directed by: Christopher André Marks
- Written by: Christopher André Marks
- Produced by: Shani Hinton; Christopher André Marks
- Starring: Otto Rehhagel; Ioannis Topalidis; Giorgos Karagounis; Traianos Dellas; Takis Fyssas; Giourkas Seitaridis; Antonios Nikopolidis; Vassilis Gagatsis
- Cinematography: Lefteris Agapoulakis; Stelios Pissas; Yannis Kannakis
- Edited by: Chris Iversen; Yann Heckmann
- Music by: Andrés Soto; Dan Weinberg
- Production company: Cinéma Nolita
- Distributed by: Filmwelt Verleihagentur GmbH (Germany); Tanweer (Greece); Sky (United Kingdom); MPI Media (United States)
- Release dates: May 27, 2021 (Australia); June 5, 2021 (United Kingdom); September 16, 2021 (Greece); November 11, 2021 (Germany); March 25, 2022 (United States)
- Running time: 82 minutes
- Countries: United States; Greece; United Kingdom; Germany
- Languages: Greek; German; English; French

King Otto (German: König Otto, Greek: Βασιλιάς Όττο) is a 2021 documentary film directed by Christopher André Marks. The film tells the story of the victory of the Greece National Football Team at the 2004 European Championships.

== Plot ==
The Greece National Football Team at UEFA Euro 2004 are ranked 300 - 1, and had never won a game in a major international football tournament. Otto Rehhagel has left everything behind in his native Germany to take on the underachieving national team. Matched against the giants of European football, the coach and the team come together to write a new chapter in Greek mythology and to achieve one of the biggest shocks in sports history.

== Reception ==
The Guardian in the United Kingdom gave the film 4 stars calling it "thoughtful and indeed, erudite" claiming that the climax moment of the film, when the Greeks win the Euro was "one of the most uplifting things I have ever seen". The Australian credited the filmmakers giving the film 4 out of 4 stars saying "full marks must be awarded to André Marks for telling this real life feel good story so well and so entertainingly." The Sydney Morning Herald said the film is "technically a documentary but comes across as an Aesopian fable". Maxim magazine called the film "a fairytale for modern times" and Financial Review said: "This irresistible documentary King Otto manages to confirm and confound every idea about the contrasts between the Greeks and the Germans.... the Athenians must have partied hard after they defeated the Persians in the battle of Marathon in 490BC – but not like this." The German press heralded the film with the Frankfurter Allgemeine Zeitung praising the film as "a brilliant documentary, impressive and touching. Der Spiegel called the film "a fairytale" and Kölner Stadt-Anzeiger praised the film as "cinema at its finest... bravo!". Süddeutsche Zeitung stated that the movie "was a very solid, very well made homage to Otto, the very first." The Greek press reviewed the film with the top critics at Proto Thema, 24/7 News and Athens Voice giving the film high marks. Proto Thema called the film "exemplary" and Kathimerini profiled the director and called the story of 2004 "our favorite national fairy tale" with To Vima also covering the film favorably. In the United Kingdom, the BBC called it "a beautiful, beautiful film" with The Times and The Daily Telegraph choosing it as a 'Critic's Pick' upon release. In the United States, Noel Murray of the Los Angeles Times called the film "An entertaining, real life Ted Lasso – a great story, crisply told."

== Release ==
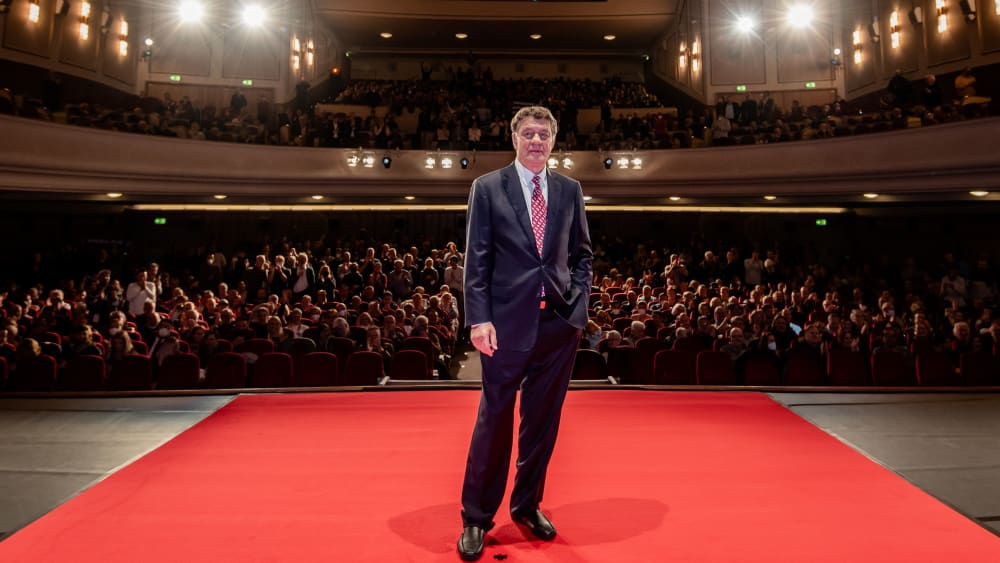
Otto Rehhagel at German premiere

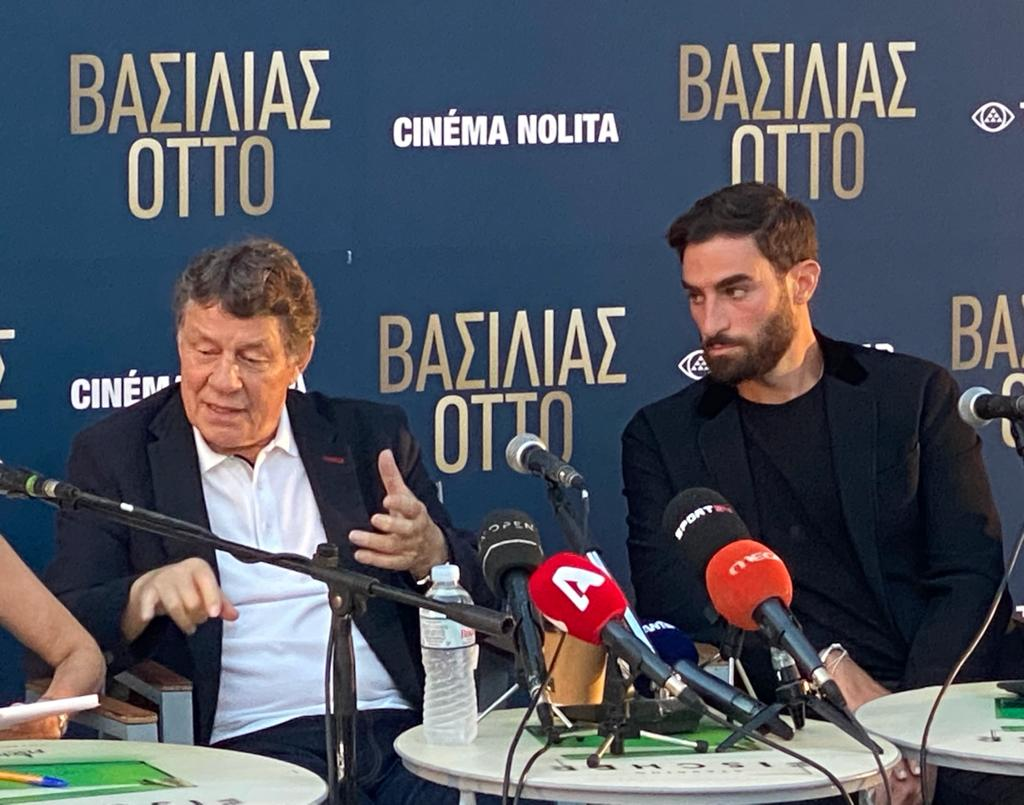
Otto Rehhagel and director Christopher André Marks at Greek premiere

The film was released in over 75 countries worldwide either theatrically or on streaming platforms making it one of the widest released Greek language films on record. It had its world premiere in Melbourne, Australia, at The Astor Theatre to multiple sold out preview screenings and was then released nationally in over 80 cinemas across Australia. On the day of the theatrical release, Melbourne went into a total lockdown and cinemas were closed for weeks preventing the film from having its full theatrical run in Victoria. The Greek premiere was held at the Zappeion in the National Garden of Athens with the players of the 2004 Greece National Team in attendance. The film was subsequently released theatrically nationwide in Greece. The German premiere was held at the historic Lichtburg cinema in Essen on Nov 11, 2021 in the hometown of Otto Rehhagel. The sold out theatre of 1,000+ gave the film and its star, Otto Rehhagel, a loud standing ovation and cheered throughout the premiere as if in a football stadium. As Kicker notes, "Applause, cheering and singing resounded again and again..." On the first day of the German release, Otto Rehhagel was honored with his hands moulded into gold to adorn the walls of the Lichtburg lobby. The film was also released on SKY UK and Amazon Prime Video in the United Kingdom, Warner Bros. Discovery in South America, Viaplay in the Nordics and Al Jazeera in the Middle East among other territories. It can also be seen on Qantas, Emirates and Lufthansa Airlines entertainment systems. The film was released theatrically in the United States and Canada on March 25, 2022, Greek Independence Day. It had a full theatrical run in cities like New York, Chicago, Boston, San Francisco, Los Angeles and Toronto among others. The North American premiere was held at the Museum of Modern Art in Manhattan with "ambassadors, diplomats, media personalities, athletes and hundreds of others".
