= Archduchess Sophie of Austria =

Austrian archduchess (1855–1857)

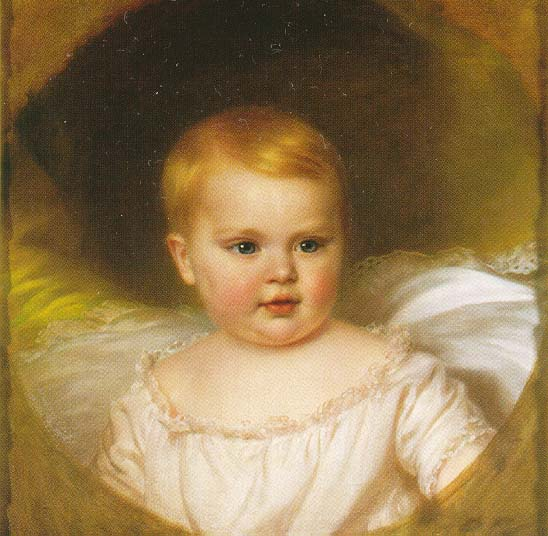
- Sophie in c. 1856
- Born: 5 March 1855; Laxenburg castles, Vienna, Austrian Empire
- Died: 29 May 1857 (aged 2); Buda, Kingdom of Hungary, Austrian Empire
- Burial: Imperial Crypt, Vienna
Names
- Sophie Friederike Dorothea Maria Josepha
- House: Habsburg-Lorraine
- Father: Franz Joseph I of Austria
- Mother: Elisabeth of Bavaria

Archduchess Sophie of Austria (5 March 1855 – 29 May 1857) was the first child of Emperor Franz Joseph I and Empress Elisabeth of Austria. She died aged two.

== Life ==
Within two months of her marriage to Franz Joseph, Elisabeth was pregnant. On 5 March 1855, the 17-year-old Empress of Austria delivered a daughter who was christened the same day, without Elisabeth's knowledge or consent, Sophie Friederike Dorothea Maria Josepha, after Franz Joseph's domineering mother. On both her mother and her father's side, Sophie descended from King Maximilian I Joseph of Bavaria, as her parents were first cousins. On her father's side, she descended from the last Holy Roman Emperor, Francis II. During the next year, Elisabeth delivered another daughter, Archduchess Gisela, a younger sister to Sophie. Although they were both girls and did not need to be educated for duties a monarch would be obliged to fulfill, both infants right after being baptised were taken away from Elisabeth by Archduchess Sophie (who was both Elisabeth's aunt and mother-in-law) on account of the Empress being too young to raise two children. Elisabeth later commented:

She took my children from me straight away. I was only allowed to see them when Sophie [of Bavaria] gave her consent. She was always present when I went to visit the children. Eventually I could only concede to her and only seldom went up to see them

No matter how long Elisabeth begged Franz Joseph to discuss the matter with his mother, her cries went unheard. Eventually, Franz Joseph did discuss the problem with his mother and Elisabeth eventually began to openly express her wishes to her mother-in-law and even took the little girls with her as she travelled.

== Death ==
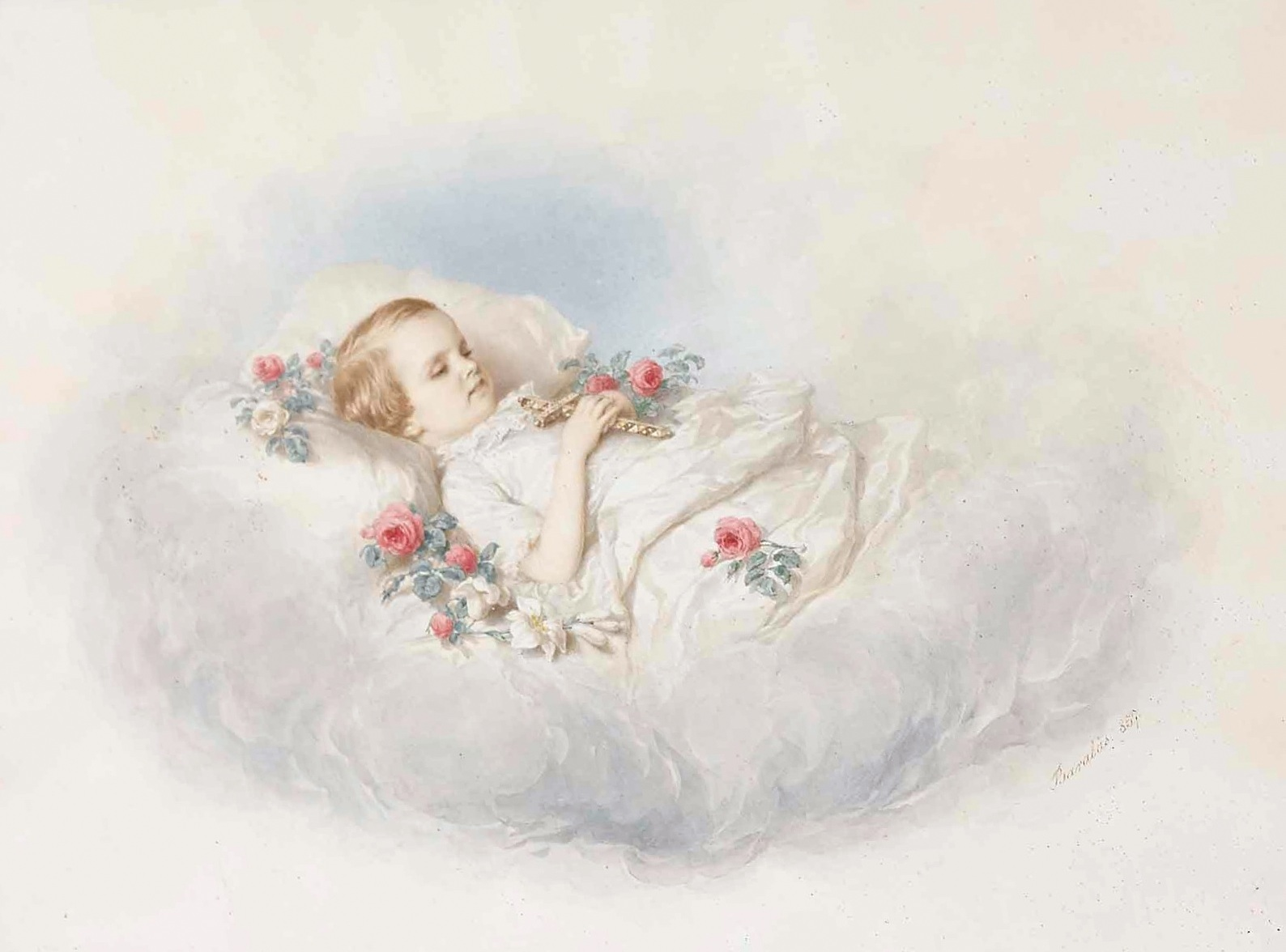
Archduchess Sophie lying in rest, 1857

Empress Elisabeth adored Hungary and its people and proposed to her husband that they take a trip to her favourite country, perhaps even tour it. Franz Joseph accepted and they left in early spring 1857. While in Buda, both Sophie and her sister Archduchess Gisela fell ill with diarrhea and had a very high fever. 10-month-old Gisela recovered quickly. However, two-year-old Sophie died in her mother's arms at 21:15 in the evening, after eleven hours of struggling to survive, probably from dehydration due to the diarrhea or from convulsions due to the high fever. It was later theorized that Sophie died from typhoid fever, but this is yet to be proven.

== Aftermath ==
Sophie's body was brought back to Vienna and buried in the Imperial Crypt, in Ferdinand's Vault within the southwest pier.

The death of her oldest child would haunt Empress Elisabeth for her entire life. Elisabeth was blamed for Sophie's death by her mother-in-law Archduchess Sophie (née Princess Sophie of Bavaria). She suffered a breakdown and would lock herself in her apartments for days at a time or go riding until she reached a state of exhaustion, just to avoid having to think. Sophie's death also settled the matter of the imperial children's custody. Princess Sophie took the children, now without opposition, as soon as they were born and kept them from their mother as punishment and to ensure there would be no more early deaths. Elisabeth also started to neglect her surviving daughter, and their relationship was not a close one. One of Elisabeth's ladies-in-waiting, Marie Festetics, commented in her diary that the Empress did not even take the time to attend Gisela's wedding preparations. Elisabeth also behaved in a similar manner to her only son, Rudolf, Crown Prince of Austria. For the rest of her remaining days, Elisabeth would wear a bracelet with a likeness of her dead daughter and kept a portrait of her in her apartments.

== Gallery ==
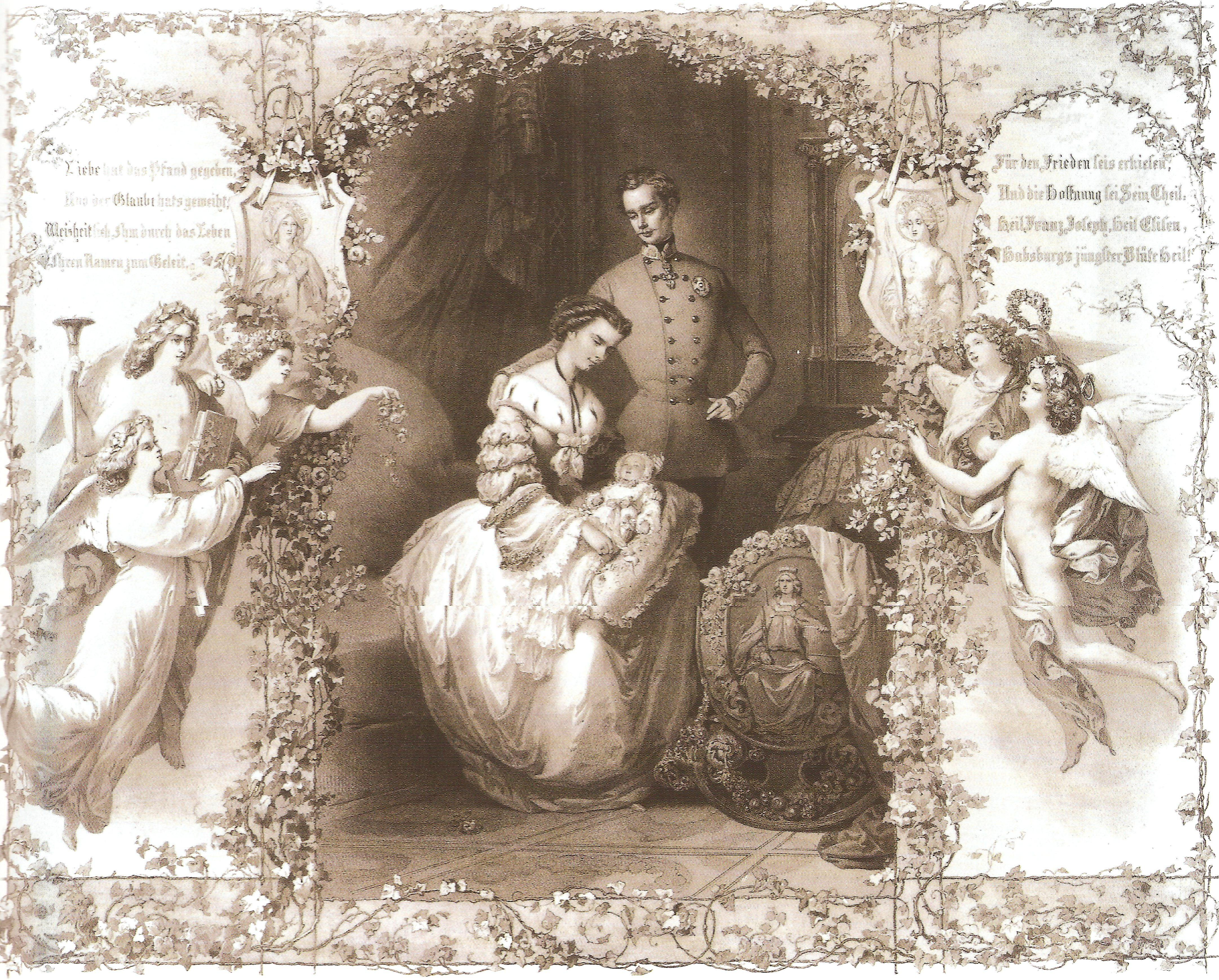
"Birth of Sophie", a lithograph by Joseph Kriehuber.

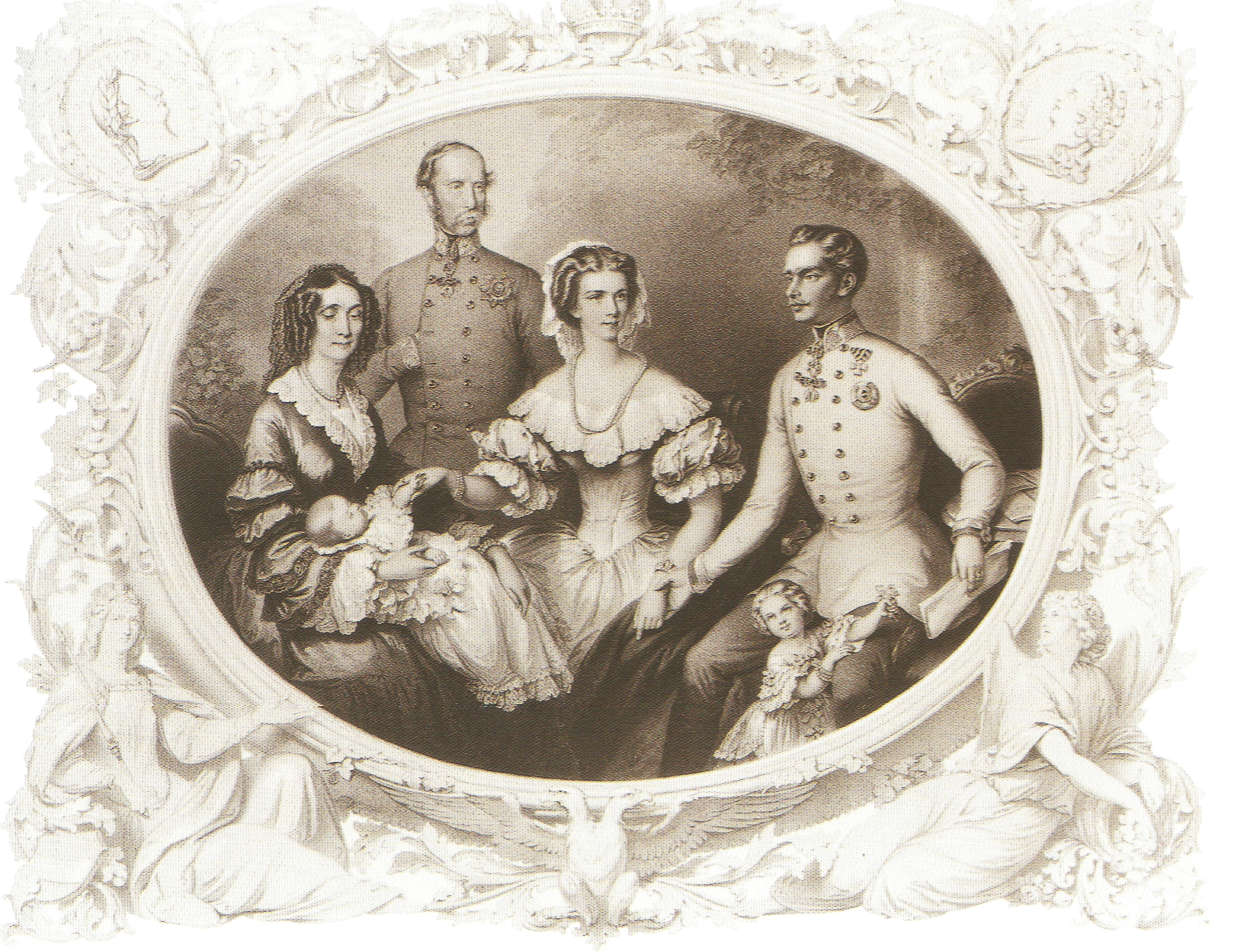
Franz Joseph, Sissi and their family soon after Gisela's birth. Lithograph by Kriehuber.

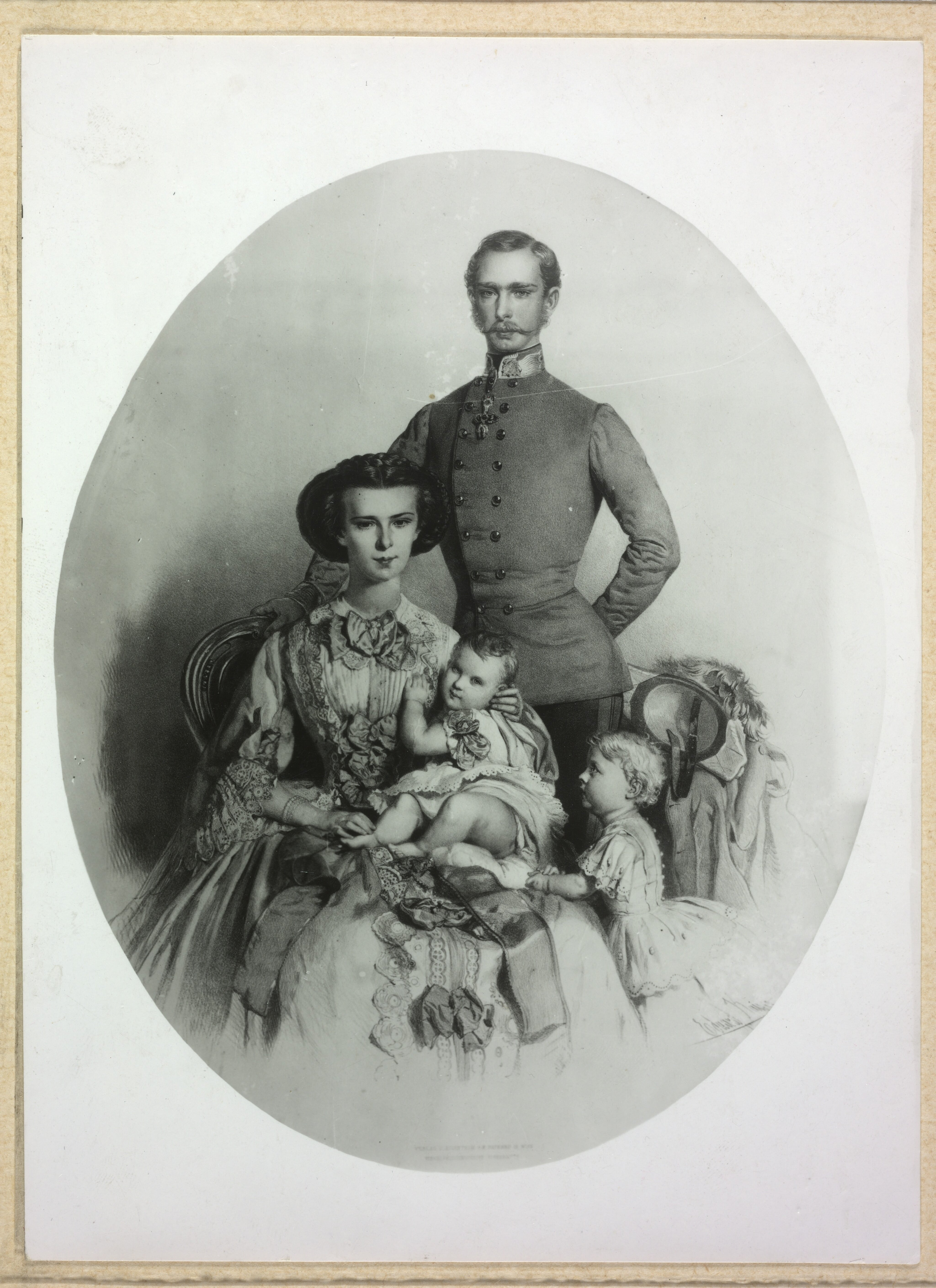
Sisi and Franz Joseph with their daughters in 1857, the year of Sophie's death. Lithograph by Kriehuber.

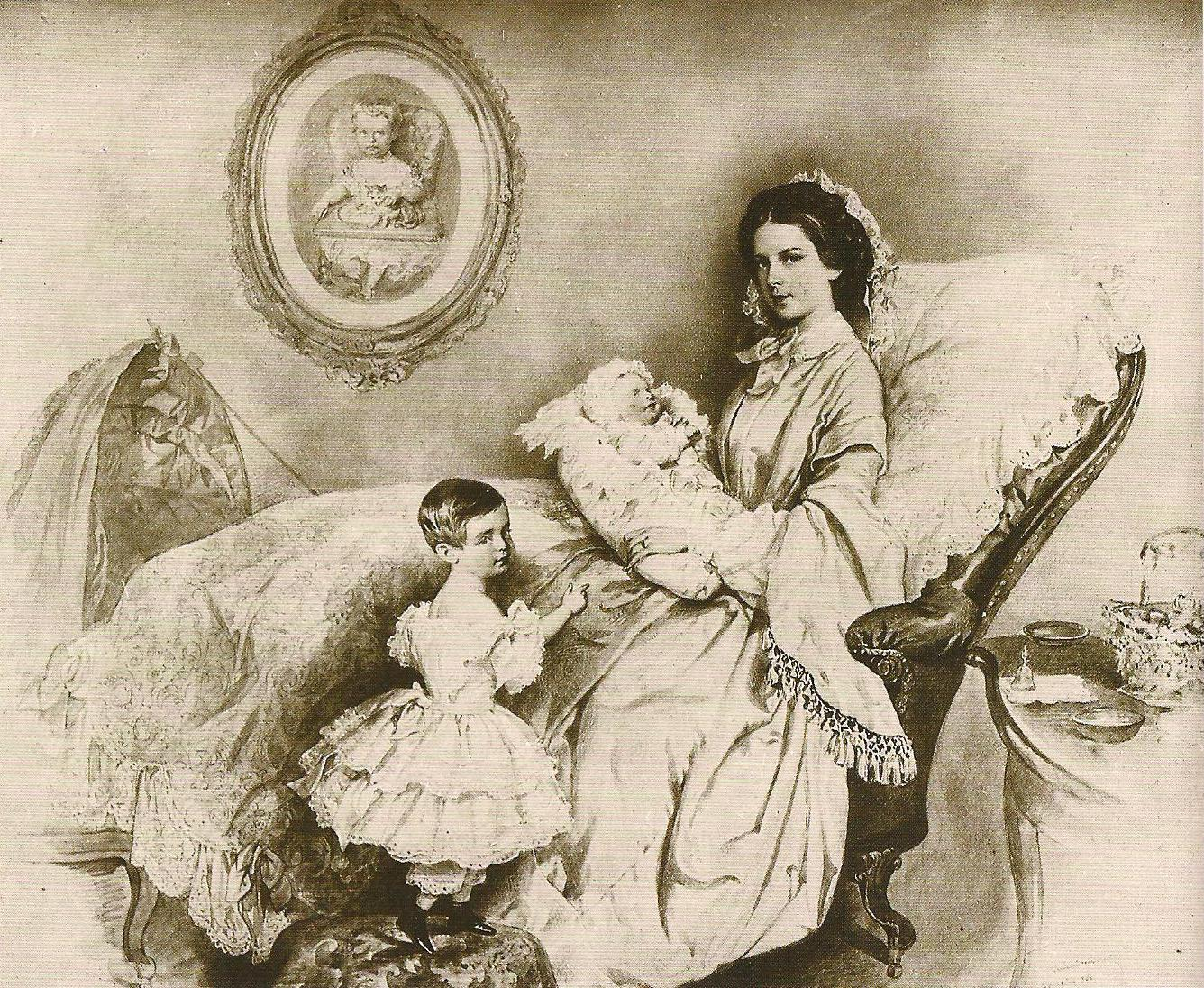
Lithograph by Kriehuber representing Sisi, Gisela and the newborn Crown Prince in 1858. Note the portrait of Sophie that is hanging on the wall.

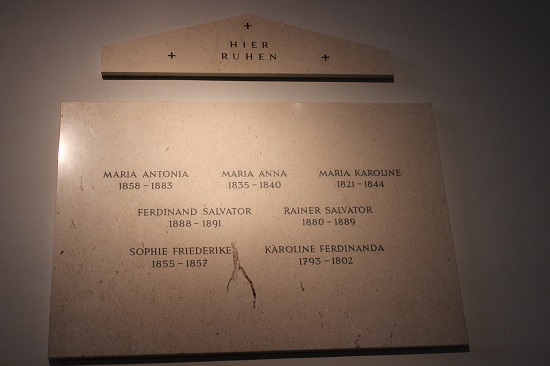
Grave of Archduchess Sophie of Austria

== Ancestry ==
Ancestors of Archduchess Sophie of Austria

8. Francis II, Holy Roman Emperor
4. Archduke Franz Karl of Austria
9. Princess Maria Theresa of Naples and Sicily
2. Franz Joseph I of Austria
10. Maximilian I Joseph of Bavaria
5. Princess Sophie of Bavaria
11. Princess Caroline of Baden
1. Archduchess Sophie of Austria
12. Duke Pius August in Bavaria
6. Duke Maximilian Joseph in Bavaria
13. Princess Amélie Louise of Arenberg
3. Duchess Elisabeth in Bavaria
14. Maximilian I Joseph of Bavaria
7. Princess Ludovika of Bavaria
15. Princess Caroline of Baden

== Bibliography ==
- Hotbauer, Renate (1998). Empress Elisabeth of Austria: The fate of a woman under the yoke of the Imperial Court. Vienna: Austria Imperial. p. 128. ISBN 3-902196-01-7.
