= The Woman of My Dreams (2010 film) =

The Woman Of My Dreams
- Film poster
- Directed by: Luca Lucini
- Screenplay by: Giulia Calenda; Teresa Ciabatti
- Story by: Cristina Comencini
- Starring: Alessandro Gassmann; Luca Argentero; Valentina Lodovini; Stefania Sandrelli
- Cinematography: Alessandro Bolzoni
- Edited by: Fabrizio Rossetti
- Music by: Carmelo Travia; Giuliano Taviani
- Production company: Cattleya
- Distributed by: Universal Pictures International
- Release date: 26 November 2010
- Country: Italy
- Language: Italian

The Woman of My Dreams (Italian: La donna della mia vita, also known as The Woman of My Life) is a 2010 Italian comedy-drama film directed by Luca Lucini and starring Alessandro Gassmann, Luca Argentero, Stefania Sandrelli, and Valentina Lodovini.

== Plot ==
Leonardo and Giorgio are two brothers with very different characters. Leonardo is sensitive and reliable, while Giorgio is an unstable womanizer. After a suicide attempt, Leonardo meets Sara, not knowing that she is Giorgio's ex, and in time they fall in love.

With difficulty, and only after the involvement of Giorgio's mother Alba, they restore their friendship.

== Cast ==
- Alessandro Gassman as Giorgio
- Luca Argentero as Leonardo
- Valentina Lodovini as Sara
- Stefania Sandrelli as Alba
- Giorgio Colangeli as Sandro
- Sonia Bergamasco as Carolina
- Gaia Bermani Amaral as Irene
- Lella Costa as Alba's friend
- Franco Branciaroli as Alberto
- Francesca Chillemi as herself

== See also ==
- List of Italian films of 2010
