= Ida Ferenczy =

Hungarian noblewoman (1839–1928)

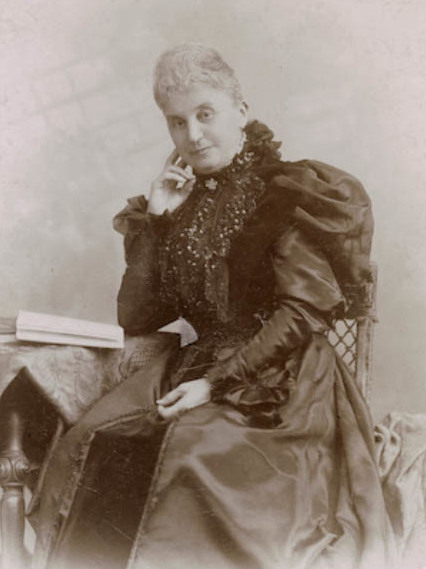
- Ferenczy c. 1898
- Full name: Vecseszéki Ferenczy Ida Krisztina Veronika
- Born: 7 April 1839; Kecskemét, Kingdom of Hungary
- Died: 28 June 1928 (aged 89); Vienna, First Austrian Republic
- Father: Gergely Ferenczy de Vecseszék
- Mother: Krisztina Szeless de Kisjácz

Coat of arms of the Ferenczy family

Ida Krisztina Veronika Ferenczy de Vecseszék (7 April 1839 – 28 June 1928) was a Hungarian noblewoman who served Empress Elisabeth of Austria as a lady-in-waiting—and favourite and confidant—from 1864 until the Empress' death in 1898.

== Life ==
=== Ancestry and early life ===
Ida Krisztina Veronika Ferenczy of Vecseszék was born into an old family of Hungarian landed gentry in Kecskemét as the fourth of six children born to Gergely Ferenczy de Vecseszék (1795-1879) and his wife, Krisztina Szeless de Kisjácz (1809-1856). The education she received was similar to that of most noble women in the Hungarian countryside at the time: she learned to read and write and spoke German very well. However, Ferenczy continued learning as an autodidact. Her taste in literature was influenced by writer Ida Miticzky, who moved to Kecskemét in 1862, with whom she also practiced reading out loud in an expressive manner.

=== Serving the Empress of Austria in Vienna ===
Empress Elisabeth of Austria, who was also the Queen of Hungary, was enthusiastic about Hungary from an early age, which led to her decision to start learning Hungarian in 1863 and surround herself with Hungarian ladies-in-waiting. She was presented with a list of suitable women, with the name of Ida Ferenczy at the bottom of the page in a different handwriting. It is unclear how and why a woman from the lower nobility was added to the list, but the Empress chose her.

The two women immediately developed a liking to each other at their first meeting: the Empress was impressed by the natural, open behavior and sincerity of her new companion and Ferenczy found her employer to be charming, intelligent and beautiful. Soon, they became friends and the Empress, who often felt lonely in the Austrian court, confided in her, using Hungarian almost as a secret language. The Empress even used the informal you (te) of the Hungarian language when addressing Ferenczy, something she otherwise only did when talking to her closest family.

Ferenczy belonged to a group of "appartementmäßigen Damen", who were allowed access to the Empress' private living quarters at all times, but she was not allowed to accompany her on her official engagements as the Ferenczy family was of the lower nobility. Any time they were apart, they exchanged long, warm letters.

After her journey to Hungary in 1866, the Empress started personally corresponding with Hungarian politicians who were, to varying degrees, opposed to the rule or methods of her husband, Emperor Franz Joseph I, using Ferenczy's help and mediation, including Count Gyula Andrássy, who was hanged in effigy for his participation in the Hungarian Revolution of 1848 and had never petitioned for amnesty and Ferenc Deák, the leader of the Passive Resistance movement following the defeat of the revolution.

Ferenczy herself corresponded with politician and journalist Miksa Falk (the Empress' first Hungarian teacher), historian and politician Lajos Thallóczy and Countess Antónia Zichy, the widow of Count Lajos Battyhány, the executed first Prime Minister of Hungary. She also developed a close friendship with Countesses Marie Festetics von Tolna and Irma Sztáray de Sztára et Nagymihály, the two other Hungarian ladies-in-waiting, Baron Franz Nopcsa, the majordomo of the Empress' household and Jácint Rónay, a titular bishop who oversaw the education of the Empress' two younger children.

Ferenczy accompanied the Empress on her extensive travels, teaching her Hungarian and reading to her aloud in the language, which was her main job. After she had proven to be an absolutely loyal and discreet friend, she was given various responsibilities around the Empress and sometimes even rather delicate tasks, such as arranging an anonymous rendezvous between the Empress and Friedrich List Pacher von Theinburg at a masquearade ball, or letting in actress Katharina Schratt, the Emperor's confidante and close friend to the monarch through her own room in the Hofburg. For the former service, the Emperor himself was thankful to Ferenczy, exchanging letters with her and gifting her a portrait of the Empress.

In 1890, Ferenczy was admitted to the Order of the Starry Cross, a highly respected dynastic order for Catholic noble ladies at the request of the Empress, thus being elevated to a rank similar to that of the most noble, aristocratic ladies of the Austro-Hungarian Empire.

=== Late life ===
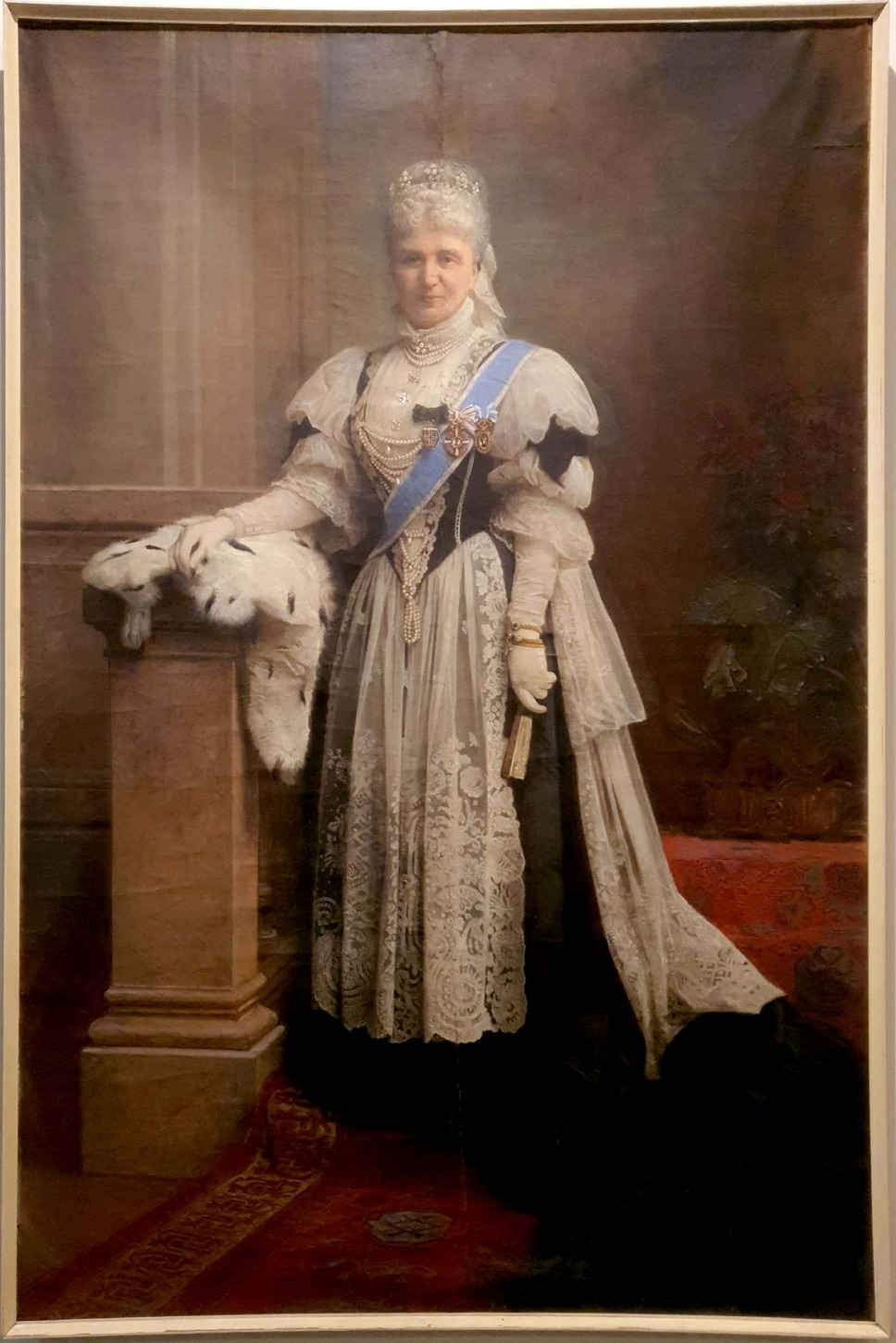
Ida Ferenczy in 1896, with the insignia of the Order of the Starry Cross and a fan, the symbol of ladies-in-waiting

Empress Elisabeth was assassinated in Geneva on 10 September 1898. Ferenczy was struck extremely hard by the tragedy, having spent almost forty years serving her and never marrying. Together with the Empress' youngest and favourite child, Archduchess Marie Valerie, she took care of her estate and took a large part of the Empress' writings with her when she left the court. She took up residency in Vienna, first on Reisnerstraße, then in the Schönbrunn district.

In 1899, she founded the Queen Elisabeth Memorial Museum in Budapest that opened in 1908. The museum was closed after the Second World War, but much of it had already been destroyed by that time.

She lived another thirty years after Empress Elisabeth's death and had to see the deaths of Baron Franz Nopcsa in 1904, Countess Marie Festetics in 1923 and Archduchess Marie Valerie in 1924, as well as the Austro-Hungarian Empire falling apart in the First World War and the Habsburg dynasty losing the throne and going into exile.

Ida Ferenczy died at the age of 89 on 28 June 1928 in Vienna and was buried in her place of birth, Kecskemét, in the family crypt of the Ferenczys at the Trinity cemetery.
