= Stefano Mordini =

Italian film director and screenwriter

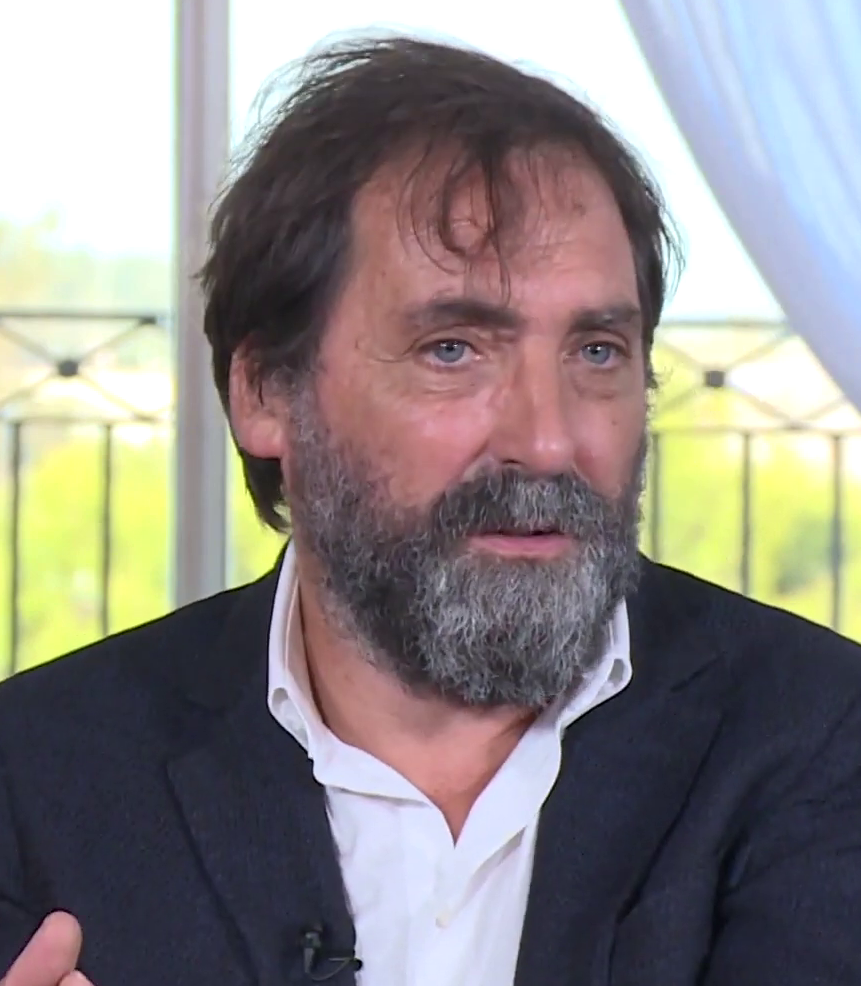
- Born: August 10, 1968 (age 57)
- Occupation(s): film director and screenwriter
- Spouse: Valentina Cervi
- Children: 2 (Margherita (2013) and a son (2016))

Stefano Mordini (born 10 August 1968) is an Italian film director and screenwriter.

He is married to actress Valentina Cervi with whom he has two children.

== Filmography ==
- Smalltown, Italy (2005)
- Steel (2012)
- Pericle (2016)
- The Invisible Witness (2018)
- The Players (2020)
- You Came Back (2020)
- The Catholic School (2021)
- Race for Glory: Audi vs. Lancia (2024)
