= Margins (film) =

2022 Italian comedy film

- Italian theatrical release poster by Zerocalcare
- Italian: Margini
- Directed by: Niccolò Falsetti
- Written by: Niccolò Falsetti; Tommaso Renzoni; Francesco Turbanti
- Produced by: Alessandro Amato; Luigi Giuseppe Chimienti; Manetti Bros.
- Starring: Francesco Turbanti; Emanuele Linfatti; Matteo Creatini
- Cinematography: Alessandro Veridiani
- Edited by: Stefano De Marco; Roberto Di Tanna
- Music by: Alessandro Pieravanti; Giancane
- Production companies: Dispàrte; Manetti Bros. Film; Rai Cinema
- Distributed by: Fandango
- Release dates: 2 September 2022 (Venice); 8 September 2022 (Italy)
- Running time: 91 minutes
- Country: Italy
- Language: Italian
- Box office: $217,705

Margins (Italian: Margini) is a 2022 Italian comedy film directed by Niccolò Falsetti.

Conceived by Falsetti and Francesco Turbanti, and written by them along with Tommaso Renzoni, the film tells the story of three young punk boys who try to organize a concert for a famous American band in their city.

The film premiered at the 37th International Critics' Week of the 79th Venice Film Festival, where it won the Prize of the Public, and was released in Italy on 8 September 2022.

The film received two nominations at the 68th David di Donatello Awards in the categories Best New Director for Niccolò Falsetti and Best Original Song for "La palude" by the Pegs. It also received three nominations at the Nastri d'Argento awards.

== Plot ==
Grosseto, 2008. Michele, Edoardo, and Iacopo are three friends who play in the street punk band Wait for Nothing, touring the province between local festivals and fairs. Michele, an unemployed skinhead, is married to Margherita, a supermarket cashier, and has a young daughter, Alice, with whom he loves to share his passion for music. Edoardo reluctantly works at the local disco Sala Eden, managed by his mother's partner, Adriano Melis. Iacopo, from a wealthy bourgeois family, studies the cello and is waiting for the call to play in Daniel Barenboim's French tour. The three have to deal with the monotony of provincial life and the perceived marginality of living in a city "two hours from everything."

Finally, they get the chance to play in Bologna, opening for a famous American punk band, The Defense, but due to an unforeseen event, the date is canceled. The three decide to contact The Defense to propose that they come to play in Grosseto, and unexpectedly, the proposal is accepted.

For the three guys, it’s time to get busy organizing the event, but difficulties soon arise: finding a venue that can host the concert is not easy, and it's equally difficult to obtain the equipment requested by the band at reasonable prices. They then seek the collaboration of the Municipality, which shows little interest and has already allocated all resources for cultural activities to a historical reenactment of Louis IV the Bavarian's siege. At his mother's urging, Edoardo reluctantly agrees to speak with Adriano Melis to organize the concert at Sala Eden, but the deal falls through after a quarrel between the three and the entrepreneur. Finally, they opt for a dilapidated community hall provided by the Municipality. Meanwhile, Michele not only misses a job interview arranged by Margherita, but secretly uses his wife's money to buy The Defense plane tickets to Italy. Iacopo receives the call from Barenboim for the start of the tour, which coincides with the concert date, and after revealing it to Edoardo, he doesn't know how to tell Michele.

With no more money and frayed nerves, the three decide to steal Adriano Melis' equipment by sneaking into Sala Eden at night, but end up vandalizing the place. Discovered, they are taken to the police station. Melis decides not to press charges for the time being, while Edoardo's mother kicks him out of the house, but not before giving him the necessary equipment for the concert. Iacopo tells Michele about his intention to leave Grosseto to pursue his orchestral career, and the three separate after yet another argument. Relations between Michele and Margherita are also at an all-time low after she discovers that her husband used her credit card without her knowledge. Iacopo leaves for the tour, while The Defense finally arrive in Grosseto for the concert, which takes place successfully with a large audience.

The next day, Michele and Edoardo are back at the police station: the front page of Il Tirreno reads, "Punk concert shocks the city. Two Grosseto residents reported." Despite everything, the two are satisfied with the success of their endeavor and call Iacopo to inform him, but his voicemail answers in French. As they drive through the streets of Grosseto, they sing Massimo Ranieri's "Se bruciasse la città" at the top of their lungs.

== Cast ==
- Francesco Turbanti as Michele
- Emanuele Linfatti as Edoardo
- Matteo Creatini as Iacopo
- Valentina Carnelutti as Tiziana
- Nicola Rignanese as Adriano Melis
- Paolo Cioni as Paolo Bassi
- Aurora Malianni as Alice
- Silvia D'Amico as Margherita
- Zerocalcare as himself (voice only)

== Production ==
=== Development ===
The idea for the film was born from the desire of director Niccolò Falsetti and actor Francesco Turbanti, friends since elementary school and founding members of the punk band Pegs, to make a film about the Italian hardcore scene. The first script was written in 2013, and the authors initially intended to make a film adaptation of Marco Philopat's book Costretti a sanguinare. However, due to the difficulties in recreating the atmosphere of the 1970s punk scene, the two authors decided to draw from their own autobiographical experiences, abandoning the initial idea to create a comedy set in Grosseto in the late 2000s. The plot of a provincial band trying to organize a concert by an international group in their town is inspired by a real event that occurred in 2007, when Falsetti and Turbanti managed to bring the American band Madball to perform at Roselle, on the outskirts of Grosseto.

=== Pre-production ===
The pre-production of the film began in 2015, when the project was supported by Alessandro Amato and Luigi Chimienti's Dispàrte, later joined by the Manetti Bros., with whom Falsetti had already worked as a camera operator on Inspector Coliandro. The script, rewritten several times by Falsetti and Turbanti, was finally completed and refined with the contribution of Tommaso Renzoni. The technical cast included Alessandro Veridiani for cinematography, Vito Giuseppe Zito for set design, and Ginevra De Carolis for costumes, with consulting from David Bardelli, a local "mentor" to the two authors during their punk formative years, upon whom the character of Michele is modeled. The roles of the three protagonists were entrusted to Turbanti himself, Emanuele Linfatti, and Matteo Creatini; to prepare for their characters, the authors gave the actors personalized playlists of punk hardcore music and asked them to watch several films, including This Is England and La Haine.

The film poster was created by cartoonist Zerocalcare, whom the two authors had met during their concerts with the Pegs and had met again at a comic festival at Forte Prenestino. Zerocalcare also created the poster for the Defense concert within the film and participated in a vocal cameo. Falsetti recalled that he had already contacted Zerocalcare to make a poster for a Pegs concert in the late 2000s, but had to refuse after the cartoonist asked for a forty-euro reimbursement. Zerocalcare commented: "In my past life I asked for some reimbursement from only three bands, one of them was you, the only ones who didn't give it to me. Then I stopped asking."

=== Filming ===
Filming took place in Grosseto starting on 19 April 2021, then moved to Abbadia San Salvatore from May 19 to 21, with the support of the Tuscany Film Commission. Locations included Piazza Dante, the railway station, the police headquarters, the Medici walls. The director stated that he deliberately minimized filming in the historic center to avoid the "postcard Tuscany" effect, focusing mainly on filming the working-class neighborhoods and outskirts, such as Alberino, Barbanella, Sugherella. The interiors of Sala Eden, an actual historic dance hall on the Garibaldi bastion, were filmed at Club 71 in Abbadia San Salvatore, a small venue that still retains the original 1970s dance floor; the real Sala Eden was used as the crew's logistical base for the entire duration of filming.

=== Post-production ===
The film is dedicated to the memory of Luigi "Gigi" Ambrosio, owner of the historic Caffè Ricasoli in Grosseto, who died on 17 September 2021, shortly after the end of filming. Ambrosio appears as himself in a scene in the film.

== Music ==
The film's music is entirely diegetic, meaning it is played or listened to by the characters within the film's narrative. The soundtrack features numerous punk bands from the Italian hardcore scene that supported the project, including Negazione, Klaxon, Colonna Infame Skinhead, Rappresaglia, La Crisi, Kina, Nabat, and Payback, who portray the Defense in the film, as well as the Pegs, the band that includes the film's creators. The music supervision was handled by Alessandro Pieravanti from Muro del Canto, with live music mixing by Giancane.

=== Soundtrack ===
Margini: I brani punk di un film di provincia

Soundtrack album by various artists
- Released: 8 September 2022
- Genre: punk
- Label: Centro Storico Lebowski
- Producer: Various

The soundtrack album, titled Margini: I brani punk di un film di provincia ("Margins: The Punk Tracks of a Film from the Province"), was released in physical format alongside the film's theatrical release, in collaboration with the Florentine association Centro Storico Lebowski.

The film also features other songs not included in the album, such as "Rock 'n' Roll Robot" by Alberto Camerini and "Se bruciasse la città" by Massimo Ranieri.

==== Track listing ====
No.	Title	Artist(s)	Length
1.	"La palude"	Pegs
2.	"Brucia di vita"	Negazione
3.	"È tutto loro quello che luccica"	Klaxon
4.	"O.P.N.D."	Anti You
5.	"Punk è moda"	Colonna Infame Skinhead
6.	"Ai margini"	Gli Ultimi
7.	"Die Hard"	Payback
8.	"Attack!"	Rappresaglia
9.	"Ancora qui"	Pegs
10.	"I Wrote I Hate You on the Sand"	Coloss
11.	"Scarred for Life"	Payback
12.	"Kings of Nothing"	Payback
13.	"Mi credi o no?"	La Crisi
14.	"Questi anni"	Kina
15.	"L'Italia degli sfruttati"	Nabat
16.	"Notte nera"	Gli Ultimi

== Marketing ==
A promotional clip for the film was released on YouTube on 30 July 2022, while the official trailer was released on MyMovies' channel on 5 September. The comic artist Zerocalcare, who designed the poster, published a three-page comic on his social media profiles in support of the film. Additionally, he supervised a project of ten promotional postcards illustrated by various independent Italian comic artists: LRNZ, Simone Lucciola, Mad Kime, Marco About, Mayo, Nova, Rise Above, Serena Schinaia, Silvia Sicks, and Tommy Gun.

On 8 September 2022, the date of the film's theatrical release, the Margini Fest concert was organized at Parco Schuster in Rome, featuring performances by the Pegs, along with Klaxon, Gli Ultimi, No More Lies, and Iena. Additional Margini Fest events were later held in Grosseto, Milan, and Genoa, with the Pegs joined by various bands from the Italian hardcore scene. The Margini Fest in Grosseto took place on 10 September at Sala Eden, a location used for filming and featured in the film.

== Reception ==
=== Accolades ===
Awards and nominations received by Margins
Award	Date of ceremony	Category	Recipient(s)	Result	Ref.
Venice International Critics' Week	2-9 September 2022	Best Film	Margins	Nominated	
Venice International Critics' Week	2-9 September 2022	Prize of the Public	Margins	Won	
David di Donatello	10 May 2023	Best New Director	Niccolò Falsetti	Nominated	
David di Donatello	10 May 2023	Best Original Song	"La palude" (Niccolò Falsetti, Giacomo Pieri, Alessio Ricciotti, Francesco Turbanti, Emanuele Linfatti, Matteo Creatini)	Nominated	
Nastro d'Argento	20 June 2023	Best New Director	Niccolò Falsetti	Nominated	
Nastro d'Argento	20 June 2023	Best Comedy Actor	Nicola Rignanese	Nominated	
Nastro d'Argento	20 June 2023	Best Original Song	"La palude" (Falsetti, Pieri, Ricciotti, Turbanti, Linfatti, Creatini)	Nominated	
Bobbio Film Festival	6 August 2023	Best Film	Margins	Won	
