= Matteo Creatini =

Italian actor (born 1995)

- Born: 25 November 1995 (age 29); Florence, Italy
- Occupation(s): Actor, singer-songwriter, rapper
- Years active: 2014–present

Matteo Creatini (born 25 November 1995), also known as Matteo Crea, is an Italian actor, singer-songwriter and rapper.

== Career ==
Matteo Creatini was born on 25 November 1995, in Florence, but grew up in Rosignano Solvay, in the province of Livorno. He started writing songs and playing the guitar from a young age and made his film debut at eleven in Paolo Virzì's Napoleon and Me in 2006.

In 2014, he played the lead role of Edo in Short Skin, a film centered on the struggles of a young man with phimosis.

In the same year, he made his debut as a singer with the EP Always C.R.E.A.M., in collaboration with the Milanese group Always Fresh Motherfucker. The following year, he released MxM under the name Crema. He later changed his musical project name to CreMa dé Sodaboy, releasing the EPs Sodaboy (2016) and Ce l'ho fatta vol. 1 (2017), and then to Sodaboi, under which he released the EP Problemi in 2018.

In 2019, he appeared in Emilia Mazzacurati's short film Manica a vento. In 2022, he played Iacopo, one of the three protagonists in the film Margins, directed by Niccolò Falsetti. The film earned him a nomination for the David di Donatello for Best Original Song and the Nastro d'Argento for Best Original Song for the track "La palude".

That same year, he performed at Firenze Rocks as the opening act for Green Day, and released an album titled Io non sono mai felice, under the name Matteo Crea. Additionally, his single "A casa dei miei" was featured by Apple Music in the Up Next Italia program, with a performance in Piazza del Liberty in Milan.

== Filmography ==
Film
Year	Title	Role	Notes
2006	Napoleon and Me	Bruno	Film debut
2014	Short Skin	Edoardo	Lead role
2019	Manica a vento	Boy in the elevator	Short film
2022	Margins	Iacopo	Lead role

== Discography ==
Studio albums

- Io non sono mai felice (BMG, 2022)

EPs

- Always C.R.E.A.M. (2014) with Always Fresh Motherfuckers
- MXM (2015) as Crema
- Sodaboy (2016) as CreMa dé Sodaboy
- Ce l'ho fatta vol. 1 (2017) as CreMa dé Sodaboy
- Problemi (2018) as Sodaboi
