= Dall'Orto =

Dall'Orto is an Italian surname. Notable people with the surname include:

- Antonio Campo Dall'Orto (born 1964), Italian company manager
- Gea Dall'Orto (born 2002), Italian actress
