= Motivé-e-s =

Motivé-e-s (also called Les Motivés!) is a leftist band and French political movement created in Toulouse by members of the music group Zebda.

== History ==
Motivé-e-s secured 12.49% of the votes in the municipal elections of March 2001 in Toulouse after a media campaign focusing on participatory democracy. The group employed four municipal councilors: Isabelle Riviere, Michel Desmars, Salah Amokrane, and Elisabeth Heysch de la Borde.

Motivé-e-s denounced the choice of their former member, Magyd Cherfi, to support the Socialist Party candidate, Pierre Cohen, in an open letter entitled "Magyd, your choice is not ours".

In the 2008 municipal elections in Toulouse, Motivé-e-s chose not to participate in the unitary list led by the Anticapitalist Left of Myriam Martin, as they wanted to create left unity, while bringing their seven years of experience to the municipal council.

== Discography ==
Chants de lutte

No.	Title	Music	Length
1.	"Motivés, le chant des partisans"	Magyd Cherfi, Hakim et Mustapha Amokrane	4:22
2.	"El paso del Ebro"	Magyd Cherfi, Hakim et Mustapha Amokrane, Céline Amokrane-Chesnel	1:57
3.	"Hasta Siempre"	Magyd Cherfi, Hakim et Mustapha Amokrane, Celine Amokrane-Chesnel	4:30
4.	"Nekwni S Warrach N Lezzayer"	Magyd Cherfi	4:21
5.	"Bella Ciao"	Jean luc Amestoy, Rémi Mouilléras, Magyd Cherfi, Hakim et Mustapha Amokrane, Céline Amokrane-Chesnel, Laure Madaule-Grellety	2:13
6.	"La butte rouge"	Magyd Cherfi, Hakim et Mustapha Amokrane	3:43
7.	"La Cucaracha"	Hakim et Mustapha Amokrane	3:25
8.	"Bandiera Rossa"	Magyd Cherfi, Hakim et Mustapha Amokrane	2:34
9.	"Le temps des cerises"	Laure Madaule-Grellety	3:47
10.	"Nicaraguita"	Philippe Dutheil	3:49
11.	"L'Estaca"	Philippe Dutheil, Marc Dechaumont et François Bombaglia	6:20
Total length:			39:03

Motivés ! Y'a toujours pas d'arrangement !

No.	Title	Music	Length
1.	"Motivés, le chant des partisans"	Magyd Cherfi, Hakim et Mustapha Amokrane	4:22
2.	"El paso del Ebro"	Magyd Cherfi, Hakim et Mustapha Amokrane, Céline Amokrane-Chesnel	1:57
3.	"Hasta Siempre"	Magyd Cherfi, Hakim et Mustapha Amokrane, Celine Amokrane-Chesnel	4:30
4.	"Nekwni S Warrach N Lezzayer"	Magyd Cherfi	4:21
5.	"Bella Ciao"	Jean luc Amestoy, Rémi Mouilléras, Magyd Cherfi, Hakim et Mustapha Amokrane, Céline Amokrane-Chesnel, Laure Madaule-Grellety	2:13
6.	"La butte rouge"	Magyd Cherfi, Hakim et Mustapha Amokrane	3:43
7.	"La Cucaracha"	Hakim et Mustapha Amokrane	3:25
8.	"Bandiera Rossa"	Magyd Cherfi, Hakim et Mustapha Amokrane	2:34
9.	"Le temps des cerises"	Laure Madaule-Grellety	3:47
10.	"Nicaraguita"	Philippe Dutheil	3:49
11.	"L'Estaca"	Philippe Dutheil, Marc Dechaumont et François Bombaglia	6:20
12.	"A la luta Continua"		5:20
13.	"L'Âge d'or"		3:21
14.	"Police on My Back"		2:51
15.	"Sabra ou Chatila (El Majzara)"		4:57
16.	"Motivés 2017"		3:42
Total length:			1:01:12

=== Other works ===
- "Motivés, le chant des partisans" is depicted in the 2011 graphic novel The Armadillo Prophecy by Italian author Zerocalcare and its 2018 film adaptation.
- 2018: Soundtrack for the film I Feel Good by Benoît Delépine and Gustave Kervern.

== Artists ==
- Magyd Cherfi (Zebda)
- Hakim et Mustapha Amokrane (Zebda)
- Philippe Dutheil
- Jean Luc Amestoy
- Rémi Mouillérac
- Céline Amokrane-Chesnel
- Marc Dechaumont
- Anne-Laure Madaule-Grellety
- François Bombaglia
