= Three Days Later =

- Italian theatrical release poster
- Italian: Tre giorni dopo
- Directed by: Daniele Grassetti
- Written by: Matteo Berdini; Daniele Grassetti; Chiara Laudani; Enrico Saccà; Fabrizio Vecchi
- Produced by: Daniele Mazzocca
- Starring: Francesco Turbanti; Davide Gagliardi; Emanuele Propizio; Valentino Campitelli; Aylin Prandi; Sergio Albelli; Giorgio Colangeli; Raffaele Vannoli; Marco Conidi; Romano Talevi
- Cinematography: Michele Paradisi
- Edited by: Roberto Missiroli
- Music by: Maurizio Filardo
- Release dates: 26 July 2013 (Giffoni Film Festival); 1 June 2016 (Italy)
- Running time: 80 minutes
- Country: Italy
- Language: Italian

Three Days Later (Italian: Tre giorni dopo) is a 2013 Italian black comedy film directed by Daniele Grassetti.

The film premiered at the Giffoni Film Festival on 26 July 2013 and was theatrically released on 1 June 2016.

== Cast ==
- Francesco Turbanti as Matteo
- Davide Gagliardi as Sandro
- Valentino Campitelli as Nicola
- Aylin Prandi as Olimpia
- Emanuele Propizio as Pistacchietto
- Sergio Albelli as Father Moreno
- Giorgio Colangeli as Dottor Carlo
- Raffaele Vannoli as Pietro il Bello
- Marco Conidi as Alessio
- Romano Talevi as Riccardino
- Livio Beshir as Leao
- Tatiana Farnese as Marisa
- Lydia Biondi as Matteo's grandma
- Daniele Miglio as Sergio
