= Simon Ward (singer) =

Canadian singer and musician (born 1983)

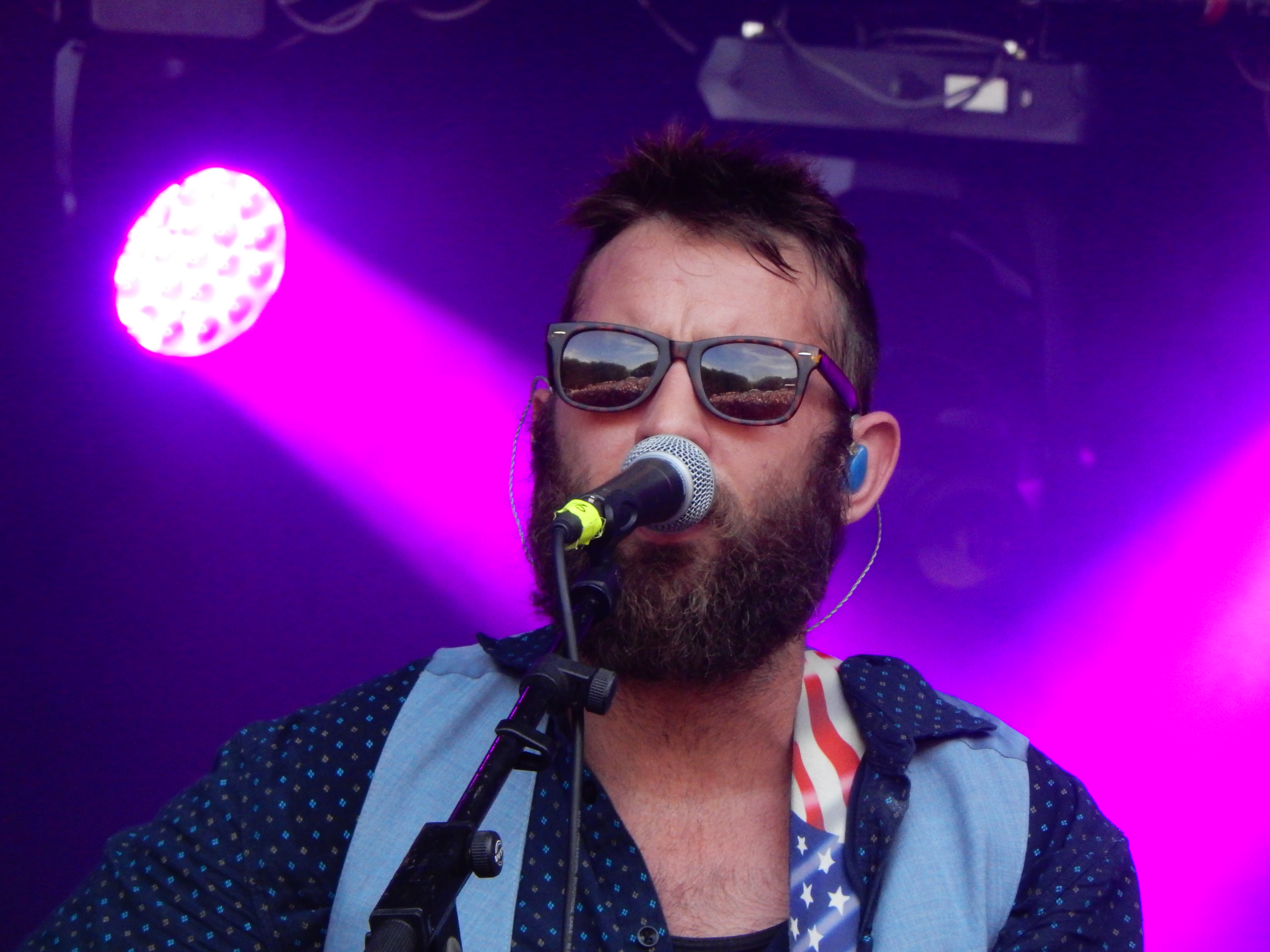
- Ward during a concert in 2016

Background information
- Born: December 27, 1983 (age 42)
- Years active: 2008–present
- Member of: Soup
- Formerly of: The Strumbellas
- Website: www.simonwardmusic.com

Simon Ward (born December 27, 1983) is a Canadian singer and musician best known as a founding member and the former frontman of The Strumbellas. In 2022, he announced his decision to stop singing with the group, though he is still involved with its songwriting.

== Career ==
Ward founded The Strumbellas in 2008 in Toronto, Canada. He found most of the members on Craiglist.

The band has released five albums: My Father and the Hunter, We Still Move on Dance Floors, Hope, Rattlesnake, and Part Time Believer. However, for the last album, he no longer served as lead singer.

In March 2022, the band announced on Instagram that Ward had transitioned into a behind-the-scenes role to focus on his family and songwriting. Jimmy Chauveau replaced Ward as the band's vocalist.

Since his departure from the group, Ward has started to focus more on writing. Subsequently, he joined the grunge group Soup. The band subsequently released two singles, "Let's Go For A Ride" and "Kids".

In 2022, he sang the songs "Love We Lost" and "Hey (I Miss You)" by Dutch artist Armin van Buuren, which also featured disc jockey R3hab. He has also collaborated with artists such as Deepend, Skytech, UNKLFNKL, and Fedde Le Grand.

== Discography ==
=== with The Strumbellas ===
==== Studio albums ====
- My Father and the Hunter (2012)
- We Still Move on Dance Floors (2013)
- Hope (2016)
- Rattlesnakes (2019)

==== EPs ====
- The Strumbellas (2009)

==== Singles ====
- "Spirits" (2016)
- "We Don't Know" (2016)
- "Young & Wild" (2017)
- "Salvation" (2018)
- "I Will Wait" (2019)
- "Greatest Enemy" (2021)

=== As Simon Ward ===
- Simon and the Island (2021)

=== With Soup ===
==== Singles ====
- "Let's Go For A Ride" (2024)
- "Kids" (2024)
