= The Invisible Player =

- Italian: Il giocatore invisibile
- Directed by: Stefano Alpini
- Written by: Giuseppe Pontiggia (story)
- Produced by: Stefano Alpini; Maria Elena Bianchi Bandinelli; Francesco Monceri
- Starring: Luca Lionello
- Cinematography: Antonio De Rosa
- Edited by: Marco Guelfi
- Music by: Manfred Giampietro
- Release dates: 16 April 2016 (Houston); 7 December 2017 (Italy)
- Running time: 92 minutes
- Country: Italy
- Language: Italian

The Invisible Player (Italian: Il giocatore invisibile) is a 2016 Italian drama film directed by Stefano Alpini.

The film is a loose adaptation of the novel of the same name by Giuseppe Pontiggia and is set in the city of Pisa. It premiered at WorldFest-Houston Film Festival on 16 April 2016 and was released in Italy on 17 December 2017.

== Cast ==
- Luca Lionello as Prof. Stefano Nari
- Sergio Albelli as Prof. Matteo Daverio
- Guenda Goria as Anna Nari
- Francesco Turbanti as Lorenzo
- Ludovica Bizzaglia as Olivia
- Lorenzo Alessandri as Prof. Gregorio Salutati
- Luciana Cipriani as Luisa Daverio
- David Riondino as Prof. Liverani
- Paolo Benvenuti as Prof. Martelli
