= Tear Along the Dotted Line =

Italian television series

- Strappare lungo i bordi
- Genre: Adult animation; Comedy drama
- Created by: Zerocalcare
- Written by: Zerocalcare
- Directed by: Zerocalcare
- Creative director: Erika De Nicola
- Voices of: Zerocalcare; Valerio Mastandrea
- Opening theme: "Strappati lungo i bordi"
- Composer: Giancane
- Country of origin: Italy
- Original languages: Italian; Romanesco
- No. of seasons: 1
- No. of episodes: 6

Production
- Executive producers: Michele Foschini; (BAO Publishing); Francesca Ettorre; (Movimenti Production); Magali Fuzellier; (Movimenti Production); Giovanna Bo; (DogHead Animation Studio)
- Producers: Davide Rosio; Giorgio Scorza
- Running time: 16-22 minutes
- Production companies: Movimenti Production; BAO Publishing; DogHead Animation Studio

Original release
- Network: Netflix
- Release: 19 November 2021

Related
- This World Can't Tear Me Down; My 2 Cents

Tear Along the Dotted Line (Italian: Strappare lungo i bordi) is an Italian adult animated comedy drama television series written and directed by Italian cartoonist Zerocalcare. It follows Zero, a fictionalized version of Zerocalcare, who reflects on his path in life and a would-be love as he travels outside Rome with his friends Secco and Sara and his armadillo-for-a-conscience. The series is inspired by actual experiences lived by Zerocalcare, who voices most of the characters in the original version. It was released internationally on Netflix on 17 November 2021 to generally positive reviews from critics.

A second series featuring the same characters, titled This World Can't Tear Me Down, was released on 9 June 2023. A third series featuring the same characters, titled My 2 Cents was released on 27 May 2026.

== Plot ==
The series follows Zero, an anxious and socially awkward cartoonist from Rome who reflects on his path in life and a would-be love as he travels to the city of Biella with his friends Sarah and Secco and his armadillo-for-a-conscience. In the initial episodes, Zero imitates the voices of his friends since he himself acts as the narrator and plays all the main roles. Initially Sarah and Zero meet in a seemingly casual way, and as they progress, Zero begins to remember different episodes of his life and his personal relationships with his close friends, especially Alice, on whom he had a crush when he was younger. However, they ultimately never began a romantic relationship with each other, instead maintaining a true friendship. Zero and Sarah reunite with Secco to decide how they will travel to Biella. Once they arrive at their destination, they are greeted by a couple of elders who host them in their home. The trio make it clear that they are not entirely comfortable with the situation, but agreed to come to Biella partly out of a need to save money, and partly as a courtesy to the elderly couple, who are revealed to be Alice's parents. At the end of the fifth episode, Secco finally reveals that Alice has died and they are attending her funeral.

The final episode is the only one in which each character speaks with their real voice, since the events are now happening in real time. Zero realizes that Alice also had a crush on him, but their relationship never moved beyond friendship. Alice's parents, Sarah, and Zero reflect on what could have motivated a lively and optimistic person like Alice to commit suicide for no clear reason and invite the public to pay more attention to the people around them.

== Cast ==
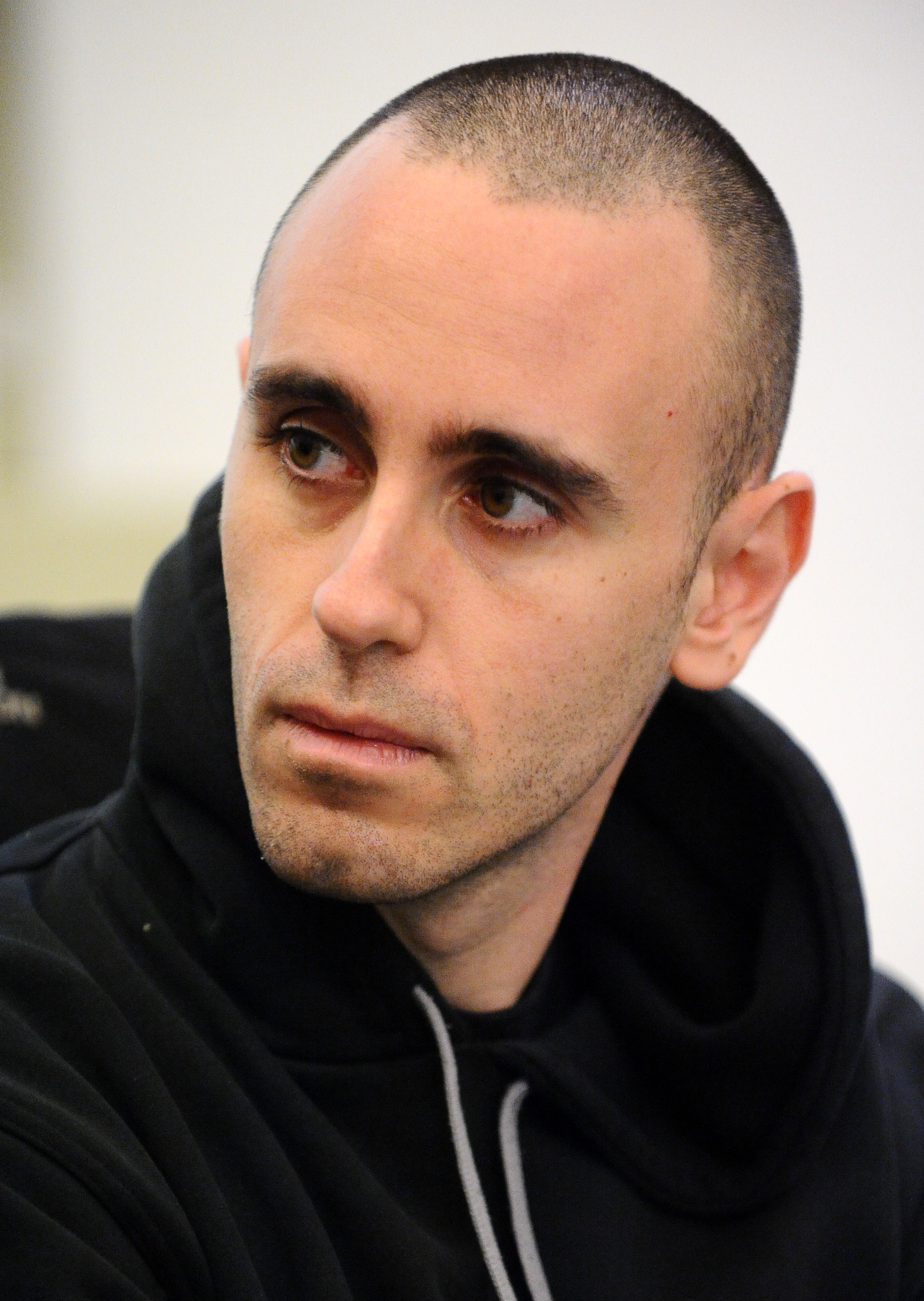
Zerocalcare, the show's creator and voice of many characters in the original Italian version

- Zerocalcare as himself, nicknamed "Zero." He also dubs all other voices in the first 5 episodes, except Armadillo. He often breaks the fourth wall, directly addressing the audience, interrupting his own flashbacks to clarify or justify his own mistakes.
- Valerio Mastandrea as Armadillo, a giant orange creature that only exists in Zero's mind. He acts as his conscience and criticizes almost everything Zero does.
- Chiara Gioncardi as Sarah (episode 6), Zero's best friend since primary school. She dreams of becoming a teacher.
- Paolo Vivio as Secco (episode 6), Zero's close friend who dropped out of school to become an online poker player. He is deadpan compared to Zero and Sarah and is seemingly indifferent to the world; however, he has a passion for ice cream, as he suggests going to get some at every opportunity.
- Veronica Puccio as Alice (episode 6), Sarah's friend and Zero's crush. A girl who moved to Rome to pursue her dreams of becoming a child educator.
- Ambrogio Colombo as Alice's father (episode 6)
- Michele Foschini as Guy (episode 6)
- Ezio Conenna and Alessandra Sani as additional voices (episode 6)

English cast:

- Adam Rhys Dee as Zerocalcare. Like Zerocalcare in the Italian version, he dubs the voices of every character besides Armadillo in the first 5 episodes.
- Wayne Forester as Armadillo
- Becky Wright, Ben Elliot, Robert Wilfort as additional voices

== Production ==
On 21 December 2020, Zerocalcare announced that he would be creating an animated series for Netflix titled Tear Along the Dotted Line, his first animated series after having experimented with animation for years. The series is produced by Movimenti Production (A Banijay company) in collaboration with BAO Publishing, DogHead Animation is charged for the animation production while Massimo Cherubin from Rain Frog is sound designer and mixer. Ten months later, on 8 October 2021, Netflix released a teaser trailer for the show. The show premiered on 18 October at the Rome Film Festival and was internationally released via Netflix on 17 November.

== Episodes ==
No.	Title	Directed by	Written by	Original release date
1	"The Bacterial Steppe of Pluto"	Zerocalcare	Zerocalcare	17 November 2021
Zero introduces himself and his close friends, and begins to remember his relationship with Alice in a series of flashbacks.
2	"Like a blade of grass"	Zerocalcare	Zerocalcare	17 November 2021
Sarah and Zero meet at the park and head to a coffee shop for breakfast while reviewing important events from their childhood.
3	"Working construction is worse"	Zerocalcare	Zerocalcare	17 November 2021
Zero and Sarah head to Secco's apartment to reunite with him and begin traveling to Biella. Zero recaps his nightmarish experience of tutoring kids, including a lizard boy he unknowingly made into a nazi and an inseparable pair of mischievous mouse girls named Valentina and Ludovica.
4	"Broken Compasses"	Zerocalcare	Zerocalcare	17 November 2021
On their way to the train station, Zero gives some hindsight on his relationship with his closest friends along with Alice's troubled love life.
5	"Don't Ask, Don't Tell"	Zerocalcare	Zerocalcare	17 November 2021
On the train, Zero remembers the last time he saw Alice along with the realization that he wasted his life when encountering a more mature and successful Valentina. Zero and his friends soon arrive at the home of Alice's parents and spent the night before attending their friend's funeral.
6	"Catharsis"	Zerocalcare	Zerocalcare	17 November 2021
At Alice's funeral, Zero struggles with how to grieve as Sarah blasts him for making this more about himself than their friend. Alice's parents conclude the funeral with a remembrance of their daughter's life.

== Soundtrack ==
The original soundtrack was composed by Giancane and collected in the album Strappati lungo i bordi, released along with the series. Other tracks were chosen by Zerocalcare, including tracks by Billy Idol, Jonathan Lloyd & Clif Norrell, Manu Chao, Band of Horses, Ron, Tiziano Ferro, M83, Max Brodie, Fauve, Gli Ultimi, Klaxon, and Generation X.

== Legacy ==
In May 2022, BAO Publishing announced on their Instagram account the current production of a new animated Netflix series, titled This World Can't Tear Me Down, featuring the same staff. The series was released on 9 June 2023. A third Netflix series My 2 Cents was released on May 27, 2026.

== Controversy ==
Turkish newspaper Sabah wrote an article about the series having the People Defense Units flag in the trailer, as well as flags of the Kurdistan Workers Party displayed in an episode.

== See also ==
- Zerocalcare
- The Armadillo Prophecy
- Kobane Calling
- This World Can't Tear Me Down
- List of Italian television series
