= Spirits (The Strumbellas song) =

Single by the Strumbellas

from the album Hope
- Released: January 28, 2016
- Genre: Folk rock; indie rock
- Length: 3:24
- Label: Glassnote
- Songwriters: Jeremy Drury; Jon Hembrey; Darryl James; Izzy Ritchie; David Ritter; Simon Ward
- Producer: Dave Schiffman

The Strumbellas singles chronology
"Spirits" (2016)	"We Don't Know" (2016)

"Spirits" is a song by Canadian indie folk band the Strumbellas. It was produced by Dave Schiffman and was released as the debut single from the band's third album, Hope, in 2016.

== Music video ==
The official music video was released on January 28, 2016. It depicts the band performing the song at a funeral where all the mourners are wearing masks and costumes. During the procession, it becomes a lively parade based on a jazz funeral.

== In popular culture ==
The song was used in the film Middle School: The Worst Years of My Life in 2016.

The song was featured in the trailer for the 2018 film Midnight Sun, starring Bella Thorne and Patrick Schwarzenegger.

In 2020, the song went viral on TikTok, with a slowed down version, and a remix version made by DragoKG. It has been in more than 289.7K videos on TikTok as of March 23, 2021.

As a result of the viral popularity of "Spirits" on TikTok, on September 10, 2020, the band re-released an official lyric video to the song more than five years since it was released to YouTube, which received more than 837K views as of March 23, 2022. A bittersweet nostalgia themed clip comparing then and now footage of famous celebrities has been used on social media websites using this song.

In January 2023, "Spirits" was used in the Apple TV+ series Shrinking in the first episode, "Coin Flip". The same year in June, the song was used in the Netflix animated series This World Can't Tear Me Down by Zerocalcare, at the end of the sixth episode, "No Place for You".

== Charts ==
=== Weekly charts ===
Chart (2015–2017)	Peak position
Austria (Ö3 Austria Top 40)	5
Belgium (Ultratop 50 Flanders)	4
Belgium (Ultratop 50 Wallonia)	5
Canada Hot 100 (Billboard)	23
Canada AC (Billboard)	20
Canada CHR/Top 40 (Billboard)	12
Canada Hot AC (Billboard)	6
Canada Rock (Billboard)	2
Czech Republic Airplay (ČNS IFPI)	5
France (SNEP)	63
Germany (GfK)	18
Iceland (Tónlistinn)	30
Italy (FIMI)	11
Italy Airplay (EarOne)	1
Luxembourg Digital Songs (Billboard)	10
Mexico Ingles Airplay (Billboard)	24
Netherlands Single Tip (MegaCharts)	25
Slovakia Airplay (ČNS IFPI)	10
Slovakia Singles Digital (ČNS IFPI)	81
Slovenia (SloTop50)	22
Switzerland (Schweizer Hitparade)	18
UK Independent (Official Charts)	44
US Bubbling Under Hot 100 (Billboard)	9
US Adult Pop Airplay (Billboard)	22
US Hot Rock & Alternative Songs (Billboard)	7
US Rock & Alternative Airplay (Billboard)	2
US Alternative Airplay (Billboard)	1
US Adult Alternative Airplay (Billboard)	3

Chart (2020)	Peak position
Scottish Singles Sales (Official Charts)	78
UK Independent (Official Charts)	44

=== Year-end charts ===
Chart (2016)	Position
Austria (Ö3 Austria Top 40)	35
Belgium (Ultratop Flanders)	31
Belgium (Ultratop Wallonia)	57
Canada (Canadian Hot 100)	77
Germany (Official German Charts)	68
Italy (FIMI)	40
Switzerland (Schweizer Hitparade)	52
US Hot Rock Songs (Billboard)	21
US Rock Airplay (Billboard)	9
US Alternative Songs (Billboard)	7
US Adult Alternative Songs (Billboard)	22

== Certifications ==
Region	Certification	Certified units/sales
Belgium (BRMA)	Gold	10,000^{‡}
Brazil (Pro-Música Brasil)	Gold	30,000^{‡}
Canada (Music Canada)	5× Platinum	400,000^{‡}
France (SNEP)	Gold	66,666^{‡}
Germany (BVMI)	Platinum	400,000^{‡}
Italy (FIMI)	3× Platinum	150,000^{‡}
New Zealand (RMNZ)	Gold	15,000^{‡}
South Africa (RISA)	Gold	10,000^{*}
United Kingdom (BPI)	Silver	200,000^{‡}
United States (RIAA)	Platinum	1,000,000^{‡}
^{*} Sales figures based on certification alone.^{‡} Sales+streaming figures based on certification alone.
