= La profezia dell'armadillo =

2018 Italian comedy-drama film

- Italian: La profezia dell'armadillo
- Directed by: Emanuele Scaringi
- Written by: Zerocalcare (story); Oscar Glioti; Valerio Mastandrea; Johnny Palomba
- Produced by: Domenico Procacci
- Starring: Simone Liberati; Valerio Aprea; Pietro Castellitto; Laura Morante
- Cinematography: Gherardo Gossi
- Edited by: Roberto Di Tanna
- Music by: Giorgio Giampà; Nic Cester
- Production companies: Fandango; Rai Cinema
- Distributed by: Fandango
- Release dates: 3 September 2018 (Venice); 13 September 2022 (Italy)
- Running time: 99 minutes
- Country: Italy
- Language: Italian
- Box office: $333,955

La profezia dell'armadillo (lit. 'The Prophecy of the Armadillo') is a 2018 Italian comedy-drama film directed by Emanuele Scaringi.

The film is loosely based on the 2011 graphic novel of the same name by Zerocalcare. It premiered on 3 September 2018 at the 75th Venice International Film Festival in the "Horizons" section, and was released in Italy on 13 September 2018.

== Plot ==
Zero is a 27-year-old aspiring cartoonist living in Rebibbia, a neighborhood on the outskirts of Rome. He spends his days in the company of his mother and his childhood friend Secco, as well as conversing with his own critical conscience in the form of an anthropomorphic armadillo. To support himself, Zero works surveying passengers at an airport and tutoring a wealthy middle-schooler. One night, he is devastated to learn by email that Camille, a childhood crush from Toulouse to whom he never confessed his love, has died as a result of anorexia. After telling the news to his mother and Secco, Zero has recurrent flashbacks of their time together.

Years earlier, as children, Zero meets Camille at a party. Though their first encounter is brief, they meet again while traveling by bus to an exhibit about Japanese culture and soon become close. Camille is introduced to Secco and Greta, the latter another friend of theirs at the time who is now estranged. They bond through shared experiences, such as spending time together and camping, and at one point, the four vow to always live in the present. Camille returns to Toulouse after turning 15. When she returns to Rome to visit Zero, she confesses to missing her former life. Just as Zero tries to console her, the Armadillo appears, offering his guidance. Zero rejects the Armadillo, leaving him in the corridor, next to a sinister mental entity that personifies Camille's declining mental health.

In the present, Zero and Secco attempt to learn about Greta's whereabouts. They eventually locate her, but after more than ten years, Greta is virtually unrecognizable, having become a wealthy, superficial woman and married a lawyer. Greta reveals that she and Camille also became estranged and shows little interest in attending Camille's funeral.

The film also follows situations in which Zero fails to uphold or outright violates his own values, often being reprimanded by the Armadillo as a result. These include him reporting a coworker he liked at the airport in an unsuccessful attempt to extend his own contract, leading to her being fired, lying about his skills in a job interview to become a graphic designer, and breaking the vow by robbing a sweater he believes to have been his from a street performer. In addition, the student he tutored is sent to a monastery after experiencing a religious calling, ultimately inspired by Zero's talks about politics and ethics, thus leaving him unemployed. At that point, the Armadillo explains that his "prophecy" essentially refers to any overtly optimistic and rationalized hope one might hold, despite all reason.

Zero and Secco arrange to meet Camille's family in Toulouse for the ceremony. After acting as a translator for Secco, Zero plays one of Camille's favorite songs and expresses his overwhelming frustration and powerlessness at her death. Back in Rome, Zero wanders the streets, reminiscing about Camille. He falls asleep on a bench, only to be woken up by the Armadillo, who immediately resumes berating him as usual and demands radical changes in his behavior. Initially irritated, Zero becomes enraged and assaults the Armadillo after he claims that Camille was romantically interested in Secco rather than him.

After reconciling, Zero apologizes to the Armadillo and begins his new job as a graphic designer. While the Armadillo expresses pride in Zero for taking steps toward becoming a respectable adult, he also cautions him against compromising his values for the job's sake, right before vanishing. The film concludes with a flashback to the moment when Zero, Secco, Greta, and Camille take their vow, accompanied by a voiceover from the adult Zero reflecting on their lives.

== Cast ==
- Simone Liberati as Zero
  - Valerio Ardovino as young Zero
- Valerio Aprea as the Armadillo
- Pietro Castellitto as Secco
  - Matteo Giordani as young Secco
- Laura Morante as Zero's mother
- Sofia Staderini as Camille
- Diana Del Bufalo as Greta
  - Bianca Di Veroli as young Greta
- Gianluca Gobbi as the hippie
- Samuele Biscossi as Blanka
- Claudia Pandolfi as Blanka's mother
- Marianna Di Martino as Danieli
- Teco Celio and Marcella Nardini as Mr. and Mrs. Panatta
- Stefano Scherini as the airport manager
- Vincent Candela as Camille's father
- Gianmarco Vettori as Camille's cousin
- Ugo De Cesare as Max
- Guglielmo Poggi as Piergiorgio
- Federica Zacchia as Ludovica
- Kasia Smutniak and Marco Giuliani as the street cleaners
- Adriano Panatta as himself
- Valentina Correani as Gina
- Valentino Campitelli and Emanuele Linfatti as the billstickers
- Giulia Valentini and Michela De Rossi as the downtown girls
- Fabrizio Colica as the "vampire guy"

== Soundtrack ==
A soundtrack album was released in 2020. In both the graphic novel and the film, one of Camille's favorite songs is "Motivés, le chant des partisans" by the French group Motivé-e-s.

No.	Title	Writer(s)	Length
1.	"I Know the Monster"	Nic Cester, Giorgio Giampà	3:44
2.	"Camille"	Giorgio Giampà	2:17
3.	"Mammuth a Rebibbia"	Giorgio Giampà	2:05
4.	"Armadillo"	Giorgio Giampà	0:57
5.	"Zero"	Giorgio Giampà	1:14
6.	"Tres Demotive"	Giorgio Giampà	1:26
7.	"La Noche del Armadillo"	Veeble	3:43
8.	"Love Buzz"	Veeble	4:21
9.	"Katabum"	Veeble	3:19
Total length:			23:06

== Themes ==
Both the film and the graphic novel are fictionalized autobiographies that depict various aspects of everyday life through Rech's own experiences. The story's main focus is how close friendships might come to an end, either by death or by simply growing distant. Another major theme is the financial vulnerability and lack of career prospects of Rech's generation. The film's director stated, "It is the places where ordinary people live [Rebibbia] that interest me. An unusual part of the city, not the picture-postcard centre – where Zero and Secco refuse to go – but a metropolis of the world where the social classes are mixed up."

== See also ==
- Zerocalcare
- Tear Along the Dotted Line
