= My Brother Chases Dinosaurs =

2019 film

- Directed by: Stefano Cipani
- Screenplay by: Fabio Bonifacci
- Starring: Alessandro Gassmann; Isabella Ragonese
- Cinematography: Sergio Batroli
- Edited by: Massimo Quaglia
- Music by: Lucas Vidal
- Release dates: 2 September 2019 (Venice); 5 September 2019 (Italy); 24 July 2020 (Spain)
- Countries: Italy; Spain
- Language: Italian

My Brother Chases Dinosaurs (Italian: Mio fratello rincorre i dinosauri, Spanish: Mi hermano persigue dinosaurios) is a 2019 Italian-Spanish comedy film directed by Stefano Cipani. It is based on the best-selling autobiographical novel with the same name by Giacomo Mazzariol.

The film premiered at the 76th edition of the Venice Film Festival, in the Giornate degli Autori sidebar. It won the European Film Academy Young Audience Award at the 33rd European Film Awards.

== Plot ==
Giacomo "Jack" is a child who lives in Pieve di Cento, with his parents Davide and Katia and his older sisters Chiara and Alice. One day he receives the news that he will soon have a brother, who will be called Giovanni (Giò). When his little brother is born, Jack and his family discover that Giovanni has Down syndrome. Initially Jack is happy, because he believes that his little brother is some kind of superhero, but over time he will understand that his parents have let him believe something very different from reality.

Years later Jack has to choose a high school together with Vittorio (Vitto), his best friend ever. Jack meets Arianna there and falls in love, then decides to enter the same school as the girl, persuading Vittorio to follow him. When he arrives at school, Jack suffers from his shyness and would like to be similar to his older classmates, so he joins his beloved Arianna's group to impress her. He then decides to join the band of the two boys he considers most admired at school. Nonetheless, Jack often feels uncomfortable and is unable to tell anyone that he has a brother with Down syndrome. His silence on the subject gradually turns into a bigger and bigger lie.

Jack then discovers that the band he plays in has a YouTube channel, and he shows it to his family too. Little Giovanni then decides to make videos too and puts them on YouTube helped by Vittorio. Jack discovers the videos because some of his companions see them, he deletes them, placing the blame on a non-existent neo-Nazi group. Not being able to ignore what happened, the boy's family organizes a protest against the alleged neo-Nazi movement in which Jack, Arianna and his class also participate.

Finally determined to stop lying, Jack publicly confesses to deleting Giovanni's videos and lying about his brother. Jack has disappointed everyone, and everyone is furious with him. As time passes, however, he apologizes to his family, his class, and especially to Vittorio and Arianna, becoming best friends again.

== Cast ==
- Alessandro Gassmann as Davide Mazzariol
- Isabella Ragonese as Katia
- Francesco Gheghi as Giacomo "Jack" Mazzariol
- Lorenzo Sisto as Giovanni Mazzariol
- Arianna Becheroni as Arianna
- Roberto Nocchi as Vittorio
- Rossy de Palma as Aunt Dolores
- Gea Dall'Orto as Dalila Mazzariol
- Mariavittoria Dallasta as Alice Mazzariol
- Edoardo Pagliai as Scar
- Saul Nanni as Brune

== Release ==
The film had its world premiere in the Giornate degli Autori sidebar section of the 76th Venice International Film Festival on 2 September 2019. Distributed by Eagle Pictures, it opened in Italian cinemas on 5 September 2019. It was released theatrically in Spain on 24 July 2020 by Bosco Films.
