= Emanuele Linfatti =

Italian actor (born 1994)

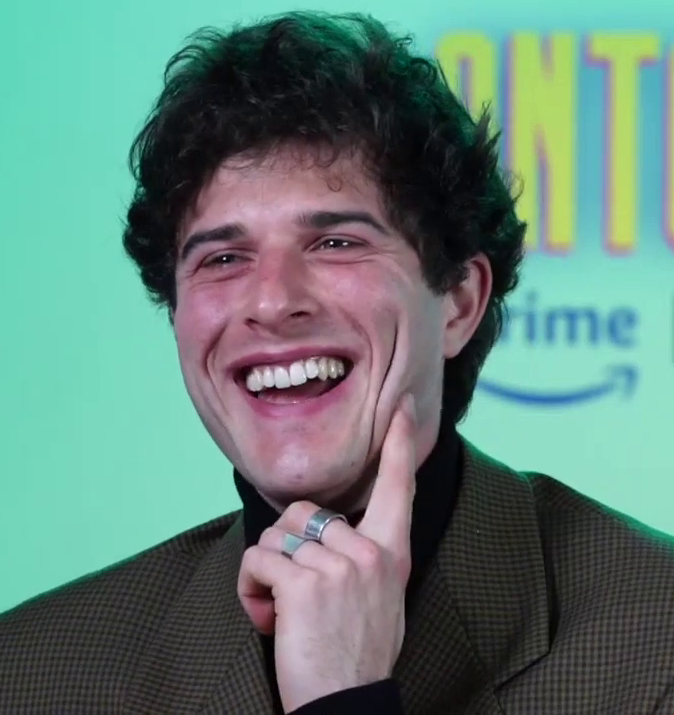
- Born: 22 November 1994 (age 30); Rome, Italy
- Occupation: Actor
- Years active: 2018–present

Emanuele Linfatti (born 22 November 1994) is an Italian actor.

== Career ==
Born in Rome in 1994, he graduated at the Silvio D'Amico National Academy of Dramatic Art in 2017.

In 2018, he made his film debut with a minor role in Emanuele Scaringi's La profezia dell'armadillo, and the following year he played the lead in the Swiss film L'ombra del figlio. In 2020, he was in the main cast of the Rai 1 television series Vivi e lascia vivere, in the role of Andrea. He portrayed Mattia Riva in the 2020 Netflix film The Beast and was among the protagonists of the 2021 drama The Great Silence, directed by Alessandro Gassmann.

In 2022, he is one of the three protagonists of Margins, which premiered at the International Critics' Week of the 79th Venice International Film Festival.

== Filmography ==
Film
| Year | Title | Role | Notes |
|---|---|---|---|
| 2018 | La profezia dell'armadillo | Billsticker | |
| 2019 | L'ombra del figlio | Alberto Barbieri | |
| 2019 | Martin Eden | Jean | |
| 2020 | The Predators | Jacopo | |
| 2020 | The Beast | Mattia Riva | |
| 2021 | The Great Silence | Massimiliano Primic | |
| 2022 | Margins | Edoardo | |
| 2023 | Diabolik: Who Are You? | Martin | |

Television
| Year | Title | Role | Notes |
|---|---|---|---|
| 2018 | Don Matteo | Gregorio Müller | TV series; episode "Genitori e figli" |
| 2019 | Liberi tutti | Artist | TV series; 2 episodes |
| 2020 | Vivi e lascia vivere | Andrea | TV series; 10 episodes |
| 2024 | Antonia | Michele | TV series; 6 episodes |
