= This World Can't Tear Me Down =

- Questo mondo non mi renderà cattivo
- Genre: Adult animation; Comedy drama
- Created by: Zerocalcare
- Written by: Zerocalcare
- Creative director: Erika De Nicola
- Opening theme: "Sei in un paese meraviglioso"
- Composer: Giancane
- Country of origin: Italy
- Original languages: Italian; Romanesco
- No. of episodes: 6

Production
- Executive producers: Francesca Ettorre; Magali Fuzellier; Giovanna Bò; Michele Foschini
- Producers: Davide Rosio; Giorgio Scorza
- Production companies: Movimenti Production; DogHead Animation

Original release
- Network: Netflix
- Release: 9 June 2023

Related
- Tear Along the Dotted Line; My 2 Cents

This World Can't Tear Me Down (Italian: Questo mondo non mi renderà cattivo) is an Italian adult animated comedy drama television series written and directed by cartoonist Zerocalcare. It is the second animated series by Zerocalcare after Tear Along the Dotted Line, which features the same characters, and it can be considered a standalone sequel to the previous work. It was released internationally by the streaming platform Netflix on 9 June 2023. The series received generally positive reviews from critics, with praise towards its animation, story and emotional weight.

== Plot ==
The story revolves around the opening of a refugee shelter in an eastern neighbourhood of Rome, which has exacerbated tensions between neo-Nazis and local anti-fascists, including Zero. Meanwhile, an old friend returns to the neighbourhood after several years of absence and struggles to recognise the world he grew up in. Zero would like to do something for him, but realises he is unable to help him feel at home again.

== Episodes ==
No.	Title	Original release date
1	Quel che è di Cesare (What belongs to Caesar)	9 June 2023
2	Come una balena spiaggiata (Like a beached whale)	9 June 2023
3	Il faro (The Beacon)	9 June 2023
4	Chi denuncia per primo è infame due volte (First to denounce is twice a traitor)	9 June 2023
5	Quattro miliardi di anni luce (Four billion light years)	9 June 2023
6	Non c'è un posto per te (No place for you)	9 June 2023

== Cast ==
=== Italian original ===
- Zerocalcare, voiced by himself
- Armadillo, voiced by Valerio Mastandrea
- Secco, voiced by Zerocalcare in the past and by Paolo Vivio in the present
- Sarah, voiced by Zerocalcare in the past and by Chiara Gioncardi in the present
- Cesare, voiced by Zerocalcare
- Mama Lady-Cocca, voiced by Zerocalcare
- Friend Pterodactyl, voiced by Zerocalcare in the past and by Ughetta d'Onorascenzo in the present
- Detective of the Digos, voiced by Silvio Orlando
- Agent Tonelli, voiced by Gianluca Cortesi
- Agent Falvetta, voiced by Gianluca Crisafi
- Agent De Niro, voiced by Michele Foschini
- Amira, voiced by Zerocalcare in the past and by Sara Labidi in the present
- Cinghiale, voiced by Zerocalcare
- Teapot Friend, voiced by Zerocalcare
- Greta Buffetti, voiced by Zerocalcare
- Mauro Coccodrello, voiced by Zerocalcare
- Ludovico, voiced by Zerocalcare
- Nazi, voiced by Zerocalcare in the past and by Stefano Thermes in the present
- Lawyer, voiced by Graziella Polesinanti

=== English dub ===
- Zerocalcare voiced by Adam Rhys Dee
- Armadillo, voiced by James Acaster (replacing Wayne Forester, who voiced Armadillo in Tear Along the Dotted Line)

== Soundtrack ==
The original soundtrack is composed by Giancane and is collected in the album Sei in un paese meraviglioso. Other tracks chosen by Zerocalcare for the soundtrack included music by The Clash, Counting Crows, The Cure, California Calling, Moderat, Oasis, Luca Trucillo, Chumbawamba, Bruce Maginnis, Stiff Little Fingers, Hanson, Neja, The Connells, Fabio Valente and the Bull Brigade, Cigarettes After Sex, Lou Reed, 883, El Santo, Biagio Antonacci, Path, Angelic Upstarts, Ricchi e Poveri, Videoclub, XXXTentacion and The Strumbellas.

== Production ==
The series was announced on 6 May 2022, and marks the cartoonist's second collaboration with Netflix after Tear Along the Dotted Line. On 17 November 2022, the series title and release date were announced, while the first trailer was released during an evening of the Sanremo Music Festival 2023. On 21 May 2023, the official teaser trailer was unveiled, featuring characters already seen in the previous series with the addition of a new one, Cesare.

== Promotion ==
The first trailer of the animated series was broadcast on 9 February 2023 on Rai 1 during the third day of the seventy-third Sanremo Festival. The second trailer was released on 5 April 2023, minutes after the announcement of the release date and the first images aired in an exclusive report on TG1 at 20:00. The final trailer was released online on 21 May 2023.

== Distribution ==
The six episodes of the series were released on Netflix on 9 June 2023.

== Reception ==
This World Can't Tear Me Down has been positively received by critics. Antonio Cuomo of Movieplayer gave the series 4 out of 5 stars, praising the animation, voice acting and story in particular; while Emanuele Manta of Coming Soon gave it 4.5 out of 5 stars.

== Other media ==
On 5 May 2023, Bao Publishing announced the Zerocalcare Animation Art Book, the official artbook of the series.
