= Gea Dall'Orto =

Italian actress (born 2002)

- Born: 22 October 2002 (age 23); Bagno a Ripoli, Florence, Tuscany, Italy
- Education: Sapienza University of Rome (degree in Arts and Sciences of Entertainment)
- Occupation: Actress
- Years active: 2012–present
- Height: 1.66 m (5 ft 5.35 in)

Gea Dall'Orto (born 22 October 2002) is an Italian actress.

== Biography ==
Born in 2002 in Bagno a Ripoli (Florence), she developed a passion for acting at the age of seven. She made her stage debut as a touring actress in the family theater company "Mannini Dall'Orto Teatro", alongside her grandfather, Italo Dall'Orto (an actor and director), and from an early age dreamed of film.

She continued her training at "DVAS - Formazione ENTRARTe" in Florence, with Alessio Di Clemente, while also continuing to prepare for roles with coaches such as Anna Redi and Aurin Proietti. After high school, she decided to enroll in the Faculty of Arts and Sciences of Entertainment at the Sapienza University of Rome.

In 2012, she made her film acting debut in the film Le piccole idee, directed by Giacomo Faenza. The following year, she starred in the short film Broken Dolls by Andrea Zurlo and directed by Karin Marzocchini. In 2014, she played the role of Zingara in the film The Tourist, directed by Evan Oppenheimer. That same year, she played the role of Maria in the short film All or nothing, directed by Maciej Kawalski. In 2015, she starred in the short film L'esercito dei fantasmi, directed by Alessandro D'Aquino.

In 2016, she played the role of ten-year-old Alice in the film L'Universale, directed by Federico Micali. That same year, she played the role of Martina in the series È arrivata la felicità. Also in 2016, she played the role of Matilda in the short film Grow Up, directed by Samuel Alfani. The following year, she played the role of Gypsy Girl in the film Un'estate a Firenze, directed by Evan Oppenheimer.

In 2018, she played the role of Federica in the film Simple Women, directed by Chiara Malta. That same year, she played Stella Guarini in the episode Una questione personale of the series Don Matteo. Also in 2018, she starred in the short film Fuxia, directed by Alessandro D'Aquino.

In 2019, she played the role of Chiara Mazzariol in the film My Brother Chases Dinosaurs, directed by Stefano Cipani. The following year, she played Gioia Merani in the series Gli orologi del diavolo. That same year, she played the role of Ofelia in the short film Rosa di maggio, directed by Graziano Staino.

In 2021, she was cast as Miranda Leoni in the series Luce dei tuoi occhi, where she starred alongside actors such as Anna Valle and Giuseppe Zeno. That same year, she played the role of seventeen-year-old Francesca in the film Three Floors directed by Nanni Moretti.

In 2022, she played the role of Marta in the RaiPlay miniseries Cabala - Le vergini del fuoco. That same year, she played the role of Martina in the television film Rinascere, directed by Umberto Marino. In 2024 she played the character of Maria Filangieri in the film Io e te dobbiamo parlare, directed by Alessandro Siani.

== Filmography ==
=== Film ===
Year	Title	Role	Notes
2012	Le piccole idee		
2013	Broken Dolls		Short film
2014	All or Nothing	Maria	Short film
2014	The Tourist	Gypsy	
2015	L'esercito dei fantasmi		Short film
2016	Grow Up		Short film
2016	L'Universale	Alice	
2017	Un'estate a Firenze	Gypsy Girl	
2018	Simple Women	Federica	
2018	Fuxia		Short film
2019	My Brother Chases Dinosaurs	Chiara Mazzariol	
2020	Rosa di maggio	Ofelia	Short film
2021	Three Floors	Francesca	
2022	Rinascere	Martina	TV film
2024	Io e te dobbiamo parlare	Maria Filangieri	

=== Television ===
Year	Title	Role	Notes
2016	È arrivata la felicità	Martina	TV series, 3 episodes
2018	Don Matteo	Stella	TV series, episode 11x15
2020	Gli orologi del diavolo	Gioia Merani	TV miniseries, 8 episodes
2021–2023	Luce dei tuoi occhi	Miranda Leoni	TV series, 12 episode
2022	Cabala - Le vergini del fuoco	Marta	TV miniseries

== Theater ==
Year	Title	Author	Theatre
2011–2012	Sei personaggi in cerca d'autore	Luigi Pirandello	Teatro Carcano in Milan
2013	Il Mago di Oz		Puccini Theater in Florence

== Commercials ==
Year	Title	Country	Location
2013	Glamour Girl	France	Diaframma studies in Florence
2015	Play Station	France	Mark Studio in Prato
2015	Guerre stellari		Diaframma studies in Florence
