= Jimmy Chauveau =

- Born: March 16, 1989 (age 37); Chertsey, England
- Genres: indie rock, alternative country, folk rock, folk-pop
- Instruments: Singing, acoustic guitar, bass guitar
- Member of: The Strumbellas; Kadeema
- Formerly of: Ascot Royals

James David Chauveau (born 16 March 1989) is a Canadian–British singer, songwriter, guitarist, musician and, as of 2022, the frontman of the Canadian band The Strumbellas. He was previously the lead singer of the Ascot Royals.

== Life and career ==
He was born on 16 March 1989 in Chertsey.

Around 2000 he and his family moved from the United Kingdom to Brantford, Ontario, Canada. At the age of fifteen, he was given an acoustic guitar by his brother Ben. Ben co-founded the musical group Ascot Royals, from whom Jimmy would later accept an offer to join as a singer. He initially sang backing vocals. Later, he became the band's lead singer.

The group performed mainly in Brantford, a signed a contract with Sony. They began performing across Canada, including Toronto, where Chauveau moved. In 2019, the group split up. All the members went in different directions. Chauveau and Tal Veisman founded the band Kadeema.

In 2022 he became the new lead singer of The Strumbellas, after their founding singer Simon Ward decided to withdraw and assume a behind-the-scenes role as a songwriter.

They started composing new songs together. This resulted in the new studio album Part Time Believer (2024). They followed up the album with the release of an EP called Burning Bridges into Dust in 2025.

== Discography ==
=== Studio albums ===
==== with The Strumbellas ====
- Part Time Believer (2024)
- Burning Bridges into Dust – EP (2025)

==== with Ascot Royals ====
- Awkward When I Stop (2009) – CD
- Don't Let It Stop You (2012) – CD, album
- New Skin (2017) – EP

==== with Kadeema ====
- Napoleon Tornapart (2020)
