= Hope (The Strumbellas album) =

Studio album by the Strumbellas
- Released: April 22, 2016
- Genres: Alternative rock; folk rock; indie pop
- Length: 42:25
- Labels: Glassnote; Underneath a Mountain
- Producer: Dave Schiffman

The Strumbellas chronology
We Still Move on Dance Floors (2013)	Hope (2016)	Rattlesnake (2019)

Singles from Hope
- 1. "Spirits" Released: January 28, 2016; 2. "We Don't Know" Released: September 8, 2016; 3. "Young & Wild" Released: January 31, 2017

Hope is the third studio album by Canadian indie rock band the Strumbellas. The album was released on April 22, 2016, by Glassnote Records and Underneath a Mountain Records.

== Background ==
The album is the third studio album to be released by the Strumbellas. The album was originally planned for a release date of February 5, 2016, but was pushed back to April 22. It contains the band's most successful song, "Spirits", which was released as a single on January 28, 2016. The track "We Don't Know" was released as a single of September 8, 2016. The track "Young & Wild" was released as a single to alternative radio on January 31, 2017.

== Track listing ==
All tracks are written by Simon Ward.

No.	Title	Length
1.	"Spirits"	3:23
2.	"Shovels & Dirt"	4:01
3.	"We Don't Know"	4:33
4.	"Wars"	3:26
5.	"Dog"	3:24
6.	"The Hired Band"	3:49
7.	"Young & Wild"	4:27
8.	"The Night Will Save Us"	3:49
9.	"I Still Make Her Cry"	2:31
10.	"David"	4:32
11.	"Wild Sun"	4:29
Total length:		42:25

== Reception ==
The New York Times gave the album a positive review, describing it as "pop-savvy folk rock" reminiscent of the Lumineers.

== Personnel ==
Credits adapted from AllMusic.

=== The Strumbellas ===
- Simon Ward – guitar, lead vocals
- Jeremy Drury – drums, percussion, vocals
- Jon Hembrey – guitar, vocals
- Darryl James – bass, vocals
- Isabel Ritchie – viola, violin, vocals
- David Ritter – keyboards, percussion, vocals

=== Additional musicians ===
- Alex Arias – editing
- Krystle Blue – vocals
- John Dinsmore – engineer, slide guitar
- Annisa Hart – cello
- Joel Hustak – artwork, layout
- Brian Pickett - composer
- Dave Shiffman – producer, engineer
- Jason Sniderman – piano
- William Sperandei – trumpet
- Gentry Studer – assistant mastering engineer
- Richard Underhill – saxophone
- Howie Weinberg – mastering

== Charts ==
Chart performance for Hope
Chart (2016)	Peak position
Belgian Albums (Ultratop Flanders)	129
Belgian Albums (Ultratop Wallonia)	143
Canadian Albums (Billboard)	3
Italian Albums (FIMI)	47
Swiss Albums (Schweizer Hitparade)	68
UK Americana Albums (Official Charts)	25
US Billboard 200	98
US Americana/Folk Albums (Billboard)	3
US Top Alternative Albums (Billboard)	9
US Top Rock Albums (Billboard)	12

== Certifications ==
Certifications for Hope
Region	Certification	Certified units/sales
Canada (Music Canada)	Platinum	80,000^{‡}
^{‡} Sales+streaming figures based on certification alone.
