= Short Skin =

2014 Italian film

- Poster
- Italian: Short Skin - I dolori del giovane Edo
- Directed by: Duccio Chiarini
- Written by: Duccio Chiarini; Ottavia Madeddu; Marco Pettenello; Miroslav Mandic
- Produced by: Duccio Chiarini; Babak Jalali
- Starring: Matteo Creatini
- Cinematography: Baris Obzicer
- Edited by: Roberto Di Tanna
- Music by: Woodpigeon
- Release date: 30 August 2014 (Venice Film Festival)
- Running time: 86 minutes
- Country: Italy
- Language: Italian

Short Skin (Italian: Short Skin - I dolori del giovane Edo) is a 2014 Italian comedy film directed by Duccio Chiarini in his feature film debut, and starring Matteo Creatini.

The film premiered on 30 August 2014 at the 71st Venice International Film Festival in the "Biennale College" sidebar, and was screened on 8 February 2015 at the 65th Berlin Film Festival in the "Generation" section. The film was released in Italy on 23 April 2015.

It was awarded with a Grand Prix at the Cabourg Film Festival, and with a Ciak d'Oro for best directorial debut.

== Plot ==
Seventeen-year-old Edoardo, a young man from Pisa, suffers from phimosis, which makes it impossible for him not only to have sexual intercourse but also to masturbate. He and his family spend the summer on the Tuscan seafront, where he begins to suffer the first pangs of love for Bianca, his neighbor, who is about to go to study in Paris.

Cloaked in his asexual world, Edoardo is annoyed by the fact that everyone around him seems to always talk only about sex: his friend Arturo, with his obsession with losing his virginity, his parents, who pressure Edoardo to propose to Bianca, and his little sister, Olivia, who wants to mate her dog.

However, it isn't the pressure from others that breaks Edoardo's shyness, but rather a meeting with a girl he meets by chance and Bianca's unexpected openness to him. Thus, forced to leave his world, Edoardo will initially try to solve his problem through clumsy stratagems to finally find the courage to face his fears and undergo circumcision surgery.

== Cast ==
- Matteo Creatini as Edoardo
- Francesca Agostini as Bianca
- Nicola Nocchi as Arturo
- Miriana Raschillà as Elisabetta
- Bianca Ceravolo as Olivia
- Michele Crestacci as Roberto
- Bianca Nappi as Daniela
- Crisula Stafida as Pamela
- Francesco Acquaroli as the Doctor
- Lisa Granuzza Di Vita as Lara
- Anna Ferzetti as Anna
