= Caro mondo crudele =

2026 Italian film

- Film poster
- Italian: Caro mondo crudele
- Directed by: Niccolò Falsetti
- Written by: Niccolò Falsetti; Tommaso Renzoni; Francesco Turbanti; Giovanna Vicari
- Produced by: Alessandro Amato; Luigi Giuseppe Chimienti; Manetti Bros.; Pier Giorgio Bellocchio; Domenico Procacci; Laura Paolucci
- Starring: Aurora Malianni; Tara Trocchia; Francesco Turbanti; Petra Valentini; Leonardo Baldoni; Sergio Pierattini
- Cinematography: Alessandro Veridiani
- Edited by: Paolo Landolfi
- Music by: Giancane
- Production companies: Dispàrte; Mompracem; Fandango; Rai Cinema
- Distributed by: Fandango
- Release dates: 16 October 2026 (Rome); 22 October 2026 (Italy)
- Running time: 105 minutes
- Country: Italy
- Language: Italian

Caro mondo crudele is a 2026 Italian coming-of-age comedy-drama film directed by Niccolò Falsetti and co-written by Falsetti and Francesco Turbanti, who also stars alongside Aurora Malianni, Tara Trocchia and Petra Valentini. Set in Maremma in the late 1990s, it follows twelve-year-old Giovanna as she searches for her best friend Mirko after his disappearance. The film features original music by Giancane and animated sequences based on designs by cartoonist Zerocalcare.

The film premiered at the 21st Rome Film Festival on 16 October 2026 and was released theatrically in Italy on 22 October 2026.

== Plot ==
In 1999, Giovanna Ferretti lives in Albinia, a small town in Maremma, with her mother Sabrina, a teacher. Having lost her beloved father, Giovanna attends middle school, where her shy, awkward and quiet nature makes her a frequent target of bullying. Her classmates mockingly call her "Giovacca", a derogatory nickname combining her name with the Italian word vacca ("cow"). Her closest friend is Mirko, with whom she spends carefree days, often filming their adventures with a video camera. To cope with the bullying and hardships of school life, Giovanna retreats into her imagination, drawing strength from the memory of her father Sergio. She envisions him as a superhero who advises and protects her, taking on the appearance of Kenshiro from the anime series Fist of the North Star.

One morning, Mirko fails to show up at school. The nervous and evasive behaviour of the teachers and other adults leads Giovanna to suspect that something has happened to him. Determined to find out the truth, she overhears her teacher Alberto discussing with the school principal a certain "note" that Mirko is believed to have left before disappearing.

During a school play, Giovanna overhears one of the bullies insulting Mirko and attacks him, resulting in a collective disciplinary note being issued. This provokes the anger of Ludovica Cardini, a student who has been held back several times and is nicknamed "The Hammer" because of her formidable fighting skills. Ludovica threatens to make Giovanna pay for her actions.

One morning, Giovanna covers for Ludovica when she is confronted by the school janitor. The incident brings the two girls closer, and they gradually develop a complicated relationship oscillating between hostility and affection. With her help, Giovanna continues trying to discover what happened to Mirko.

== Cast ==
- Aurora Malianni as Giovanna
- Tara Trocchia as Ludovica
- Francesco Turbanti as Alberto Vitali
- Petra Valentini as Sabrina
- Leonardo Baldoni as Mirko
- Elena Fioravanti as Jessica
- Giulio Iapichino as Mulatto
- Samuele Sabatini as Hon Jon
- Guglielmo Tanganelli as Santo
- Sergio Pierattini as Attilio Ponti
- Francesco Mancini as Leandro
- Teresa Tanini as Gisella
- Niccolò Falsetti as Sergio (voice)
- Guglielmo Favilla as the punk leader (voice)
- Zerocalcare as the Tooth Mouse (voice)
- Giancane as Santa Claus (voice)

== Production ==
Filming took place in Tuscany, primarily in Albinia, with additional locations in Orbetello, Grosseto, Ribolla, Gavorrano, and Roccastrada. The shoot ran for four weeks in May and June 2025. Production later moved to Apulia for the animated sequences, which were based on designs by cartoonist Zerocalcare and used to visualise the main character's imagination.

== Music ==
The film's original score was composed by Giancane.

Caro mondo crudele

Soundtrack album by Giancane
- Released: 22 October 2026
- Genre: punk
- Label: UVAT

=== Track listing ===
Caro mondo crudele (Original Motion Picture Soundtrack)
No.	Title	Writer(s)	Producer(s)	Length
1.	"Arubinia"	Giancane	Giancane	2:58
2.	"Shotenken of Madness"	Giancane	Giancane	2:49
3.	"Killennio"	Giancane	Giancane	2:23
4.	"La notte (CMC Version)"	Giancane	Giancane; Guglielmo Nodari	2:55
