= Duccio Chiarini =

Italian film director (born 1977)

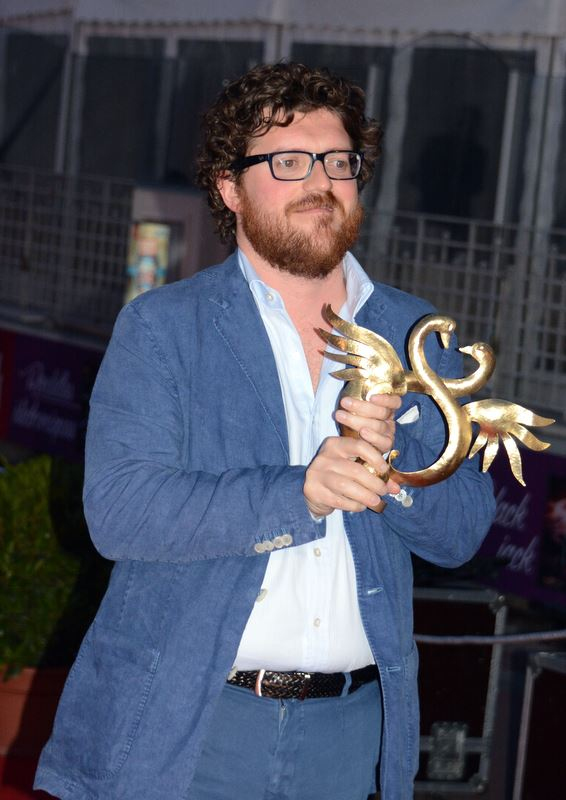
- Chiarini at the 2015 Cabourg Film Festival
- Born: 30 June 1977 (age 48); Florence, Italy
- Occupation: Film director

Duccio Chiarini (born 30 June 1977) is an Italian film director, documentarist, screenwriter and producer.

== Life and career ==
Born in Florence, Chiarini graduated in direction at the London Film School. After directing some shorts, he made his feature film debut with the autobiographical and documentary Hit the Road, Nonna, about his grandmother, the stylist Delia Ubaldi. The film premiered at the 68th Venice International Film Festival, in the Venice Days section, and received a special mention at the 2012 Silver Ribbon Awards.

Chiarini's narrative feature film debut Short Skin premiered at the 69th Venice International Film Festival in the "Biennale College" sidebar, and was screened at the 65th Berlin International Film Festival in the "Generation" section. It received several awards, including the Grand Prix at the 2015 Cabourg Film Festival, and the Ciak d'Oro for best first work.

Chiarini's 2018 film The Guest premiered at the 71st Locarno Film Festival, in which it won the Swiss Critics Boccalino Award for Best Film. In 2023, his documentary about Italo Calvino The Writer in the Trees premiered at the 80th Venice International Film Festival, in the Giornate degli Autori program.

== Selected filmography ==
- Hit the Road, Nonna (documentary, 2011)
- Short Skin (2014)
- Settembre (documentary, 2015)
- The Guest (2018)
- Marco Polo (documentary, 2019)
- L'occhio di vetro (documentary, 2020)
- The Writer in the Trees (documentary, 2023)
