= Piazza del Liberty, Milan =

Pedestrian square in Milan, Italy

Coordinates: 45.46550°N 9.19418°E

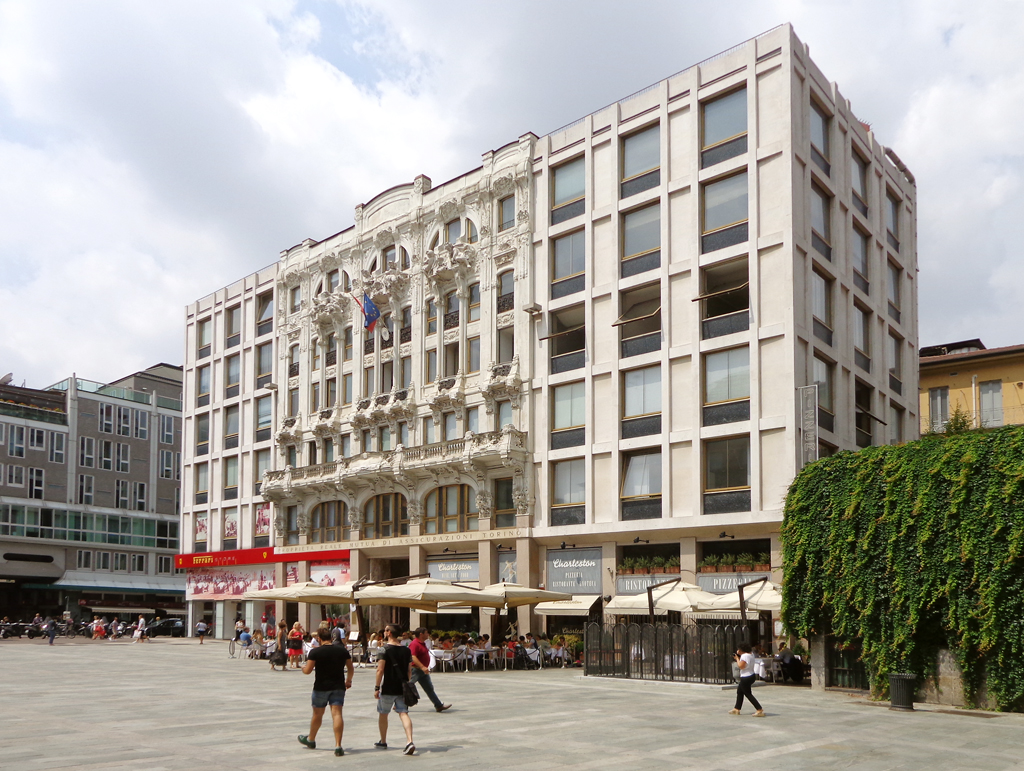
Liberty facade and piazza before creation of amphitheater and fountain

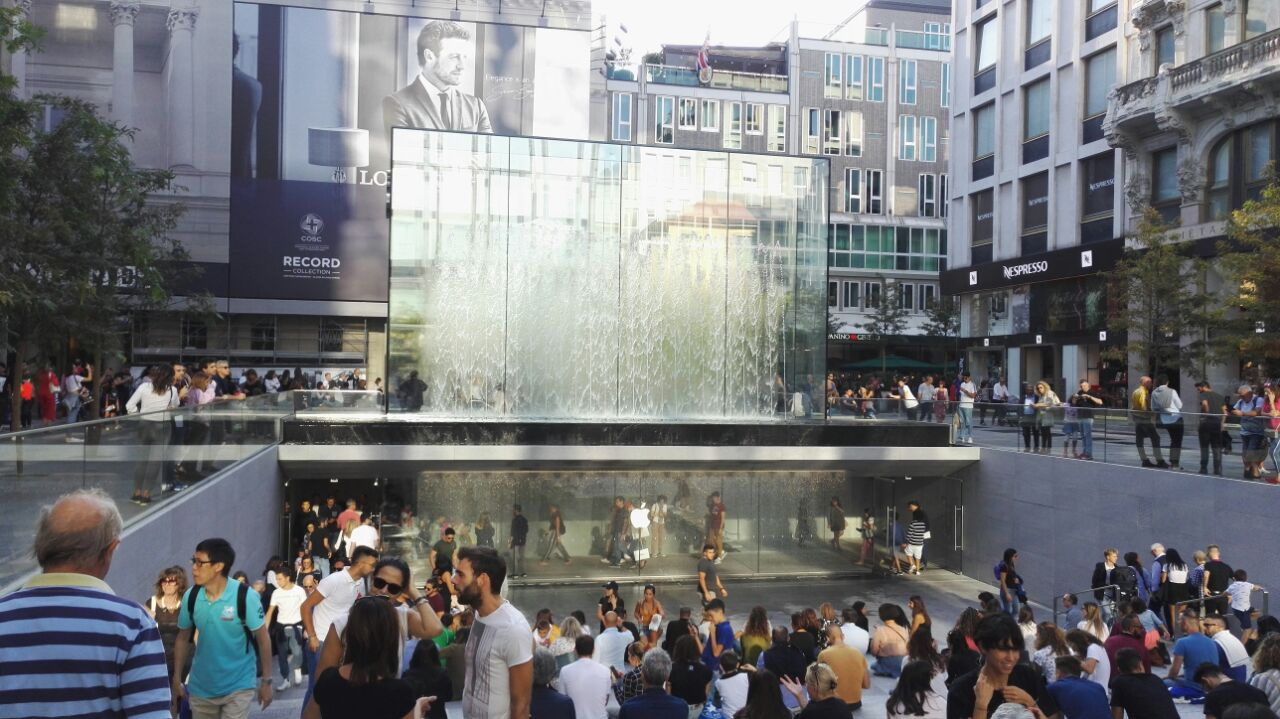
Present piazza and fountain

Piazza del Liberty is a pedestrian square located along Via San Paolo, one block north of the Corso Vittorio Emanuele II, some 3 blocks north east of the Duomo in central Milan, region of Lombardy, Italy. The piazza was created in part in the space after the destruction of the Teatro Milanese during the Allied bombardment in 1943, and takes its name from the Art Nouveau (Liberty style) facade decoration of one of its buildings. It is now complemented by chic shops and modern fountains.

The white marble Liberty style facade of the former Hotel Corso, was designed in 1905 by Angelo Cattaneo and Giacomo Santamaria and erected at a building at nearby Corso Vittorio Emanuele II #15. That building was damaged by the 1943 bombardment, and subsequently demolished. The facade was repurposed for the monumental building or Palazzo della Società Reale Mutua di Assicurazioni Torino, built on the north of the piazza.

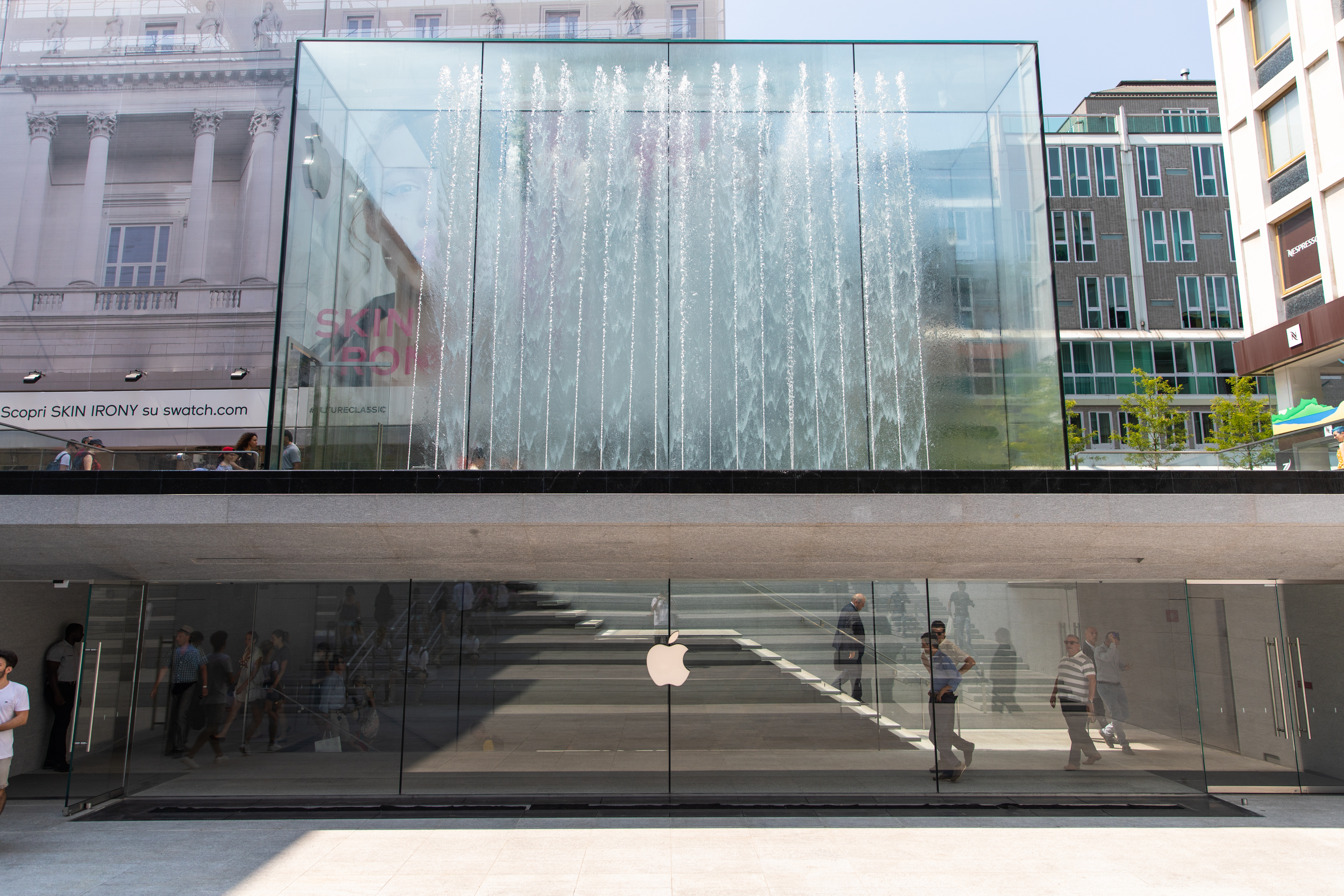
View of Fountain from amphitheater

Beneath the piazza in 1959 was built an underground theater; the piazza was reconstructed in 2018 by the designs of Norman Foster with a modern design of a sunken open air stage. At the western end, above he stage is a fountain with a series parallel spouts aimed at tall glass plates. A stairwell, flanked by the mirrored fountains, descends to the modern subterranean Apple store.
