= Niccolò Falsetti =

Italian film director

- Born: 1 June 1987 (age 39); Grosseto, Tuscany, Italy
- Education: Sapienza University of Rome
- Occupations: Film director, screenwriter

Niccolò Falsetti (born 1 June 1987) is an Italian film director and screenwriter.

== Life and career ==
Born in 1987 in Grosseto, Falsetti attended the "Carducci-Ricasoli" classical lyceum. In 2005, he co-founded the street punk band Pegs with his schoolmate Francesco Turbanti, and they performed at numerous concerts within the local hardcore scene. After earning a degree in Forms and Techniques of Entertainment from La Sapienza University of Rome, he lived in London and Berlin, beginning a professional path as a director and screenwriter. Since 2010, he has been a member of the creative collective ZERØ, producing documentaries, short films, advertising campaigns, cross-media projects, and online content.

Falsetti has collaborated with the Manetti Bros. both in cinema and music, working as an operator on the films of the Diabolik trilogy and on the television series Inspector Coliandro, as well as co-directing the music videos for "Duri da battere" by Max Pezzali featuring Nek and Francesco Renga (2017) and "La profondità degli abissi" by Manuel Agnelli (2021).

In 2022, he made his debut as a director with the feature film Margins, produced by Dispàrte, Manetti Bros., and Rai Cinema, and written with childhood friend Turbanti. The film was selected for competition at the International Critics' Week of the 79th Venice Film Festival, where it won the Audience Award. Falsetti received two nominations for Best New Director at the David di Donatello and the Nastri d'Argento awards.

In 2024, he directed Dritti contro il cielo, a documentary that tells the story of the meeting between the CS Lebowski, a self-managed football team from Florence, and young Palestinian refugees from the Shatila camp in Beirut. It premiered as the opening film of the 4th Sentiero Film Factory.

In 2025, Falsetti began production on his second feature film, Caro mondo crudele, shot in Albinia. The film premiered at the 21st Rome Film Festival and was released in October 2026.

== Filmography ==
Film
Year	Title	Notes
2022	Margins	Also writer
2024	Dritti contro il cielo	Documentary
2026	Caro mondo crudele	Also writer

Television series
Year	Title	Network	Notes
TBA	The Good Boss †	Netflix	Completed
