= Zerocalcare =

Italian cartoonist (born 1983)

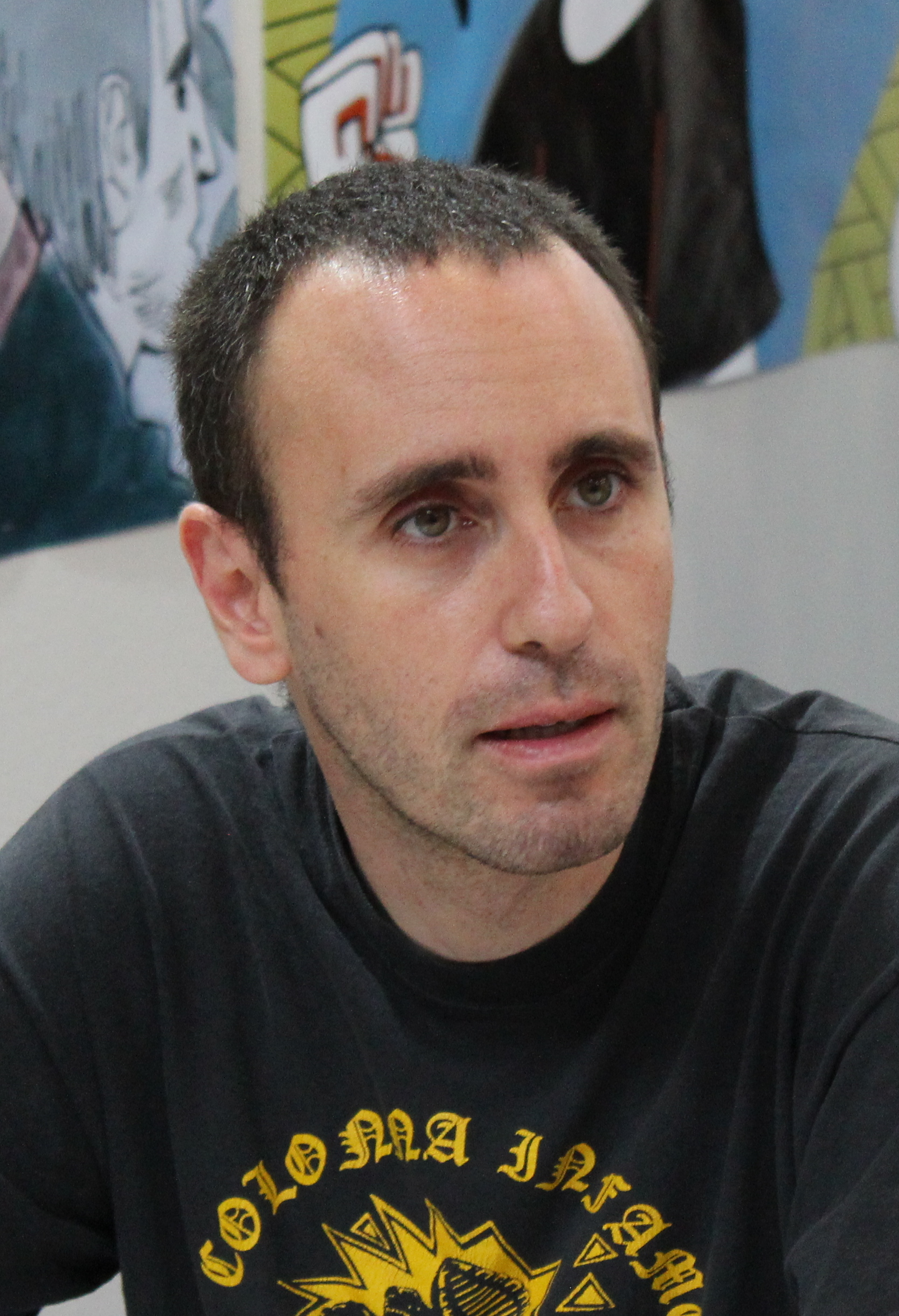
- Zerocalcare at Lucca Comics and Games 2018
- Born: Michele Rech; 12 December 1983 (age 42) Cortona, Italy
- Notable works: The Armadillo Prophecy; Tentacles at My Throat; Forget My Name; My Two Cents; Kobane Calling: Greetings from Northern Syria; Tear Along the Dotted Line; This World Can't Tear Me Down

Michele Rech (Italian: [miˈkɛːle ˈrɛk]; born 12 December 1983), known professionally as Zerocalcare ([ˌdzɛrokalˈkaːre]), is an Italian cartoonist. His pen name, literally meaning "zero limescale", was inspired by an Italian TV commercial jingle for a descaler product, and was chosen when he needed a nickname to quickly join a discussion on the Internet.

As of 2019, his books have sold over one million copies. His works were also adapted in other media, including the 2018 live-action movie The Armadillo Prophecy (Italian: La profezia dell'armadillo), based on the 2011 graphic novel of the same name, and the Netflix animated series Tear Along the Dotted Line (2021), This World Can't Tear Me Down (2023), and My Two Cents (2026), in which he also starred.

== Biography ==
=== Early life ===
Rech was born in Cortona, Italy, to an Italian father from Rome and a French mother. He was raised in France, then later Rome (Rebibbia-Ponte Mammolo area), where he graduated at the Lycée français Chateaubriand.

=== Early career (2003–2012) ===
In 2003, at the age of 20, Rech began working as an illustrator for Liberazione, Carta, La Repubblica, and several other periodicals. At this time, he also wrote and drew a webcomic titled Safe Inside for Zuda Comics, the online division of DC Comics. In 2004 he created a comic about the G8 summit in Genoa, which had taken place three years before.

Zerocalcare published his first graphic novel in October 2011 titled The Armadillo Prophecy, and in November created zerocalcare.it, a website where he published autobiographical comic strips. In September 2012, the blog won the Macchianera Award as 'Best draftsman-Cartoonist' and the Gran Guinigi Award at Lucca Comics for best short story with The Armadillo Prophecy.

=== Career (2013–present) ===
In October 2014, Rech made a variant cover for Marvel's Guardians of the Galaxy, released during Lucca Comics by Panini Comics' Italian division.

In April 2016, his fourth graphic novel Kobane Calling: Greetings from Northern Syria was published. The material had been previously published in 'Internazionale' and focused on the conflict between the Kurds and the Islamic State. Kobane Calling won the Micheluzzi Award as best cartoon at Naples Comicon, 2017. In October, a film based on La profezia dell'armadillo entered production with Fandango (a Fremantle subsidiary) and Rai Cinema. Zerocalcare was one of four screenwriters on the movie.

On 14 January 2018 L'Espresso published a short comic by Zerocalcare titled Questa non è una partita a bocce, focusing on the rise of Neo-fascist movements in Italy. The same year, Zerocalcare was invited to attend San Diego Comic-Con following the English release of Kobane Calling, but only obtained his US Visa last minute, due to his travels which inspired the book.

On 3 September 2018 the film La profezia dell'armadillo was released, based on his comic of the same name. In November, the MAXXI museum of Rome hosted an exhibition of Zerocalcare's works, titled Zerocalcare. Scavare fossati, Nutrire coccodrilli. It lasted until March 2019. That same month a theatrical adaption of Kobane Calling: Greetings from Northern Syria debuted at Teatro del Giglio in Lucca, during Lucca Comics & Games 2019 and toured as part of the 2019/2020 theatre season. In 2020, Zerocalcare got high visibility, particularly thanks to the animated shorts Rebibbia Quarantine broadcast on LA7 on the Propaganda Live program during lockdown due to the COVID-19 pandemic in Italy. On the same year, he made variant covers for Marvel's Absolute Carnage comic book miniseries, only released in Italy. He wrote an introduction for the Italian edition of TRANSito, a transgender-themed comic by Ian Bermúdez drawn by David Cantero, released in Italy in March 2020.

On 21 December 2020, Zerocalcare announced that he would be creating an animated series for Netflix titled Tear Along the Dotted Line. Ten months later, on 8 October 2021, Netflix released a teaser trailer for the show, which announced the show's 17 November 2021 release date. The show premiered ten days later, on 18 October, at the Rome Film Fest. On 16 November Ablaze Publishing announced that they would be releasing English translations of Zerocalcare's first three graphic novels, The Armadillo Prophecy (2011), Tentacles At My Throat (2012) and Forget My Name (2014). Tear Along the Dotted Line was released through Netflix on 17 November 2021. Early reviews have been positive. An animated series featuring the same team of creators, titled This World Can't Tear Me Down (Italian: Questo mondo non mi renderà cattivo), was released on Netflix on 9 June 2023.

On 4 October 2022, Rech's new graphic novel No Sleep till Shengal was published in Italian. It focuses on the persecution of Yazidis in Iraq.

On 1 November 2025, at Lucca Comics & Games 2025, Zerocalcare announced that he would be working on a new series titled My Two Cents (Italian: Due Spicci), which released in May 2026.

== Works ==
=== Comics ===
==== Graphic novels ====
- The Armadillo Prophecy (La profezia dell'armadillo). Edizioni Graficart. 2011.
- Dodici. BAO Publishing. 2013.
- Kobane Calling: Greetings from Northern Syria. Lion Forge Comics. 2017. ISBN 978-19-4130-249-1.
- Macerie prime. BAO Publishing. 2017.
- Macerie prime. Sei mesi dopo. BAO Publishing. 2017.
- ——; R/Push (2018). Prossima fermata. Una storia per Renato. Elementi Kairos.
- Educazione subatomica. CNR Edizioni. 2018.
- Tentacles At My Throat (Un polpo alla gola). Europe Comics. 2018. ISBN 978-16-8497-092-6.
- A Babbo morto. Una storia di Natale. BAO Publishing. 2020.
- Scheletri. BAO Publishing. 2020.
- Forget My Name (Dimentica il mio nome). Ablaze Publishing. 2022. ISBN 978-19-5091-272-8.
- No Sleep till Shengal. BAO Publishing. 2022.
- Quando muori resta a me. BAO Publishing. 2024.

==== Short Comics ====
- Sparare a zero. Best Movie. 24 September 2014–present.
- "'Se Zerocalcare avesse scelto un panda anziché un armadillo?". Bevilacqua, Giacomo (2015). A Panda piace fare i fumetti degli altri. Panini Comics. ISBN 978-88-9120-954-2.
  - Se Zerocalcare avesse scelto un panda anziché un armadillo? Bevilacqua, Giacomo (2023). Sono una testa di panda. BAO Publishing. ISBN 978-88-3273-933-6.
- La città del decoro (Città dei Puffi). La Repubblica. 10 May 2015.
- Ferro e piume. Internazionale. 2 October 2015.
- Kobane Calling. Internazionale. 2 October 2015. ISSN 1122-2832
- Groviglio. La Repubblica. 2016. 24 December 2016.
- Così passi dalla parte del torto. in La rabbia. Einaudi Stile Libero Extra. 2016. ISBN 978-88-0623-093-7.
- Questa non è una partita a bocce. L'Espresso. 14 January 2018.
- C'è un quartiere che resiste. Internazionale. 29 March 2019.
- Macelli. Internazionale. 19 July 2019.
- Lontano dagli occhi, lontano dal cuore. Internazionale Extra. December 2020.
- Romanzo sanitario. l'Espresso. 28 March 2021.
- La dittatura immaginaria. Internazionale. 14 May 2021.
- Etichette. Internazionale. 16 July 2021.
- Dubbi confusi su un presente lacerato Parte 1. l'Essenziale. 6 November 2021.
- Dubbi confusi su un presente lacerato Parte 2. l'Essenziale. 13 November 2021.
- Dubbi confusi su un presente lacerato Parte 3. l'Essenziale. 30 November 2021.
- Strati. l'Essenziale. 19 February 2022.
- La voragine. l'Essenziale. 5 December 2022.
  - La voragine. Internazionale. 9 December 2022.
- Cortocircuito. Appunti e cronistoria della vicenda Lucca Comics. www.internazionale.net. 2023.
  - The Chasm (La voragine). April 2023.
- ''Regà non ho capito''. Scottecs Gigazine. Gigaciao. 5 July 2023. ISBN 979-12-8150-200-0.
  - Cortocircuito. Appunti e cronistoria della vicenda Lucca Comics. Internazionale. 10 November 2023.
- In fondo al pozzo. Una storia di nazisti, galera e responsabilità. Internazionale n. 1545. 12 January 2024.
- Questa notte non sarà breve. Internazionale n. 1553-1556. 8 March 2024 – 29 March 2024.
- Una giornata a Budapest. Diario di un'udienza del processo a Ilaria Salis. Internazionale n. 1557. 5 April 2024.
- Non è risolto niente. Internazionale n. 1566. 7 June 2024.
- La foresta contro il deserto. Una storia di quartiere che parla di tutto il mondo. Internazionale n. 1603, 28 February 2025.
- Antonio. La fine del mondo n. 0, December 2025-.

==== Collections ====
- Ogni maledetto lunedì su due. BAO Publishing. 2013.
  - Collects the 2011–2013 'zerocalcare.it' strips, as well as a new 50 page comic.
- L'elenco telefonico degli accolli. BAO Publishing. 2015.
  - Second collection of 'zerocalcare.it' strips from 2014–2015, as well a new 45-page comic.
- La scuola di pizze in faccia del professor Calcare. BAO Publishing. 2019.
  - Collects short comics published between 10 May 2015 – 22 February 2019, as well as a new comic divided into three parts.
- Niente di nuovo sul fronte di Rebibbia. BAO Publishing. 2021.
  - Collects short comics from 2019–2021, as well as a new comic divided into five parts.
- Nel nido dei serpenti. BAO Publishing. 2025.
  - Collects short comics from 2022–2025, as well as a 112 pages new comic

=== Essays and critique ===
- Pavan, Sara, ed. (2014). Il potere sovversivo della carta. Milan: Agenzia X. ISBN 978-88-9502-974-0.
- De Finis, Giorgio; Di Noto, Irene (2020). Senza Metropoliz non è la mia città. Rome: Bordeaux Edizioni. ISBN 978-88-3210-398-4.
- Satrapi, Marjane, ed. (2023). Donna, vita, libertà. Milan: Rizzoli. ISBN 978-88-1718-348-2.
- V.V.A.A. (2023). Pensare l’impensabile, tentare l’impossibile. A fianco di Alfredo, contro ergastolo e 41 bis. Milan: Colibrì Edizioni. ISBN 978-88-9720-699-6.

=== Forewords ===
- Rojava Calling (2016). Kobane, diario di una resistenza: Racconti di una staffetta di solidarietà (Sulla frontiera). Rome: Edizioni Alegre. ISBN 978-88-9884-117-2.
- Ian Bermúdez Raventós; David Cantero Berenguer (2020). TRANSito. Rome: Momo Edizioni. ISBN 978-88-9446-246-3.

=== Cover arts ===
- Bendis, Brian Michael. McNiven, Steve. Dell, John (October 2014). Guardians of the Galaxy #0. Colored by Justin Ponsor. Panini Comics. (variant).
- Luna Gualano. Go Home - A Casa Loro. October 2018.
- Max Pezzali. In questa città. Warner Music Italy. November 2019.
- Cates, Donny (January 2020). Absolute Carnage. Drawn by Ryan Stegman. Modena: Panini Comics.(variant)
- Thomas, Jeffrey Miley; Venturini, Federico, eds. (February 2020). La vostra libertà e la mia. Abdullah Öcalan e la questione curda nella Turchia di Erdogan. Milan: Edizioni Punto Rosso. ISBN 978-88-8351-238-4.
- Max Pezzali. Sembro matto. Warner Music Italy. March 2020.
- Young, Skottie (October 2020). Middlewest. Vol.1. Drawn by Jorge Corona. Milan: BAO Publishing. September 2020. ISBN 978-88-3273-456-0. (variant)
- Bevilacqua, Giacomo (October 2022). Metamorphosis. Milan: BAO Publishing. ISBN 978-88-3273-754-7. (variant)
- Beritan, Rojbin; Cruciati, Chiara (November 2022). La montagna sola. Gli ezidi e l'autonomia democratica di Şengal. Rome: Edizioni Alegre. ISBN 978-88-3206-783-5.
- Floris, Francesco; Pallavicini, Carlo (March 2023). La muraglia umana. Le lotte dei facchini nella logistica. Rome: Momo Edizioni. ISBN 979-12-8029-836-2.
- Rossi, Ilaria (May 2020). Prospettiva Quadraro. Qual è la libertà?. Arezzo: Setteponti. ISBN 979-12-8100-514-3.
- Templeton, Ty, Medina, Paco, Slott, Dan (April 2024). Spider-Boy #1. Panini Comics, (variant).
- V.V.A.A. (November 2024). Il più grande attacco alla libertà di protesta della storia repubblicana italiana. Rome: Momo Edizioni. ISBN 979-12-80298-66-9.

=== Other ===
- Scavare fossati, nutrire coccodrilli. BAO Publishing. 2018. ISBN 978-88-3273-210-8.
- Dopo il botto. BAO Publishing. 2023. ISBN 978-88-3273-836-0.
- Zerocalcare Animation Art Book. BAO Publishing. 2023. ISBN 978-88-3273-906-0.
- Enciclopedia calcarea. Guida ragionata all’universo di Zerocalcare. BAO Publishing. 2023. ISBN 978-88-3273-931-2.

== Filmography ==
Year	Title	Director(s)	Credit	Notes
2014	Fumettology: Zerocalcare	Unknown	Self	Documentary TV Episode
2015	ARF!: Il film	Giovanni Bufalini	Self	Documentary
2018	La profezia dell'armadillo	Emanuele Scaringi	Screenplay	Based on Zerocalcare's 'The Armadillo Prophecy'.
2019	Basement Café: Kaos & Zerocalcare	Paolo Vari	Self	Talk Show
2020	Liberi e pensanti. Uno maggio Taranto	Fabrizio Fichera, Giorgio Testi & Francesco Zippel	Self	Documentary
2020	Rebibbia Quarantine	Zerocalcare	Director, writer, animator, self	Series of twelve shorts
2021	Tear Along the Dotted Line	Zerocalcare	Director, writer, self	Six-episode limited series for Netflix
2022	Margins	Niccolò Falsetti	Self	Cameo role; poster author
2023	This World Can't Tear Me Down	Zerocalcare	Director, writer, self	Six-episode limited series for Netflix
2026	My 2 Cents	Zerocalcare	Director, writer, executive producer, self	Eight-episode limited series for Netflix
2026	Caro mondo crudele	Niccolò Falsetti	Character designer	Feature film

== Awards and nominations ==
Awards

- 2009: Zuda Comics Competition of January 2009 for Safe Inside.
- 2012:
  - Macchianera Italian Awards as 'Best draftsman-Cartoonist'.
  - XL Award for The Armadillo Prophecy.
  - Micheluzzi Award for the 'best webcomic' for zerocalcare.it.
- 2013:
  - XL Award and Micheluzzi Award for the 'best comic book' for Tentacles at My Throat.
  - 'Archivio Disarmo - Colombe d'Oro per la Pace' Journalistic Award.
  - Lucca Comics & Games' Gran Guinigi Award for the 'best short story' for The Armadillo Prophecy.
- 2014: 'Satira politica di Forte dei Marmi' Award for the best 'satirical drawing'.
- 2017: Micheluzzi Award for the 'best short story' for Kobane Calling: Greetings From Northern Syria, on Internazionale n°1085.
- 2018: Mondadori Public Award during the Micheluzzi Awards for Forget My Name.
- 2021: Fabrique Award for the 'best TV series' for Tear Along the Dotted Line
- 2023:
  - Terzani Prize for No Sleep Till Shengal
  - Feltrinelli Prize for arts

Nominations

- Finalist at the Strega Prize in the 'young' category for Forget My Name.
- Finalist at the Québec Libraries Prize for Forget My Name.
