= The Strumbellas =

Canadian band

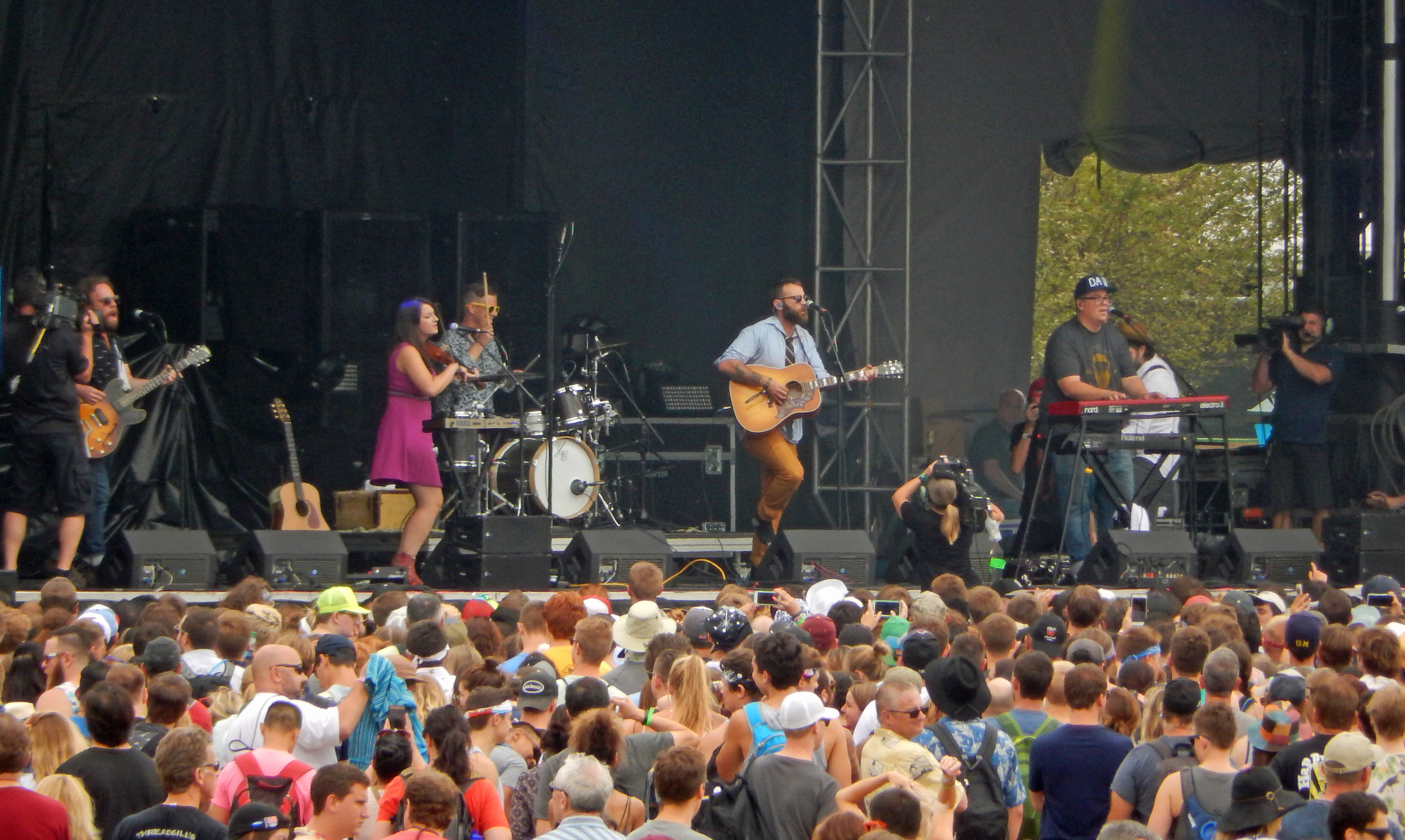

Background information
- Origin: Lindsay, Ontario, Canada
- Genres: Indie rock; alternative country; folk rock; folk pop
- Years active: 2008–present
- Labels: Six Shooter; Glassnote; Universal
- Members: David Ritter; Jon Hembrey; Isabel Ritchie; Darryl James; Jimmy Chauveau; Simon Ward
- Past members: Jeremy Drury; James Oliver
- Website: www.thestrumbellas.ca

The Strumbellas are a Canadian rock band from Lindsay, Ontario, formed in 2008. Their music has been described as alternative country, indie rock, and gothic folk.

== History ==
Formed in 2008 in Toronto, Ontario, the band's original lineup consisted of songwriter Simon Ward on vocals and guitar, David Ritter on vocals and keys, Jon Hembrey on lead guitar, Isabel Ritchie on violin, Darryl James on bass guitar, and Jeremy Drury on drums. Hembrey, James, Drury, and Ward are all originally from Lindsay, Ontario, while Ritter and Ritchie joined after Ward posted a call for additional musicians to Craigslist.

The band's self-titled EP was released in 2009, garnering numerous positive reviews and coverage in many different media outlets; stating them as a band to watch. Their Southern Souls video by Mitch Fillion received attention from many bloggers and awarded them an ongoing Monday night residency at Toronto's Cameron House.

In 2010, the band was invited to play landmark venues including Yonge-Dundas Square (now Sankofa Square), the Horseshoe Tavern and the Peterborough Folk Festival. Their full-length debut album, My Father and the Hunter, was released independently in 2012, and recorded at Metalworks Studios in Mississauga, Ontario. It was nominated for a 2013 Juno Award in the Juno Award for Roots & Traditional Album of the Year – Group category.

The band later signed with Six Shooter Records, releasing their second album, We Still Move on Dance Floors, in 2013. The album was produced by Ryan Hadlock. We Still Move on Dance Floors won a 2014 Juno Award in the Juno Award for Roots & Traditional Album of the Year – Group category. After winning the Juno award, frontman Simon Ward expressed his distress after realizing that the live feed of the band's acceptance speech was cut off due to technical difficulties.

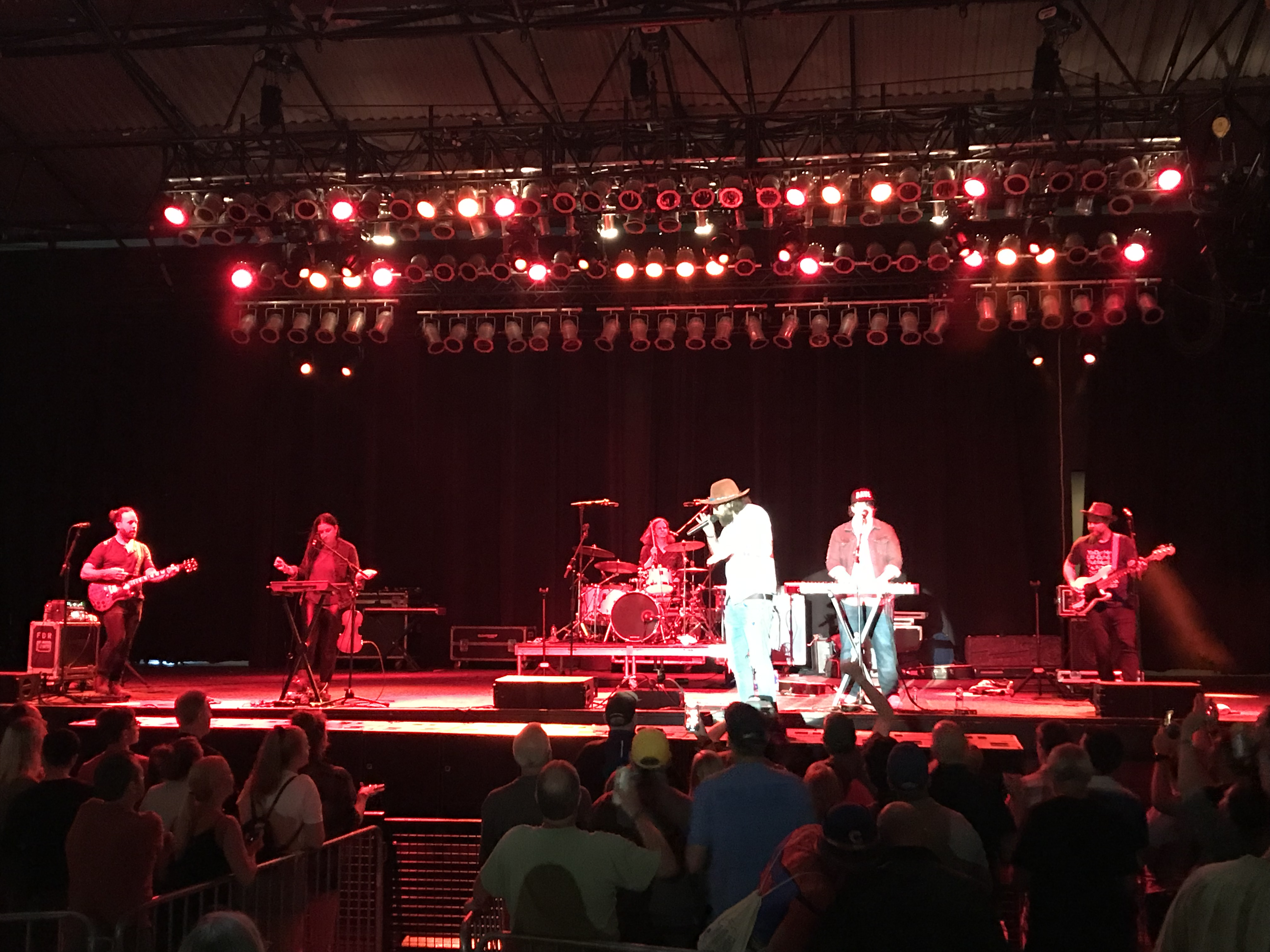
The Strumbellas performing at Summerfest in 2019.

The band's third studio album, Hope, was released on April 22, 2016. The first single from that album, "Spirits", topped the Billboard Alternative Songs chart the last two weeks of May 2016 and also enjoyed significant mainstream radio play in Canada and a number of European countries. On April 21, 2016, the band were featured performers on The Late Show with Stephen Colbert, closing out the episode with a live performance of "Spirits". They also performed at the NHL Heritage Classic in Winnipeg during the first intermission on October 23, 2016.

The band began an international tour in the summer of 2016, continuing throughout 2017 in Australia, Europe, and North America including festivals such as Bonnaroo and Governor's Ball. The band's song "Spirits" won the 2017 Juno Award for Single of the Year.

The band's fourth studio album, Rattlesnake, was released on March 29, 2019. On April 3, 2019, the band performed the album's first single, "Salvation", on Late Night with Seth Meyers.

In September 2019, the Liberal Party of Canada adopted the band's song "One Hand Up", which originally appeared on Rattlesnake, as their campaign anthem for Prime Minister Justin Trudeau's campaign. The deal included the band producing another version of the song in French. The French version was believed by some to have been Google Translated from English to French, and while the band did not confirm or deny the report, they did record a new version of the song.

In March 2022, the band announced on Instagram that Ward had transitioned into a behind-the-scenes role in order to focus on his family and songwriting. Jimmy Chauveau replaced Ward as the band's vocalist.

On October 4, 2023, The Strumbellas released their first single in two years, "Hold Me". The band also announced a new album, Part Time Believer, which was released on February 9, 2024.

On April 4, 2025, The Strumbellas played a US tour in support of their new album Part Time Believer. On 18 July 2025, the band released the single "Hard Lines". They followed up the single with the song "Maybe It's Me." On October 21, they released the EP Burning Bridges Into Dust.

== Members ==
=== Current members ===
- David Ritter – keyboards, banjo (2008–present)
- Darryl James – bass guitar (2008–present)
- Isabel Ritchie – violin, keyboards (2008–present)
- Jon Hembrey – lead guitar, acoustic guitar (2008–present)
- Jimmy Chauveau – lead vocals, acoustic guitar (2022–present)
- Simon Ward – lead vocals, acoustic guitar (2008–2022), composer (2022–present)

=== Touring member ===
- Miles Gibbons – drums, composer (2022–present)

=== Past members ===
- Jeremy Drury – drums (2008–2022)
- James Oliver – banjo, ukulele, vocals, piano (2010–2012)

== Discography ==
=== Studio albums ===
List of studio albums, with selected chart positions
Title	Album details	Peak chart positions										Certifications
Title	Album details	CAN	BEL (FL)	BEL (WA)	ITA	SWI	UK Amer.	US	US Folk	US Indie	US Rock	Certifications
My Father and the Hunter	Released: February 21, 2012; Label: Fontana North	—	—	—	—	—	—	—	—	—	—	
We Still Move on Dance Floors	Released: October 22, 2013; Label: Six Shooter	—	—	—	—	—	—	—	— (Note: We Still Move on Dance Floors did not enter the US Americana/Folk Albums charts, but peaked at number 9 on the US Bluegrass Album Chart.)	—	—	
Hope	Released: April 22, 2016; Label: Glassnote	3	129	143	47	68	25	98	3	—	12	MC: Platinum
Rattlesnake	Released: March 29, 2019; Label: Glassnote	56	—	—	—	—	—	— (Note: Rattlesnake did not enter the US Billboard 200, but peaked at number 96 on the US Top Current Album Sales Chart.)	—	19	—	
Part Time Believer	Released: February 9, 2024; Label: Underneath a Mountain	—	—	—	—	—	—	—	—	—	—	
"—" denotes a recording that did not chart or was not released in that territory.

=== EPs ===
- The Strumbellas (2009)
- Burning Bridges into Dust (2025)

=== Singles ===
==== As lead artist ====
Title	Year	Peak chart positions										Certifications	Album
Title	Year	CAN	CAN Rock	AUT	BEL (FL)	BEL (WA)	FRA	ITA	SWI	US Bub.	US Rock	Certifications	Album
"Spirits"	2016	23	2	5	4	5	64	11	18	9	7	MC: 5× Platinum; BEA: Gold; BPI: Silver; BVMI: Platinum; FIMI: 3× Platinum; RIAA: Platinum; SNEP: Gold	Hope
"We Don't Know"	2016	— (Note: "We Don't Know" did not enter the Billboard Canadian Hot 100, but peaked at number 28 on the Canada Emerging Artists chart.)	9	—	— (Note: "We Don't Know" did not enter the Flanders Ultratop 50, but peaked at number 10 on the Ultratip chart.)	—	—	—	—	—	40	MC: Gold	Hope
"Young & Wild"	2017	—	41	—	—	—	—	—	—	—	—		Hope
"Salvation"	2018	— (Note: "Salvation" did not enter the Billboard Canadian Hot 100, but peaked at number 23 on the Canadian All-format Airplay chart.)	10	—	—	— (Note: "Salvation" did not enter the Wallonie Ultratop 50, but peaked at number 39 on the Ultratip chart.)	—	—	—	—	— (Note: "Salvation" did not enter the Billboard Hot Rock & Alternative Songs chart, but peaked at number 28 on the Rock & Alternative Airplay chart.)	MC: Gold	Rattlesnake
"I'll Wait"	2019	—	36	—	—	—	—	—	—	—	— (Note: "I'll Wait" did not enter the Billboard Hot Rock & Alternative Songs chart, but peaked at number 37 on the Alternative Airplay chart.)		Rattlesnake
"Greatest Enemy"	2021	—	20	—	—	—	—	—	—	—	— (Note: "Greatest Enemy" did not enter the Billboard Hot Rock & Alternative Songs chart, but peaked at number 47 on the Rock & Alternative Airplay chart.)		Non-album single
"Hold Me"	2023	—	37	—	—	—	—	—	—	—	—		Part Time Believer
"Running Out of Time"	2023	—	—	—	—	—	—	—	—	—	—		Part Time Believer
"Hard Lines"	2025	—	37	—	—	—	—	—	—	—	—		Burning Bridges into Dust
"Come Back Around"	2026	—	32	—	—	—	—	—	—	—	—		Burning Bridges into Dust
"—" denotes releases that did not chart or were not released in that region.

==== Promotional singles ====
Title	Year	Album
"Soup"	2019	Non-album single
"Maybe It's Me"	2025	Burning Bridges into Dust
"Skin of My Teeth"	2025	Burning Bridges into Dust

== Awards and nominations ==
Year	Award	Category	Recipient/Work	Result	Ref
2013	Juno Awards	Roots & Traditional Album of the Year: Group	The Strumbellas	Nominated	
2014	Juno Awards	Roots & Traditional Album of the Year: Group	The Strumbellas	Won	
2016	MuchMusic Video Award	Best Rock/Alternative Video	"Spirits"	Won	
2017	iHeartRadio Music Awards	Best New Artist	The Strumbellas	Nominated	
2017	iHeartRadio Music Awards	Alternative Rock Artist of the Year	The Strumbellas	Nominated	
2017	iHeartRadio Music Awards	Best New Rock/Alternative Rock Artist	The Strumbellas	Won	
2017	Juno Awards	Group of the Year	The Strumbellas	Nominated	
2017	Juno Awards	Fan Choice Award	The Strumbellas	Nominated	
2017	Juno Awards	Single of the Year	"Spirits"	Won	
2017	Canadian Radio Music Awards	Best New Group or Solo Artist: Mainstream AC	"Spirits"	Nominated	
2017	Canadian Radio Music Awards	Best New Group or Solo Artist: CHR	"Spirits"	Nominated	
2017	Canadian Radio Music Awards	Best New Group or Solo Artist: Hot AC	"Spirits"	Nominated	
2017	Canadian Radio Music Awards	Best New Group or Solo Artist: Mainstream Rock	"Spirits"	Won	
2017	Canadian Radio Music Awards	Best New Group or Solo Artist: Modern Rock	"Spirits"	Won	
2017	Canadian Radio Music Awards	Factor Breakthrough Artist	"Spirits"	Won	
2017	Canadian Independent Music Awards	Single of the Year	"We Don't Know"	Won	
2017	Canadian Independent Music Awards	Songwriter of the Year	"Spirits" & "We Don't Know"	Won	

== See also ==
- Music of Canada
- List of bands from Canada
- List of Canadian musicians
