= Alberto Camerini =

Italian singer-songwriter and musician (born 1951)

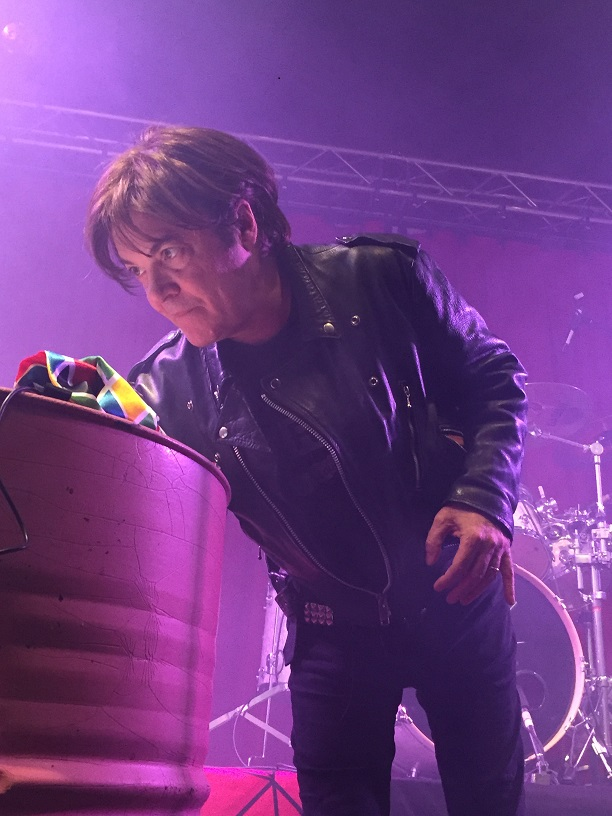
- Born: 16 May 1951 (age 75); São Paulo, Brazil
- Occupation: singer-songwriter

Alberto Camerini (born 16 May 1951) is an Italian singer-songwriter and musician, who was commercially most active during the late-1970s and early-1980s.

== Life and career ==
Alberto Camerini was born in São Paulo, Brazil from Italian Jewish parents who had moved to South America a few years earlier. His parents moved back to Milan when Alberto was 11 years old. Camerini enrolled at the University of Milan, where he became friends with Eugenio Finardi, who introduced him to music; together with Eugenio Finardi, Camerini started two bands, Il Pacco and L'Enorme Maria. Camerini became a proficient guitarist and he later did session work for musicians such as Patty Pravo, Stormy Six, Fausto Leali and Eugenio Finardi himself.

Camerini started his solo career in 1976, with the single "Pane quotidiano" and three albums that proposed an original mix between rock and Brazilian music. In the eighties Camerini initiated a successful collaboration with lyrics author and record producer Roberto Colombo. Inspired by the krautrock movement that was dominant in Europe at the time, Camerini had a significant commercial success with a number of synthpop hits, particularly with the songs "Rock 'n' Roll Robot" and "Tanz bambolina". In 1984 Camerini participated to the Sanremo Music Festival where he finished 16th. Following the lukewarm reception to his 1986 album Angeli in Blue Jeans, Camerini took a break from music for about a decade. In 1995 Camerini reprised his career and recorded the album Dove l'arcobaleno arriva.

== Discography ==
=== Selected singles ===
- 1976 – "Pane quotidiano"
- 1977 – "Gelato metropolitano"
- 1978 – "Sciocka"
- 1980 – "Sintonizzati con me"
- 1980 – "Serenella"
- 1981 – "Rock 'n' roll robot"
- 1982 – "Tanz bambolina"
- 1982 – "Questo amore"
- 1983 – "Computer capriccio"
- 1984 – "La bottega del caffè"
- 1986 – "Va bene così"

=== Studio albums ===
- 1976 – Cenerentola e il pane quotidiano
- 1977 – Gelato metropolitano
- 1978 – Comici cosmetici
- 1980 – Alberto Camerini
- 1981 – Rudy e Rita
- 1982 – Rockmantico
- 1986 – Angeli in blue jeans
- 1995 – Dove l'arcobaleno arriva
- 2001 – Cyberclown
- 2005 – Kids Wanna Rock
