= L'Universale =

2016 Italian comedy film

- Film poster
- Directed by: Federico Micali
- Written by: Cosimo Calamini; Federico Micali; Heidrun Schleef
- Starring: Francesco Turbanti; Matilda Lutz; Robin Mugnaini
- Cinematography: David Becheri
- Music by: Bandabardò
- Release date: April 3, 2016 (Bari Film Festival)
- Running time: 88 minutes
- Country: Italy
- Language: Italian

L'Universale is a 2016 Italian comedy film directed by Federico Micali.

The film is set in Florence, Tuscany during the 1970s and is centered on the story of the popular Cinema Universale in Oltrarno.

== Cast ==
- Francesco Turbanti as Tommaso
- Matilda Lutz as Alice
- Robin Mugnaini as Marcello
- Claudio Bigagli as Luciano Nencioni
- Paolo Hendel as Riccardo Ginori
- Maurizio Lombardi as Egisto Tamburini
- Anna Meacci as Franchina
- Vauro Senesi as Ivo Tanturli
- Margherita Vicario as Camilla
- Ilaria Cristini as Silvana
- Luca Guastini as Marco Calamassi
- Francesco Mancini as Buio
- Pietro Angelini as Dimitri
- Enrico Greppi as Ganesio
