= Kobane Calling =

Comic book by Zerocalcare

- Created by: Zerocalcare
- Original language: Italian
- Genre: Action/adventure
- Publication date: 2015

Creative team
- Writer(s): Zerocalcare

Kobane Calling, titled Kobane Calling: Greetings from Northern Syria in the English edition, is a comic illustrated book written and designed by the Italian author Zerocalcare. Part of the work was published in January 2015 on Internazionale, an Italian weekly.

The work is a graphic reportage of the journey that Zerocalcare took to Syrian Kurdistan and the Syria–Turkey border, a few kilometers far from the besieged city of Kobanî, among the Kurdish leftist defenders of democratic autonomous region of Rojava, where its people have been fighting against the forces of the Islamic State.

== Plot ==
In the first part of the comic, Zerocalcare recounts the reasons that pushed him to go to the small town of Mehser, on the Turkish-Syrian border, a short distance from the besieged city of Kobanî, which is the symbol of the independence of the Rojava autonomous region, mainly Kurdish populated, and has fought against the forces of the Islamic State.

The illustrator humorously recounts the results of the announcement made to his parents of his departure towards Kobanî, with a group of Roman volunteers to support the Kurdish resistance and objectively narrate the conflict with first-hand testimonies. The arrival and permanence are then dashed in the cartoons with humor and digressions typical of the Zerocalcare style but with a critical spirit towards the contradictions with which the interventions are conducted internationally and a very strong emotional involvement towards the known people and volunteers.

== Adaptations ==
=== Stage play ===
On November 2, 2018, Kobane Calling On Stage, the first ever theatrical adaptation of the original graphic novel Kobane Calling, debuted at the Teatro del Giglio in Lucca, Italy, during the Lucca Comics & Games convention. The play is directed by Nicola Zavagli, while Zerocalcare is portrayed by the actor Lorenzo Parrotto. The show was on tour in Italy during the 2019–2020 season, and has been resumed during the 2022–2023 season, starting from the Teatro Bellini in Naples in May 2022.

=== Audiobook ===
An audiobook edition in Italian was released in October 2021, exclusively on Storytel.
