= Francesco Turbanti =

Italian actor (born 1988)

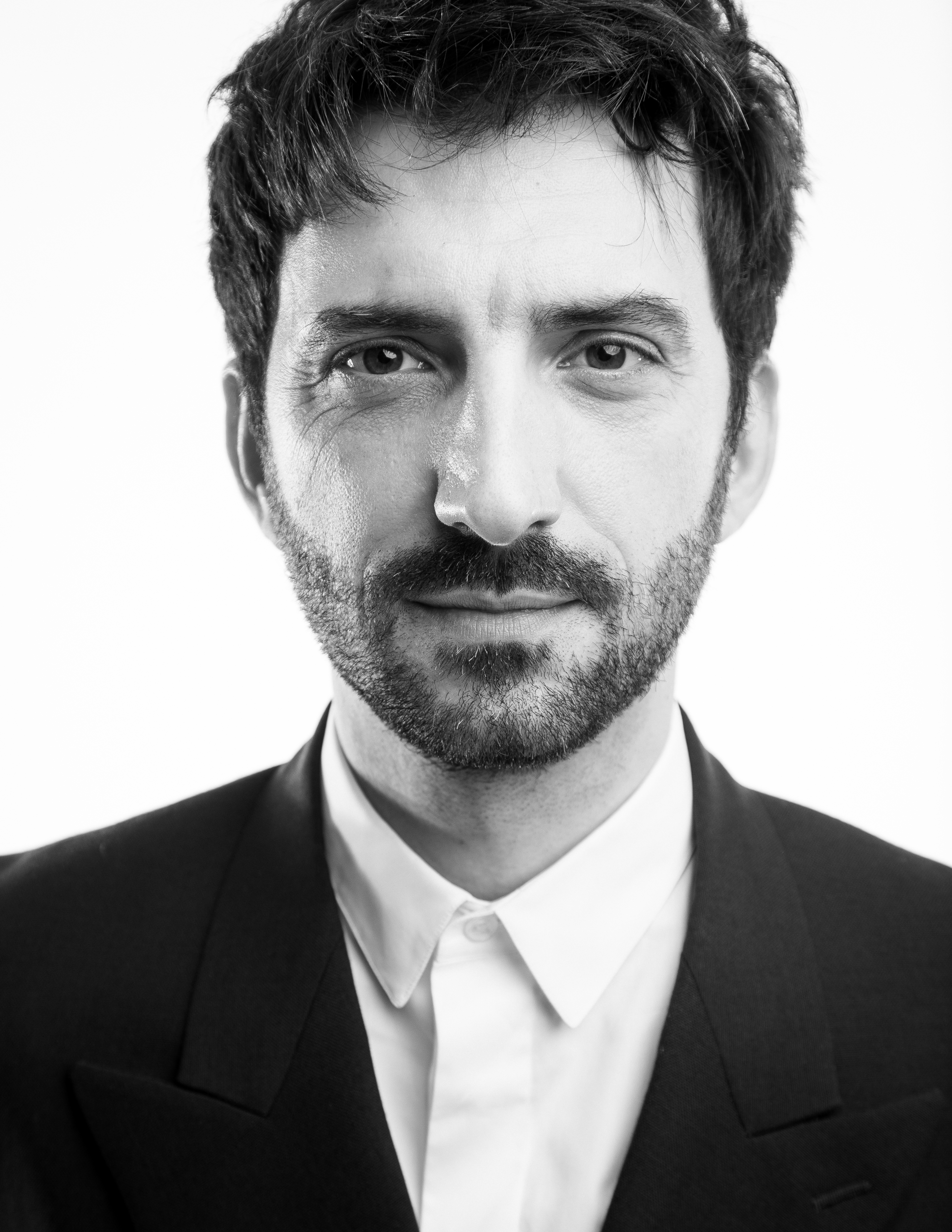
- Turbanti in 2024
- Born: 20 January 1988 (age 38); Grosseto, Italy
- Occupations: Actor, screenwriter
- Years active: 2011–present

Francesco Turbanti (born 20 January 1988) is an Italian actor and screenwriter.

== Career ==
Born in Grosseto, after his studies he moved to Rome, graduating at the theatre school "Teatro Azione" in 2008. He began his acting career in the Roman stages and debuted in 2011 with his first feature film, The First on the List, in the main role of Renzo Lulli. For the role he won the LARA special prize for best newcomer at the Rome International Film Festival.

He also played the lead in the comedy films Three Days Later (2013) and L'Universale (2016), and appeared in secondary roles in Steel (2012) by Stefano Mordini and Rainbow: A Private Affair (2017) by Paolo and Vittorio Taviani. In 2019, he joined the ensemble cast of Parents in Progress, alongside Anna Foglietta, Paolo Calabresi, Lucia Mascino and Elena Radonicich.

In 2022, he is the co-writer and protagonist of Margins, which premiered at the International Critics' Week of the 79th Venice International Film Festival.

He starred as Joachim of Fiore in the 2024 film Joachim and the Apocalypse by Jordan River.

== Filmography ==
Film
Year	Title	Role	Notes
2011	The First on the List	Renzo Lulli	
2012	Steel	Mattia	
2013	Three Days Later	Matteo	
2016	L'Universale	Tommaso	
2016	The Invisible Player	Lorenzo	
2017	Rainbow: A Private Affair	Cobra	
2019	Parents in Progress	Paolo Lanucci	
2022	Io e Spotty	Riccardo	
2022	Margins	Michele	Also writer
2023	Diabolik: Who Are You?	Loris	
2024	Joachim and the Apocalypse	Joachim of Fiore	
2026	No Place to Be Single	Duccio	
2026	Caro mondo crudele	Alberto Vitali	Also writer

Television
Year	Title	Role	Notes
2020	Murders at Barlume	Drug dealer	Episode "Donne con le palle"
2021	Inspector Coliandro	Giacomini	TV series; episode "Kabir Bedi"
2026	Ligas	Emilio	TV series; 3 episodes
