= Rock 'n' Roll Robot =

Single by Alberto Camerini

from the album Rudy e Rita
- B-side: "Miele"
- Released: 1981
- Length: 3:24
- Label: CBS
- Songwriter: Alberto Camerini
- Producer: 776440

Alberto Camerini singles chronology
"Serenella" (1980)	"Rock 'n' Roll Robot" (1981)	"Tanz bambolina" (1982)

Audio
- "Rock 'n' Roll Robot" on YouTube

"Rock 'n' Roll Robot" is a 1981 Italian song by Alberto Camerini from her album Rudy e Rita.

== Overview ==
The song marked the commercial breakout of Camerini, and his transition from alternative rocker to easy-listening synthpop singer. To promote the song, he created the character of "Arlecchino elettronico" ('Electronic Harlequin'), performing it dressed as Harlequin and incorporating movements inspired by puppets and robots.

The song has been described as having "a vibrant, sharp, and crowd-pleasing sound, with delightfully nonsensical lyrics, accompanied by performances that are as memorable as they are improbable". Renzo Stefanel from Rockit described the song as "easy melodies and harmonic progressions that recall the simplicity of doo-wop, showcasing a '50s progression combined with technological sounds that exude both attraction and existential angst toward what was considered the emerging robotic and computerized era". He also highlighted the song's success among younger audiences, stating that "Camerini brought together a generation of pre-teens like no one had ever done before in Italy".

== Track listing ==
No.	Title	Writer(s)	Length
1.	"Rock 'n' Roll Robot"	Camerini	3:10
2.	"Miele"	Camerini	2:47

== Charts ==
Chart performance for "Rock 'n' Roll Robot"
Chart (1981)	Peak position
Italy (Musica e dischi)	3
