= Sergio Albelli =

Italian actor (born 1965)

Sergio Albelli (born 5 October 1965, in Pescia) is an Italian actor, best known for his roles in the films Captain Corelli's Mandolin (2001), Miracle at St. Anna (2008), The First Beautiful Thing (2010), and the television series Leonardo (2021–present), and Anna (2021–present).
