= Dalia Colli =

Italian make-up artist

- Born: 23 May 1976 (age 49); Livorno, Italy
- Occupation: Make-up artist

Dalia Colli (born 23 May 1976) is an Italian make-up artist.

== Life and career ==
Born in Livorno, Colli studied at the Accademia di Belle Arti di Firenze and at the Accademia di Belle Arti di Roma. She made her professional debut as assistant of Paola Gattabrusi, and in 2001 she worked as a prosthetic moulder and sculptor in the workshop of Vittorio Sodano.

During her career she was awarded three David di Donatello and a European Film Award for Dogman. In 2021 she was nominated for the Academy Award for Best Makeup and Hairstyling for Matteo Garrone's Pinocchio. Her nomination was shared with Mark Coulier and Francesco Pegoretti.

== Selected filmography ==
- Caravaggio, directed by Angelo Longoni (2007)
- Gomorrah, directed by Matteo Garrone (2008)
- The Red Shadows, directed by Francesco Maselli (2009)
- The Perfect Life, directed by Lucio Pellegrini (2011)
- Reality, directed by Matteo Garrone (2012)
- The Landlords, directed by Edoardo Gabbriellini (2012)
- AmeriQua, directed by Giovanni Consonni e Marco Bellone (2013)
- Mi rifaccio vivo, directed by Sergio Rubini (2013)
- Like the Wind, directed by Marco Simon Puccioni (2013)
- The Mafia Kills Only in Summer, directed by Pif (2013)
- I Can Quit Whenever I Want, directed by Sydney Sibilia (2014)
- Greenery Will Bloom Again, directed by Ermanno Olmi (2014)
- An Italian Name, directed by Francesca Archibugi (2015)
- Chiamatemi Francesco, directed by Daniele Luchetti (2015)
- Maltese - Il romanzo del Commissario, directed by Gianluca Maria Tavarelli (2017)
- Rainbow: A Private Affair, directed by Paolo and Vittorio Taviani (2017)
- Dogman, directed by Matteo Garrone (2018)
- The Traitor, directed by Marco Bellocchio (2019)
- Pinocchio, directed by Matteo Garrone (2019)
- The Guest Room, directed by Stefano Lodovichi (2021)
- The Catholic School, directed by Stefano Mordini (2021)
- Robbing Mussolini, directed by Renato De Maria (2022)
- Io Capitano, directed by Matteo Garrone (2023)
