= List of Italian films of 2015 =

This is a list of Italian films first released in 2015 (see 2015 in film).

Title	Director	Cast	Genre
2015
Alaska	Claudio Cupellini	Elio Germano, Àstrid Bergès-Frisbey	Drama
Arianna	Carlo Lavagna	Ondina Quadri, Massimo Popolizio	Drama
Banana	Andrea Jublin	Camilla Filippi	Comedy-drama
Banat	Adriano Valerio	Edoardo Gabbriellini, Elena Radonicich	Drama
Belli di papà	Guido Chiesa	Diego Abatantuono, Matilde Gioli	Comedy
A Bigger Splash	Luca Guadagnino	Tilda Swinton, Matthias Schoenaerts, Ralph Fiennes	Thriller
Blood of My Blood	Marco Bellocchio	Roberto Herlitzka, Alba Rohrwacher	Drama
Burning Love	Alberto Caviglia	Omero Antonutti, Lorenza Indovina	Mockumentary
Chiamatemi Francesco	Daniele Luchetti	Rodrigo de la Serna, Sergio Hernández, Mercedes Morán, Muriel Santa Ana	Drama
Chlorine	Lamberto Sanfelice	Sara Serraiocco, Piera Degli Esposti	Drama
The Choice	Michele Placido	Raoul Bova, Ambra Angiolini, Valeria Solarino	Drama
The Complexity of Happiness	Gianni Zanasi	Valerio Mastandrea, Giuseppe Battiston, Hadas Yaron	Comedy
Deep in the Wood	Stefano Lodovichi	Filippo Nigro, Camilla Filippi	Thriller
Don't Be Bad	Claudio Caligari	Luca Marinelli, Alessandro Borghi	Crime
Eddy	Simone Borrelli	Simone Borrelli	Drama
Ever Been to the Moon?	Paolo Genovese	Raoul Bova, Liz Solari, Giulia Michelini	Comedy
First Light	Vincenzo Marra	Riccardo Scamarcio	Drama
God Willing	Edoardo Falcone	Marco Giallini, Alessandro Gassmann, Laura Morante	Comedy
A Holy Venetian Family	Pietro Parolin	Neri Marcorè, Piera Degli Esposti	Comedy
I Killed Napoléon	Giorgia Farina	Micaela Ramazzotti, Libero De Rienzo, Adriano Giannini	Black comedy
An Italian Name	Francesca Archibugi	Alessandro Gassmann, Valeria Golino, Micaela Ramazzotti	Comedy
Italiano medio	Maccio Capatonda	Maccio Capatonda, Herbert Ballerina, Barbara Tabita	Comedy
Land of Saints	Fernando Muraca	Valeria Solarino, Lorenza Indovina	Crime
The Last Will Be the Last	Massimiliano Bruno	Paola Cortellesi, Alessandro Gassmann, Fabrizio Bentivoglio	Comedy-drama
Latin Lover	Cristina Comencini	Virna Lisi, Marisa Paredes, Valeria Bruni Tedeschi	Comedy-drama
The Legendary Giulia and Other Miracles	Edoardo Leo	Luca Argentero, Edoardo Leo, Claudio Amendola	Comedy
Let's Talk	Sergio Rubini	Sergio Rubini, Isabella Ragonese, Fabrizio Bentivoglio	Comedy-drama
Lost and Beautiful	Pietro Marcello	Sergio Vitolo, Elio Germano	Fantasy-drama
Mediterranea	Jonas Carpignano	Koudous Seihon	Drama
Me, Myself and Her	Maria Sole Tognazzi	Margherita Buy, Sabrina Ferilli	Drama
Mia Madre	Nanni Moretti	Margherita Buy, John Turturro, Giulia Lazzarini	Drama
Natale col Boss	Volfango De Biasi	Lillo & Greg, Paolo Ruffini	Comedy
Partly Cloudy with Sunny Spells	Marco Pontecorvo	Luca Zingaretti, Carolina Crescentini, John Turturro	Comedy
Per amor vostro	Giuseppe M. Gaudino	Valeria Golino, Adriano Giannini	Drama
Si accettano miracoli	Alessandro Siani	Alessandro Siani, Fabio De Luigi, Serena Autieri	Comedy
S Is for Stanley	Alex Infascelli	–	Documentary
Somewhere Amazing	Giorgia Cecere	Isabella Ragonese, Alessio Boni, Paolo Sassanelli	Drama
Suburra	Stefano Sollima	Pierfrancesco Favino, Elio Germano, Claudio Amendola	Crime
Sworn Virgin	Laura Bispuri	Alba Rohrwacher, Flonja Kodheli	Drama
Tale of Tales	Matteo Garrone	Salma Hayek, Vincent Cassel, Toby Jones	Fantasy
Them Who?	Francesco Miccichè, Fabio Bonifacci	Edoardo Leo, Marco Giallini, Catrinel Menghia	Comedy
They Call Me Jeeg	Gabriele Mainetti	Claudio Santamaria, Luca Marinelli, Ilenia Pastorelli	Superhero
The Wait	Piero Messina	Juliette Binoche, Lou de Laâge	Drama
What a Beautiful Surprise	Alessandro Genovesi	Claudio Bisio, Frank Matano, Renato Pozzetto	Comedy
Wondrous Boccaccio	Paolo and Vittorio Taviani	Lello Arena, Kasia Smutniak, Carolina Crescentini	Drama
You Can't Save Yourself Alone	Sergio Castellitto	Riccardo Scamarcio, Jasmine Trinca, Roberto Vecchioni	Romance
Youth	Paolo Sorrentino	Michael Caine, Harvey Keitel, Rachel Weisz	Comedy-drama

== See also ==
- 2015 in Italy
- 2015 in Italian television
