= Ginevra De Carolis =

Italian costume designer (born 1985)

- Born: 1985 (age 40–41); Grosseto, Italy
- Occupation: Costume designer
- Years active: 2010–present

Ginevra De Carolis (born 1985) is an Italian costume designer.

== Career ==
De Carolis graduated from the University of Florence with a degree in Fashion Culture and Styling. She made her debut in the film industry in Letters to Juliet in 2010, working as an assistant to costume designer Nicoletta Ercole. She later worked as a costume designer on Stefano Lodovichi's films Aquadro and Deep in the Wood. In 2018, she designed the costumes for the comedy film Ears, which premiered at the 73rd Venice International Film Festival.

After moving to Rome, De Carolis met brothers Antonio and Marco Manetti, with whom she began collaborating for the TV series Inspector Rex and Inspector Coliandro. In 2019, the Manetti brothers entrusted De Carolis with the costume design for Diabolik, the film adaptation of the eponymous comic book. For her work on Diabolik, De Carolis received two nominations for Best Costumes at the David di Donatello Awards and the Nastro d'Argento in 2022. She was also confirmed for the sequels Diabolik: Ginko Attacks! and Diabolik: Who Are You?.

In 2022, she was the costume designer for Niccolò Falsetti's film Margins, which premiered at the 37th International Critics' Week of the 79th Venice Film Festival, and for the Amazon series Prisma.

== Filmography ==
=== Film ===
- Letters to Juliet (2010)
- Baciato dalla fortuna (2011)
- Paura (2012)
- Aquadro (2013)
- Short Skin (2014)
- Deep in the Wood (2015)
- Ears (2016)
- Imperfect Age (2017)
- Bed Number 6 (2019)
- The Crypt Monster (2021)
- Diabolik (2021)
- Margins (2022)
- Diabolik: Ginko Attacks! (2022)
- Diabolik: Who Are You? (2023)
- Non riattaccare (2023)
- U.S. Palmese (2024)
- The Negotiator (2025)
- The Last Slap (2025)
- Caro mondo crudele (2026)

=== TV series ===
- Double Swing (2012)
- Inspector Rex (2014–2015)
- Inspector Coliandro (2017)
- Prisma (2022)
- My Love (2024)
