= Cristina Serafini =

Italian theater and movie actress

- Born: 22 September 1978 (age 46); Turin, Italy
- Occupation: Actress
- Years active: 2006–present

Cristina Serafini (born 22 September 1978) is an Italian actress.

== Early life ==
Cristina Serafini was born in Turin, Italy, the only child of a journalist and a restaurant owner. She won a scholarship to attend the Scuola del Teatro Stabile di Torino (Union of the Theatres of Europe), founded by the Italian director Luca Ronconi. She graduated in 2006.

She speaks Italian, English, French and Spanish.

== Career ==
Serafini has appeared in 29 films and television series since the early 2000s (decade), including: Il Divo (film), Colpo d'occhio, Il bene e il male, Il peccato e la vergogna and Valzer, which was screened at the 64th Venice International Film Festival.

Serafini made her film début in the 2006 film Sono tornato al nord. Serafini's first significant role came in Roberto Cuzzillo's Senza fine (2009) as a young homosexual - winning her critical and commercial recognition, as well as the Best Actress in a Leading Role Award at 2009 Chieti Film Festival directed by Roberto Faenza.

In 2011 Serafini was selected for four lead roles. She played the role of Alessandro Gassman's fiancée in Natale per due and received the Best Rising Italian Actress Award at Premio Internazionale Euro-Mediterraneo, Rome, Italy.

Serafini, who has been photographed by paparazzi with American actor and director Sean Penn.

== Filmography ==
- Sono tornato al nord, directed by Franco Diaferia (2006)
- Un giorno da non dimenticare, directed by Giuseppe Dell'Aiera (2006)
- Valzer, directed by Salvatore Maira (2007)
- Colpi di sole, directed by Mariano Lamberti (2007)
- Chiedo alla polvere, directed by Vittorio Badini Confalonieri (2007)
- Crociera Vianello, directed by Maurizio Simonetti (2008)
- Colpo d'occhio, directed by Sergio Rubini (2008)
- Il divo, directed by Paolo Sorrentino (2008)
- Bigodini, directed by Bobo Piana (2008-2009)
- Il bene e il male, directed by Giorgio Serafini (2009)
- Terapia d'urgenza, directed by Lucio Gaudino (2009)
- Senza fine, directed by Roberto Cuzzillo (2009)
- Una donna, directed by Filippo Cavalca (2010)
- Il peccato e la vergogna, directed by Luigi Parisi (2010)
- Cercando Maria, directed by Franco Diafera (2010)
- Workers, directed by Lorenzo Vignolo (2011)
- Lacrime di San Lorenzo, directed by Giampiero Caira (2011)
- I tredici, directed by Riccardo Mazzone (2011)
- Limoncetta, directed by Paolo Genovese (2011)
- Un Natale per due, directed by Giambattista Avellino (2011)
- September Eleven 1683, directed by Renzo Martinelli (2011)
- Laila (Passion et colère), directed by Mohamed Zineddaine (2011)
- Niccolò Machiavelli il Principe della politica, directed by Lorenzo Raveggi (2012)
- Un passo dal cielo II, directed by Riccardo Donna (2012)
- Oggi a te…domani a me, directed by Marco Limberti (2012)
- Don Matteo, directed by Monica Vullo (2013)
- The Bold and the Beautiful, directed by Michael Stich (director) (2013)
- The Most Interesting Man in Studio City, directed by Ryan Wood (2014)
- Days of Our Lives, directed by Grant A. Johnson (2014)
- Non c'è 2 senza te, directed by Massimo Cappelli (2015)
- Day of the Dead: Bloodline, directed by Hèctor Hernández Vicens (2016)
- Acts of Vengeance, directed by Isaac Florentine (2017)
- The Poison Rose, directed by George Gallo (2019)
- Valley of Love, directed by Todor Chapkanov (2020)
- The Young and the Restless as Angelina Marchetti, directed by Sally McDonald (2021)

== Awards ==
- Best Actress in a Leading Role, Chieti Film Festival (2009)
- Best Rising Italian Actress, Premio Internazionale Euro-Mediterraneo, Rome, Italy (2011)
