= The Big Fake =

- Directed by: Stefano Lodovichi
- Screenplay by: Sandro Petraglia; Lorenzo Bagnatori
- Starring: Pietro Castellitto; Giulia Michelini; Andrea Arcangeli; Pierluigi Gigante; Aurora Giovinazzo; Edoardo Pesce; Claudio Santamaria
- Cinematography: Emanuele Pasquet
- Edited by: Roberto Di Tanna
- Music by: Santi Pulvirenti
- Distributed by: Netflix
- Release date: 19 October 2025 (Rome Film Fest)
- Running time: 116 minutes
- Language: Italian

The Big Fake (Italian: Il falsario, lit. 'The forger') is a 2025 Italian crime drama film directed by Stefano Lodovichi and starring Pietro Castellitto.

== Plot ==
Rome, 1970s. During the Years of Lead, three brothers move from Rieti to the capital: Antonio, known as Toni, an aspiring painter and artist; Don Vittorio, a newly trained priest in the Curia; and Fabio, known as Fabione, a metalworker with strong sympathies for the extra-parliamentary left. Toni immediately makes a name for himself, trying to sell his style, sketching portraits for female tourists in central Rome. One evening, after crashing the party of a well-known painter, The Artist, Toni meets an art gallery owner, Donata. She is drawn to his charisma, and the two spend the night together. The next morning, Donata notices, in Toni's small, dilapidated studio, a perfect copy he made of Gian Lorenzo Bernini's self-portrait, and is fascinated. She convinces Toni to make a copy of Amedeo Modigliani's Portrait of Paulette Jourdain and sell it to a buyer: the deal is a success, and the painting sells for eight million lire.

That evening, while the two are dancing at a club, Donata introduces Toni to the leader of the "Banda" (inspired by the Banda della Magliana), a notorious neo-fascist criminal organization in the city that runs all the shady dealings, Balbo, and his associates, Crocca and Pilota. Balbo is also intrigued by Toni's skills as a forger and immediately recognizes his potential. He offers Toni a luxurious studio in the city center, which he can use whenever he wants, provided he performs work for the Banda. As one of the first assignments, Balbo asks Toni to forge a passport for a man named Sansiro. The two men strike a chord and Sansiro confesses to owing Toni a favour in return.

Thus begins Toni's career as a forger, split between the work he does for the Banda and the fake paintings he creates for Donata. Meanwhile, Fabione joins the Red Brigades, a far-left terrorist organization, convinced they are the only ones who can change the country and save it from the Christian Democrats. During a mass held by Don Vittorio, Fabione asks Toni for an IBM typewriter, which he hands over without question. But when, along with Balbo, he hears on the radio that DC president Aldo Moro has been kidnapped, he realizes Fabione is behind the operation.

In the meantime, assured of Toni's trust, Balbo introduces him to Zù Pippo, a Sicilian mafioso, the gang's protector and intermediary with Cosa Nostra. Like Balbo and Donata, Zù Pippo admires Toni's talent and asks him to recreate Jacques-Louis David's Bonaparte Crossing the Great St. Bernard Pass. Toni accepts, offering it as a gift and ends up starting an extramarital affair with Virginia, Zù Pippo's assistant. Toni devotes himself full-time to painting for Zù Pippo, neglecting Donata and their commissions, including the forgery of Paul Gauguin's Vairumati.

Toni's talents do not go unnoticed, and Balbo is asked to introduce him to a shady and mysterious figure, a member of the secret service known as the Tailor, who requests Toni's help. He wants to forge a fake Red Brigades document, Communiqué No. 7, which informs Toni of the discovery of Aldo Moro in the Lago della Duchessa, making it clear to Toni that they would easily eliminate his loved ones if he were to refuse.

The relationship with Donata further deteriorates when she learns of Toni's relationship with Virginia and his shady dealings with the Tailor, especially when the latter orders Toni to contact Fabione, offering the Red Brigades ten billion lire in exchange for proof that the DC president is alive. But despite Toni providing Moro's photos, the Vatican envoy shows up empty-handed at the exchange. Thus, the Red Brigades, having ascertained that the government has no intention of negotiating, execute Aldo Moro and leave him in the trunk of a red Renault 4 in central Rome.

Donata, tired of Toni's behavior and relationships, leaves him. Balbo, feeling used by Tailor, like Toni, threatens to kill him if he shows up again. Tailor's reaction is immediate: he cuts the brakes on Balbo's car, and he dies in a car accident. Toni, who is threatened like Balbo, ignores the repeated warnings, and Tailor's men break into his house and break his hands, rendering him incapable of creating fake documents. Toni makes peace with his brothers. Don Vittorio, stressed by being outclassed by those with connections, uses the Curia's funds to renovate a soup kitchen and buy a new car; While Fabione is living in hiding to escape the police, he asks Toni for a false passport to leave, and in exchange, Toni gives him Aldo Moro's memoir, which is desperately sought by the state. Fabione, however, doesn't have time to escape, as the police raid his hideout and kill him. Toni is also reunited with Donata, who reveals that she is pregnant with his child.

Toni hides the will in an abandoned warehouse provided by Vittorio and chooses to flee with Donata after robbing a bank vault provided to him by Zù Pippo and the gang. He meets one last time with the Tailor, who demands Moro's memoir, but Toni will not provide it until he is certain that he and Donata are safe. The Tailor, however, interrogates Don Vittorio behind Toni's back. The latter, terrified but also enticed by the Tailor's promises, provides him with the memoir's location. Toni, ready to leave is stopped by Sansiro, the Tailor's hitman with whom he had previously worked, who informs him that he will die that evening unless Toni can provide him with a body to show to the Tailor. Determined to escape at all costs, Toni decides to meet with Don Vittorio, but fails to show up, saying he has sacrificed everything to get where he is. In this way, Toni condemns Don Vittorio to death, forced to die in his place because of their resemblance. Reunited with Donata in a taxi, the two leave Rome, wondering if it was really worth it.

== Cast ==
- Pietro Castellitto as Toni
- Giulia Michelini as Donata
- Andrea Arcangeli as Don Vittorio
- Pierluigi Gigante as Fabione
- Aurora Giovinazzo as Virginia
- Fabrizio Ferracane as Zù Pippo
- Mattia Carrano as Sansiro
- Edoardo Pesce as Balbo
- Claudio Santamaria as Il Sarto

== Production ==
The film is an adaptation of the novel Il falsario di Stato by Nicola Biondo and Massimo Veneziani. It is loosely based on real life events of the Roman forger and Banda della Magliana affiliate Antonio "Tony" Chichiarelli.

== Release ==
The film premiered at the 20th edition of the Rome Film Festival. It was released on Netflix on 23 January 2026.

== Reception ==
The film was an international streaming hit, reaching second place in the Netflix Global Top 10 of non-English language films.
