= Act of Vengeance =

Act of Vengeance may refer to:

- Act of Vengeance (1986 film), a television movie starring Charles Bronson
- Act of Vengeance (1974 film), an American exploitation film
- Five Minarets in New York, also known as Act of Vengeance, a Turkish-American action film

== See also ==
- Acts of Vengeance, a comic book crossover storyline
- Acts of Vengeance, a 2017 action thriller film
