= Margarita Rosa de Francisco =

Colombian actress and singer

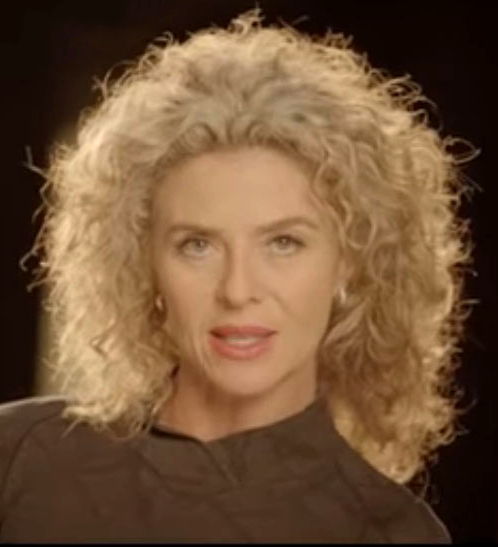

Background information
- Also known as: La Mencha
- Born: Margarita Rosa de Francisco Baquero; August 8, 1965 (age 61)
- Origin: Cali, Valle del Cauca, Colombia
- Genres: Latin Pop, Bossa nova, Fusion
- Occupations: Actress, singer, singer-songwriter
- Instrument: Vocals
- Years active: 1985–present
- Labels: Polydor, Polygram, Sonolux
- Website: http://www.margaritarosadefrancisco.co/

Margarita Rosa de Francisco Baquero also known as Margarita Rosa and La Mencha (born August 8, 1965) is a Colombian actress, singer, tv host and beauty pageant titleholder.

== Biography ==
=== 1980s ===
Margarita Rosa de Francisco was born in Cali, Valle Del Cauca, Colombia on August 8, 1965. She is the daughter of Gerardo de Francisco - a musician and actor - and fashion designer Mercedes Baquero. She is also the sister of TV personality Martin de Francisco. As a child, Margarita took ballet classes in the Antonio Maria Valencia Conservatory in Cali, which she had to quickly retire from due to problems in the vertebral column. She made her film debut in 1981 starring in the movie Tacones. She then moved to New York City to study English and in 1984 was selected as model of the year. Representing the "Valle del Cauca", she was crowned vicereine in the 1984 National Beauty Contest in Colombia, later representing Colombia in the 1985 Miss World pageant where she was not as successful.

In 1986 she made her television debut in the telenovela Gallito Ramirez, directed by Julio Cesar Luna. There she met Carlos Vives, and they married on August 20, 1988. Her time on the show earned her the Simon Bolivar prize for standout actress.

She was later a presenter in the news broadcast 24 Hours. In 1988 she consolidated her acting career once again in the telenovela Los Pecados de Ines de Hinojosa.

=== 1990s ===
The early 1990s was a busy period for Margarita, acting in the telenovela Calamar, as well as landing a role in another controversial Spanish series called Brigada Central. She later returned to Colombia to star in the series Puerta Grande and finally in Cafe con Aroma de Mujer in 1994, one of the most successful telenovelas in Colombian television history. In 1996 she starred in the movie Ilona llega con la lluvia and later got the role of Antonia in the series Hombres, which she eventually left to focus solely on a role in another telenovela, La Madre.

=== 2000s onwards ===
In 2000, Margarita accepted the role of La Caponera on the telenovela of the same name, produced by Caracol Television and RTI Producciones. She was also selected by Caracol to host the Colombian version of "Survivor", Expedicion Robinson, for two seasons in 2001 and 2002. She later attained roles in the movies Fidel y Adios and Ana Elisa while hosting the Caracol reality show Desafio 2004, which she has continued to do with the exception of 2007 in which scheduling conflicts with the Mexican telenovela Mientras Haya Vida prevented her from hosting. She would later guest star in the movie Paraiso Travel playing the role of Raquel and a small role in the series Capadocia.

She married for a second time with businessman Daniel Castello in 2003, when he was 46 and she was 38 years old.

In 2011, she played a starring role in the RCN Television series Correo de Inocentes alongside Salvador del Solar Labarthe and Roberto Urbina.

She later hosted the Caracol reality show "Desafio 2014: Marruecos, las mil y uno noches" and the 2015 "Desafio 2015: India, la Reencarnacion".

In 2023 she starred in the Italian movie El Paraiso directed by Enrico Maria Artale and presented at the 80th Venice International Film Festival, competing in the Orizzonti section.

=== Musical career ===
Margarita Rosa de Francisco achieved the level of singer/songwriter having been a part of the band in the telenovela Cafe con Aroma de Mujer, which would be favoured due to the success of the show at the time. In 1997 she released an album in which the song Veneno y Savia was lauded and reached certain recognition. In 1998 she was part of the musical group in another telenovela (La Madre), and again in the telenovela (Mientras Haya Vida). In 2008 "Margarita Rosa" was released – a collection of musical works over a variety of years.

She returned to the musical scene once again in 2011, this time having composed music for the series Correo de inocentes on RCN Television and in 2012 she launched Bailarina (Ballerina), a completely different album from her previous ones in which she experimented with a variety of genres.

=== Writing career ===
Margarita Rosa de Francisco has had a great deal of success as a columnist in the Colombian magazine Cromos, where she disclosed parts of her personal life – notably the day of her marriage with Carlos Vives. She has also written for Colombian newspapers El Espectador and El Tiempo. Within her writings are human themes such as feeling feminine without necessarily being a feminist, political themes (although she has stated her lack of interest in politics), and themes of general interests in columns with titles such as "La Envidia" (Jealousy), "El Arte de Vivir en Paz" (The Art of Living in Peace), "Por Pura Fe" (By Pure Faith), and "Respeto" (Respect), among others.

She published her first book in 2016 titled "El Hombre del Telefono" (The Man on the Telephone).

=== Other notable achievements ===
In 2000 she was named a Goodwill Ambassador for UNICEF by the United Nations.

== Filmography ==
- Colisión (2026) - Belén
- El paraíso (2023) - Magdalena
- Reefa (2020) - Jackeline
- Playing with Fire (2019) - Martina Gaiani
- Narcos (2017) TV Series - Carolina Álvarez
- Correo de inocentes (2011) - Pilar Carrasco
- Kadabra (2010) - Ana
- Of Love and Other Demons (2009) - Marquesa
- L'homme de Chevet (Cartagena) (2009)
- Capadocia TV series (2009) - Mercedes Mejía 'Esmeraldera'
- Paraíso Travel (2008)
- Mientras haya vida - Maria (2007)
- Adiós, Ana Elisa (2006)
- Fidel (2002) (TV) (as Margarita d'Francisco) - Naty Revuelta
- "Caponera, La" (2000) TV Series - Bernarda Cutiño 'La Caponera'
- "Madre, La" (1998) TV Series = María Luisa Caicedo de Suárez-Bernal
- "Hombres" (1997) TV Series - Antonia Miranda
- Ilona Arrives with the Rain (Ilona llega con la lluvia, aka Ilona arriva con la pioggia in Italy) (1996) - Ilona Grabowska
- Café con aroma de mujer - Carolina Olivares / ... (1 episode, 1994)
  - (Colombia: short title) – Café con aroma de mujer (1994) TV Episode - Teresa Suárez 'Gaviota'/Carolina Olivares
- Brigada Central (1993) TV Series - Marina Valdés
- "Puerta grande" (1993) (mini) TV Series - Paloma
- "Calamar" (1990) TV Series - Claramanta
- "Pecados de Inés de Hinojosa, Los" (1988) (mini) TV Series - Juanita de Hinojosa
- "Noticiero 24 horas" (1987) - TV News Host
- "Gallito Ramírez" (1986) TV Series - Niña Mencha Lavalle
- Tacones (1981)

== Presenter ==
- Desafío 2016: SúperHumanos
- Desafío 2015: India, la reencarnación
- Desafío 2014: Marruecos, las mil y una noches
- Desafío 2013: África, el origen
- Desafío 2012: El fin del mundo
- Desafío: La Lucha de las Regiones: La Piedra Sagrada 2011
- Desafío 2008
- Desafío 2005
- Desafío 2004
- Expedición Robinson

== Discography ==
Studio Albums

- 2012: Bailarina
- 2011: A Solas (En Vivo)
- 1997: Margarita Rosa

Soundtrack Albums

- 2000: La Caponera
- 1998: La Madre
- 1995: Café, Con Aroma de Mujer

In addition to the soundtrack albums she has collaborated with, de Francisco recorded in 2011 the song "Cuidao' que te quemas", which served as the opening theme of Colombian TV series Correo de Inocentes. In 2007 she also recorded "Mientras Haya Vida" as the opening theme of the Mexican telenovela of the same name.
