= Christian (TV series) =

Italian supernatural drama television series

- Italian Sky Atlantic poster
- Genre: Supernatural; Fantasy; Drama
- Created by: Roberto Saku Cinardi
- Based on: Stigmate by Claudio Piersanti and Lorenzo Mattotti
- Written by: Enrico Audenino; Valerio Cilio; Patrizia Dellea; Renato Sannio; Stefano Lodovichi; Valentina Piersanti
- Directed by: Stefano Lodovichi; Roberto Saku Cinardi
- Starring: Edoardo Pesce; Claudio Santamaria; Silvia D'Amico; Giordano De Plano; Antonio Bannò; Francesco Colella; Lina Sastri; Giulio Beranek; Laura Morante
- Composer: Giorgio Giampà
- Country of origin: Italy
- Original language: Italian
- No. of seasons: 2
- No. of episodes: 12

Production
- Executive producers: Nils Hartmann; Sonia Rovai; Erica Negri; Tommaso Arrighi
- Producers: Mattia Guerra; Stefano Massenzi; Andrea Occhipinti
- Cinematography: Benjamin Maier; Emanuele Pasquet
- Editor: Roberto Di Tanna
- Running time: 43–62 minutes
- Production companies: Sky Studios; Lucky Red; Newen Connect

Original release
- Network: Sky Atlantic
- Release: 28 January 2022 – 7 April 2023

Christian is an Italian supernatural drama television series, loosely based on the graphic novel Stigmate by Claudio Piersanti and Lorenzo Mattotti. The first season premiered on 28 January 2022 on Sky Atlantic and the second season premiered on 24 March 2023.

== Premise ==
Christian works as a henchman in the suburbs of Rome. He is alarmed to find strange wounds on his hands, which are eventually revealed to be the stigmata. After reviving his neighbor Rachele with a single touch, he realizes that he now has the power to heal people.

== Cast ==
=== Main ===
- Edoardo Pesce as Christian
- Claudio Santamaria as Matteo
- Silvia D'Amico as Rachele
- Giordano De Plano as Lino
- Antonio Bannò as Davide
- Francesco Colella as Tomei
- Lina Sastri as Italia
- Giulio Beranek as Biondo
- Laura Morante as Nera

=== Recurring ===
- Milena Mancini as Anna
- Gabriel Montesi as Penna
- Ivan Franěk as Padre Klaus Cerni
- Selene Caramazza as Benedetta
- Camilla Filippi as Esther Brocato
- Diego Verdegiglio as Cardinal Ripa
- Romana Maggiora Vergano as Michela Greco
- Francesco Giordano as Stefanuccio
- Andrea Bonella as Sergio
- Pietro Bontempo as Greco
- Dodi Conti as Maria Greco
- Christopher Capone as Lorenzo
- Valentina Pastore as Lisa
- Juana Jiménez as Virginia
- Khadim Faye as Taribo
- Mauro Aversano as Zingaro
- Gianluca Scuotto as Don Francesco

== Episodes ==
=== Series overview ===
Series	Episodes	Originally released	
Series	Episodes	First released	Last released
1	6	28 January 2022	11 February 2022
2	6	24 March 2023	7 April 2023

=== Season 1 ===
No. overall	No. in season	Title	Duration	Original release date
1	1	"Episode 1.1"	43 min	28 January 2022
2	2	"Episode 1.2"	46 min	28 January 2022
3	3	"Episode 1.3"	55 min	4 February 2022
4	4	"Episode 1.4"	48 min	4 February 2022
5	5	"Episode 1.5"	56 min	11 February 2022
6	6	"Episode 1.6"	59 min	11 February 2022

=== Season 2 ===
No. overall	No. in season	Title	Duration	Original release date
7	1	"Episode 2.1"	57 min	24 March 2023
8	2	"Episode 2.2"	48 min	24 March 2023
9	3	"Episode 2.3"	54 min	31 March 2023
10	4	"Episode 2.4"	48 min	31 March 2023
11	5	"Episode 2.5"	47 min	7 April 2023
12	6	"Episode 2.6"	62 min	7 April 2023

== Awards and nominations ==
Year	Award	Category	Nominee	Result	Ref.
2023	Nastri d'Argento Grandi Serie	Best Crime Series	Christian	Nominated	
2023	Nastri d'Argento Grandi Serie	Best Actor	Edoardo Pesce	Nominated	
