= I'm Not a Killer =

2019 film

- Directed by: Andrea Zaccariello
- Screenplay by: Paolo Rossi; Andrea Zaccariello
- Starring: Riccardo Scamarcio; Alessio Boni; Edoardo Pesce; Claudia Gerini
- Cinematography: Fabio Zamarion
- Music by: Leonardo De Bernardini
- Distributed by: 01 Distribution
- Release date: 2019
- Language: Italian

I'm Not a Killer (Italian: Non sono un assassino) is a 2019 Italian neo-noir legal thriller film co-written and directed by Andrea Zaccariello. It is loosely based on the best-selling novel Non sono un assassino by Francesco Caringella. It was shot in Apulia, between Bari, Monopoli and Accadia. For his performance in the film, Edoardo Pesce was nominated for a Nastro d'Argento as best supporting actor.

== Cast ==
- Riccardo Scamarcio as Francesco Prencipe
- Alessio Boni as Giovanni
- Edoardo Pesce as Giorgio
- Claudia Gerini as Paola Maralfa
- Barbara Ronchi as Vittoria
- Sarah Felberbaum as Beatrice
- Caterina Shulha as Katherine
- Silvia D'Amico as Alice
- Vincenzo De Michele as Michele Monno
- Elisa Visari as Marta
