= Martino's Summer =

Martino’s Summer
- Directed by: Massimo Natale
- Cinematography: Vladan Radovic
- Release date: 2010
- Running time: 90 minutes
- Country: Italy

Martino's Summer (Italian: L’estate di Martino) is a 2010 Italian drama film directed by Massimo Natale. It won the Audience Award at the 2011 Flaiano Prizes. It tells the story of a young man in southern Italy who has a romance with a vacationer from the north and learns to surf from an officer on a U.S. military base.

== Cast ==
- Treat Williams: Captain Jeff Clark
- Luigi Ciardo: Martino
- Matilde Maggio: Silvia (credited as Matilde Pezzotta)
- Simone Borrelli: Andrea
- Matteo Pianezzi: Luca
