= At a Glance =

2008 film directed by Sergio Rubini

- Directed by: Sergio Rubini
- Written by: Sergio Rubini; Carla Cavalluzzi; Angelo Pasquini
- Starring: Sergio Rubini; Riccardo Scamarcio; Vittoria Puccini
- Cinematography: Vladan Radovic
- Edited by: Giogiò Franchini
- Music by: Pino Donaggio, Ivan Iusco (additional music)
- Distributed by: 01 Distribution
- Release date: 2008
- Language: Italian

At a Glance (Italian: Colpo d'occhio) is a 2008 Italian thriller film written, directed and starred by Sergio Rubini. For his performance Riccardo Scamarcio won the 2008 Flaiano Prize for best actor.

== Cast ==
- Riccardo Scamarcio as Adrian
- Sergio Rubini as Lulli
- Vittoria Puccini as Gloria
- Paola Barale as Sonia
- Flavio Parenti as Claudio
- Sara D'Amario as Iolanda
- Fabrizio Romano as Benny
- Giancarlo Ratti as Nicola
- Cristina Serafini as The Doctor
- Emanuele Salce as Righi
