= Now or Never (2003 film) =

- Directed by: Lucio Pellegrini
- Written by: Angelo Carbone; Roan Johnson; Lucio Pellegrini
- Produced by: Domenico Procacci
- Starring: Jacopo Bonvicini; Violante Placido; Edoardo Gabbriellini
- Cinematography: Gherardo Gossi
- Edited by: Walter Fasano
- Music by: Giuliano Taviani
- Production companies: Fandango; Rai Cinema
- Distributed by: 01 Distribution
- Release date: 2003
- Running time: 104 minutes
- Country: Italy
- Language: Italian

Now or Never (Italian: Ora o mai più) is a 2003 Italian coming-of-age comedy-drama film written and directed by Lucio Pellegrini.

== Plot ==
David is a model student in the last year of the physics faculty at the Scuola Normale Superiore di Pisa; he practically lives in a parallel reality, made up of books and arguments on the highest systems, without any contact with everyday reality. Everything changes when, a few minutes before his last exam, he participates in a student collective to follow the unknown Viola, after the latter had given him a flyer: the exam skips, and with it most of David's certainties. The boy immediately falls in love with Viola, but he is also a good friend of Luca, Viola's boyfriend. The events lead David to participate in the occupation of a social center, and even in pseudo-subversive actions to the point of catapulting the entire group of dissidents in the midst of the violence that shook Genoa in 2001 on the occasion of the G8 summit.

== Cast ==
- Jacopo Bonvicini as David
- Violante Placido as Viola
- Edoardo Gabbriellini as Luca
- Elio Germano as Doveri
- Riccardo Scamarcio as Biri
- Toni Bertorelli as David's Father
- Camilla Filippi as Vanna
- Francesco Mandelli as Frankino
- Gabriele Biondi as Sorcio
- Francesco Bitti as Bianchini
- Massimo Bosi as Gom
- Paolo Sassanelli as Lt. Lusotti
- Thomas Trabacchi as Pietro
- Roan Johnson as Goliardo

== See also ==
- List of Italian films of 2003
