= Tutto l'amore che c'è =

- Theatrical Poster
- Directed by: Sergio Rubini
- Written by: Sergio Rubini; Domenico Starnone
- Produced by: Vittorio Cecchi Gori
- Starring: Damiano Russo; Margherita Buy; Sergio Rubini
- Cinematography: Paolo Carnera
- Edited by: Angelo Nicolini
- Music by: Michele Fazio
- Distributed by: Cecchi Gori Distribuzione
- Release date: 24 March 2000
- Running time: 95 minutes
- Country: Italy
- Language: Italian

Tutto l'amore che c'è (All the Love There Is) is a 2000 film by Italian director Sergio Rubini. It stars Damiano Russo, Michele Venitucci and, in a cameo role, Gérard Depardieu.

== Synopsis ==
Set in the 1970s, the film depicts Italian youths experiencing the sexual revolution of the previous decade, whilst addressing differences between Italy's southern and northern regions.

== Cast ==
- Damiano Russo: Carlo De Vito
- Michele Venitucci: Nicola
- Francesco Cannito: Enzo Garofalo
- Sergio Rubini: Carlo's Father
- Margherita Buy: Marisa
- Teresa Saponangelo: Maura
- Vittoria Puccini: Gaia
- Gérard Depardieu: Molotov
- Mariolina De Fano: Zia Rosa

== Production ==
Vittoria Puccini recalled that her first take was a sex scene and the second one was a nude scene on the male star's lap.

== See also ==
- Sergio Rubini
- Italian comedy
