= El paraíso (2023 film) =

2023 Italian drama film

- Directed by: Enrico Maria Artale
- Written by: Enrico Maria Artale
- Produced by: Carla Altieri; Roberto De Paolis; Andrea Paris; Matteo Rovere
- Starring: Edoardo Pesce; Margarita Rosa de Francisco
- Cinematography: Francesco Di Giacomo
- Edited by: Valeria Sapienza
- Release date: September 3, 2023 (Venice)
- Country: Italy
- Language: Italian

El paraíso is a 2023 Italian neo-noir drama film written and directed by Enrico Maria Artale. The film premiered in the Orizzonti section at the 80th edition of the Venice Film Festival, winning the awards for best screenplay and best actress (Margarita Rosa de Francisco).

== Cast ==
- Edoardo Pesce as Julio Cesar
- Margarita Rosa de Francisco as Julio's Mother
- Maria Del Rosario as Ines
- Gabriel Montesi as the drug dealer
