= Vittoria Puccini =

Italian actress

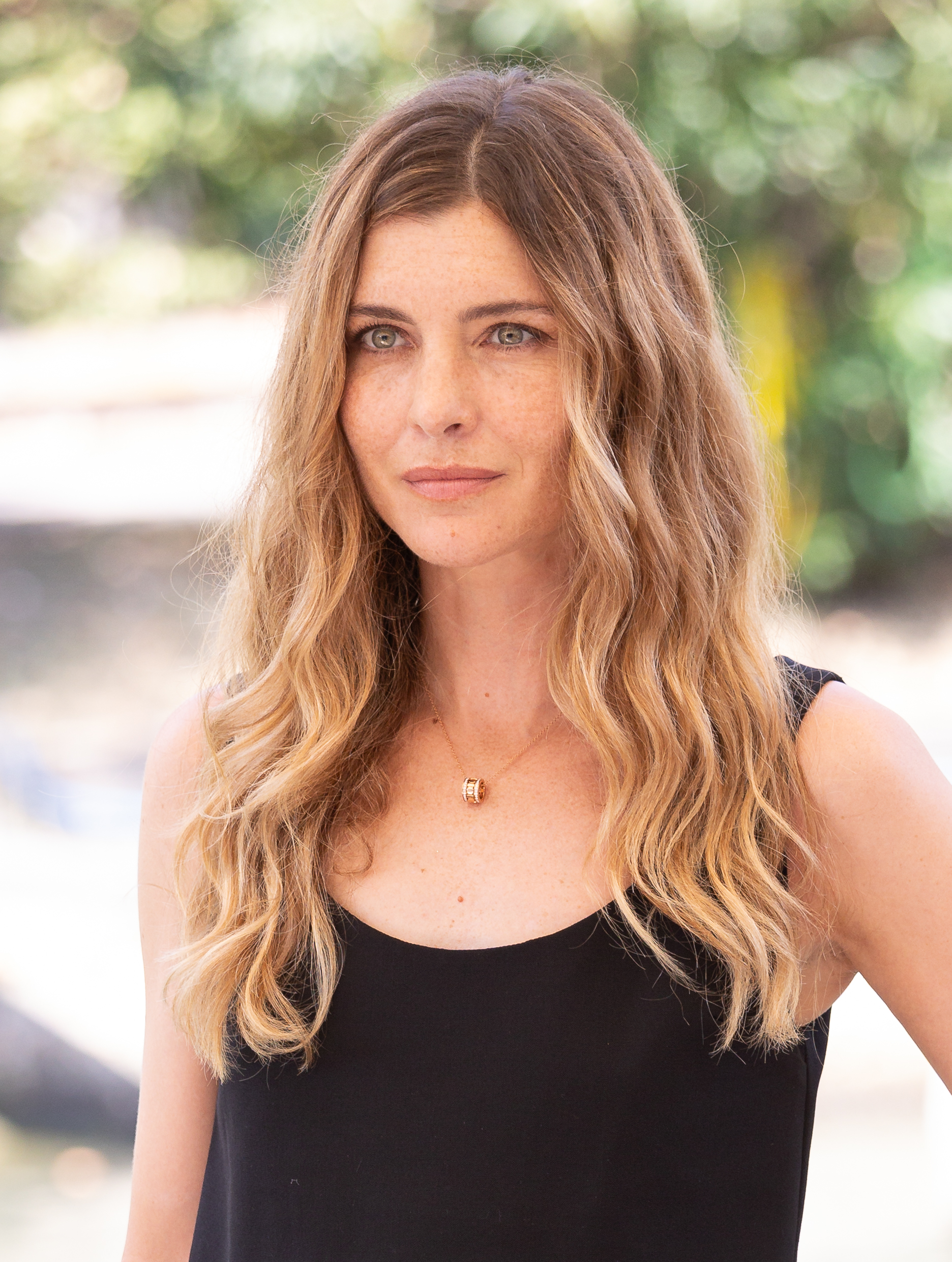
- Puccini in 2024
- Born: 18 November 1981 (age 44); Florence, Italy
- Education: Liceo Classico Michelangiolo
- Occupation: Actress
- Years active: 2000–present
- Children: 1

Vittoria Puccini (born 18 November 1981) is an Italian film and television actress.

== Career ==
Since her success as the lead actress in 2003–2005 costume drama television series Elisa di Rivombrosa, Puccini has continued to work in television and movie productions.

She played a lead role as Elena Guerra in the 2019 Netflix series, Il Processo (The Trial).

== Personal life ==
Puccini has a daughter with Italian actor and Elisa di Rivombrosa co-star Alessandro Preziosi.

== Commercials ==
Puccini is one of the Italian models and ambassadors for Pantene.

== Filmography ==
=== Films ===
Year	Title	Role	Notes
2000	Tutto l'amore che c'è	Gaia	
2002	Paz!	Mirella	
2005	But When Do the Girls Get Here?	Francesca	
2008	At a Glance	Gloria Tassi	
2010	Kiss Me Again	Giulia	
2011	The Perfect Life	Ginevra	
2012	Magnificent Presence	Beatrice Marni	
2012	Acciaio	Elena	
2013	Anna Karenina	Anna	
2014	Blame Freud	Marta Tarramelli	
2015	Wondrous Boccaccio	Monna Catalina	
2016	Tiramisù	Aurora	
2017	The Place	Azzurra	
2018	Cosa fai a Capodanno?	Nancy	
2020	18 Presents	Elisa	
2022	Quasi orfano	Costanza	
2022	Vicini di casa	Federica	
2023	The First Day of My Life	The woman	
2023	Una gran voglia di vivere	Anna	
2024	Trust	Nadia	
2025	Madly	Giulietta	
2025	Incanto	Felicia	
2026	Il rumore delle cose nuove		Paolo Genovese

=== Television ===
Year	Title	Role	Notes
2001	La crociera	Giulia	Television film
2002	Saint Anthony: The Miracle Worker of Padua	Tereisa	Television film
2003–2005	Elisa di Rivombrosa	Countess Elisa Scalzi-Ristori	Lead role
2004	Nero	Ottavia	Television film
2006	The Crown Prince	Baroness Mary Vetsera	Television film
2006	Le ragazze di San Frediano	Mafalda Lucerni	Television film
2007	La baronessa di Carini	Laura	Miniseries
2009	Tutta la verità	Paola Pavese	Television film
2010	Once Upon a Time the City of Fools	Margherita	Television film
2011	Violetta	Viola "Violetta" Valery	Miniseries
2013	Altri tempi	Maddalena	Miniseries
2013	Anna Karenina	Anna Karenina	Lead role
2015	L'Oriana	Oriana Fallaci	Television film
2018	Romanzo famigliare	Emma Liegi	Main role
2019	Mentre ero via	Monica Grossi	Lead role
2019	The Trial	Elena Guerra	Lead role
2021	La fuggitiva	Arianna Comano	Lead role
2022	Non mi lasciare	Elena Zonin	Main role
2025	Belcanto	Maria Valli	Main role
