= The Third Half (2013 film) =

- Film poster
- Italian: Il terzo tempo
- Directed by: Enrico Maria Artale
- Written by: Enrico Maria Artale; Francesco Cenni; Luca Giordano
- Produced by: Aurelio De Laurentiis; Luigi De Laurentiis
- Starring: Lorenzo Richelmy
- Cinematography: Francesco Di Giacomo
- Music by: Ronin
- Release date: September 2013 (Venice)
- Country: Italy
- Language: Italian

The Third Half (Italian: Il terzo tempo) is a 2013 Italian sport drama film co-written and directed by Enrico Maria Artale, at his feature film debut.

The film was screened at the 73rd edition of the Venice Film Festival in the Horizons section.

== Plot ==
Samuel is a troubled teenager with a drug addict mother and a father he never knew. He spent the last years of his life committing thefts, robberies and assaults, entering and leaving juvenile reform school. After serving yet another sentence, he is included in a rehabilitation program: he obtains semi-release and starts working on the farm in a small town in the Roman province. His supervisor is Vincenzo, a social worker who, after the death of his wife, struggles to find his balance. His life is divided between work, his teenage daughter and the local rugby team that he, a former professional player, trains. Samuel adapts with difficulty to the rules and new rhythms of life. His relationship with Vincenzo was immediately problematic, but it was the social worker who introduced him to the world of rugby.

The third half, which gives the title to the film, in rugby is the one that takes place at the end of the match: a match between opposing teams and fans. In a convivial atmosphere, based on fair play and on the recognition of mutual value, everyone celebrates together, regardless of who won or lost. This is precisely the most important phase of the game, the one that teaches the spirit of brotherhood and respect for the opponent. Values that the young protagonist, a classic bully used to living in a world based on the law of the strongest, has never learned. That of the third half is the first rule of rugby that Vincenzo teaches Samuel, showing him for the first time a world where team play is more important than solo action. A universe in which the boy does not recognize himself, but to which, little by little, he will begin to become passionate, as he never did before.

== Cast ==
- Lorenzo Richelmy as Samuel
- Stefano Cassetti as Vincenzo
- Edoardo Pesce as Roberto
- Margherita Laterza as Flavia
- Stefania Rocca as Teresa
- Piergiorgio Bellocchio as Marcocci

== See also ==
- List of Italian films of 2013
