= Valentina Carnelutti =

Italian actress

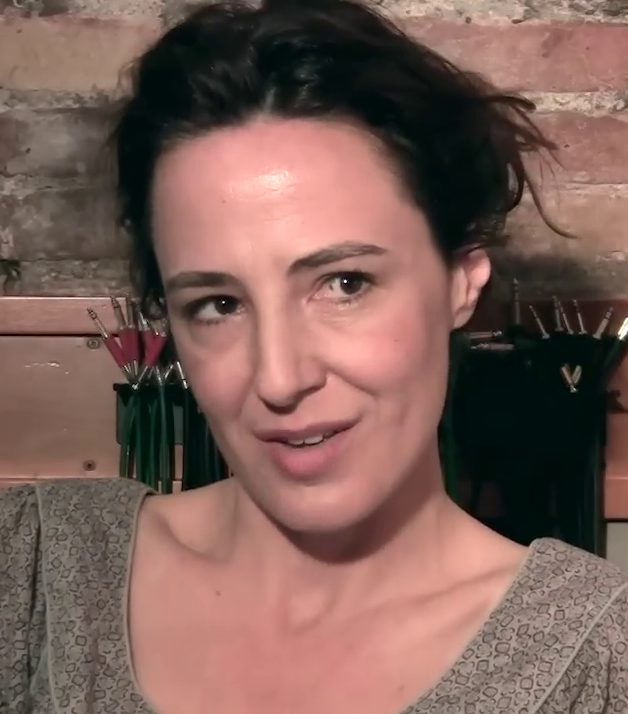
- Born: 6 February 1973 (age 53); Milan, Italy
- Occupation: Actress
- Years active: 1995-present

Valentina Carnelutti (born 6 February 1973) is an Italian actress. She has appeared in more than 40 films since 1995.

== Selected filmography ==
Year	Title	Role	Notes
1998	Gunslinger's Revenge		
2003	The Best of Youth	Francesca Carati	
2003	Instructing the Heart	Silvietta	
2007	Manual of Love 2		
2008	Quiet Chaos	Mamma 1	
2008	Your Whole Life Ahead of You	Maria Chiara	
2008	The Dust of Time		
2009	Little Sea	Professor Costa	
2009	The Red Shadows	Margherita	
2016	Like Crazy	Fiamma Zappa	Nominated—David di Donatello for Best Supporting Actress; Nominated—Nastro d'Argento for Best Supporting Actress; Nominated—Golden Ciak for Best Supporting Actress
2019	The Fakir of Venice	Gia	Premiered at April 2009 (Indian Film Festival of Los Angeles)
2022	Margins	Tiziana	Premiered at 2022 Venice International Critics' Week
2022	Rosaline	Lady Montague	
2022	Jumping from High Places	Betta	
