= Instructing the Heart =

Instructing The Heart
- Directed by: Giovanni Morricone
- Starring: Claudia Gerini; Pierfrancesco Favino; Sabrina Impacciatore; Pierre Cosso; Giovanni Esposito
- Cinematography: Giulio Pietromarchi
- Music by: Andrea Morricone; Ennio Morricone
- Release date: 2003
- Country: Italy

Instructing The Heart (Italian: Al cuore si comanda) is a 2003 Italian romantic comedy film. It marked the directorial debut by Giovanni Morricone, son of composer Ennio and brother of composer Andrea, who both co-scored the film.

== Cast ==
- Claudia Gerini: Lorenza
- Pierfrancesco Favino: Riccardo
- Sabrina Impacciatore: Paola
- Pierre Cosso: Giulio
- Giovanni Esposito: Gaetano
- Francesca Antonelli: Chiara
- Valentina Carnelutti: Silvietta
- Patrizia Sacchi: Elisa
