= Jumping from High Places =

2022 Italian film by Andrea Jublin

- Italian: Per lanciarsi dalle stelle
- Directed by: Andrea Jublin
- Written by: Alice Urciuolo; Chiara Parenti
- Based on: Per lanciarsi dalle stelle by Chiara Parenti
- Produced by: Paolo Sciarretta; Andrea Leone; Raffaella Leone
- Starring: Federica Torchetti; Lorenzo Richelmy; Cristiano Caccamo; Celeste Savino; Anna Ferruzzo; Valentina Carnelutti
- Cinematography: Daniel Massaccesi
- Edited by: Francis Garrone
- Music by: Luca Ciut
- Production company: Lotus Production
- Distributed by: Netflix
- Release date: 5 October 2022 (Worldwide)
- Running time: 88 minutes
- Country: Italy
- Language: Italian

Jumping from High Places (Italian: Per lanciarsi dalle stelle) is a 2022 Italian comedy-drama film directed by Andrea Jublin, based on the novel Per lanciarsi dalle stelle by Chiara Parenti. It was released on Netflix on 5 October 2022.

== Premise ==
Sole is a 25-year-old woman from Conversano who struggles with severe anxiety and panic attacks. After the death of her best friend, however, she sets out to conquer her greatest fears.

== Cast ==
- Federica Torchetti as Sole Santoro
- Lorenzo Richelmy as Massimo Di Lorenzo
- Cristiano Caccamo as Danio
- Celeste Savino as Miriam
- Anna Ferruzzo as Elide Santoro
- Valentina Carnelutti as Betta
- Beatrice Modica as Giulia
- Erika Vannucci as Marta
- Nicoletta Di Bisceglie as Lucia
