= Compagni di scuola (TV series) =

- Genre: Comedy-drama; Romantic comedy; Teen drama
- Created by: Tiziana Aristarco; Claudio Norza
- Starring: Massimo Lopez; Paolo Sassanelli; Imma Piro; Paola Tiziana Cruciani; Carlotta Miti; Elisabetta Pellini; Mauro Pirovano; Ruben Rigillo; Samuela Sardo; Vito Di Bella; Rosanna Banfi; Luigi Petrucci
- Composer: Andrea Guerra
- Country of origin: Italy
- Original language: Italian
- No. of seasons: 1
- No. of episodes: 26

Original release
- Network: Rai 2
- Release: 25 September – 18 December 2001

Compagni di scuola (English: Classmates) is an Italian teen comedy-drama television series that aired in 2001. It was produced by Publiglobo in collaboration with Rai Fiction and broadcast on the network Raidue. The show is an adaptation of the Spanish TV series Compañeros by Antena 3.

== Plot ==
Set in the school world, the series tells the story of professors and students of the "Giacomo Leopardi" Experimental Scientific High School in Rome. The series explores the complexities of relationships, career ambitions, and personal growth within a school setting.

The main characters are the Salina brothers:

- Felice Salina (played by Massimo Lopez): A fifty-year-old, intellectual, single vice principal, and philosophy teacher who is deeply invested in his role at the school.
- Giovanni Salina (played by Paolo Sassanelli): A younger, more outgoing science teacher who was married and is now divorced, grappling with the emotional challenges of being separated from his ex-wife while raising his daughter.

Their stories intertwine with those of their students, particularly those in class IV F, and other faculty members, creating a rich tapestry of personal and professional interactions.

== Cast ==
- Massimo Lopez: Felice Salina
- Paolo Sassanelli: Giovanni Salina
- Laura Chiatti: Valeria Filangeri
- Camilla Filippi: Arianna Cirese
- Cristiana Capotondi: Martina Antonelli
- Brando De Sica: Pietro Valobra
- Riccardo Scamarcio: Michele Reale
- Damiano Russo: Marco Barca
- Raffaello Balzo: Ettore
- Imma Piro: Marisa Ferrero
- Paola Tiziana Cruciani: la bidella Milva Filangeri
- Elisabetta Pellini: Virginia Giovardi
- Rosanna Banfi: Margherita Andreoli
- Valeria Valeri: Mamma Salina

== Production ==
This series, made in 2001 by the production company Publiglobo (controlled by Publispei) and Rai Fiction, is the Italian adaptation of the Spanish TV series Compañeros by Antena 3. The screenwriters were Mattia Betti, Sandro Petraglia, Fidel Signorile, Stefano Tummolini, and Alessandro Pondi. The direction was by Tiziana Aristarco and Claudio Norza.

The lead actors were Massimo Lopez and Paolo Sassanelli. The main cast included actors such as Imma Piro, Brando De Sica, Elisabetta Pellini, Raffaello Balzo, Valeria Valeri, Paola Tiziana Cruciani, Mauro Pirovano, Rosanna Banfi, and Anna Flati. The show also featured young and teenage actors who were not very well-known in 2001 but later became famous in Italian showbiz, including Giorgia Palmas, Laura Chiatti, Cristiana Capotondi, Damiano Russo, and Riccardo Scamarcio. Laura Chiatti also performed the opening theme song, titled "Tu sei."

The series was released in a DVD box set, now out of print.

== Episodes ==
The first and only season of the Italian TV series 'Classmates', consisting of 26 episodes, was broadcast as a first-run television show on Rai Due from 25 September – 18 December 2001.

nº	Title	Prima TV Italy
1	The year to come	25 September 2001
2	The Fourteenth	25 September 2001
3	Enough is enough	2 October 2001
4	I Want to Die!	2 October 2001
5	On the Edge of the Cliff	9 October 2001
6	On Air!	9 October 2001
7	Sylvester the Cat	16 October 2001
8	Children Are Children	16 October 2001
9	Top of the Class	23 October 2001
10	Everyone on a trip	23 October 2001
11	Mom ran away	30 October 2001
12	Leopardi vs. Pascoli	30 October 2001
13	Thefts at school	6 November 2001
14	Taking and leaving each other	6 November 2001
15	Tango lessons	13 November 2001
16	Slumber Party	13 November 2001
17	Silence... turn around!	20 November 2001
18	An almost perfect evening	20 November 2001
19	Slander is a breeze	27 November 2001
20	Checkmate	27 November 2001
21	Occupied school!	4 December 2001
22	Michè... open your eyes!	4 December 2001
23	Dear Michele...	11 December 2001
24	Love sickness exists	11 December 2001
25	The best of all possible worlds	18 December 2001
26	The best years of our lives	18 December 2001

=== The year to come ===
- Directed by: Tiziana Aristarco, Claudio Norza
- Written by:

=== Plot ===
A new school year begins at the "Giacomo Leopardi" scientific high school. Felice Salina is the vice-principal, a gruff man who melts at the sight of Professor Marisa Ferrero, who taught at the high school 8 years earlier and who has now returned. Felice's brother is Giovanni, a young and carefree science teacher (so much so that he arrives late on the first day of school). Among the students are Michele Reale, who has always been in conflict with Felice, his ex Valeria and her friends Arianna and Martina, the nice Pietro and his best friend Marco. Among the teachers. Virginia Giovardi, in love with Giovanni, Giorgio Baldanza, Margherita Andreoli, the principal Crespo; we meet the caretaker Milva, Marisa's friend and the school gossip. There is also Giovanni's daughter, little Sara. We also attend the beginning of the year party and in the meantime Sara's elementary school temporarily merges with the high school.

=== The Fourteenth ===
- Directed by: Tiziana Aristarco, Claudio Norza
- Written by:

=== Plot ===
At the end of the first episode Giovanni's car is destroyed. In this new episode Felice blames Michele Reale, who however is innocent. The boy reveals to Valeria, his ex-girlfriend, that it was his friend Er Pantera in his presence. In the meantime Arianna's father (former professor of Leopardi) accepts his firstborn Francesca and her child into his home, after old grudges.

== See also ==
- List of Italian television series
