= Valzer (film) =

- Directed by: Salvatore Maira
- Written by: Salvatore Maira
- Produced by: Stefano Sciarra
- Starring: Maurizio Micheli; Valeria Solarino
- Release date: 2007
- Running time: 90 mins.
- Country: Italy
- Language: Italian

Valzer ("Waltz") is a 2007 Italian film written and directed by Salvatore Maira. It was presented the first time at 64th Venice International Film Festival.

The film was quite all acted at NH Santo Stefano hotel in Turin.

== Plot ==
Assunta, is a young girl working in a luxe hotel where is a troubled meeting of leaders of the Football Association. Meanwhile, comes a man, just out of prison, father of Lucia, a friend of the Assunta. Among them it bears a friendship in which everyone finds consolation and hope for the future.

== Cast ==
- Maurizio Micheli: Lucia's father
- Valeria Solarino: Assunta
- Marina Rocco: Lucia
- Graziano Piazza: The chief
- Eugenio Allegri: The professor
- Zaira Berrazouga: Fatima
- Cristina Serafini: Young manager
- Giuseppe Moretti: Vittorio
- Francesco Feletti: The chief's assistant
- Francesco Cordio: The young trainer
- Benedicta Boccoli: Maria
- Rosaria Russo: Hammam's women
