= Adoration (TV series) =

Italian teen drama television series

- Italian Netflix poster
- Italian: Adorazione
- Genre: Teen drama; Coming-of-age
- Based on: Adorazione by Alice Urciuolo
- Written by: Donatella Diamanti; Tommaso Matano; Giovanni Galassi; Gianluca Gloria; Francesca Tozzi
- Directed by: Stefano Mordini
- Starring: Noemi Maganini; Alice Lupparelli; Beatrice Puccilli; Penelope Raggi; Luigi Bruno; Giulio Brizzi; Tommaso Donadoni; Federico Russo; Barbara Chichiarelli; Claudia Potenza; Ilenia Pastorelli; Noemi
- Country of origin: Italy
- Original language: Italian
- No. of seasons: 1
- No. of episodes: 6

Production
- Executive producers: Chiara Grassi; Linda Vianello
- Producer: Roberto Sessa
- Editors: Chiara De Cunto; Davide Minotti
- Running time: 41–51 minutes
- Production company: Picomedia

Original release
- Network: Netflix
- Release: 20 November 2024

Adoration (Italian: Adorazione) is an Italian teen drama television series directed by Stefano Mordini, based on the novel of the same name by Alice Urciuolo. It premiered at the 19th Rome Film Festival before being released on Netflix on 20 November 2024.

== Cast ==
- Alice Lupparelli as Elena
- Noemi Megagnini as Vanessa
- Beatrice Puccilli as Vera, Vanessa's cousin
- Giulio Brizzi as Giorgio, Vanessa's cousin and Vera's brother
- Penelope Raggi as Diana
- Luigi Bruno as Gianmarco
- Tommaso Donadoni as Enrico
- Federico Russo as Christian
- Alessia Cosmo as Teresa
- Federica Bonocore as Melissa
- Claudia Potenza as Manuela, Vanessa's mother
- Barbara Chichiarelli as Chiara, Melissa's aunt
- Ilenia Pastorelli as Enza, Vera and Giorgio's mother
- Noemi as Diletta, Diana's mother
- Max Mazzotta as Ricotta
- Mario Sgueglia as Andrea

== Episodes ==
No.	Title	Duration	Original release date
1	"Episode 1"	44 min	20 November 2024
2	"Episode 2"	42 min	20 November 2024
3	"Episode 3"	46 min	20 November 2024
4	"Episode 4"	45 min	20 November 2024
5	"Episode 5"	41 min	20 November 2024
6	"Episode 6"	51 min	20 November 2024

== Production ==
Netflix announced that they were adapting Alice Urciuolo's novel Adorazione in September 2023. The series was shot in Latina and Sabaudia.

== Release ==
A teaser trailer was released on 2 October 2024. The official trailer was released on 23 October 2024. The series premiered at the 19th Rome Film Festival in the Alice nelle Città section. It was released on Netflix on 20 November 2024.
