= Mattia Carrano =

Italian actor (born 2000)

Mattia Carrano (born May 13, 2000, in Rome) is an Italian actor.

== Biography ==
Mattia Carrano was born to an Italian father and Hungarian mother.

From 2022 to 2024 Carrano started as Andrea / Marco in the Italian Amazon Prime Video series Prisma (playing both brothers in a set of twins), alongside Lorenzo Zurzolo.

He plays the assassin Sansiro in the 2025 Netflix Italian crime drama The Big Fake set during the period of Italian contemporary history referred to as the "Years of Lead".

Carrano will next appear in the film B.A.E - Before Anything Else.

== Filmography ==
=== Film ===
Year	Title	Role	Notes
2025	The Big Fake	Sansiro	
TBA	Bae †	TBA	Post-production

=== Television ===
Year	Title	Role	Notes
2022–2024	Prisma	Andrea Risorio / Marco Risorio	Lead role
