= Astrid Meloni =

Italian actress (born 1982)

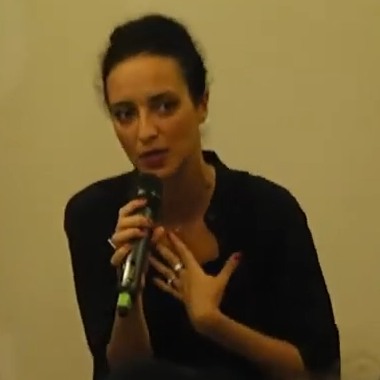
- Meloni in 2019
- Born: 11 March 1982 (age 43); Sassari, Italy
- Education: Sapienza University of Rome; Centro Sperimentale di Cinematografia
- Occupation: Actress
- Years active: 2008–present

Astrid Meloni (born 11 March 1982) is an Italian actress.

== Biography ==
Meloni was born in Sassari. Her father is Sardinian and her mother, who is of Eritrean descent, was born in Asmara and raised in Sardinia. At the age of 18, she left her hometown to study psychology at the Sapienza University of Rome. She later graduated from the Centro Sperimentale di Cinematografia.

== Filmography ==
=== Film ===
| Year | Title | Role | Notes | Ref. |
|---|---|---|---|---|
| 2008 | Your Whole Life Ahead of You | Journalist | | |
| 2014 | A Boyfriend for My Wife | Lara | | |
| 2014 | Soap Opera | Elena | | |
| 2014 | Eddy | Glenda | Short film | |
| 2017 | Equilibrium | Veronica | | |
| 2019 | Tornare | Irene | | |
| 2019 | L'ultimo piano | Teacher | | |
| 2021 | The Love You Don't Know | Lucia | | |
| 2021 | Freaks Out | Ape woman | | |
| 2021 | Marilyn's Eyes | Diana | | |
| 2022 | Where Life Begins | Silvia | | |
| 2022 | Hypersleep | Doctor Levi | | |
| 2024 | Il sogno dei pastori | Antonietta | | |
| 2025 | My Tennis Maestro | Beata Milella | | |

=== Television ===
| Year | Title | Role | Notes | Ref. |
|---|---|---|---|---|
| 2011 | Il delitto di via Poma | Simonetta Cesaroni | Television film | |
| 2018 | Bulletproof Heart | Isabella Bortolini | Episode: "La maledizione di Mitra" | |
| 2019 | Back to the Island | Irene Manca | 4 episodes | |
| 2019 | Storia di Nilde | Teresa Mattei | Television film | |
| 2020 | Luna Nera | Amelia | 5 episodes | |
| 2021 | Màkari | Flaminia De Simone | Episode: "La fabbrica delle stelle" | |
| 2022 | I Hate Christmas | Nina | 6 episodes | |
| 2023 | The Swarm | Mother | 8 episodes | |
| 2024 | Nudes | Laura | Season 2 | |
| 2025 | The Leopard | Maria Stella Corbera di Salina | 6 episodes | |
