= Edoardo Pesce =

Italian actor (born 1979)

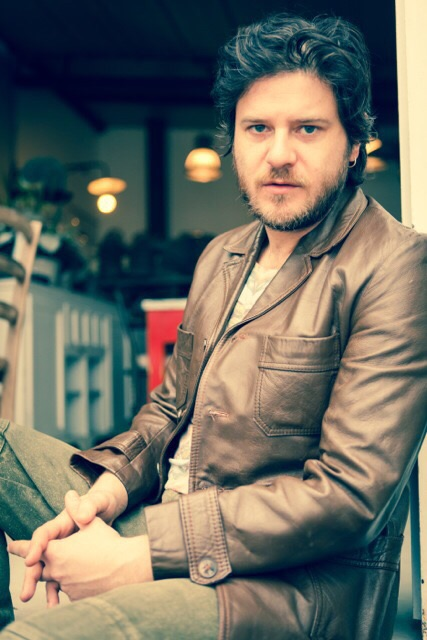
- Edoardo Pesce in 2014
- Born: 12 September 1979 (age 46); Rome, Italy
- Occupation: Actor
- Years active: 2007–present

Edoardo Pesce (born 12 September 1979) is an Italian actor.

== Biography ==
A student of the actor Enzo Garinei, Pesce began his career on stage, but gained notoriety with the TV series Romanzo criminale and I Cesaroni.

He received critical acclaim for his performance of the violent thug Simoncino in Matteo Garrone's Dogman, for which he won the David di Donatello for Best Supporting Actor and tied a Nastro d'Argento for Best Actor with the protagonist Marcello Fonte.

== Filmography ==
=== Films ===
Year	Title	Role(s)	Notes
2008	L'amore non esiste	Nicky	Short film
2010	20 Cigarettes	Tino	
2012	Viva l'Italia	Mazzone	
2013	AmeriQua	Il Nero	
2013	The Third Half	Roberto	
2013	Amori elementari	Agata's father	
2015	God Willing	Gianni Malloni	
2015	Il ministro	Michele	
2016	In bici senza sella	Aurelio	
2016	Tommaso	Gianni	
2016	Solo	Driving instructor	Cameo
2017	La verità, vi spiego, sull'amore	Simone	
2017	Fortunata	Franco	
2017	Pure Hearts	Lele	
2017	Niente di serio	Mazinga	
2018	Dogman	Simone "Simoncino"	
2019	I'm Not a Killer	Giorgio	
2019	Il colpo del cane	Dr. Mopsi / Orazio	
2019	Io sono Mia	Franco Califano	
2020	The Time of Indifference	Leo Merumeci	
2021	The Guest Room	Sandro	
2022	…altrimenti ci arrabbiamo!	Carezza	
2022	Notte fantasma	The Policeman	
2022	The Land of Dreams	Clemente Proietti	
2023	My Summer with the Shark	Corsaro	
2023	El paraíso	Julio Cesar	
2025	The Big Fake	Balbo	
2026	Il rumore delle cose nuove		Paolo Genovese

=== Television ===
Year	Title	Role(s)	Notes
2008–2010	Romanzo criminale	Ruggero Buffoni	Main role
2009	Piper	Emanuele	Episode: "Le ragioni del cuore"
2010	Due imbroglioni e mezzo	Gregor	Episode: "La nave dei truffati"
2011	Sarò sempre tuo padre	Luca	Television film
2013	Ultimo – L'occhio del falco	Officer Guglielmo Fiore	Television film
2013	Squadra antimafia	Michele Catena	Recurring role
2014	Non è mai troppo tardi	Eugenio Berti	Television film
2014	I Cesaroni	Annibale Vitale	Main role (season 6)
2017	C'era una volta Studio Uno	Antonello Falqui	Television film
2018–2020	Cacciatore: The Hunter	Giovanni Brusca	Main role
2019	Purché finisca bene	Ettore	Episode: "Non ho niente da perdere"
2021	Ai confini del male	Fabio Meda	Television film
2022	Boris	Tatti Barletta	3 episodes
2022–present	Christian	Christian	Lead role

== Awards and nominations ==
Year	Award	Category	Work	Result	Ref.
2023	Nastri d'Argento Grandi Serie	Best Actor	Christian	Nominated	
