= Alice Urciuolo =

Italian screenwriter and author (born 1994)

- Born: 1994 (age 31–32); Priverno, Lazio, Italy
- Occupations: Screenwriter; author
- Years active: 2019–present

Alice Urciuolo (born 1994) is an Italian screenwriter and author. She is best known for co-creating and writing the Amazon Prime Video series Prisma. She also co-wrote the teen drama television series Skam Italia and the Netflix comedy drama film Jumping from High Places.

Her novel Adorazione (2021) was adapted for a limited series of the same title on Netflix. It was released in November 2024 and started airing in the United States with English subtitles in May 2025.

== Early life ==
Urciuolo was born and raised in Priverno, a town in the Province of Latina, Lazio. Her mother is from Vallecorsa. After completing high school, she moved to Rome. She received a master's degree in serial screenwriting through Rai and attended a narrative writing course at Minimum Fax.

== Career ==
She wrote the majority of her debut novel, Adorazione, during the COVID-19 pandemic. The novel was among 12 finalists for the Strega Prize in 2021. It was adapted into a Netflix series, Adoration, in 2024.

After co-writing the teen drama television series Skam Italia, she and Ludovico Bessegato co-created and wrote the coming-of-age television series Prisma for Amazon Prime Video in 2022.

== Bibliography ==
- Adorazione (2020)
- La verità che ci riguarda (2023)

== Filmography ==
=== Film ===
- Jumping from High Places (2022)

=== Television ===
- Skam Italia (2019–22; 21 episodes)
- Prisma (2022–24; 16 episodes)
- Miss Fallaci (2024)
