= Cacciatore: The Hunter =

Italian television series

- Italian: Il cacciatore
- Genre: Police procedural; Crime drama
- Created by: Marcello Izzo; Silvia Ebreul; Alfonso Sabella
- Based on: Cacciatore di mafiosi by Alfonso Sabella
- Directed by: Stefano Lodovichi (eps. 1–6); Davide Marengo (eps. 7–20)
- Starring: Francesco Montanari; Miriam Dalmazio; Francesco Foti; Roberto Citran; Nicola Rignanese; Marco Rossetti; Giorgio Caputo; David Coco; Paolo Briguglia; Edoardo Pesce; Alessio Praticò; Marcello Mazzarella; Gaetano Bruno; Francesca Inaudi
- Country of origin: Italy
- No. of seasons: 3
- No. of episodes: 28

Production
- Running time: 55 minutes

Original release
- Network: Rai 2
- Release: 14 March 2018 – 10 November 2021

Cacciatore: The Hunter (Italian: Il cacciatore) is an Italian police procedural television series based on the autobiographical book Cacciatore di mafiosi by magistrate Alfonso Sabella. It originally aired on Rai 2 in March 2018.

== Background ==
Alfonso Sabella was a longtime investigating magistrate for the anti-mafia task force in Palermo, which was led by Giancarlo Caselli. Having captured Leoluca Bagarella and Giovanni Brusca and visited the locations where these criminal mobsters had savagely tortured and killed their victims, Sabella interviewed major and minor informants, collecting a mass of stories detailing violence, wiretapping, and street ambushes. Investigating and capturing criminal fugitives, who had sometimes hidden for many years in Sicilian territory—at the time partly beyond the control of the Italian government—was a task beset with great difficulties.

Sabella's book recounts the crimes and eventual capture of Mafia bosses like Bagarella, Brusca, and Pasquale Cuntrera—infamous for directing the massacres of the summer of 1993 and the 1992 assassinations of dedicated anti-Mafia prosecutors Giovanni Falcone and Paolo Borsellino—as well as the capture of the mafiosi Toto Riina and Bernardo Provenzano.
