= Banana (film) =

- Directed by: Andrea Jublin
- Written by: Andrea Jublin
- Produced by: Olivia Musini
- Starring: Marco Todisco; Camilla Filippi
- Cinematography: Gherardo Gossi
- Music by: Nicola Piovani
- Release date: January 15, 2015
- Running time: 90 minutes
- Country: Italy
- Language: Italian

Banana is a 2015 comedy-drama film written and directed by Andrea Jublin.

For this film Jublin was nominated for David di Donatello for Best New Director.

== Plot ==
Giovanni "Banana" is a boy who believes that in life one must seek happiness at all costs, at least for something, not for everything. That's why he works hard to win the love of Jessica, whom he wants to have in his class again next year. The only way to do that is to help her with the difficult task of avoiding failing the school year. To achieve his dreams, he knows he can rely only on himself, and he is willing to make sacrifices, fight, and endure hardship, because nothing in life is easy. After all, the rule of Brazilian football, of which Banana is a great fan, is that you have to attack with enthusiasm, but also with heart.

== Cast ==
- Marco Todisco as Banana
- Camilla Filippi as Emma
- Gianfelice Imparato as Banana's Father
- Giselda Volodi as Banana's Mother
- Anna Bonaiuto as Professor Colonna
- Giorgio Colangeli as The Principal
- Andrea Jublin as Gianni
- Beatrice Modica as Jessica

== See also ==
- List of Italian films of 2015
