= The Trial (Italian TV series) =

Italian television series

- Italian: Il processo
- Genre: Legal drama; Crime drama; Procedural drama
- Created by: Alessandro Fabbri
- Directed by: Stefano Lodovichi
- Starring: Vittoria Puccini; Francesco Scianna; Camilla Filippi
- Country of origin: Italy
- No. of seasons: 1
- No. of episodes: 8

Production
- Producer: Andrea Occhipinti
- Running time: 50 minutes

Original release
- Network: Canale 5
- Release: November 29 – December 13, 2019

The Trial (Italian: Il processo) is an Italian television mini-series, composed of 8 episodes, created by Alessandro Fabbri, in collaboration with Laura Colella and Enrico Audenino, and directed by Stefano Lodovichi.

It originally aired in Italy in November 2019 and was released on Netflix on 10 April 2020.

== Synopsis ==
The protagonist is a successful prosecutor, Elena Guerra, who is about to take a leave of absence from her public prosecutor job in Mantua, Italy, to go to New York where her husband has accepted a job. This plan is upended when she is assigned a delicate case where a very wealthy local woman Linda Monaco is accused of brutally murdering Angelica Petroni, a 17 year old found dead in a canal. Linda is defended by the noted and very ambitious criminal defense lawyer Ruggero Barone.

== Cast ==
- Vittoria Puccini as Elena Guerra
- Francesco Scianna as Ruggero Barone
- Margherita Caviezel as Angelica Petronio
- Camilla Filippi as Linda Monaco
- Michele Morrone as Claudio Cavalleria
- Maurizio Lastrico as Giovanni Malaguti
- Simone Colombari as Giacomo Andreoli
- Alessandro Averone as Stefano Lanzoni
- Pia Lanciotti as Fabrizia Furlan
- Tommaso Ragno as Gabriele Monaco
- Euridice Axen as Mara Raimondi
- Roberto Herlitzka as Giancarlo Guerra

== Production ==
The series was co-produced by Lucky Red and RTI.

=== Filming ===
The series was filmed in the city of Mantua. Locations include: Palazzo Te, Piazza Sordello, Palazzo d'Arco, Palazzo Beccaguti, Palazzo Cavriani, Palazzo Andreani and the lakes of Mantua, as well as some scenes in Rome.

== Reception ==
Rated a 9 of 10 by Rotten Tomatoes with viewer comments that the acting is very good, the Mantua story's setting in north central Italy interesting, but the dialog, dubbed in English, at times doesn't correlate well with the video.

== See also ==
- List of Italian television series
