= Damiano Russo =

Italian actor

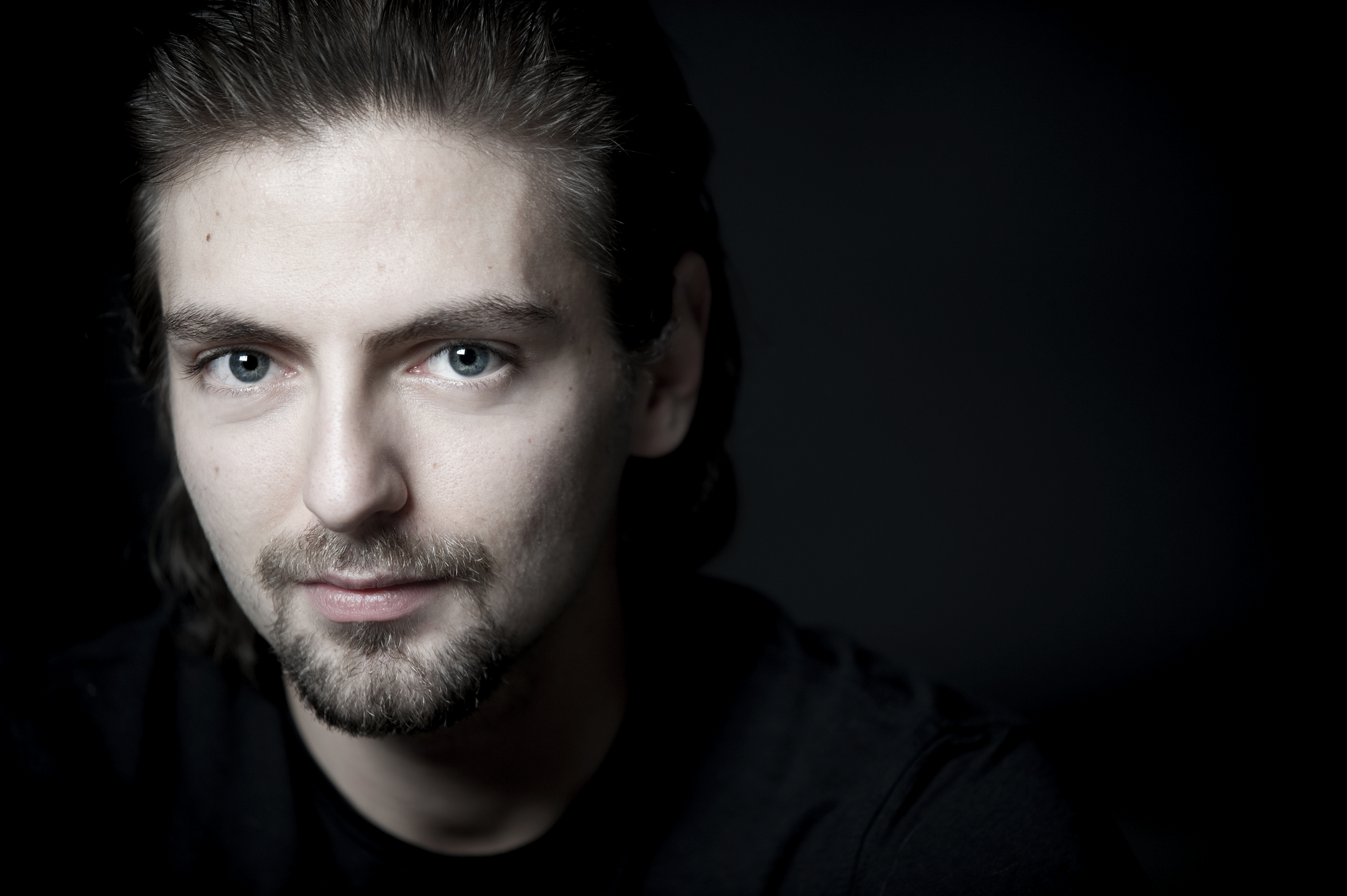
Damiano Russo in 2011.

Damiano Russo (July 26, 1983 – October 21, 2011) was an Italian actor.

== Biography ==
Russo was born in Bari, Italy and spent part of his life in Rome.

== Career ==
After his film debut in 1998, in Io non ho la testa, directed by Michele Lanubile, in 1999 he starred in Tutto l'amore che c'è (All the Love There Is), directed by Sergio Rubini. This second film earned him the Capitello d'Oro award at the Sannio FilmFest and a nomination for the Italian Golden Globe film award.

In 2001 he made his debut on the small screen with the RAI TV series Compagni di scuola, and later starred in several other RAI dramas and series, including the popular soap opera Un posto al sole, and the Canale 5 film Come un delfino, the latter produced by Raoul Bova.

In 2004, he took a leading film role in Answer Me (Nel mio amore), directed by Susanna Tamaro, based on the novel by Tamaro of the same name. In 2010 in A Second Childhood (Italian: Una sconfinata giovinezza, also known as Endless Youth), directed by Pupi Avati

== Death ==
He died in Rome on the evening of October 21, 2011, at the age of 28, in a motorbike accident. On Sunday October 23, at Teatro Valle, in Rome, family, friends and colleagues gathered to commemorate Damiano's life and career.

=== Aftermath and tributes ===
Ten years after his death, a garden located in the Poggiofranco neighborhood of Bari was named after Russo.

== Awards and nominations ==
Sannio FilmFest – Capitelli d'Oro

2000: Tutto l'amore che c'è (All the Love There Is), won.

Italian Golden Globe

2000: Tutto l'amore che c'è (All the Love There Is), nominated.

== Filmography ==
=== Films ===
Year	Title	Role	Notes
1998	Io non ho la testa	Teolepto	
2000	Tutto l'amore che c'è	Carlo De Vito	
2004	Nel mio amore	Michele	
2009	Ice Cream	Miky	Short film
2010	A Second Childhood	Tullio	Final film role

=== Television ===
Year	Title	Role	Notes
2001	Compagni di scuola	Marco Barca	Main role
2004	La tassista	Damiano	3 episodes
2005	Distretto di Polizia	Ivano Frattini	Episode: "Il giustiziere"
2005	Il veterinario	Riccardo	Television film
2006	Un posto al sole	Bruno Mainardi	2 episodes
2007	R.I.S. Delitti Imperfetti	Michele Fantoni	Episode: "Tra la vita e la morte"
2007	Medicina generale	Michele	Episode: "Errori"
2008	Così vanno le cose	Carlo	Television film
2008–2009	I liceali	Fabio Petrucci	Recurring role
2011–2013	Come un delfino	Nazi	Main role (second season released posthumously)
