= Portrait of Paulette Jourdain =

1919 painting by Amedeo Modigliani

Paulette Jourdain
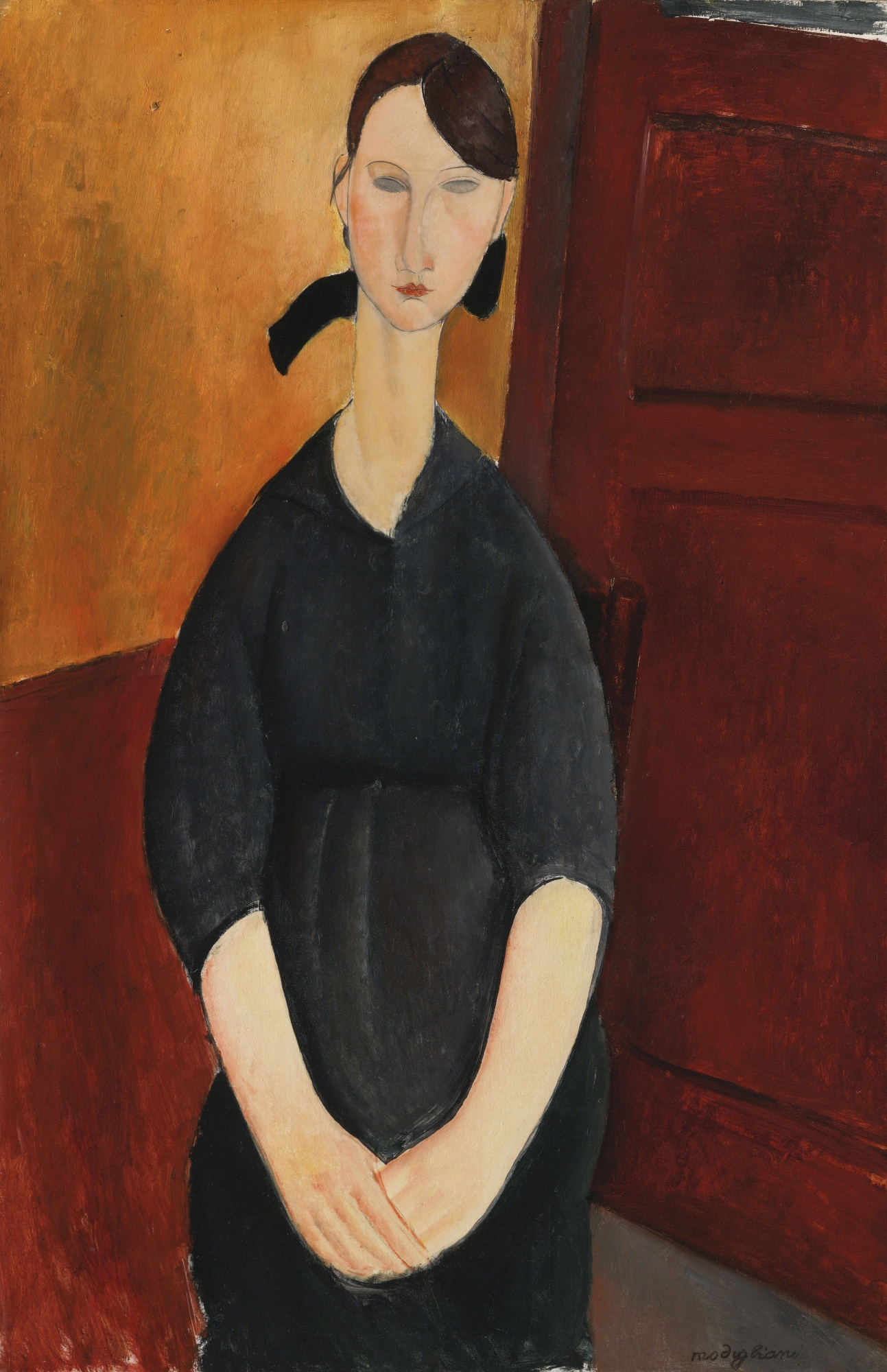
- Artist: Amedeo Modigliani
- Year: 1919
- Type: Oil paint on canvas
- Dimensions: 39.5 by 25.75 inches (100.3 cm × 65.4 cm)
- Location: Private collection

Portrait of Paulette Jourdain is a 1919 oil painting by Italian painter Amedeo Modigliani. It was in the personal collection of A. Alfred Taubman. The painting was sold at auction by Sotheby's in November 2015 for $42.8 million. The painting depicts Pauline Jourdain, who moved from Concarneau in Brittany to Paris in 1919 as a teenager. One of Modigliani's largest works, it shows Cubist influences and references the Mona Lisa. The painting was in the private collection of Liu Yiqian and was sold auction in 2023 for an unexpected low price of $34.9 million dollars.
