= Deep in the Wood =

- Directed by: Stefano Lodovichi
- Written by: Isabella Aguilar; Stefano Lodovichi; Davide Orsini
- Produced by: Manuela Cacciamani
- Starring: Filippo Nigro; Camilla Filippi
- Cinematography: Benjamin Maier
- Music by: Riccardo Amorese
- Distributed by: Minerva Pictures (World-wide, 2015)(theatrical)
- Release date: November 19, 2015
- Country: Italy
- Language: Italian

Deep in the Wood (Italian: In fondo al bosco Italian pronunciation: [iɱ ˈfondo al ˈbɔsko]) is a 2015 thriller-drama film written and directed by Stefano Lodovichi and starring Filippo Nigro and Camilla Filippi.

== Plot ==
When a boy reappears after five long years, his father welcomes him back with open arms, but the mother has eerie suspicions that he is not her son. The maternal grandfather does not think he is his grandson either and the family dog kept barking every time it saw the boy. The plot starts to unfold. The town has an annual festival where the adults dress up as devils, some believe the real devil is among them. When the son disappears, the father is accused of killing him but they never find the body of the boy. It turns out that during the festival, the boy witnessed some teenagers making out in a cabin and when he ran away into the forest, one of them chased after him and accidentally knocked him unconscious. They thought he was dead and thought of hiding his body in some cavern where no one will ever find him. But he woke up and returned home to his mother who was sleeping under the influence of some medication. She wanted him to be quiet so she snuggled him close to her chest and suffocated him. His body was then moved to that cavern. When a boy appeared in the village years later, the medical examiner who is secretly having an affair with the mother falsified the test results claiming that he is indeed the lost boy to please the mother. But the boy claimed he does not remember his past nor does he recognise anyone around him and does not like his favorite food they prepared for him. The grandfather thought he was evil and the teenagers do not recognise him either. Finally the grandfather and the mother throw him in a well outside the house, but the father throws him a rope and saves him. The truth came out, the father accepted the boy as his son and they grow closer.

== Cast ==
- Filippo Nigro as Manuel Conci
- Camilla Filippi as Linda Weiss
- Teo Achille Caprio as Tommaso Conci
- Giovanni Vettorazzo as Pietro Weiss
- Stefano Detassis as Hannes Ortner
- Maria Vittoria Barrella as Else
- Roberto Gudese as Flavio
- Luca Filippi as Dimitri

== See also ==
- List of Italian films of 2015
