= Acts of Vengeance (film) =

2017 film directed by Isaac Florentine

- Theatrical release poster
- Directed by: Isaac Florentine
- Written by: Matt Venne
- Produced by: Boaz Davidson; Yariv Lerner
- Starring: Antonio Banderas; Karl Urban; Paz Vega; Cristina Serafini
- Cinematography: Yaron Scharf
- Edited by: Paul Harb; Ivan Todorov Ivanov; Irit Raz
- Music by: Frederik Wiedmann
- Production companies: Saban Capital Group; Millennium Films
- Distributed by: Saban Films
- Release date: October 27, 2017
- Running time: 87 minutes
- Countries: Bulgaria; United States
- Language: English
- Box office: $320,705

Acts of Vengeance is a 2017 action thriller film directed by Isaac Florentine. It stars Antonio Banderas as a lawyer avenging the deaths of his wife and daughter. The film also features Karl Urban, Paz Vega, and Cristina Serafini.

== Plot ==
The wife and daughter of Pittsburgh lawyer Frank Valera (Antonio Banderas), Sue (Cristina Serafini) and Olivia, are killed shortly after a talent show in which Olivia sings a song for Frank, and their bodies are dumped in a hole near the train yard. Before the murder, Frank was delayed (due to a traffic jam) and could not make it to the talent show on time, so Sue sent a video of Olivia's performance to Frank. After the funeral, Frank's father-in-law Chuck (Robert Forster) confronts him and tells him not to speak to him anymore. Frank visits the police station to discuss the murders, and Pittsburgh Police Detective Bill Lustiger (Johnathon Schaech) informs him that the police found a gold fiber at the murder scene. Lustiger suspects that the murderers belong to the Russian mafia, which operates in the area of the crime.

After subjecting himself to beatings in an illegal mixed martial arts ring to atone for his perceived guilt for the murders, Frank is rescued by Pittsburgh Police officer Hank Strode (Karl Urban), whom Frank met earlier at the station. However, when Strode informs Frank that his family's case has become "cold," Frank leaves, dismayed and depressed. Later, when getting involved in a fight to help a child prostitute, Frank falls through a window of a book store, where he fortuitously grabs Marcus Aurelius's Meditations to help stop the bleeding of a leg wound. Frank reads parts of the book and changes his attitude about what he should do next and how he should proceed, adopting a Stoic philosophy. He then takes a Stoic vow of silence until the case is solved and sets out to learn the skills required to do so.

After learning combat skills with masters of karate and Brazilian jiu-jitsu, Frank goes to the train yard, where the crime took place, to investigate. He encounters Russian thugs and defeats them, though he is injured in the process by a bullet. A nurse, Alma (Paz Vega), arrives and brings him to her home to treat his injuries. The next day, Frank returns to his home. On the way, he adopts a dog previously owned by his attackers. Later, Alma approaches to return his wallet, which he left at her place. Alma learns about his family's death and the yard, and she befriends him.

Frank attempts to find the potential witness who lives in a makeshift shelter, but he loses him. As he drives Alma home later, she reveals that the shelter Frank investigated was the home of a man called "Mr. Shivers" (Clint Dyer), who works as a cook at the local diner. After he drops Alma off, Russian gang members appear and ask Alma if she is going to continue supplying drugs to them. Frank suddenly appears and incapacitates them. She explains that she worked with them for a year, stealing drugs from her hospital for them. Frank takes her to his home for her safety.

Frank finds Mr. Shivers working in the kitchen of a diner; they fight. Frank shows his family picture to Shivers, who witnessed the murders from his shelter. Shivers says that a police officer committed the murders. Frank then sneaks into the police station and finds that Hank Strode was assigned to patrol that particular district on the night of the murders.

After several days of following Strode, Frank enters Strode's house and finds a police jacket with gold fibers coming loose from an embroidered sleeve badge. Frank also finds a bag that contains magazines with Frank on the cover, news articles about Strode's 12-twelve-year-old's murder, and Frank's legal defense of the suspect, who was freed on a technicality. Strode wanted Frank to suffer for freeing the suspect, and he wanted Frank to know what Strode felt. Frank leaves a note for Strode, saying that he will meet at a warehouse. As Strode arrives, a fight ensues, leaving both injured. Managing to subdue Strode, Frank overcomes his desire to kill him upon remembering Aurelius' quote, "The best revenge is to be unlike your enemy," and instead knocks Strode out.

Later, after Strode's trial and conviction, Frank and Alma visit the graves of his wife and daughter, where Frank finally ends his vow of silence by saying "I love you" to his family's graves.

== Cast ==
- Antonio Banderas as Frank Valera
- Atanas Srebrev as Senior Partner
- Clint Dyer as Mr. Shivers
- Cristina Serafini as Susan Valera
- Elizabeth Brace as Young Girl
- Isaac Florentine as Karate Sensei
- Johnathon Schaech as Detective Bill Lustiger
- Karl Urban as Officer Hank Strode
- Lillian Blankenship as Olivia Valera
- Mark Rhino Smith as Police Officer
- Paz Vega as Alma
- Raicho Vasilev as Timofei
- Robert Forster as Chuck
- Tim Man as Jiu-Jitsu Sensei
- Velislav Pavlov as Colonel

== Release ==
Acts of Vengeance was released in select theaters and on VOD on October 27, 2017.

== Reception ==
On review aggregator Rotten Tomatoes, the film holds an approval rating of 64% based on 11 reviews, with an average rating of 6.1/10. On Metacritic, it has a weighted average score of 49 out of 100, based on four critics, indicating "mixed or average" reviews.
