= Simone Borrelli =

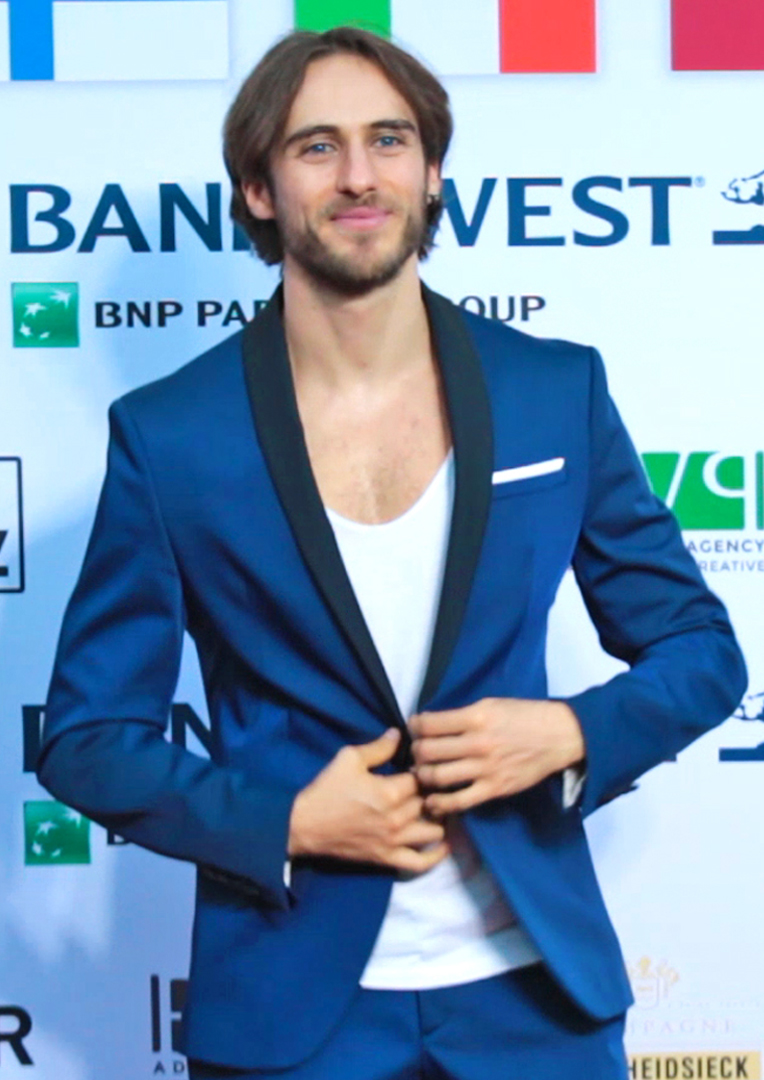
- Borrelli at the American Cinematheque in Hollywood for the European Film Festival
- Born: Simone Borrelli; November 5, 1985 (age 41); Crotone, Calabria, Italy
- Occupations: Actor; director; singer; songwriter; musician; screenwriter; record producer
- Years active: 2000–present
- Musical career
- Genres: Pop; R&B
- Instruments: Vocals; guitar; keyboards
- Website: www.simoneborrelli.com

Simone Borrelli (Italian pronunciation: [siˈmoːne borˈrɛlli]; born 5 November 1985) is an Italian actor, director, singer, songwriter, musician, screenwriter and producer.

== Early life and career beginnings ==
Born in Crotone, Borrelli began his acting training early at the Teatro Stabile di Calabria, directed by Geppy Gleijeses and Alvaro Piccardi, with whom he began working at the age of 16. He graduated in acting and dramatic arts from the Italian Academy of Dramatic Arts "Alessandra Galante Garrone" in Bologna, receiving the Giusto Monaco Prize for Best Young Actor in 2004 for his performance as Hector in The Trojan War Will Not Take Place by Jean Giraudoux. He subsequently deepened his cinematic studies by studying with acting coaches associated with New York’s Actors Studio.

== Television and film ==
Borrelli made his small screen debut in 2008, playing the role of Mauro Morbello among the main cast of the TV series Terapia d'urgenza, broadcast on Rai 2, and in the miniseries Quo vadis, baby? by Gabriele Salvatores and Guido Chiesa for Sky Cinema. Subsequently, for Mediaset, he played the character of Ivan in the second season of the fiction Anna e i cinque, alongside Sabrina Ferilli. He is also known for the role of Mario, the vending machine technician, in the fifth season of the sitcom Camera Café.

In 2010 he acted in the film Martino's Summer (L’estate di Martino) by Massimo Natale, playing the role of Andrea alongside Treat Williams; the film was presented in competition at the Rome Film Festival. In 2011 he wrote the screenplay for the film Venerdì Sera.

== Eddy and international recognition ==
In 2014 he wrote, directed and starred in the film Eddy, dedicated to the theme of violence against children, also composing its original soundtrack. The work received recognition as the Official Human Rights Movie 2015 from the Council of Europe and was supported by the Presidency of the Council of Ministers, the Ministry of Education, Universities and Research (MIUR), UNICEF and Amnesty International.

On 24 September 2015, Eddy was selected to open the “Starring Europe – European Film Festival” at Grauman's Egyptian Theatre in Hollywood, organised by the American Cinematheque in collaboration with the Academy of Motion Picture Arts and Sciences, the Academy Awards and the Golden Globes Foundation.

Borrelli embarked on an international tour, presenting Eddy at screenings and events in numerous countries and at several universities, including Stanford University, UC Berkeley and UCLA, and he was invited to take part in the celebrations for the 60th anniversary of Italy’s accession to the United Nations. The tour, known as the "Eddy Tour", included a live performance accompanied by the film’s original soundtrack orchestra, and comprised more than 90 dates, 11 of which were sold out.

Thanks to the film he received several international awards, including the European 12 Star City Award in Paris, the Kerala International Film Festival in India, the Social World Film Festival, the Special Franco Fedeli Prize from SIULP and the Ferdinandea Prize from UNICEF Italy.

In 2016 he received the Special Prize of the 17th edition of the Premio Fedeli awarded by SIULP, the Italian Police Union, and was named “Personality of the Year” by the city of Crotone.

== Recent work ==
Since 2019, Borrelli has been part of the artist roster of Universal Music.

In July of the same year he released the single “L’Amor”, distributed by Universal Music Group, accompanied by a music video composed of animated GIF images conceived and produced by Borrelli. In 2020 he wrote, directed and starred in the music video for “Il cammino dell’anima” by Angelo Branduardi, and oversaw the artistic supervision of the European tour associated with the album of the same name.

From 2023 he has been testimonial in a Mulino Bianco advertising campaign themed around the 1980s, produced by Publicis. In 2026 he was chosen as the lead testimonial and on-screen face of Mail Boxes Etc.’s advertising campaign during the 2026 FIFA World Cup.

In 2026, he was included among the top forty in the ranking of the sexiest actors of the year ("Les acteurs les plus sexy en 2026") on the French-language film portal Cine974, based on public votes, alongside international stars such as Johnny Depp, Christian Bale, Keanu Reeves and Ben Affleck.

He is recognised for pioneering integrated authorship across acting, directing, writing and music.

== Style and achievements ==
Borrelli is associated with two records in the field of cinema and digital music:

- Through the film Eddy, he is the first artist who simultaneously held all key creative and production roles (eight) in a film, including those of director, screenwriter, lead actor, composer, performer, arranger and musician of the original music as well as author and performer of the soundtrack songs.
- The single L'Amor is the first music video distributed by a major composed exclusively of original animated GIFs.

== Filmography ==
=== Cinema ===
- Una volta sola, mai più, directed by Nicola Parolini
- Martino's Summer, directed by Massimo Natale
- Eddy, directed by Simone Borrelli
- We're in this Together, directed by Simone Borrelli

=== Television ===
- Quo vadis, baby?, directed by Gabriele Salvatores and Guido Chiesa
- Terapia d'urgenza, directed by Carmine Elia, Gianpaolo Tescari, Lucio Gaudino
- Anna e i cinque – second series, directed by Franco Amurri
- Camera Café, directed by Fabrizio Gasparetto

=== Music videos ===
- X tutta la notte (2010) directed by Simone Borrelli and Nicola Parolini
- Niente di diverso (2016) directed by Simone Borrelli
- Survive (2018) with UNICEF directed by Simone Borrelli
- L'Amor (2019) directed by Simone Borrelli
- Il cammino dell'anima by Angelo Branduardi (2020) directed by Simone Borrelli

== Theatre ==
- Romeo and Juliet by William Shakespeare (2000)
- Antigone by Sophocles (2001)
- Monsieur chasse! by Georges Feydeau (2002)
- Pericolosamente by Eduardo De Filippo (2002)
- La patente by Luigi Pirandello (2002)
- A Midsummer Night's Dream by William Shakespeare (2003)
- The Trojan War Will Not Take Place by Jean Giraudoux (2002)
- The Imaginary Invalid by Molière (2005)
- Tingel Tangel by Karl Valentin (2005)
- Spoon River and L'amica di nonna speranza by Edgar Lee Masters and Guido Gozzano (2006)
- Viaggio nella città di Zeta by Cesare Zavattini and Vittorio Franceschi (2006)
- The Stranger (monologue) by Albert Camus (2006), directed by Vittorio Franceschi
- Il bugiardo by Carlo Goldoni (2006)
- They by Stanislaw Ignacy Witkiewicz (2006)
- Wolfgang Amadeus Mozart by Miloš Forman (2007) / Teatro Comunale di Bologna, directed by Arturo Cannistrà
- Anonimo Veneziano by Giuseppe Berto, directed by Simone Borrelli (2007)
- Ocean Sea by Alessandro Baricco, directed by Simone Borrelli (2008)
- Eddy Tour by Simone Borrelli (2015-2022)

== Discography ==
=== Soundtracks ===
- 2011 – Venerdì Sera
- 2016 – Eddy Original Movie Soundtrack

=== Singles ===
- 2009 – X tutta la notte
- 2009 – Giselle
- 2012 – Il giorno di Natale
- 2016 – Niente di diverso
- 2018 – Survive
- 2019 – L'Amor

== Awards and accolades ==
Borrelli's film Eddy received support from Unicef, Médecins Sans Frontiers and Amnesty International, and was designated by the Council of Europe as an "Official Human Rights Film".

- European 12 Star City Award – Paris (France), for Eddy
- Ferdinandea Prize – UNICEF Italy, for Eddy
- Best International Film – International Film Festival of Kerala (India), for Eddy.
- Best Film (Jury Prize) – Social World Film Festival, for Eddy.
- Best Actor (Jury Prize) – Social World Film Festival, awarded to Borrelli for Eddy.
- Franco Fedeli Special Prize – SIULP , for Eddy.
- Person of the Year – City of Crotone, for Eddy.
- Sonora Prize for Eddy.
- European Film Festival – Starring Europe – American Cinematheque, Hollywood, United States, for Eddy.
- International Human Rights Film Festival, for Eddy.
- International Rozafa Anifest, for Eddy.
- Best Film – Foggia Film Festival, for Eddy.
