= The Guest Room (film) =

- Film poster
- Italian: La stanza
- Directed by: Stefano Lodovichi
- Written by: Stefano Lodovichi
- Produced by: Andrea Occhipinti
- Starring: Guido Caprino; Camilla Filippi; Edoardo Pesce
- Cinematography: Timoty Aliprandi
- Edited by: Roberto Di Tanna
- Music by: Giorgio Giampà
- Distributed by: Amazon Prime Video
- Release date: 4 January 2021
- Running time: 86 minutes
- Country: Italy
- Language: Italian

The Guest Room (Italian: La stanza) is a 2021 Italian thriller-drama film directed by Stefano Lodovichi. Produced by Lucky Red, the film was distributed on the Prime Video platform starting 4 January 2021. Outside Italy it was distributed by the same platform under the title The Guest Room.

== Production ==
During the lockdown imposed by the Italian government due to the COVID-19 pandemic, director Stefano Lodovichi has developed the intention to shoot a film on the phenomenon of hikikomori, boys who voluntarily choose to shut themselves up in their room without leaving it for any reason. The film should have been a documentary however, going on with the writing of the work, the director preferred to create a fictional story that dealt with the subject in such a way as to identify the reasons for this social phenomenon in the stimuli received within a family today. The choice to set the film entirely inside a house is functional in addressing these issues. Filming took place during the lockdown, for two weeks.

== Cast ==
- Guido Caprino as the guest
- Camilla Filippi as Stella
- Edoardo Pesce as Sandro
- Romeo Pellegrini as Giulio
