= The Perfect Life =

- Directed by: Lucio Pellegrini
- Starring: Pierfrancesco Favino; Vittoria Puccini; Stefano Accorsi
- Cinematography: Gogò Bianchi
- Edited by: Walter Fasano
- Music by: Gabriele Roberto
- Release date: 2011
- Running time: 102 minutes
- Country: Italy

The Perfect Life (Italian: La vita facile) is a 2011 Italian comedy film directed by Lucio Pellegrini. It was screened out of competition at the 2011 Montreal World Film Festival.

== Cast ==
- Pierfrancesco Favino: Mario
- Stefano Accorsi: Luca
- Vittoria Puccini: Ginevra
- Camilla Filippi: Elsa
- Ivano Marescotti: Sergio
- Angelo Orlando: Salvatore
- Djibril Kébé: Thomas

== See also ==
- List of Italian films of 2011
