= The Red Shadows =

- Directed by: Francesco Maselli
- Written by: Francesco Maselli
- Starring: Roberto Herlitzka; Valentina Carnelutti; Ennio Fantastichini; Arnoldo Foà; Lucia Poli; Luca Lionello
- Cinematography: Felice De Maria
- Music by: Giovanna Marini; Angelo Talocci
- Release date: 2009
- Language: Italian

The Red Shadows (Italian: Le ombre rosse) is a 2009 Italian drama film written and directed by Francesco Maselli.

It was screened out of competition at the 66th Venice International Film Festival.

== Cast ==
- Ennio Fantastichini as Varga
- Arnoldo Foà as Massimo
- Roberto Herlitzka as Sergio Siniscalchi
- Valentina Carnelutti as Margherita
- Flavio Parenti as Davide
- Lucia Poli as Vanessa
- Eugenia Costantini as Betta
- Luca Lionello as Stefano
- Carmelo Galati as Alessandro
- Veronica Gentili as Rossana
- Antonino Bruschetta as Conduttore TV1
- Roberto Citran as Bergonzi
- Laurent Terzieff as Director of Le Monde
- Ricky Tognazzi as Politician
