= Eddy (film) =

- Poster
- Screenplay by: Simone Borrelli
- Story by: Simone Borrelli
- Produced by: Daria Cimino; ProMuovi; Council of Europe
- Starring: Simone Borrelli; Astrid Meloni; Valentina Principi; Loubna Benrachid
- Cinematography: Dario Di Mella
- Edited by: Rosa Santoro
- Music by: Simone Borrelli
- Production companies: Zen Movie; Promuovi
- Distributed by: Council of Europe; Compagnia dello Ionio
- Release date: 15 October 2014 (Strasbourg)
- Running time: 30 minutes
- Country: Italy
- Language: Italian

Eddy is a 2014 Italian film written, directed, and scored by Simone Borrelli, who also starred in the film.

The film is supported by the presidency of the Council of Ministers of the Italian Republic and had an exclusive world premiere in Strasbourg on 15 October 2014, where it received the accolade of being Official Human Rights Movie 2015 from the Council of Europe.

The film is about violence against children, volunteer doctors, and terrorist attacks in Syria.

== Plot ==
Rodrigo is a young Italian surgeon who leaves Italy to volunteer at a field hospital in Syria, where there are a large number of innocent victims of violence of war as a result of the ongoing civil war. He was called to this location to help with as many of the resulting medical emergencies as possible.

Just before leaving his home in Italy, his girlfriend Sofia tells him she is expecting a baby, hoping to convince him to stay. Finding himself at a very important moment in his life, in which he is becoming a father for the first time, Rodrigo's determination to carry on with his commitment as a doctor causes an argument with Sofia. This argument results in Sofia unwillingly accepting Rodrigo's decision to leave.

Once Rodrigo arrives at the Syrian field hospital (located at the Syrian-Turkish border), he immediately becomes aware of the difficult place where he has ended up. He spends days witnessing the disturbing consequences of violence and finds himself saving primarily children, who continuously arrive at the hospital in critical condition. Here, Rodrigo learns about "the green parrots", little landmines disguised as parrot-shaped toys. These boobytraps are scattered all over the territory to attract unsuspecting victims who are mostly children.

One day, exhausted from having to watch the horror and violence as just a spectator and without intervening, Rodrigo loses his self-control and impulsively takes action in such a way that goes against the local code of ethics. After this forbidden action occurs, the equilibrium is destroyed, bringing all the characters to their inescapable destiny.

== Accolades ==
This film had an exclusive premiere screening for the 47 heads of state and their delegations of the Member States at the Palace of Europe in Strasbourg on 15 October 2014, where it was acclaimed as "Official Human Rights Movie 2015" by the Council of Europe.

Furthermore, through an official public notice of the State Secretariat (UCE FF 887/2014), the Italian Prime Minister, Matteo Renzi and the Presidency of the council of Ministers of the Italian Republic decided to give Simone Borrelli and Eddy their official high patronage for the film's high social, cultural and artistic significance.

The film has been translated and subtitled into over 10 languages with the support of the Alma Mater Studiorum at the University of Bologna.

== Institutional partners ==
Apart from being promoted by the Ministry of Education, University and Research, the film is also supported by prestigious International partners such as UNICEF, and NGOs such as Médecins Sans Frontières, International Red Cross and Red Crescent Movement and Amnesty International.

== Distribution ==
After being acclaimed as an "Official Human Rights Movie" at the exclusive premiere in Strasbourg, in 2015 Eddy was planned to be distributed in all of the 47 European states within the network of the Council of Europe.

== Production details ==
- Though Eddy is set in the Euphrates' valley in Syria, the film was shot entirely within the Province of Reggio Calabria.
- Eddy is a rare film project in the history of cinema in that just one artist, Simone Borrelli, created the film as the only scriptwriter, director and leading actor, while also being the only composer, arranger, musician of the scores and singer in the film's original soundtrack.
