= Camilla Filippi =

Italian actress

- Born: 13 October 1979 (age 45); Brescia, Italy
- Occupation: Actress

Camilla Filippi (born 13 October 1979) is an Italian film, stage and television actress.

== Life and career ==
Born in Brescia, Filippi started her career, when she was a teenager, appearing in a series of Barilla commercials. She made her acting debut in 1998, appearing in the television miniseries Costanza alongside Monica Guerritore. In 2001, she made her film debut in the low-budget horror The House of Chicken.

Also a visual artist, she held several exhibitions, notably at the 2015 Festival dei Due Mondi in Spoleto.

=== Personal life ===
Filippi is married to the film director Lucio Pellegrini. She suffered from bulimia nervosa for about twenty years.

== Filmography ==
=== Films ===
Year	Title	Role(s)	Notes
2000	Estate romana	Police officer	Cameo appearance
2003	Now or Never	Vanna	
2003	The Best of Youth	Sara Carati	
2003	Kiss Me First	Jane	
2004	The Life That I Want	Monica	
2005	Amatemi	Camilla	
2009	Feisbum - Il film	Giovanna	Segment: "Indian dream"
2009	The Right Thing	Serena	
2010	Unlikely Revolutionaries	Marta	
2010	Hayfever	Giovanna	
2011	The Perfect Life	Elsa	
2011	One Day More	Silvia	
2012	Viva l'Italia	Elena	
2012	Love Is Not Perfect	Roberta	
2013	Il mondo fino in fondo	Veronica	
2014	Amori elementri	Katerina's mother	
2014	Good for Nothing	Camilla Brandani	
2014	Banana	Emma Bondini	
2015	Deep in the Wood	Linda Weiss	
2019	Il grande passo	Carlotta	
2021	The Guest Room	Stella	
2024	Still Fabulous	Erika	

=== Television ===
Year	Title	Role(s)	Notes
1998	Costanza	Laura	Television movie
2000	Valeria medico legale	Lorella Lucidi	Main role (season 1); 9 episodes
2001	Compagni di scuola	Arianna Cirese	Main role; 26 episodes
2002	Stiamo bene insieme	Maria	Miniseries
2005	De Gasperi, l'uomo della speranza	Lucia De Gasperi	Television movie
2005	La notte breve	Young Lara	Television movie
2007	Le ragazze di San Ferdinando	Tosca Mogherini	Miniseries
2007	Il capitano	Angela Pasotti	Main role (season 2); 8 episodes
2009	La scelta di Laura	Rebecca Ricciardi	Main role; 12 episodes
2010	Tutti pazzi per amore	Valeria Guerrieri	Recurring role; 17 episodes
2013	Rossella	Erminia	2 episodes
2014	Una villa per due	Caterina	Television movie
2015	Ragion di Stato	Flavia	Miniseries
2015	Solo per amore	Irene Fiore	Main role (season 1); 10 episodes
2015	Anna e Yusef	Chiara	Television movie
2015–2018	Tutto può succedere	Cristina Bordiga	Main role; 42 episodes
2018	Thou Shalt Not Kill	Enrica	2 episodes
2019	Il silenzio dell'acqua	Roberta	Main role; 8 episodes
2019	The Trial	Linda Monaco	Main role; 8 episodes
2023	Sono Lillo	Claudia	Main role; 8 episodes
2023	Christian	Esther	Main role (season 2)
