= Enrico Maria Artale =

Italian filmmaker (born 1984)

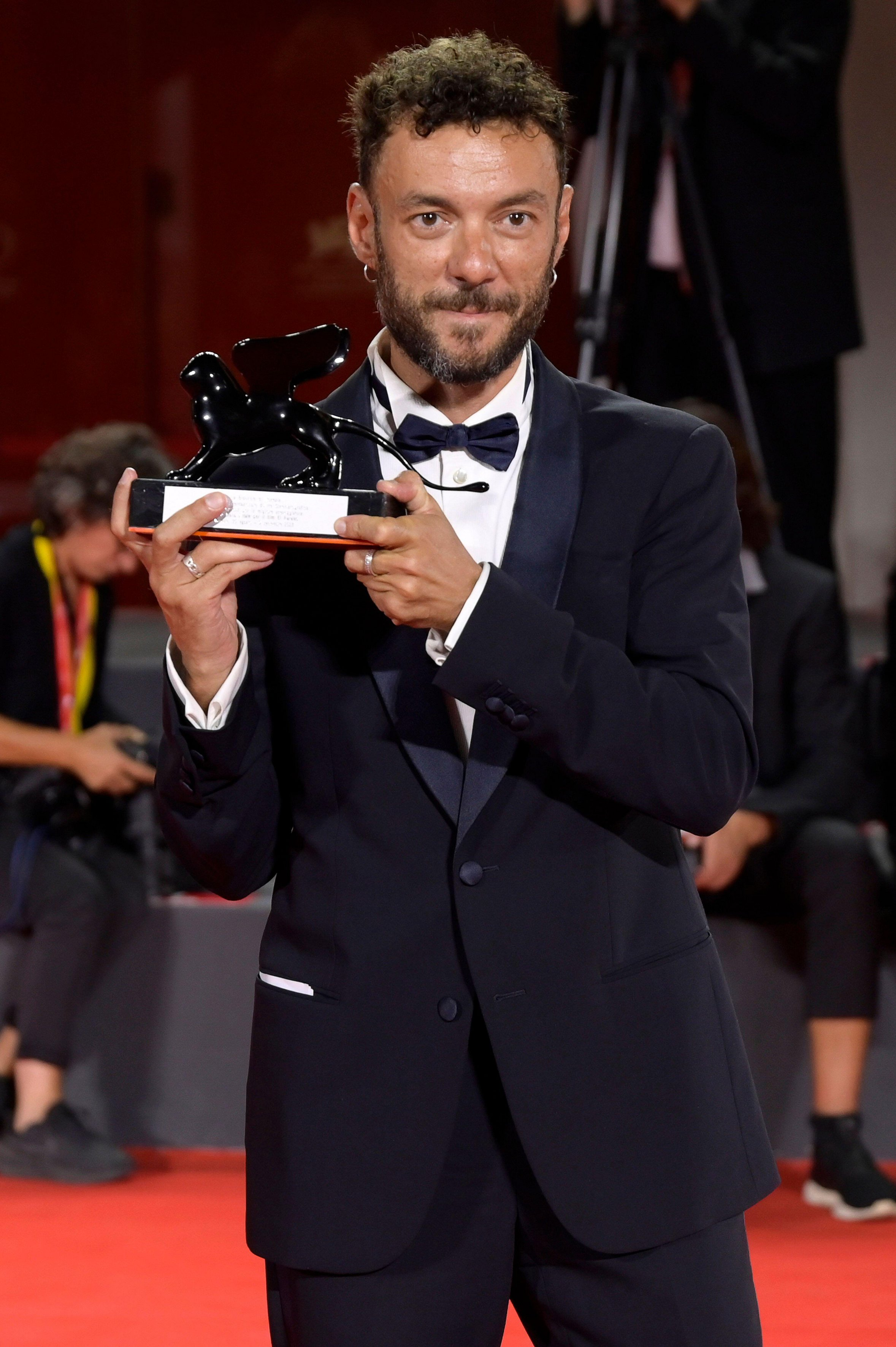
- Born: 7 June 1984 (age 41); Rome, Italy
- Occupation: Film director

Enrico Maria Artale (born 7 June 1984) is an Italian film director and screenwriter.

== Life and career ==
Born in Rome, Artale graduated in philosophy from the Sapienza University, and got a diploma in directing from the Centro Sperimentale di Cinematografia. After directing some experimental videos and documentary films, in 2013 he made his feature film debut with the rugby-themed The Third Half, which premiered at the 73rd Venice International Film Festival, being awarded the Pasinetti Award for best first work. In 2016, Artale directed the autobiographical documentary Saro, which premiered at the 34th Torino Film Festival. It was nominated at David di Donatello Awards for Best Documentary.

In 2024, after directing several episodes of the series Romulus, Artale directed the feature film El paraíso. The film was screened at the 80th Venice Film Festival, with Artale winning the Orizzonti award for best screenplay. For this film, Artale also got a David di Donatello nomination for Best Original Screenplay. In 2025, he directed the Canal+ series A Prophet, based on the Jacques Audiard's film with the same title.

== Filmography ==
- I Giganti dell'Aquila (documentary, 2009)
- Il respiro dell'arco (documentary, 2011)
- The Third Half (2013)
- Saro (documentary, 2016)
- El paraíso (2023)
