= Mohamed Zineddaine =

Moroccan-Italian film director and producer

- Born: January 1, 1957 (age 69); Oued Zem, Béni Mellal-Khénifra, Morocco
- Education: University of Bologna
- Occupation: Film director, producer and screenwriter

Mohamed Zineddaine (born 1 January 1957 in Oued Zem) is a Moroccan-Italian journalist, photographer, filmmaker, screenwriter and producer.

== Biography ==
=== Education ===
In 1983, he moved to France to study computer science in Nice. After a year, he moved to Bologna to study directing at the DAMS (Department of Art, Music and Performing Arts) at the University of Bologna.

== Partial filmography ==
=== Feature films ===
- 2004 : Risveglio (Réveil)
- 2008 : Ti ricordi di Adil? (Do You Remember Adil?)
- 2012 : Colère (Anger)
- 2018 : La Guérisseuse (The Healer)

=== Short films and documentaries ===
- 2002 : La vecchia ballerina
