= Il bene e il male =

- Genre: Crime drama
- Created by: Simone De Rita; Marta Storti
- Starring: Gianmarco Tognazzi; Bianca Guaccero; Antonia Liskova; Marco Falaguasta
- Country of origin: Italy
- No. of seasons: 1
- No. of episodes: 12

Production
- Running time: 50 minutes

Original release
- Network: Rai 1
- Release: January 12 – February 23, 2009

Il Bene e il Male is an Italian crime drama television series.

== See also ==
- List of Italian television series
