= Aquadro =

- Film poster
- Directed by: Stefano Lodovichi
- Written by: Stefano Lodovichi; Davide Orsini
- Produced by: Tommaso Arrighi
- Starring: Lorenzo Colombi; Maria Vittoria Barrella
- Cinematography: Benjamin Maier
- Edited by: Roberto Di Tanna
- Music by: Ivo Forer; Irene Hopfgartner; Klaus Leitner
- Distributed by: Rai Cinema
- Release date: April 2013
- Running time: 96 minutes
- Country: Italy
- Language: Italian

Aquadro is a 2013 Italian drama film directed by Stefano Lodovichi.

== Cast ==
- Lorenzo Colombi as Alberto
- Maria Vittoria Barrella as Amanda
- Ilaria Giachi as Nanà
- Gaia Igini as Barbara
