= Prisma (TV series) =

Italian teen drama television series (2022–2024)

- Amazon Prime Video poster
- Genre: Coming-of-age; Teen drama
- Created by: Alice Urciuolo; Ludovico Bessegato
- Written by: Ludovico Bessegato; Alice Urciuolo; Barbara Greco; Isotta Paccanelli
- Directed by: Ludovico Bessegato
- Starring: Mattia Carrano; Lorenzo Zurzolo; Caterina Forza; Chiara Bordi; Matteo Scattaretico; LXX Blood
- Country of origin: Italy
- Original language: Italian
- No. of seasons: 2
- No. of episodes: 16

Production
- Running time: 42–60 minutes
- Production company: Cross Productions

Original release
- Network: Amazon Prime Video
- Release: 20 September 2022 – 6 June 2024

Prisma is an Italian coming-of-age television series created by Alice Urciuolo and Ludovico Bessegato. The first season was released on Amazon Prime Video on 20 September 2022. The series was cancelled after two seasons in 2024.

== Premise ==
The series follows a group of teenagers from Latina, particularly a pair of identical twins, Andrea and Marco. It centers on issues including gender fluidity, gender norms, sexuality, bullying, self-harm, and drug dealing.

== Cast ==
- Mattia Carrano as Andrea/Marco
  - Roberto Di Palma as young Andrea/Marco
- Lorenzo Zurzolo as Daniele
- Caterina Forza as Nina
- Chiara Bordi as Carola
- Matteo Scattaretico as Ilo
- LXX Blood as Vittorio
- Zakaria Hamza as Sami
- Riccardo Afan de Rivera Costaguti as Boncio
- Leo Rivosecchi as Marcello
- Flavia Del Prete as Zelia
- Asia Patrignani as Jun
- Elena Falvella Capodaglio as Micol

== Episodes ==
=== Series overview ===
Series	Episodes	Originally released	
Series	Episodes	First released	Last released
1	8	20 September 2022	21 September 2022
2	8	6 June 2024	

=== Season 1 ===
No. overall	No. in season	Title	Duration	Original release date
1	1	"Red" (Rosso)	44 min	20 September 2022
Marco and Andrea are 16-year-old identical twins. Marco is shy and afraid to talk to Carola, a girl he likes, so Andrea pretends to be Marco to strike up a friendship with her. Marco was a swimmer, but after suffering an injury, he is unable to swim. Daniele, a boy who swam with Marco and is friends with Andrea, is talking to a girl from Turin that he met on social media but has never seen in person. The "girl" in question is actually Andrea behind a fake profile where he uploads faceless photos in women's clothing. Daniele presses the fake profile to send him a photo to verify her identity, so Andrea sends him a photo of his ex-girlfriend, Micol.
2	2	"Orange" (Arancione)	50 min	21 September 2022
Andrea tells his friend Raffa about the photo he sent to Daniele. Raffa reproaches Andrea and urges him to tell the truth. Micol is now in a relationship with Nina, Andrea's classmate. At a party, Daniele shows all his friends, including Andrea, a screenshot of the photo sent to him by the fake profile. Sara, a girl at the party, recognizes the girl in the photo as Micol, as they had met in a library in Sabaudia. Daniele messages the fake profile and asks her if she had recently been to Sabaudia.
3	3	"Yellow" (Giallo)	42 min	21 September 2022
Andrea denies ever having been to Sabaudia. He goes on a date with Nina. Daniele and his friend Ilo have to shoot a music video, so they ask Marco for help since he has a video camera. Marco finds out that Daniele went out with Carola the year prior. Shortly after, Marco kisses Carola.
4	4	"Green" (Verde)	43 min	21 September 2022
Behind the fake profile, Andrea confesses to Daniele that he is not from Turin and deletes the profile altogether. Angry at this, Daniele begins to investigate the girl's identity by asking Sara about her. Meanwhile, Marco and Carola have sex.
5	5	"Blue" (Blu)	43 min	21 September 2022
Daniele searches for Micol in Sabaudia. He finally finds her, though she denies knowing him and walks away. At the party for the launch of Daniele's music video, Carola, in an attempt to console a drunk Daniele drunk, has sex with him, though she regrets it immediately.
6	6	"Indigo" (Indaco)	43 min	21 September 2022
Carola, not wanting to be recognized at the pharmacy, asks Nina to help her buy the morning-after pill. Andrea and Nina go to Rome to attend a literary meeting with a transgender poet who invites them to a queer event in the evening. Andrea kisses Nina and the two end up having sex.
7	7	"Purple" (Viola)	45 min	21 September 2022
Andrea returns to Latina and tells his friends that he slept with Nina. When he finds out that Daniele slept with Carola, he starts a fight with Daniele to defend his brother. The police intervene and, finding drugs on Daniele, take the boys to the station. The boys are released but Andrea's father, fearing that the drugs belonged to his son, searches through Andrea's room. He finds a trunk full of drugs that Andrea had been selling. Meanwhile, Micol sees Daniele's music video and recognizes him as the boy who stopped her at school. She calls Andrea to ask if he knows him, but Andrea lies and says that he doesn't.
8	8	"White" (Bianco)	60 min	21 September 2022
Daniele is convinced by his friends that there is nothing wrong with trying alternative experiences, even with boys. He writes to the email address of the fake profile and asks to meet the person behind the account, regardless of gender. Andrea confides to Raffa that he is scared to reveal himself to Daniele. Zelia's brother accidentally posts a video that shows Carola having sex with Daniele on the night of the party. Andrea accepts the meeting with Daniele and they both get on the same bus to go to the meeting place. On the bus, Andrea plays a song that makes it clear to Daniele that he was the person behind the fake profile. The episode ends with a shot of their empty seats on the bus, not revealing whether the boys exited together or separately.

=== Season 2 ===
No. overall	No. in season	Title	Duration	Original release date
9	1	"Beige" (Beige)	46 min	6 June 2024
10	2	"Ochre" (Ocra)	41 min	6 June 2024
11	3	"Emerald" (Smeraldo)	46 min	6 June 2024
12	4	"Brown" (Marrone)	46 min	6 June 2024
13	5	"Turquoise" (Celeste)	41 min	6 June 2024
14	6	"Cyan" (Ciano)	41 min	6 June 2024
15	7	"Rose" (Rosa)	47 min	6 June 2024
16	8	"Black" (Nero)	62 min	6 June 2024

== Production ==
Prisma was created by Alice Urciuolo and Skam Italia showrunner Ludovico Bessegato. It was produced by Cross Productions, which is also the production company of Skam Italia. It was the fourth originally-produced Italian television series released by Amazon Prime Video, after Vita da Carlo, Monterossi, and Bang Bang Baby.

In mid-2023, Amazon MGM Studios announced that the series had been renewed for a second season; the announcement was accompanied by a photo of Mattia Carrano and Lorenzo Zurzolo backstage. Filming began in June 2023 in Latina and was completed by August 2023.

== Release ==
Its first two episodes premiered on 10 August 2022 at the Locarno Film Festival. The pilot was released on Amazon Prime Video on 20 September 2022, with the remaining seven episodes being released the following day. The second season premiered on 6 June 2024, with all eight episodes being released simultaneously. In anticipation of the season premiere, Prime Video Italia released promotional images on 27 March 2024.

The series was cancelled after two seasons on 11 September 2024.

== Awards and nominations ==
Year	Award	Category	Result	Ref.
2023	Nastri d'Argento Grandi Serie	Best Dramedy	Won	
