= Terapia d'urgenza =

- Country of origin: Italy
- No. of seasons: 1
- No. of episodes: 18

Original release
- Network: Rai 2
- Release: 2008 – 2009

Terapia d'urgenza is an Italian television series.

== Cast ==
- Rodolfo Corsato: Riccardo Malosti
- Antonella Fattori: Cristiana Gandini
- Cesare Bocci: Sergio Danieli
- Simone Borrelli: Mauro Morbello
- Milena Miconi: Laura Costa
- Sergio Muniz: Nicola Palumbo
- Daniela Scarlatti: Giulia Graziosi
- Marco Basile: Valerio Santamaria
- Alessia Barela: Marina Ranieri Del Colle
- Max Pisu: Rocco Cannizzaro
- Elisabetta Rocchetti: Esther Bruno

== See also ==
- List of Italian television series
