= Stefano Lodovichi =

Italian film director and screenwriter

- Born: 31 August 1983 (age 43); Grosseto, Tuscany, Italy
- Education: University of Siena
- Occupations: Film director, screenwriter
- Years active: 2007–present

Stefano Lodovichi (born 31 August 1983) is an Italian film director and screenwriter.

== Life and career ==
Born in Grosseto in 1983, Lodovichi graduated in film criticism and cinematic language methodologies at the University of Siena. He began working in the film industry in his hometown, collaborating with directors such as Carlo Virzì and Francesco Falaschi.

In 2007, he wrote and directed his first short film, No End, produced with support from the University of Siena. Two years later, he made the short Dueditre. In 2011, he worked as assistant director for Rolando Colla on Summer Games and directed the segment "Figli di Dio" in the collective film Il pranzo di Natale, presented out of competition at the Rome Film Festival. In 2012, he directed the documentary Pascoli a Barga, starring Giuseppe Battiston. During these years, Lodovichi also made commercials—for AVIS, Assolombarda, and McDonald's—and music videos for artists including Mondo Marcio, Beatrice Antolini, and Quartiere Coffee.

His first feature film, Aquadro, produced by Mood Film and Rai Cinema, was released in 2013. In 2015, he released his second feature, the thriller Deep in the Wood, produced by Sky Cinema. His subsequent works include the first season of Rai 2 crime series Cacciatore: The Hunter (2018) and Mediaset courtroom drama The Trial (2019).

In 2020, he directed the film The Guest Room, released on Prime Video in January 2021. The next year, Lodovichi directed the Sky Atlantic series Christian, also serving as creative producer. The second season, released in 2023, includes his contributions to the story and screenplay.

In 2025, Lodovichi directed the crime drama film The Big Fake, starring Pietro Castellitto.

== Personal life ==
Lodovichi married actress Camilla Filippi on 21 September 2019.

== Filmography ==
=== Film ===
Year	Title	Notes
2007	No End	Short film
2009	Due di tre	Short film
2011	Il pranzo di Natale	Segment "Figli di Dio"
2012	Pascoli a Barga	Documentary
2013	Aquadro	Also writer
2015	Deep in the Wood	Also writer
2021	The Guest Room	Also writer
2025	The Big Fake	

=== Television ===
Year	Title	Network	Notes
2018	Cacciatore: The Hunter	Rai 2	6 episodes (season 1)
2019	The Trial	Canale 5	8 episodes
2022–2023	Christian	Sky Atlantic	11 episodes; also creative producer and writer

=== Music videos ===
Title	Artist(s)	Release date
"Libera romantica"	Bohemia	9 June 2009
"Sweet Aroma"	Quartiere Coffee	15 November 2010
"Uan"	Formiche nell'Orto	18 December 2010
"This Is Not a Test"	Lapingra	11 March 2011
"Pamphlet"	Carlot-ta	14 March 2011
"Caffeine"	Quartiere Coffee	30 July 2011
"Solo un disegno circolare"	Lapingra	24 April 2012
"La paura"	Gran Turismo Veloce	24 January 2013
"Vertical Love"	Beatrice Antolini	10 March 2014
"A denti stretti"	Mondo Marcio	25 March 2014
