= Lucio Pellegrini =

Italian director and screenwriter (born 1965)

- Born: 20 October 1965 (age 60); Asti, Italy
- Occupations: Director; Screenwriter

Lucio Pellegrini (born 20 October 1965) is an Italian director and screenwriter.

== Early life ==
On 20 October 1965, Pellegrini was born in Asti, Italy.

== Career ==
Pellegrini started his career in 1992 as a television writer, collaborating with RAI, Mediaset and MTV. After directing a short film (Biodegradabile, 1997) and several commercial shorts, in 1999 he made his feature film debut with the comedy film E allora mambo!, which got him a nomination for Silver Ribbon for Best Director.

== Filmography ==
- E allora mambo! (1999)
- Tandem (2000)
- Now or Never (2003)
- La vita è breve ma la giornata è lunghissima (co-directed with Gianni Zanasi, 2005)
- Unlikely Revolutionaries (2010)
- The Perfect Life (2011)
- È nata una star? (2012)
