= Sergio Pierattini =

Italian actor and playwright (born 1958)

- Pierattini in 2000
- Born: 27 July 1958 (age 68); Sondrio, Italy
- Occupations: Actor, playwright
- Years active: 1982–present

Sergio Pierattini (born 27 July 1958) is an Italian actor and playwright.

== Life and career ==
Born in Sondrio, Lombardy, Pierattini grew up in Siena, Tuscany, where his parents, his mother from Valtellina and his father from Volterra, had moved in 1962. He began his theatrical training at the city's Piccolo Teatro before being admitted to the National Academy of Dramatic Arts Silvio D'Amico in Rome in 1979, graduating in 1982. After working as a stage actor, he made his debut as a playwright in 1989 with the monologue Silvano. He subsequently established a successful career in theatre and radio, collaborating with playwright Roberto Cavosi and writing numerous theatrical works and radio dramas, including the programme Teatrogiornale for Rai Radio 3.

He received the 2007 Flaiano Prize for Il raggio bianco, the 2008 Riccione Prize for Un mondo perfetto and the 2009 National Association of Theatre Critics award for Il ritorno. His monologue La Maria Zanella, written for actress Maria Paiato, earned her the 2005 Ubu Award for Best Actress. Since 2005, he has also taught radio dramaturgy at the Centro Sperimentale di Cinematografia. His later work includes the stage adaptation of Pupi Avati's Christmas Present (2018) and Molière's Amphitryon (2019).

Pierattini made his television debut in 1990 on Club 92, a variety show hosted by Gigi Proietti and Giancarlo Magalli on Rai 2. The following year, he made his film debut in Alessandro Benvenuti's The Party's Over. He appeared in several films, including Mario Monicelli's Dear Goddamned Friends (1994), Ugo Chiti's The Second Wife (1998), and Piuma (2016) by Roan Johnson. He also made a brief appearance in Spider-Man: Far From Home (2019), playing a Venetian glassblower.

From 2013 onwards, he has also appeared in the television series Murders at Barlume, playing the recurring character of Mario Aloisi.

== Selected filmography ==
- The Party's Over (1991)
- Dear Goddamned Friends (1994)
- With Closed Eyes (1994)
- Only You (1994)
- The Second Wife (1998)
- Shooting the Moon (1998)
- A cavallo della tigre (2002)
- 4-4-2: Il gioco più bello del mondo (2005)
- A Question of the Heart (2009)
- La passione (2010)
- The Ages of Love (2011)
- The First on the List (2011)
- How Strange to Be Named Federico (2013)
- The State-Mafia Pact (2014)
- Piuma (2016)
- The Stolen Caravaggio (2018)
- The Guest (2018)
- Se son rose (2018)
- C'è tempo (2019)
- Spider-Man: Far From Home (2019)
- Three Floors (2021)
- The Desired War (2022)
- Caro mondo crudele (2026)
