= Murders at Barlume =

- I delitti del BarLume
- Genre: Crime comedy
- Based on: Characters and stories by Marco Malvaldi
- Written by: Francesco Bruni; Marco Malvaldi; Cosimo Calamini; Davide Lantieri; Roan Johnson; Ottavia Madeddu; Carlotta Massimi
- Directed by: Eugenio Cappuccio; Roan Johnson; Milena Cocozza; Marco Teti
- Starring: Filippo Timi; Lucia Mascino; Carlo Monni; Atos Davini; Massimo Paganelli; Marcello Marziali; Enrica Guidi; Paolo Cioni; Alessandro Benvenuti; Michele Di Mauro; Guglielmo Favilla; Daniele Marmi; Stefano Fresi; Corrado Guzzanti; Marco Messeri
- Country of origin: Italy
- Original language: Italian
- No. of seasons: 13
- No. of episodes: 30

Production
- Running time: 90–100 minutes
- Production companies: Palomar; Sky Studios

Original release
- Network: Sky Cinema
- Release: 11 November 2013 – present

Murders at Barlume (Italian: I delitti del BarLume) is an Italian television series produced by Palomar and broadcast by Sky Cinema since 11 November 2013. It is based on the fictional characters and stories created by Italian writer Marco Malvaldi in his crime novel series I romanzi del BarLume.

Set in the fictional Tuscan seaside town of Pineta, the series follows Massimo Viviani, a bar owner who becomes involved in solving murders with the help of the local police commissioner and a group of elderly regular customers.

== Cast ==
=== Main ===
- Filippo Timi as Massimo Viviani (season 1–13)
- Lucia Mascino as Vittoria Fusco (season 1–13)
- Carlo Monni as Ampelio Viviani (season 1)
- Atos Davini as Pilade Del Tacca (season 1–13)
- Massimo Paganelli as Aldo Griffa (season 1–13)
- Marcello Marziali as Gino Rimediotti (season 1–11) (Note: Despite the actor's death in November 2023, Marziali remains credited as a main cast member for seasons 12 and 13, although he does not appear in either season.)
- Enrica Guidi as Tiziana Guazzelli (season 1–13)
- Paolo Cioni as Marco Pardini, known as Marchino (season 1–13)
- Alessandro Benvenuti as Emo Bandinelli (season 2–present)
- Guglielmo Favilla as Andrea Govoni (season 3–13, recurring season 2)
- Michele Di Mauro as Gianluigi Maria Tassone (season 4–13)
- Stefano Fresi as Giuseppe Battaglia, known as Beppe (season 5–13)
- Corrado Guzzanti as Paolo Pasquali (season 5–13)
- Daniele Marmi as Daniele Cioni (season 6–13, recurring season 1–5)
- Marco Messeri as Cosimo Guazzelli (season 11–13)

=== Recurring ===
- Olga Rossi as Laura Bandinelli (season 1–3, 9, 13)
- Sergio Pierattini as Mario Aloisi (season 1, 4–5, 9, 10, 12–13)
- Alessandro Giallocosta as Pigi Cecchi (season 2, 7, 12–13)
- Claudio Bigagli as Walter Carli (season 2–3)
- Claudio Marmugi as Marmugi (season 2–5, 9, 11–13)
- Alessandro Gelli as Vladimiro Checcacci (season 3–13)
- Valeria Vitti as Foschina Rimediotti (season 3–6, 11–13)
- Patrizia Salutij as Mrs. Grilli (season 3, 5, 7, 10)
- Mara Maionchi as the hairdresser (season 4–5)
- Pietro Ragusa as Andrea Paletti (season 4, 8, 13)
- Glaucia Paola Virdone as Susanita Morales (Note: Susanita is portrayed briefly by Angelica Lucia Lopez Monsalve in season 8.) (season 4, 12–13)
- Bobo Rondelli as Mariano Marini (season 5, 7)
- Lorenzo Frediani as Gianni Aloisi (season 5, 10)
- Alessio Sardelli as Piero Valtriani (season 5, 8)
- Melissa Anna Bartolini (Note: Bartolini also appeared in season 1 as a TV reporter.) as Anna Rusic (season 6, 10–13)
- Ludovico Fiorentini as Ampelio Jr. (season 6–13)
- Mariela Garriga as Carmen (season 6, 13)
- Roan Johnson (Note: Johnson also appeared in season 2 as a friend of Marchino and in season 4 as a passerby.) as lawyer Roby Falcucci (season 6, 8, 11–12)
- Alice Torriani as Agnese Ghirardelli (season 7, 13)
- Francesca Orsini as Chantal (season 7, 12)
- Jerryann Desaya Johara Liguori as Bettina (season 8, 10–13)
- Michele Crestacci as Luchino (season 10–13)
- Massimo Bianchi as Rudy Biagini (season 10, 12)
- Francesco Motta as a billboard clerk (season 10–12)
- Alessia Spinelli as Franca Brogialdi (season 10–13)
- Francesco Rossini as Carmine (season 11–13)
- Leonardo Cesaroni as Osvaldo (season 11–12)
- Clara Barbetti as Marina Battaglia (season 11–13)
- Alex Lucchesi as Jimmy (season 11–12)
- Lúcia Lisboa as Dominga (season 12–13)
- Marina Rocco as Olivia (season 13)

=== Guest ===
- Manuelita Baylon as Wilma Del Tacca (season 1)
- Massimo Salvianti as Brother Adriano (season 1)
- Mariella Valentini as Chinzica Carratori (season 1)
- Paolo Pierobon as Dr. Berton (season 1)
- Maurizio Lombardi as Rocco / Mago Atlante (season 1, 3)
- Ilaria Giachi as Giulia Puntoni (season 2)
- Massimo Reale as Angelo Puntoni (season 2)
- Chiara Paoli as Alina Guidi (season 2)
- Francesco Colella as Ciccio (season 2)
- Silvia D'Amico as Lisa Sandrini (season 2)
- Valentina Banci as Arianna (season 2)
- Alessandro Federico as Thomas (season 3)
- Denis Fasolo as Claudio Benedetti (season 3)
- Paolo De Vita as Gianfranco Benedetti (season 3)
- Alessio Montagnani as Niccolò Carli (season 3)
- Massimiliano Vado as the henchman (season 3)
- Piera Degli Esposti as Piera (season 4)
- Emanuele Maria Basso as Leonardo Chiezzi (season 4)
- Pietro De Silva as De Matteis (season 4)
- Dario Ballantini as Fioretto (season 4)
- Simone Colombari as Emiliano Bernardini (season 4)
- Crisula Stafida as Penelope (season 5)
- Francesca Antonelli (season 5)
- Rinat Khismatouline as Eugenio (season 5)
- Cristina Cepraga as Olga (season 5)
- Roberto Farnesi as Tiziana's date (season 6)
- Sonia Scotti as Donna Rosa (season 6)
- Sergio Meogrossi as the Teramo killer (season 6)
- Clizia Fornasier as Viola Calcaterra (season 7)
- Raffaella Afeltra as Luisa Valente (season 8)
- Barbara Pieruccetti as Paola Valtriani (season 8)
- Frank Crudele as Frank (season 9)
- Thomas Kadman as Jack (season 9)
- Alfio Sorbello as Vito Cannavò (season 9)
- Annalisa Arena as Francesca Niccolai (season 9)
- Lorenzo de Moor as Matteo Corradi (season 9)
- Giordana Faggiano as Lidia (season 9)
- Alessandra Frabetti as Matteo's mother (season 9)
- Laura Mazzi as Tallarini (season 10)
- Paolo Lorimer as Condorelli (season 10)
- Giovanni Prosperi as Gianni Vagelli (season 10)
- Cristian Giammarini (season 10)
- Piero Massimo Macchini (season 10)
- Barbara Enrichi as the doctor's sister (season 10)
- Laura Locatelli as Clarissa Pratesi (season 11)
- Giulia Rupi as Giulia Cini (season 11)
- Nicola Fanucchi as Gianfranco Lenzi (season 11)
- Sandro Veronesi as the fisherman (season 11)
- Orietta Berti as herself (season 11)
- Liyu Jin as Li's sister (season 12)
- Concita De Gregorio as Pierfrancesco's sister (season 12)
- Martín Castrogiovanni as the osteopath (season 12)
- Paola Iezzi as herself (season 13)

== Production ==
The series was adapted from Marco Malvaldi's crime novels, published by Sellerio Editore, and produced by the Italian production company Palomar for Sky Cinema. The first season was directed by Eugenio Cappuccio. From the second season onwards, Roan Johnson became the main director, with Milena Cocozza also directing episodes in later seasons. The first nine seasons consisted of two television films each, while the tenth season onwards consists of three films per season.

The series has been filmed in several locations in Tuscany, with Marciana Marina, on the island of Elba, serving as the main location for the fictional town of Pineta. Additional filming has taken place in Follonica and Piombino.

== Episodes ==
Season	Episode	Title	Original air date
1	1	"Il re dei giochi"	11 November 2013
1	2	"La carta più alta"	17 November 2013
2	3	"La tombola dei troiai"	11 May 2015
2	4	"La briscola in cinque"	18 May 2015
3	5	"Il telefono senza fili"	11 January 2016
3	6	"Azione e reazione"	18 January 2016
4	7	"Aria di mare"	9 January 2017
4	8	"La loggia del cinghiale"	16 January 2017
5	9	"Un due tre stella!"	8 January 2018
5	10	"La battaglia navale"	15 January 2018
6	11	"Il battesimo di Ampelio"	25 December 2018
6	12	"Hasta Pronto Viviani"	1 January 2019
7	13	"Donne con le palle"	11 January 2020
7	14	"Ritorno a Pineta"	18 January 2020
8	15	"Mare forza quattro"	11 January 2021
8	16	"Tana libera tutti"	18 January 2021
9	17	"Compro oro"	17 January 2022
9	18	"A bocce ferme"	24 January 2022
10	19	"Indovina chi?"	9 January 2023
10	20	"Resort Paradiso"	16 January 2023
10	21	"E allora zumba!"	23 January 2023
11	22	"Il pozzo dei desideri"	12 January 2024
11	23	"La girata"	19 January 2024
11	24	"Sopra la panca"	26 January 2024
12	25	"Non è un paese per bimbi"	13 January 2025
12	26	"Gatte da pelare"	20 January 2025
12	27	"Sasso carta forbici"	27 January 2025
13	28	"Il gioco delle coppie"	5 January 2026
13	29	"Il matrimonio di Pasquali"	12 January 2026
13	30	"La danza dello squalo"	19 January 2026

== Music ==
The opening theme song, "Fidati di me", is performed by Italian singer Simona Molinari.

== Awards and nominations ==
- Nastro d'Argento
  - 2023 – Nomination for Best Comedy Television Series.
- Italian Global Series Festival
  - 2025 – Multiple nominations, including Best Comedy Series, Best Direction, Best Screenplay and acting categories.
