= Eveless =

- Film poster
- Directed by: Antonio Padovan
- Written by: Dolores Diaz & Antonio Padovan
- Produced by: Jackie C. Lin; Vin Kridakorn, Greg Engbrecht;(executive producers); Amy Ma, Mong Hui Kao (co-producers)
- Starring: Vin Kridakorn; Greg Engbrecht
- Cinematography: Dominick Sivilli
- Edited by: Greg Zappile
- Production companies: JAJ Productions; MA Studios
- Distributed by: StudioCanal (UK); Unstable Ground, Inc. (Galaxy of Horrors)
- Release date: July 19, 2016 (Fantasia)
- Running time: 6 minutes 12 seconds
- Country: United States
- Language: English

Eveless is a 2016 American short science-fiction horror film directed and co-written by Antonio Padovan. It follows two men in a world without women as they attempt to create one using only the limited resources they have gathered. Actors Vin Kridakorn and Greg Engbrecht also served as the short's executive producers.

In 2017, Eveless received a general theatrical release through its inclusion in the Canadian science-fiction horror anthology filmGalaxy of Horrors.

== Plot ==
Sometime around the year 2525, men remain, but women have vanished. A world conglomerate called Chromocorp has taken control of human reproduction; it is no longer possible for humans to procreate independently. In a remote location, two desperate researchers have dared to resist. The first (Vin Kridakorn) prepares to conduct a radical experimental procedure on the second (Greg Engbrecht), who is, somehow, visibly in the very late stages of pregnancy. Both are very agitated, and the Caesarian section which takes place is a bloody and unpleasant experience for both surgeon and patient (who may die from the procedure). The baby is delivered safely, but joy turns to despair as, it's a boy, and not the girl they had hoped for. The newborn is tossed into a fish tank.

== Cast ==
- Vin Kridakorn
- Greg Engbrecht
- Eric Folks (voice of radio host, uncredited)

== Production ==
=== Background and development ===
Vin Kridakorn's background was in music education before he decided to study acting at the New York Film Academy, where he first met Jackie C. Lin, who at the time was directing films, and for whom he auditioned. Through Lin, he met fellow student Antonio Padovan and appeared as a background character in one of Padovan's early films. Kridakorn went on to act in plays, on television, and in film, and eventually decided he would like to produce a film, and, having raised the funds for a project that fell through, went in search of another, contacting Lin. Together they looked for directors and re-connected with Padovan, who told them he had a script about "two guys, and one of them is having a baby." The script said nothing about where or why this was happening; Kridakorn was intrigued, and found the prospect of playing one of the parts exciting, and moreover, Padovan's first horror short, Jack Attack (2013) had done very well, having been selected by more than fifty festivals and winning more than thirty awards.

The story was fleshed out, and set in a future world without women. Kridakorn's job initially was to "bring everyone on board", which now included Lin; once he had recruited his co-executive producer Greg Engbrecht (who also plays opposite him in Eveless), the core team had been assembled. Kridakorn initially had misgivings about the film's brevity, but Padovan insisted that it had to be "tight" so they could focus on making a quality film on a limited budget.

=== Casting and filming ===
Kridakorn and Engbrecht were originally cast with the opposite parts they play in the finished film; after a number of rehearsals, Padovan insisted that they switch roles.

Principal photography took place over two days, in New York City, like most of Padovan's other films, usually in the West Village where he has resided since leaving his native Italy in 2007. Editor Greg Zappile generously worked at a lower rate of pay than he normally would have, and had to devote time in addition to his full-time job in order to do it, so the editing took a lot of time.

== Release ==
Eveless had its premiere at the Fantasia International Film Festival in Montréal on July 16, 2016, and played in its native US at such film festivals as Shriekfest, HollyShorts, the Chicago Horror Film Festival, and the Brooklyn Horror Film Festival.

=== Anthology film ===
Eveless is included in the 2017 Canadian science-fiction horror anthology film Galaxy of Horrors, which comprises eight shorts within a larger narrative frame in which a man awakens from a cryogenic sleep pod and is forced to watch the shorts as entertainment while his damaged life-support runs out. The anthology film had its premiere in Toronto at Imagine Cinemas Carlton on March 1, 2017. the feature was conceived by Little Terrors short films festival founder Justin McConnell, who directed the narrative frame, and Indiecan Entertainment's Avi Federgreen. The production is the second collaboration between Rue Morgue Cinema and Little Terrors, following Minutes Past Midnight.

=== Home media and streaming ===
Eveless is currently available for viewing in its entirety on YouTube.

The Galaxy of Horrors anthology was released on DVD and special edition Blu-ray in 2017. The anthology was made available through various video on demand options on the IndieCan Entertainment website, on March 7, 2017, and on Amazon Prime.

== Reception ==
=== Critical response ===
Critics have generally responded positively to Eveless, appreciating its minimalist dystopian setting, gritty look and visceral content.

Alexandra Heller-Nicholas calls the short film "confident" and minimalist, stating it "packs an unforgettable punch", describing it as a "gritty, grotty dystopian nightmare world" in which the two men "battle against nature" in a struggle "to keep civilisation going on their own." Chris Evangelista says the film "is suitably unpleasant — you can practically feel the dirt forming under your fingernails as you watch this thing." Joe Bendel compares the short to Joan Rivers' Rabbit Test, "except more apocalyptic and dystopian." He also suggests it would be well paired with Pablo González's Cord:

because both present dark but decidedly non-sterile visions of the future. In this case, the confined, claustrophobic setting is literally overflowing with intriguingly detailed yet vaguely disturbing props and trappings, representing quite a triumph from production designer Roxy Martinez. The nervous energy of its two-handed cast of Vin Kridakorn and Greg Engbrecht aptly completes the unsettling and unbalanced picture. At a mere seven minutes, Eveless is quite a distinctive piece of world-building.

Reviewing the film as part of the Galaxy of Horrors anthology, Carl Fisher calls it "visceral" and suggests "the grittiness of the environment & excellent performances really sell it", along with "believable characters & acting". Jay Seaver, who enjoys "gross-out" films, gives the short 3 stars out of 4: "it sketches out an outlandish premise, serves up a fair amount of stuff that's not for the squeamish, and has a sense of its own absurdity." Jay Clarke was impressed by the film's intimacy and ambition in creating a substantial world in a short period of time.

Richard Sopko says that Eveless relies solely on the unexpected and shock, calling it "a crude and juvenile short that thinks it's being edgy but comes off as laughable."

=== Audience response ===
Being close to the film themselves, the filmmakers were not sure about the result until they started to see audiences "squirming" in response to it, enjoying it and asking questions about it.

=== Accolade ===
- Best Editing, New York Premiere Film Festival (2017)
