= Fino a qui tutto bene =

Fino a qui tutto bene may refer to:

- a 2010 album by Marracash
- a 2014 film also known as So Far So Good
