= Alex Vincent =

Alex or Alexander Vincent may refer to:

- Alex Vincent (actor) (born 1981), American actor, writer and sound engineer
- Alex Vincent (drummer) (born 1965), American drummer
- Alex Vincent, actress in Socks and Cakes

== See also ==
- John Bates (neurophysiologist) (John Alexander Vincent Bates, 1918–1993), English neurophysiologist
