= Jack Attack (film) =

- Film poster
- Directed by: Bryan Norton & Antonio Padovan
- Written by: Bryan Norton & Antonio Padovan
- Produced by: Lucia Bellini; Joseph Zaso
- Starring: Helen Rogers; Tyler Rossell
- Cinematography: Gordon Yu
- Edited by: Mike Maclean
- Music by: Marco Werba
- Production company: Brickwall Productions
- Distributed by: Magnolia, Fearnet, RAI, Mediaset
- Release date: July 18, 2013 (Fantasia)
- Running time: >9 minutes
- Country: United States
- Language: English

Jack Attack is a 2013 American short holiday horror film about a babysitter (Helen Rogers), her charge Jack (Tyler Rossell), and parasitic pumpkins, written and directed by Bryan Norton and Antonio Padovan, who were also responsible, respectively, for special make-up and mechanical effects, and set design. The short was selected by more than a hundred festivals internationally and won more than thirty awards, and was selected for two anthology films in the US: Seven Hells (2014), and All Hallows' Eve 2 (2015).

== Plot ==
On Hallowe'en night, in a West Village townhouse, babysitter Elizabeth carves a Jack O'Lantern out of a pumpkin with the help of Jack, the boy she is looking after, his terrier Oscar barking and watching excitedly. She is vexed because her boyfriend Elliott is running late. The job done, she puts the seeds on a tray and cooks them in the oven. After, all three of them eat a few seeds, Jack begins to choke. Elizabeth tries to perform the Heimlich maneuver but fails and the boy passes out. Not knowing what else to do, she takes a knife and attempts to perform a tracheotomy so he can breathe. Blood spurts when she cuts a hole in his neck, and she notices something that may be the seed and attempts to dig it out with the knife; it turns out to be a long vine. Jack's abdomen swells underneath his shirt and explodes. Horrified, Elizabeth notices her own belly beginning to swell. Using the knife, she cuts across it in the manner of a Caesarean section, and pumpkins and thick vines explode from her body, and her head slumps down. Oscar whines. Outside, Elliott finally arrives and enters the townhouse. He is heard calling for her briefly, and vines are seen creeping quickly within across the windows.

== Cast ==
- Helen Rogers as Elizabeth
- Tyler Rossell as Jack
- Brazen (dog) as Oscar
- Steven Anderson Jr. as Elliott

== Production ==
=== Background and inspiration ===
Bryan Norton had been Antonio Padovan's directing teacher at the New York Film Academy, where Padovan directed his first two short films, Socks and Cakes and his student thesis, Perry St.. Norton was now the Academy's Chairperson. They decided to use Norton's access to equipment and crew to their advantage. Padovan said: "We've always talked about making a movie based in the West Village in fall ... Because it photographs very well". After toying with a few unfeasible ideas, Norton jokingly said: "We could even make a movie just about a pumpkin ... And we came up with this idea."

=== Writing and casting ===
Norton and Padovan were admirers of Helen Rogers' work in V/H/S; the segment "The Sick Thing" led them to reconceive Jack Attack's lead role. Originally, the central characters were imagined as a mother and son, with the former part to be cast with an age-appropriate genre favorite, as Norton explained:

It was going to be written for someone I grew up with as a horror fan ... Kristy Swanson, Angela Bettis, Catherine Mary Stewart, who's an old friend; we looked at so many people. Then we saw V/H/S and were like, "Let's write it for a babysitter."

=== Filming ===
Jack Attack was filmed on location in the West Village and on a soundstage at Rollin Studios in Brooklyn.

== Release ==
Jack Attack premiered at the Fantasia International Film Festival, where it was paired with The Conjuring on opening night (18 July 2013). It was selected by more than a hundred festivals internationally, including Milan, Sitges, Fantafestival, Melbourne, Fantastic Fest, and the New York City Horror Film Festival. At the Calgary Underground Film Festival, the short was paired with Drew Bolduc's Science Team (2014). In Los Angeles, the film was shown at Mann's Chinese Theatre.

=== Anthology films ===
The short has since achieved a wider release as part of two anthology films in the US: Seven Hells (Gateway Films, Best of Fest, and Hands Off Productions), made up of seven award-winning horror and dark comedy shorts, was released in theaters "just in time for Halloween", in October 2014. All Hallows' Eve 2, nominally a sequel to All Hallows' Eve, is also a standalone film from Ruthless Pictures containing nine story segments. Jack Attack is the first segment.

=== Home media and streaming ===
The film is available in its entirety on Vimeo.

All Hallows' Eve 2 was released in VOD and digital formats on October 6, 2015, and had a DVD release on February 2, 2016. A DVD featuring both All Hallows' Eve and the "sequel" as a "Halloween double feature" was released on September 13, 2016.

== Reception ==
=== Critical response ===
Thomas M. Sipos said Jack Attack is a "one-note film", but it deserved its award at Shriekfest, appreciating "Gordon Yu's beautiful, golden-hued cinematography". Richard Whittaker of the Austin Chronicle called Jack Attack "ghoulishly entertaining", while Jo Satana called it "punchy and strangely whimsical". A Canadian reviewer agreed, noting the "genuinely sweet interactions between Elizabeth and Jack, with both actors giving good, believable performances" which are "almost heartwarming", elements which are daring and "quite effective" in a horror film:

There are times when Jack Attack goes into some pretty gruesome and even frightening places, but it's not done in a mean-spirited fashion. In fact, Jack Attack blends a tasty mix of horror and fun, which is really the perfect recipe for capturing the spirit of Halloween. ... Jack Attack features an impressively high level of production value, which is matched by great sound design and gruesomely satisfying special effects.

A Screen Anarchy reviewer suggested the film was "the perfect morsel to whet the appetite of a festival audience before a feature presentation", saying the directors "employ a slow burn", the small cast forming a "nuanced trio in order to twist the knife a bit further".

=== Selected accolades ===
Jack Attack is said to have won more than thirty awards or honors, including but not limited to the following:

Awards

- Fantasia, 2013 • Audience Award for Best Short (Bronze)
- Shriekfest, 2013 • Best Super Short Film
- Bloody Weekend (Audincourt, 2013) • Best Special Effects
- New Orleans Horror Film Festival (New Orleans, 2013) • Best Short Film
- Terror Film Festival (online) 2013 • Best Horror Short Film

Special mention

- Fantafestival • Honorable mention (Bryan Norton, Antonio Padovan, Joseph Zaso)

Nominations

- Sitges Film Festival, 2013 • Maria Best Short Film
- Milan International Film Festival • Best International Short Film
- Terror Film Festival, 2013 • Best Director of Photography • Best Editing • Best Special Effects

== Related works ==
In 2014, Norton said he was writing a feature-length film that would incorporate Jack Attack as a subplot, "but basically will be Greenwich Village in New York City on one crazy Halloween night."
