= Silvia D'Amico =

Italian actress

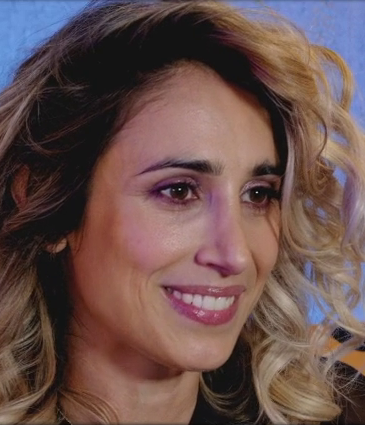
- Silvia D'Amico (Déluge, 2022)
- Born: 4 May 1986 (age 40); Rome, Italy
- Occupation: Actress

Silvia D'Amico (born 4 May 1986) is an Italian television, stage and film actress.

== Life and career ==
Born in Rome, in 2009 D'Amico graduated from the Accademia Nazionale di Arte Drammatica Silvio D'Amico and started her career on stage.

After some minor roles, D'Amico had her breakout in 2014, when she played one of the main characters in the Roan Johnson's ensemble comedy film So Far So Good, which got her a special mention at the 2015 Nastri d'Argento Awards. For her performance in Claudio Caligari's Don't Be Bad, she was awarded the International Starlight Cinema Award as breakthrough actress of the year at the 72nd Venice International Film Festival.

== Filmography ==
- The Red and the Blue (2012)
- Those Happy Years (2013)
- So Far So Good (2014)
- Don't Be Bad (2015)
- Ears (2016)
- The Last Prosecco (2017)
- The Place (2017)
- The Guest (2018)
- The Man Without Gravity (2019)
- I'm Not a Killer (2019)
- Margins (2022)
- Comandante (2023)
- Three Goodbyes (2025)

== Television ==
Title	Year	Role(s)	Network	Notes
Vi perdono ma inginocchiatevi	2012	Rosaria Costa	La7	TV Movie; Supporting role
Questo nostro amore	2013	Adele Bassi	Rai 1	6 episodes; Recurring role
Murders at Barlume	2015	Guest	Sky Italia	Episode: "La tombola dei troiai"
Squadra antimafia	2016	Rosalia Bertinelli	Canale 5	6 episodes; Recurring role
Marta - Il delitto della Sapienza	2021	Lucia	Rai 2	TV Movie; Voice acrtess
A casa tutti bene - La serie	2021–2023	Sara Ristuccia	Sky Italia	Miniseries; Leading role
Christian	2022–present	Rachele	Sky Italia	12 episodes; Leading role
L'Ora - Inchiostro contro piombo	2022	Anna Nicastro	Canale 5	Miniseries; Supporting role
Illuminate: Maria Callas	2023	Herself	Rai 1	Television Special; Voice acrtess
Quei due - Edda e Galeazzo Ciano	2023	Edda Mussolini	Rai 3	TV Movie
Piedone - Uno sbirro a Napoli	2024	Sonia Ascarelli	Sky Italia	Miniseries; Leading role

== Awards and nominations ==
Award	Year	Category	Nominated work	Result	Ref.
Nastro d'Argento	2015	Guglielmo Biraghi Award	So Far So Good	Won	
Nastri d'Argento Grandi Serie	2022	Best Supporting Actress	Christian	Nominated	
La Pellicola d'Oro	2023	Best Actress	Christian	Won	
