= The Mods (film) =

2014 animated short film directed by Antonio Padovan

- Film poster
- Directed by: Antonio Padovan
- Written by: Antonio Padovan
- Produced by: Alessandro Portincasa (uncredited) (Note: Credited as technical director. Portincassa is a studio partner. Sources vary widely as to Portincasa's role or roles on the film, sometimes crediting him as co-director with and even ahead of Padovan.)
- Cinematography: Alessandro Portincasa (uncredited)
- Edited by: Alessandro Portincasa (uncredited)
- Music by: 93 Steps
- Animation by: Alessandra Rosso; Claudia Casapieri
- Color process: Colour
- Production company: AliMik Animation Studio
- Release date: 2014
- Running time: 3 minutes
- Country: Italy

The Mods is a 2014 Italian animated children's short film created by Antonio Padovan and Alessandro Portincasa, about a snake and a dinosaur trying to build a model of a T-Rex. The film's characters are nonverbal and were intended to star in a series of stories. The Mods won an award at the Giffoni Film Festival in 2015.

== Plot ==
Soya the snake is building a "3D puzzle" or model of a T-Rex. The ground shakes as his clumsy friend Michelino, an actual miniature T-Rex, lumbers along and, seeing the blueprints, becomes interested in what Soya is doing and wants to help, to Soya's annoyance. Soya has already had to start over due to the ground shaking from Michelino's heavy steps but then Michelino accidentally knocks the model down a second time.

Frustrated, Soya gives up and swallows the model's pieces rather than rebuild them. Lights similar to X-rays seem to flash as Michelino jumps up and down, such that the jumbled pieces becomes visible inside Soya, changing their configuration with each bound by Michelino. Eventually, they are reassembled as they are supposed to be in Soya's body, which now looks like a T-Rex.

== Production and related works ==
=== Background ===
Raised in Bologna, Alessandro Portincasa obtained a master's degree in computer graphics and moved to Scotland, where he worked in the production of feature films and shorts as a rigger. In 2011 he returned to Italy and became a technical director and partner at the AliMik animation studio. Italian-born writer and director Antonio Padovan moved to New York City, where he eventually received a scholarship to the New York Film Academy and initially made films about common people and their problems. The Mods was his first animated film project and his first film made in Italy. (Note: He directed another animated film in Italy in 2016 (The Little Sunflower that Fell in Love with the Moon) as well as his first feature film, The Last Prosecco, in 2017.)

=== Music ===
The Mods is nonverbal, the characters' utterances amounting to exclamations or grunts, but there is an original score produced by 93 Steps, an audio production company based in Northern Italy near Venice, and Los Angeles, founded by its executive team Francesco Libralon and Lorenzo Scagnolari.

=== Series ===
The Mods was conceived as the first episode of a series of "short stories inspired by the world of toys and fantasy." The Mods page on the AliMik website features a brief animated POV shot of Soya and Michelino setting up a camera to film themselves. As of 2019, a full series has not been realised, but a few other short sequences were made both before and after The Mods.

==== Introducing Michelino ====
A 35-second animation titled Introducing Michelino was uploaded to Behancé in October 2013, in which Michelino's steps shake the 3D logo of AliMik. As Michelino stands up the letter k, the dot on the letter i falls off.

==== Merry Christmas from AliMik and Happy Holidays ====
A six-second Christmas video featuring both characters was uploaded in December 2014. A sixteen-second video of Michelino standing in snow, dressed in winter holiday attire but with exposed, shivering legs, was also uploaded.

== Release and reception ==
The Mods played primarily at Italian film festivals in 2014 and 2015, including Giffoni, the largest children's film festival in the world, where it was part of the "Elements +3" section. and won the Giotto special prize.

The short's first screening outside of Italy but within Europe was at the Annecy Animation Festival. Other festivals where it played in Europe in 2016 included Zlín in May–June and Berwick in September. The short was shown outside of Europe for the first time at the Seattle Children's Film Festival in early 2016. Other American festivals followed, including the BAM Kids Festival on 27 and 28 February, and the REDCAT International Children's Film Festival in April–May 2016.

=== Critical response ===
Official reasons given for the short's award cited its "original" storyboard and animation, "supported by a strong sound design which amazed the audience"; the world of Soya and Michelino is "off-beat" and the characters are "funny and creative".

=== Accolade ===
- Giffoni Film Festival, 2015 • Giotto Super Be-Bè Special Prize
