= All Hallows' Eve 2 =

2015 anthology film

- Release poster
- Directed by: Bryan Norton; Antonio Padovan; Jay Holben; James and Jon Kondelik; Andrés Borghi
- Written by: Jesse Baget; Elias Benavidez; Mark Byers; Andrés Borghi; Jay Holben; Mike Kochansky; James and Jon Kondelik; Michael Koehler; Bryan Norton; Antonio Padovan; Christopher Probst; Marc Roussel; Mark Thibodeau
- Produced by: Damien Leone; Jesse Baget
- Starring: Andrea Monier
- Cinematography: Julián Batistuta; Graham Bremner; Michael Jari Davidson; Andrew Ellis; Aaron Moorhead; Christopher Probst; Kyle Stryker; Gordon Yu
- Edited by: Frank Dale Arroyo; Andrés Borghi; Mike Kochansky; James Kondelik; Mike Maclean; Frank Mohler; John Nicholls; Dan O'Brien
- Music by: Hamdija Ajanovic; Pablo Borghi; Mark Byers; Sam Estes; Christopher Guglick; Michael Mollo; Buck Sanders; Marco Werba
- Production companies: RLJ Entertainment; Hollywood Shorts; Ruthless Pictures
- Distributed by: Image Entertainment
- Release date: October 6, 2015
- Running time: 91 minutes
- Country: United States
- Language: English

All Hallows' Eve 2 is a 2015 American horror anthology film. The film is a standalone sequel to All Hallows' Eve (2013). The film was released on VOD and digital on October 6, 2015, and had a DVD release on February 2, 2016. The film grossed $38,708 in home sales.

It was followed by a 2016 spin-off film titled Terrifier, which spawned the titular franchise that includes two direct sequels in 2022 and 2024.

== Overview ==
A woman, being stalked by a man in a Jack-o'-lantern mask, finds a VHS tape outside her front door. She calls her friend and then begins playing the tape.

=== Jack Attack ===
A babysitter named Elizabeth watches a young boy and his dog, while texting her boyfriend. They carve a pumpkin together and she bakes the seeds, which they all later eat. The kid tries on his scarecrow costume and chokes on a pumpkin seed when he eats it. Elizabeth tries to save him by performing a tracheotomy but finds a mini pumpkin coming out of his throat and later his stomach bursts with lots of mini pumpkins. The babysitter and dog suffer the same fate. Some time later, her boyfriend comes by as pumpkin vines slowly grow in the window.

=== The Last Halloween ===
A husband and wife refuse to greet four trick or treaters, dressed as a witch, devil, ghost, and grim reaper. The wife pleads to let them in but the husband angrily refuses. She disobeys him and lets them in, but they transform into grotesque versions of their costumes. They kidnap the wife and all murmur "It’s too late" to taunt the husband as it cuts to black. The trick or treaters leave the house in costumed form as the house explodes and it is shown to be a hellish apocalypse.

=== The Offering ===
A father and son drive their pickup truck to a deserted area to present an offering of meat to an evil entity. It is revealed the offering is not enough and the father locks the son out of the truck, leaving him to be taken by the entity.

=== Descent ===
A woman visits her friend to find her murdered and the killer still in the house. He stalks her but she escapes. Six weeks later, she is working late and boards an elevator to head home. The same man gets on and begins eyeing and eventually talking to the woman. Rattled, she stabs him to death with a pen. Once the elevator reaches the lobby, she sees the same man yet again, first as a police officer, then as a clerk. She screams as the two men are shown to be different people and the woman hallucinated the visages of the killer and murdered an innocent man.

=== Masochist ===
A carny invites three teenagers to play his spinning wheel game. They agree and are instructed to choose any number of weapons and tools to throw at a man strapped to the wheel to make him bleed. Each takes their turn with a nail covered baseball and butcher knife. The third boy chooses a nail gun, but it is shown his father is the man strapped to the wheel. He pleads for help but the boy lifts his shirt to reveal bruises from his abusive father. He shoots his father with the nail gun and then throws a running chainsaw at his head as he screams and it cuts to black.

=== A Boy's Life ===
A son is grieving the loss of his father and has nightmares about monsters under the bed. His mother helps him defeat the monsters and bonds with her son. As she tucks him into bed, an unseen monster grabs her and drags her screaming under the bed.

=== Mr. Tricker's Treat ===
A disheveled man, Mr. Tricker, has two teenage boys imprisoned. He feeds one lots of candy until he passes out and then drags him to his front porch where he sits him on a bench. He grabs the second teen, carries him out to the front yard and hangs him to death with a sheet over his body. The first teen wakes up and the man goes and slits his throat with a box cutter. Just then a neighborhood woman screams, but in delight at the realistic dead body decorations. The man smiles and knocks her out to add to his other “decorations”.

=== Alexia ===
A teenager is surfing social media, lamenting the death of an ex-girlfriend. He sees a ghoulish apparition in the computer screen which he then unplugs. His current girlfriend comes over to hang out. While he is in the bathroom, she uses his computer to view a video. When he returns, the dead ex has replaced the girlfriend and attacks him.

The woman jumps in fear as the tape ends and she ejects it. Suddenly, the man in the Jack-o'-lantern mask appears behind her and slits her throat.

== Cast ==
- Andrea Monier as Woman
- Damien Monier as Trickster

== Sequel ==
All Hallows' Eve 2 was followed by All Hallows' Eve: Trickster, which was released in 2023, and All Hallows' Eve: Inferno, released in 2024.

== See also ==
- List of films set around Halloween
