= Teatro del Giglio =

Theatre in Lucca, Italy

Coordinates: 43.8406°N 10.5031°E

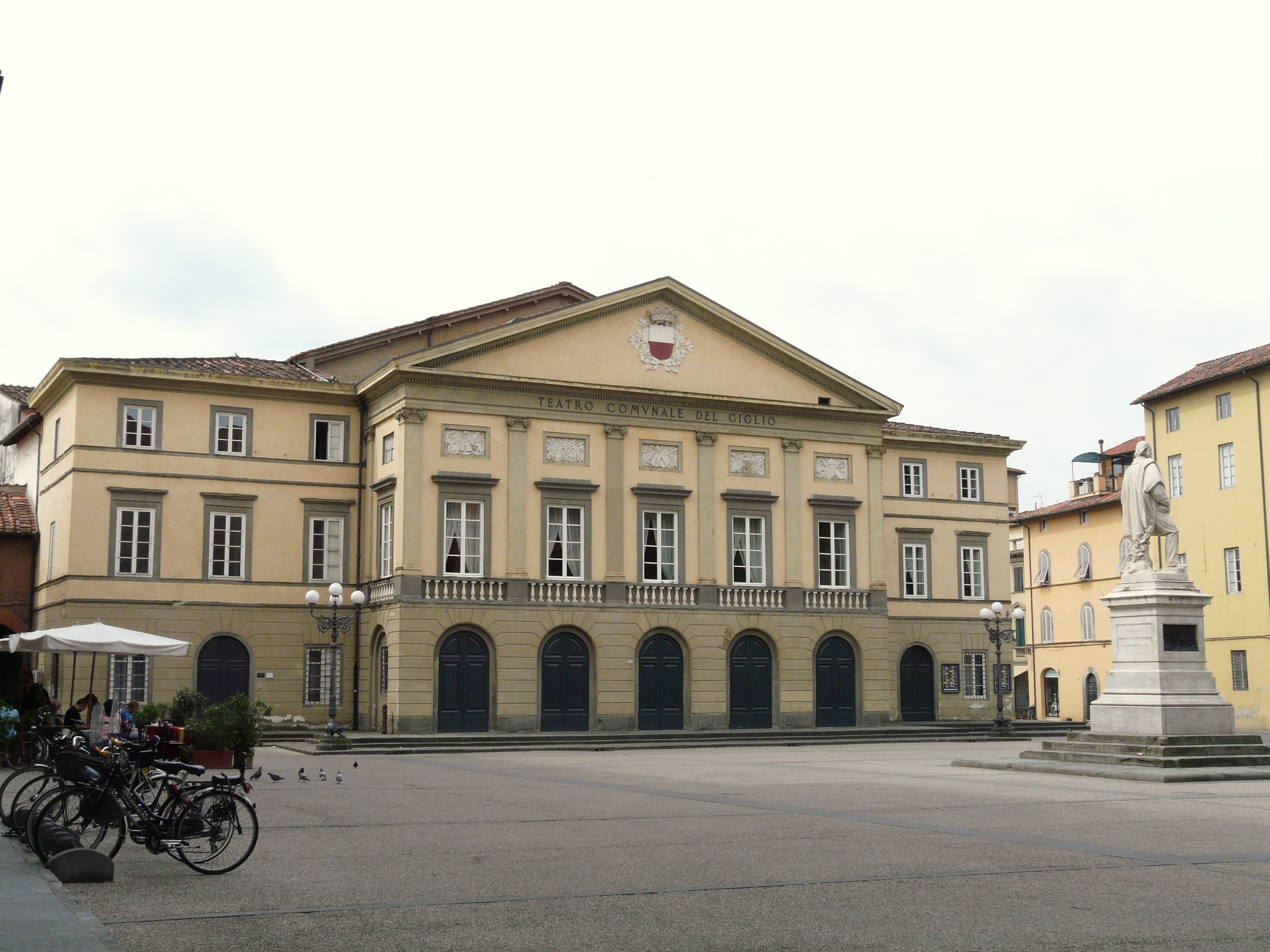
Teatro del Giglio

The Teatro del Giglio (Theater of the Giglio) is the historic city theater and opera house located in Piazza del Giglio #13 and #15 in the center of Lucca, region of Tuscany, Italy. A statue of Garibaldi stands in the square in front of the theater.

== History ==
The prior Teatro Pubblico (Public Theater), inaugurated in 1675, which had been destroyed by a fire and rebuilt. After the Napoleonic upheavals, the site had fallen to ruin. A new theater, represented by this Neoclassical-style structure, was built at the site in 1818 by Giovanni Lazzarini. The rusticated portico is surmounted by a balustrade upholding pilasters, that lead to a tympanum with the coat of arms of the city. The frieze reads Teatro Comunale del Giglio.

The name giglio or lily derives from the fleur-de-lis emblem, that was part of the Bourbon heraldic shield of the reigning duchess, Maria Luisa of the House of Bourbon. In the early 19th century, the interiors were painted by Luigi Catani, while the theater curtain was painted by Federico Tarquini.

On September 17, 1831, the French tenor Gilbert Duprez made operatic history while singing the part of Arnold in Guillaume Tell in the Teatro del Giglio. On that night, he performed a high C (C4) in full chest voice (di petto) rather than the traditional falsettone, a groundbreaking moment in vocal technique. Ever since then, the public has craved high Cs from a tenor.

During the 19th century, the theater underwent updating, adding gas lighting in 1872, and electric lights in 1911. It was closed for two years during World War I. A major refurbishment took place in the 1980s.

== Actors and directors ==
- Nicola Fanucchi actor and director
- Eros Pagni actor
