= Nicola Fanucchi =

Italian stage actor and director (born 1964)

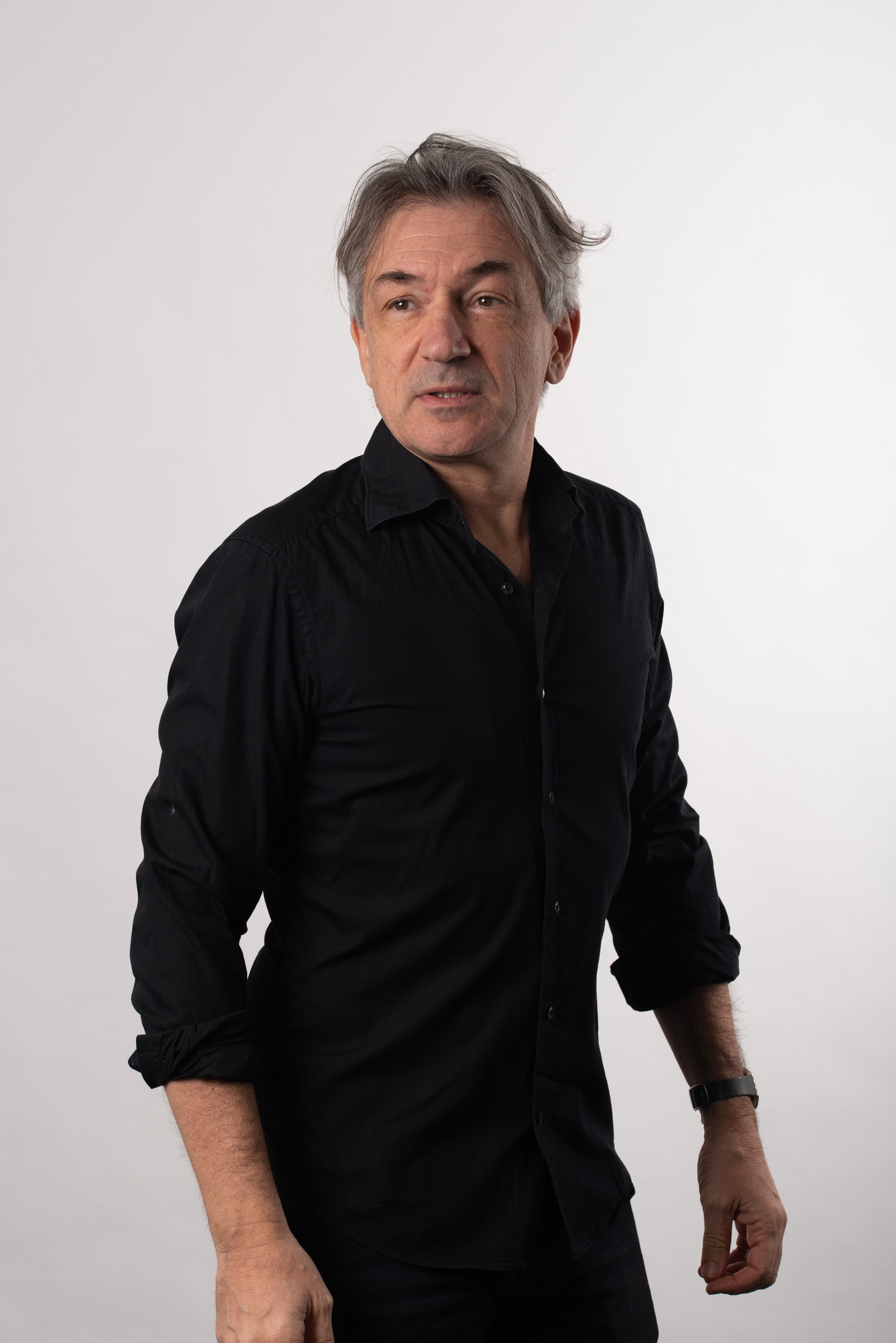
- Fanucchi in 2023
- Born: 29 December 1964 (age 61); Lucca, Italy
- Years active: 1977–present

Nicola Fanucchi (born 29 December 1964) is an Italian stage actor and theatre director.

== Life and career ==
Fanucchi has appeared on stage since he was a child.

In 2000 he made his debut as a professional in productions for the Teatro del Giglio in Lucca, directing "Histoire du Soldat" (Note: "– HISTOIRE DU SOLDAT di Igor Stravinsky, con la partecipazione del gruppo strumentale Agon Ensemble diretto dal M° Stefano Adabbo – regia di Nicola Fanucchi.") and in 2001 he starred in the melodrama "Enoch Arden", (Note: "VOICE AND MUSIC OF THE '900 - Enoch Arden op. 38 by Richard Strauss, melodrama for actors and piano, conductor M ° Stefano Adabbo, with the participation of Eros Pagni in the role of the narrator. Production Teatro Comunale del Giglio - directed by Nicola Fanucchi.") in which he also starred. Since then he has alternated acting and directing in various Italian and foreign theaters, devoting much time to musical theater as well.

In 2011 he began his collaboration with the Peccioli Teatro company directed by Andrea Buscemi, with whom he performed in theatrical tours in co-starring roles. In 2017 he began a collaboration with the Fondazione Sipario Toscana onlus for children.

Since 2017 he has also intensified his activity as an opera director, in Italy and abroad, often in synergy with director Cataldo Russo. His was the first direction of Giacomo Puccini's "Suor Angelica" in the Vicopelago convent where the Lucchese composer's sister was mother superior. In 2018 the two conducted Gaetano Donizetti's "L'elisir d'amore" at the Sejong Art Center in Seoul.

For the Geneva Chamber Opera, in 2019 he co-directed with Cataldo Russo, “Così fan tutte”,. In 2021, again with Cataldo Russo, co-directed “Don Pasquale” by Gaetano Donizetti. and, in 2022, with Gioacchino Rossini's "La cambiale di matrimonio".

In 2023, he signs two productions for the Fondazione Teatro Goldoni in Livorno: “La traviata” by Giuseppe Verdi and “Suor Angelica” by Giacomo Puccini.

In 2024, he played the role of Gianfranco Lenzi, a supporting character in the episode La girata of the eleventh season of the series Murders at BarLume, directed by Milena Cocozza. He began an artistic partnership with Ubaldo Pantani, whick led to him directing two productions: Bartali in 2024 and Inimitabile in 2025. Also in 2025, as an opera director, in addition to various productions in Italy, he directed Pietro Mascagni's Cavalleria Rusticana for the Sibiu Opera Festival in Romania.

== Theater ==
- 2000 “Histoire du soldat” by Charles Ferdinand Ramuz (director and actor), conductor Stefano Addabbo
- 2001 "Enoch Arden" by Alfred Tennysson (director and actor) with Eros Pagni
- 2005 "Platero y yo" by Juan Ramon Jimenez (actor) with Saverio Rapezzi
- 2008 "Pierrot Lunaire" by Arnold Shoenberg (actor), conductor Mario Ancillotti
- 2011 "Veianio" by Giovanni Pascoli (actor), Ensemble Nuovo Contrappunto conductor Mario Ancillotti with Maddalena Crippa
- 2011 "Miriam" from "it:In nome della madre" by Erri De Luca (director)
- 2012 "Ottonovecento strumentale italiano" (actor) with Mario Ancillotti, Simone Soldati, Susanna Rigacci
- 2012 "The merchant of Venice" by William Shakespeare (actor), director Andrea Buscemi
- 2013 "L'avare" by Molière (actor), director Andrea Buscemi
- 2014 "La Mandragola" by Niccolò Machiavelli (actor), director Andrea Buscemi
- 2014 "Il malato immaginario" by Molière (actor) dicrector Andrea Buscemi
- 2016 "Sciailoc" from "The merchant of Venice" by William Shakespeare (director)
- 2017 "Secondo Marco" by Nicola Fanucchi (playwright, director and actor) with Piero Perelli
- 2017 "Abbasso i bulli" by Francesco Tammacco (director)
- 2018 "Linda e un sacco di cose da fare" by Livia Castellana (director)
- 2018 "Mafalda e il suo cagnolino" by Martina Benedetti (director)
- 2018 "Faber per Tenco" by Fabrizio De André and Luigi Tenco (director)
- 2018 "Pasolini lives" by Antonio Pavolini (director and actor)
- 2018 "Processo a Francesco Burlamacchi" by Riccardo Nencini (director)
- 2019 "L'allenatore e la ballerina" by Erno Erbstein and Susanna Egri(playwright and director)
- 2019 "Macerie" by Domenico Sartori (director)
- 2019 "Bauhaus" by Nicola Fanucchi (playwright and director)
- 2021 "La scelta" by Antonio Pavolini (director and actor)
- 2022 "Peer Gynt" by Henrik Ibsen - music by Edvard Grieg. Orchestra Nuove Assonanze directed by Svilen Simeonov (actor)
- 2022 "WAW We are women" by Nicola Fanucchi (playwright and director)
- 2023 "L'avaro" by Molière (actor)
- 2023 "La musica e i luoghi - Lucca Classica Music Festival" (actor)
- 2023 "Preacher and Dreaming Eagles" by Garth Ennis - Festival Lucca Comics & Games 2023 Lucca - (voice actor)
- 2023 "Le stagioni in città. Giuseppe Cederna racconta Marcovaldo" (director)
- 2023 "La fanciulla del west" by David Belasco (director)
- 2024 "Lucca, Vienna, Madrid, in viaggio con Luigi Boccherini" (director and actor)
- 2024 "La donna che svelò Van Gogh" by Federico Giannini (actor)
- 2024 "RSPP" by Morena Rossi (actor)
- 2024 "Bartali" by and with Ubaldo Pantani (director)
- 2024 "An Opportunity" by Andrea Benedetti (actor)
- 2024 "Abbracciatevi moltitudini" by Simone Soldati e Sandro Cappelletto (actor)
- 2025 "Inimitabile" by and with Ubaldo Pantani (director)

== Opera ==
- 2002 "Le nozze di Figaro" by Wolfgang Amadeus Mozart (director), conductor Stefano Adabbo
- 2003 "La serva padrona" by Battista Pergolesi (director), conductor Stefano Adabbo
- 2003 "La voix humaine" by Jean Cocteau (director), conductor Stefano Adabbo
- 2005 "Il segreto di Susanna" by Ermanno Wolf Ferrari (director), conductor Stefano Adabbo
- 2017 "Carmen" by Bizet (assistant director), conductor Mario Menicagli
- 2017 "Turandot" by Giacomo Puccini (assistant director), Beseto Opera Seoul, conductor Franco Trinca with Walter Fraccaro, Irina Vaschenko, Hye-Myung Kang
- 2018 "Suor Angelica" by Giacomo Puccini (director), with Silvana Froli
- 2018 "L'elisir d'amore" by Gaetano Donizetti (co-director), Scm Seoul, conductor Marco Boemi with Bianca Tognocchi
- 2019 "Così fan tutte" by Wolfgang Amadeus Mozart (co-director), Opéra de chambre de Genève, conductor Franco Trinca
- 2020 "De' relitti e delle quarantene" by Mario Menicagli (co-director), conductor Mario Menicagli
- 2021 "Don Pasquale" by Gaetano Donizetti (co-director), Opéra de chambre de Genève conductor Franco Trinca
- 2021 "La serva padrona" by Giovan Battista Pergolesi (director), conductor Stefano Teani
- 2022 "La cambiale di matrimonio" by Gioacchino Rossini (co-director), Opéra de chambre de Genève, conductor Franco Trinca
- 2022 "Tosca, l'ora è fuggita" by Giacomo Puccini (director), Teatro del Giglio di Lucca, Quintetto Lucensis
- 2023 "Madama Butterly" by Giacomo Puccini (co-director), Teatro Luca Ronconi di Gubbio
- 2023 "La Traviata" by Giuseppe Verdi (director), Teatro Goldoni di Livorno
- 2023 "La Traviata immersiva" by Giuseppe Verdi (director)
- 2023 "Suor Angelica" by Giacomo Puccini (director)
- 2023 "From Puccini with love" from Giacomo Puccini (regista)
- 2024 "Scudetto in casa Paisiello" by Oliviero Lacagnina and Mario Menicagli (director)
- 2024 "La Traviata" by Giuseppe Verdi (director)
- 2025 "Don Pasquale" by Gaetano Donizetti (co-director)

== Filmography ==
- Salty Air (2006)
- Puccini (2008)
- Johnny T. (2011)
- Come pesci rossi sul divano (2020)
- Murders at Barlume – Episode "La girata" (2024)

== Awards and acknowledgments ==
- 1993 – Mecenate d’oro, "Best supporting actor award" in "Hello Dolly"
- 1997 – Eurako, "Best actor in leading role award" in "Rumori fuori scena"
- 1998 – Castello di Gorizia, "Best supporting actor award" in "Rumori fuori scena"
- 2001 – Festival nazionale d'Arte Drammatica, "Best actor award" in "La lettera di mamma"
- 2011 – Festival Nazionale Imperia, "Best actor award" in Nove mele per Eva"
