= Antonio Padovan =

Italian film director, producer, and screenwriter

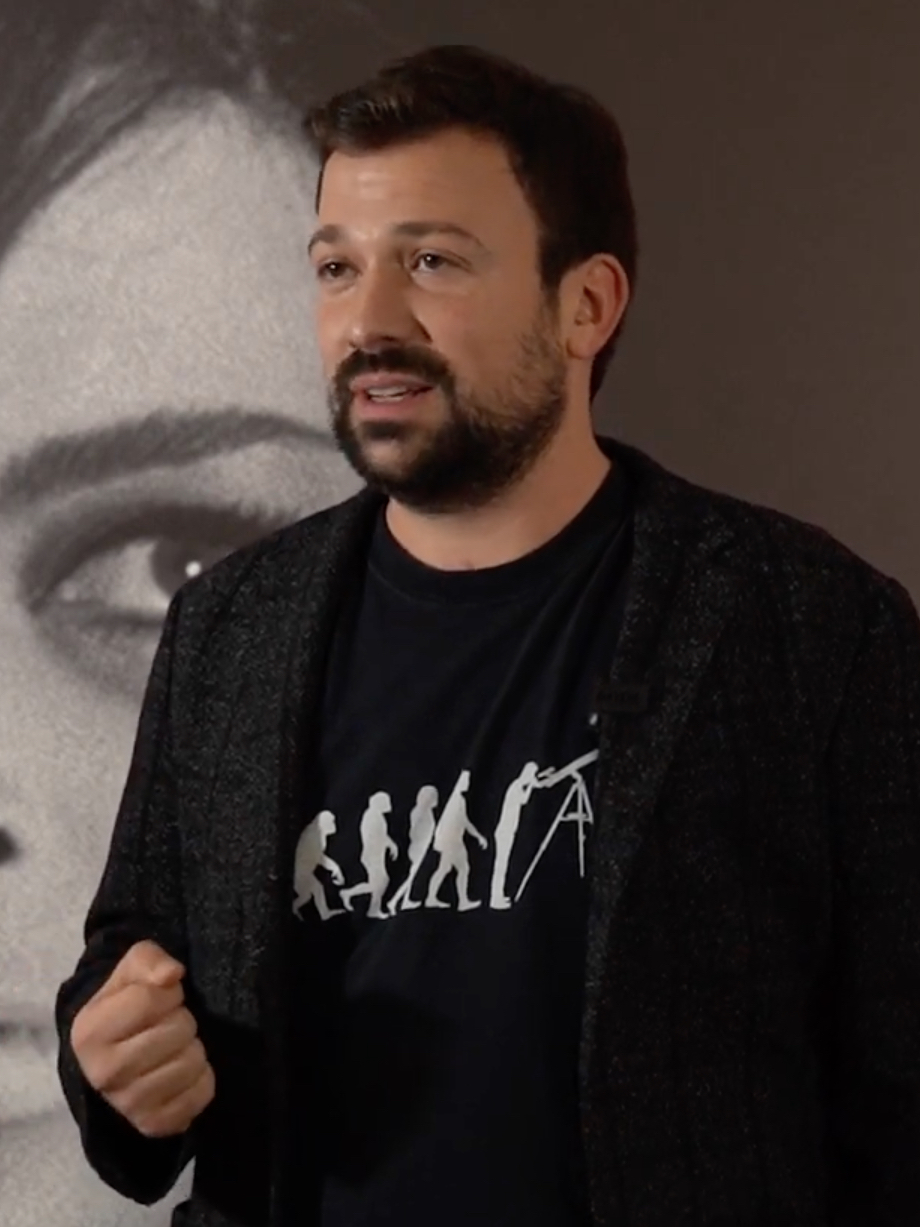
- Padovan in 2019
- Born: 1985 (age 40–41); Conegliano, Veneto, Italy
- Education: New York Film Academy
- Alma mater: Italian School of Design
- Occupations: Film director, film producer, screenwriter, cinematographer, video artist
- Years active: (artistic works): 2010−
- Relatives: Fabio Padovan (father) Mariangela (sister)

Antonio Padovan is an Italian-born film director, producer, screenwriter, and video artist who lives in Treviso, known for his short films Socks and Cakes (2010), Jack Attack (2013), Eveless (2016), his first feature, The Last Prosecco (2017), Il Grande Passo (2019) and Come Fratelli (2025). His video Japan, Beyond (2012) won the first prize at the Stand for Japan Awards, while Jack Attack was selected by more than fifty international film festivals and won dozens of awards and other honors. He was born and raised in the Veneto region, near Venice, but has called New York's West Village home since 2007, and is the co-founder of the Greenwich Village Film Festival.

== Early life and education ==
I think I started to develop an intimate and strong feeling for New York after 9/11 ... I was a teenager and I believe that everything that happens to you when you are between 12 and 18-years-old stays with you forever. After three years of college I couldn't see any other choice other than moving here.

— Antonio Padovan (interview with René S. Garcia Jr.)

Antonio Padovan was born in 1985, in Conegliano, where he also grew up. From a very young age, Padovan had a love for the cinema. He was a teenager on September 11, 2001, which left a very deep impression on him, ultimately precipitating his move to New York City, though he was not conscious of the connection at the time.

Padovan obtained a surveyor's diploma before attending a three-year course at the Italian School of Design in Padua. During the last months of the course he sent his portfolio to a number of studios in Italy and abroad, but responded only to Bam Design, an architectural firm in SoHo, New York, who offered him an internship, requiring him to leave immediately for New York. Padovan moved to New York without any real plan, driven only by a desire to live there, which years later he realized was connected to the impression made on him in his youth.

== Career ==
=== Architect, film studies, and early short films (2007−2011) ===
In 2007, at the age of twenty, Padovan arrived in Manhattan, and the city of New York, which had once been a distant, ill-defined place now became real to him, and his home. The internship led to a paid employment contract: "Originally I wanted to try to work here for a couple of months, but my studio ended up hiring and sponsoring me." Padovan mainly worked on interior design and restorations, in Diesel stores as well as their headquarters on West 19th Street, and Domenico Dolce's penthouse in Chelsea (acquired by the fashion designer in 2009 for $29 million).

After a couple of years, finding himself working twelve-hour days and often weekends, "which is pretty normal for an architect," Padovan realized the career was not for him: "I've always loved films, I own myself probably 2000 DVDs, but back in Italy I never thought I could have been part of it." One night, after seeing a Woody Allen film at the cinema, he was inspired and the next morning enrolled in an eight-week course in film directing at the New York Film Academy instead of going to work. Despite this, the firm continued to give him projects, and he began to divide his time between architecture and wandering Manhattan with a camera on his shoulder; at the end of the program, after completing his first short film, he received a full scholarship to come back for another year. Padovan's first short film, which he wrote as well as directed, was Socks and Cakes, a slice of life film that impressed not only his professors, but also the judges at the 2010 Las Vegas film festival, where it won a Golden Ace Award. His next short film was his student thesis, Perry St., a romantic comedy about a therapist and patient who struggle with the issues within their separate love lives, starring Catherine Mary Stewart. Also released in 2010, it was accepted at sixteen film festivals and well received, winning four awards and an honorable mention. Not long after, he made another short film shot in Taiwan, Tomorrow.

By July 2011, Padovan released his fourth film, Mia, "a romantic comedy" set in the West Village (a "favorite locale"), and which played at major film festivals, and was halfway through shooting his fifth film, Tillman, a project where for the first time he was his own cinematographer. He was now involved in several other projects simultaneously and in diverse capacities, here a production assistant (AmeriQua), there co-writing a horror short, writing a feature film, as well as a project based in China. His Christmas film, Puh-Rump-A-Pum-Pum was also released in 2011. It has been remarked that most of these early films focus "on common people and ordinary problems."

=== Video and commercial film director (2011−2013) ===
Along with his early artistic achievements, Padovan's professional directing career began in earnest with a company called JAJ, directing videos and commercials, his time divided between the US, Europe and Asia, working for companies from all around the world, including eStock Photo, Barilla and Hyundai. Some of his commercials ran during the 2012 FIFA World Cup. He was commissioned by Asatsu-DK, the largest communication company in Japan, to direct a video intended to restore Japan's international image in the wake of the Fukushima disaster; the result was Japan, Beyond (2012), for which Padovan won the Stand for Japan Award and was invited to Tokyo.

In May 2012, it was reported that Padovan had co-written a feature film, Getting Closer, with producer and playwright Libby Edmonds about two women in their forties, and the love relationship that develops between one of the women and her friend's 18-year-old son, an exploration of "a sincere, love relationship of an older woman and a younger man," and its effect upon the two best friends which interested Padovan because Hollywood routinely presents older men with younger female love interests and very rarely the other way round. As of 2019, this project has not been realised and appears to have been abandoned.

=== Genre and documentary filmmaker (2013−2016) ===
In 2013, Padovan began to release films reflecting his exploration of other genres of filmmaking: he wrote and directed an hour-long documentary film, Once Upon a Time, Inc., about the eponymous non-profit performing arts center and theater in Richmond Hill, Queens, where Padovan taught a class in filmmaking once per week, and a breakthrough in the form of his first short horror movie, Jack Attack, which won more than thirty awards, and was selected by more than fifty festivals internationally, including Fantafestival, Milan, Sitges, Fantasia, Melbourne, Fantastic Fest, and the New York City Horror Film Festival. In Los Angeles, the film was shown at the Mann's Chinese Theatre, and has since been released as part of two anthology films in the U.S.: Seven Hells (2014), and All Hallows' Eve 2 (2015).

Padovan's next short films, released from 2014 through 2016, were M is for Misdirection, selected as one of the twelve finalists for the ABCs of Death 2 competition, from 548 international entries, and a pair of short animated films produced in Italy: The Mods, which won the Giotto Special Prize at the Giffoni Film Festival, the largest children's film festival in the world, and The Little Sunflower that Fell in Love with the Moon, which he later adapted as a children's book published by Le Brumaie (2017) and launched at the International Book Fair in Turin, in 2017. Eveless (2016) is a science-fiction horror film about two men living in a world without women who attempt to create one with only the limited resources they have gathered. It was selected for inclusion in the 2017 Canadian science-fiction horror anthology film Galaxy of Horrors, which comprises eight short films within a larger narrative frame in which a man awakens from a cryogenic sleep pod and is forced to watch the shorts as entertainment while his damaged life-support runs out.

==== Greenwich Village Film Festival ====
During this period, in 2015, Padovan co-founded the Greenwich Village Film Festival, which selects short films and documentaries from around the world, with fellow filmmaker Alessia Gatti, with a view to celebrating the neighborhood where they both live, and where most of Padovan's films have been made (specifically, in the West Village). Alessia Gatti describes the origins and quick expansion of the event in 2016:

It started out as just an idea I had with a friend, Antonio Padovan, and then luck had it our way when on the night of our first edition we met two producers, Richard Eric Weigle and Michael Anastasio, both of which have been residents of the village for forty-three years. They were enthused with our idea and decided to join us for this year's event. Thanks to their support we're now able to hold the event for three nights at our 2016 edition.

The festival has continued to grow, and in 2018, was held in the IFC Center.

=== Feature film director (2017− ) ===
==== Debut feature ====
In 2016, Padovan was reportedly in post-production for his first feature film, set to be released in the fall of 2017, a murder mystery comedy film taking place among the vineyards of Prosecco, in the hills outside Venice. Based on the 2010 novel Finché c'è Prosecco c'è Speranza by Fulvio Ervas, it would promote the image of the Veneto region. In a 2018 interview, when asked why he returned to Italy to make his first feature, Padovan said that while on a ten-day vacation in Italy, his sister suggested he read a novel set in his (and the author's) native Veneto region; it impressed him for its story, but it was also out of nostalgia that he decided that his first feature film should be shot "in his own house" (l'avrei girato "a casa mia"), the Veneto region having been relatively unexplored by Italian cinema up to now. Padovan collaborated with Ervas to write the screenplay for The Last Prosecco, which stars Giuseppe Battiston.

==== Second feature ====
In the 2018 interview, Padovan said he was working on a second Italian feature based on an original idea co-written with Marco Pettenello, scheduled for release in 2019. A casting call was issued in the Polesine area by Padovan in March 2019. The title was revealed to be Il grande passo during the casting call in Rovigo. In April, a second casting call was made for the project, with filming to take place in Rosolina. Cast members included Giuseppe Battiston, Stefano Fresi, and Camilla Filippi, while crew included Gaspare De Pascali (screenplay) and Duccio Cimatti (cinematography). Additional filming locations included Canaro, Crespino, and Villanova Marchesana, with shooting beginning on 9 April and was to have concluded on 18 May, with Battiston and Fresi, who had never appeared on screen together before, playing two brothers, Mario and Dario. As it transpired, the plot involves igniting a rocket ship, but something went wrong on 1 May and the prop was completely destroyed, thereby postponing the shoot. Despite the delay, the film was released as scheduled, winning awards for the two leads at the 37th Turin Film Festival in late November 2019.

Third feature

On June 26, 2025, the third film directed by Padovan was released in theaters. Come Fratelli (Like Brothers) sees the participation of some important Italian actors, among which stand out: Pierpaolo Spollon, Francesco Centorame e Ludovica Martino. The film is particularly striking for the places in which it is set, which are particularly dear to the director as they are his places of residence. Glimpses of Treviso and particular glimpses of the plaster cast museum of Possagno.

The story tells of two friends, united by the joy of pregnancy, who die in a car accident. Their husbands, now widowers and single fathers, decide to overcome the pain together becoming a sort of "brothers" to help each other in raising their children.

== Aesthetics and directing style ==
Antonio Padovan does not like what he calls a "self-absorbed directorial style, where the use of albeit visually striking images" clouds the story, citing as examples Terrence Malick's The Tree of Life, and films by Tim Burton and the Coen Brothers. In his opinion, Bridesmaids is a better film than Tree of Life and Toy Story 3 "a far better film and a worthier recipient of the Oscar for Best Picture" than The King's Speech.

Padovan once described himself as "a very cynical filmmaker": "I like to work on projects that can happen soon and can be done soon. I can't write something that I intend to shoot in a year or two, because that idea scares me. I write knowing how to shoot and when, so that everything runs easier." He engages in intense pre-production work and does not believe in over-directing actors: "Cast good actors and get out of their way," unless the actor gets nervous as the shooting day approaches, "then it becomes necessary to feed them little lies just to bolster their self-confidence."

== Filmography ==
Short films and notable videos (2010−2016)

- Socks and Cakes (2010)
- Perry St. (2010)
- Tomorrow (2010?)
- Mia (2011)
- Tillman (2011)
- Puh-Rump-A-Pum-Pum (2011)
- Japan, Beyond (2012)
- Once Upon a Time, Inc. (2013) • documentary
- Jack Attack (2013)
- M is for Misdirection (2014)
- The Mods (2014) • 3D CG animation
- The Little Sunflower that Fell in Love with the Moon (2016) • 3D CG animation
- Eveless (2016)

Feature films (2017− )

- The Last Prosecco (2017)
- Il Grande Passo (2019)
- Come Fratelli (2025)
