= The First on the List =

- Film poster
- Italian: I primi della lista
- Directed by: Roan Johnson
- Written by: Roan Johnson; Davide Lantieri; Renzo Lulli
- Starring: Claudio Santamaria; Francesco Turbanti; Paolo Cioni
- Cinematography: Tommaso Borgstrom
- Edited by: Marco Guelfi
- Music by: Carratello; Rachtev
- Release date: November 11, 2011
- Running time: 85 minutes
- Country: Italy
- Language: Italian

The First on the List (Italian: I primi della lista) is a 2011 Italian comedy film directed by Roan Johnson.

The film is based on a real event involving the anarchist singer-songwriter Pino Masi and his friends Renzo Lulli and Fabio Gismondi in 1970.

== Plot ==
1 June 1970, Pisa. The singer and far-left activist Pino Masi believes a military coup with neo-fascist roots is imminent, similar to what had happened in Greece, based on a "tip-off" he received from Rome. Fearing he might be listed as a primary enemy of the new regime and on an elimination list ("the first on list"), he decides to flee abroad with two of his young companions, Renzo Lulli and Fabio Gismondi.

After several misunderstandings, the escape ends at the Austrian border, where the three, arrested for attempting to break through customs, apply for political asylum but discover that the coup never occurred. They had confused military movements related to the 2 June celebration with those of the coup. Everything seems resolved except that, due to their escapade, a Carabinieri officer was injured and weapons and drugs were found in the car.

Later, there was indeed an attempt at a coup on 7 December 1970, but it did not have any concrete effects on the institutions of the Italian Republic.

== Cast ==
- Claudio Santamaria as Pino Masi
- Francesco Turbanti as Renzo Lulli
- Paolo Cioni as Fabio Gismondi
- Sergio Pierattini as Renzo's father
- Daniela Morozzi as Renzo's mother
- Fabrizio Brandi as Fabio's father
- Anna Maria Seravesi as Fabio's mother
- Guglielmo Favilla as a student
- Silvio Vannucci as Aldo Moro
