= The Little Sunflower that Fell in Love with the Moon =

2016 short computer graphics animated film directed by Antonio Padovan

- Film poster
- Il piccolo Girasole che s'innamorò della Luna
- Directed by: Antonio Padovan
- Written by: Antonio Padovan
- Story by: Antonio Padovan
- Produced by: Marco Savini (executive producer); Tommaso Battaglini; Alice Berti; Giovanni Bianchet; Niccolò Danieletto; Camilla Galbiati; Thomas Iluliano; Barbara Palmitesta; Rita Spinazzè; Alessandro Testa; Giulia Vetrano; Giacomo Lucchini; Alejandro Castedo
- Cinematography: Antonio Padovan (uncredited)
- Edited by: Antonio Padovan (uncredited)
- Music by: Filippo Zattini
- Animation by: Alessandro Abbruzzese; Fracesca Amoroso; Matilde Angelini; Riccardo Canton; Davide Covalero; Elena Felici; Lorenzo Ferraroni; Isabelli Foffi; Isabel Christina Hor; Nunzia Lombardo; Albero Lunardi; Elena Nardi; Marco Zancopè
- Color process: Colour
- Production companies: BigRock; See-D; Stormborn Studio
- Release date: July 2016 (LFF)
- Running time: 6 minutes
- Country: Italy

The Little Sunflower that Fell in Love with the Moon (Italian: Il piccolo Girasole che s'innamorò della Luna) is a 2016 Italian short 3D CG animated film written and directed by Antonio Padovan, produced by the BigRock school of animation as a final thesis for eighty students. The short, which contains no dialogue, is Padovan's second animated film following The Mods. In 2017, he published a children's book adaptation of the story in Italian.

== Plot ==
In an Italian city, there is a sunflower in a pot on a window sill in a boy's room containing a globe, maps, and an orrery (shown in close up at the start). The Sunflower's strength waxes and wanes with the light of the Sun. One night, as the Moon shines brightly on the Sunflower, which is drooping, and so takes no notice, one of its petals happens to fall. In the morning, the Boy takes a watering can and pours a measure of water such that a small pool forms in the pot.

That night, because of the pool of water, the Sunflower sees the Moon's reflection for the first time and stirs, as though surprised by the beauty of the celestial body. Realising from the experience that the Moon can only be seen by means of reflected water, the Sunflower contrives to pull out another of its petals, so that the Boy will water it once more. The Sunflower continues on like this till at last there is only one petal left.

Unexpectedly, in the middle of the day, as the Sun shines the Moon crosses its path and briefly takes its place in the clear blue sky. As the Boy is peering through his telescope at the eclipse, the Sunflower, able to see the Moon itself and not a reflection of it for the first time, turns its two leaves inward, forming the shape of a heart as revealed by the shadow it casts, in a declaration of love.

As the credits begin to roll, photographs of the Boy begin to appear showing him growing to manhood. The Sunflower, too, grows new petals, and witnesses more eclipses of the Sun, and so more sights of its beloved Moon, as the years go by.

== Themes ==
Silvia Vacirca remarks that the Sunflower appears to "fall in love" not with the Moon, but its reflection (since it is impossible for it to "look up" at the Moon at night). Antonio Padovan and some other production sources usually frame the story in terms of unobtainable, impossible love, or even forbidden love. It turns out, however, that it is not impossible: the Sunflower does at last see the Moon: fairy tales teach us that "nothing is impossible."

== Production ==
=== Background ===
In 2005, executive producer Marco Savini founded the BigRock School Institute of Magic Technologies, the first training centre in visual effects in Italy, housed in a renovated farmhouse in Ca 'Tron, in the Roncade countryside of the Veneto region, where filmmaker Antonio Padovan grew up before moving to New York City where he is based. In 2014, Padovan directed his first short animated film in Italy, The Mods, which won the Giotto Special Prize at the Giffoni Film Festival, the largest children's film festival in the world.

=== Filming ===
The Little Sunflower that Fell in Love with the Moon was produced as one of two final thesis projects in the master's in computer graphics of eighty students who worked on it over a period of six weeks out of their intensive six-month course. Padovan "took care of the first steps of the project" and personally "set the cameras directly in the 3D scene," using HTC Vive technology courtesy of Stormborn Studio (known primarily for their virtual reality games) and the Master VR I group. Padovan has uploaded a short video on Vimeo in which he takes the viewer on a tour of BigRock's facilities and demonstrates the use of the technology, while another video shows what it looks like exclusively from the point of view of the director.

Many of the eighty students had more than one task to perform for the film, and some, like Chiara Piseddu, were involved at several stages:

[D]uring the first weeks of the thesis I was in the 3D Modelling group... When the 3D models were almost ready... I moved into the Layout department, where we basically set up the... set... and optimized it, so that we could have a light and speed scene for the renders. Once the 3D models in the scene were ready and lighters and shaders were working on it, I moved again to the Rendering department. We worked on the render tests to set up the render settings and then we sent the renders of the entire movie during the nights and weekends, so we could use all 80 computers as a render farm. I also had some time to help... with some ideas and animations that they used in the Making Of movie.

The "making of" movie, which shows the steps as outlined above, has been posted to Vimeo.

=== Music ===
While there is no dialogue in the short, the film features an original score composed by Filippo Zattini and performed in collaboration with the Ariggo Pedrollo Conservatory of Music.

== Release and reception ==
An advance private screening of the thesis film for the BigRock students and their families on their graduation day was arranged at The Space Cinema in Silea, the occasion marked with a red carpet, photocall and a golden statuette for award winners called "BigOscar", in a parodic reference to Hollywood's Oscars, on 26 February 2016.

The world premiere of The Little Sunflower that Fell in Love with the Moon took place in July at the 12th Lago Film Festival (International Festival of Short Films, Documentaries, and Screenplays), in the UNICEF section.

=== Critical response ===
Silvia Vacirca speaks admiringly of the discipline and determination required for the animation of a single petal, and goes on to remark that this is a film full of petals; she finds the animators' tenacity "frightening".

=== Online platform ===
The short film is available in its entirety on Vimeo.

== Related works ==
=== Conference presentation ===
Padovan, Savini and Michael John Gorman (CEO, Science Gallery Dublin) made a joint presentation in Venice on 10 December 2015 on the subject of science and technology in the arts and creativity (Scienza e tecnologia tra arte e creatività).

=== Children's book ===
Padovan adapted his story as a children's book with illustrations by Marina Carosi, who is from Padovan's home town of Conegliano, published by Le Brumaie 30 April 2017. It was launched at the International Book Fair in Turin.

== See also ==
- Endymion (mythology)
