= The Second Wife (1998 film) =

1998 comedy film

- Directed by: Ugo Chiti
- Screenplay by: Ugo Chiti; Nicola Zavagli
- Produced by: Rita Rusić; Vittorio Cecchi Gori
- Starring: Maria Grazia Cucinotta; Lazar Ristovski
- Cinematography: Raffaele Mertes
- Edited by: Roberto Perpignani
- Music by: Pivio and Aldo De Scalzi
- Release date: 1998
- Language: Italian

The Second Wife (Italian: La seconda moglie) is a 1998 Italian coming-of-age comedy-drama film co-written and directed by Ugo Chiti and starring Maria Grazia Cucinotta. It premiered at the 55th Venice International Film Festival.

== Plot ==
Anna, a Sicilian single mother marries an older, crass widowed truck driver named Fosco in the early 1960s. When Fosco is arrested for smuggling an antique, Anna develops an emotional and romantic attachment to his handsome teenage stepson, Livio.

== Cast ==
- Maria Grazia Cucinotta as Anna
- Lazar Ristovski as Fosco
- Giorgio Noè as Livio
- Candida Vettori as Stella
- Jessica Auriemma as Santina
- Sergio Pierattini as Uncle Moreno
- Stefano Abbati as Uncle Umberto
- Patrizia Corti as Fernanda
- Pietro Fornaciari as Sirio
- Dante Daddi as Omero

== Production ==
The film was shot in Tuscany, with principal photography starting in August 2017.

== Release ==
The film had its world premiere at the 55th edition of the Venice Film Festival, in the Prospectives sidebar.

== Reception ==
Variety's critic David Rooney described the film as a "technically polished" film with a "cliched story" that looks like "a comparatively chaste version of the rustic sexfests made by Tinto Brass in the 1980s". Svet Atanasov from DVD Talk favorably compared the film to Giuseppe Tornatore's Malèna and called it "a pleasant surprise" and "a very enjoyable film, one that relies on a well structured plot bringing quite a twist to the finale". Paolo Mereghetti panned the film, describing it as "a festival of banalities" that "looks like a Mulino Bianco commercial".
