= Piuma (film) =

2016 Italian film by Roan Johnson

- Film poster
- Directed by: Roan Johnson
- Written by: Roan Johnson
- Starring: Blu Yoshimi
- Cinematography: Davide Manca
- Music by: Lorenzo Tomio
- Release dates: 5 September 2016 (Venice); 20 October 2016 (Italy)
- Running time: 98 minutes
- Country: Italy
- Language: Italian

Piuma is a 2016 Italian drama film directed by Roan Johnson. It was selected to compete for the Golden Lion at the 73rd Venice International Film Festival.

== Plot ==
Cate and Ferro, born and raised in Rome, are a couple, both eighteen, struggling with their high school final exams, the two will also have to deal with an unexpected pregnancy. Those nine months will lead them to review everything they thought they knew about the world, creating confusion even in their respective families, apparently stable for him, and penniless for her, in the end, the priorities of life, which until then seemed untouchable, will be completely overturned, and will allow the two young people to finally let their love mature and make it a little more responsible.

== Cast ==
- Blu Yoshimi as Cate
- Michela Cescon as Carla Pardini
- Sergio Pierattini as Franco Pardini
- Francesco Colella as Alfredo
- Luigi Fedele as Ferro
- Brando Pacitto as Brando
