= Scuola Italiana Design =

Educational institution in Italy

- Motto: La Scuola delle Idee
- Motto in English: The School of Ideas
- Type: higher-education institute of design
- Established: 1991
- Affiliations: Science and Technology Park "Galileo"
- President: Francesca Gambarotto
- Students: 162
- Location: Padua, Italy
- Nickname: SID
- Website: https://www.scuolaitalianadesign.com/

Scuola Italiana Design (Italian School of Design, SID) was the first higher education Institute established in the Northeast of Italy.

== History ==
Scuola Italiana Design was established in 1991 in Padua. Since 2001 it has been the educational department of the Scientific and Technological Park "Galileo".

== Education ==
Its educational program consists mainly of a three-year Study Plan in Creative Design, a one-year Master in Creative Design, a series of seminars, workshops and brief courses.

The Institute created a workshop in which participants develop concept designs on the Croatian seaside, named "SID Summer Workshop".

Educational collaborations are underway with other European institutes, such as Vilnius Academy of Fine Arts (Lithuania), Kielce Technology Park (Poland) and MSTUM (Russia).

== Memberships ==
Scuola Italiana Design is a member of ADI (Associazione per il Disegno Industriale) and translated into 'Italian the Code of Ethics of designers for ICSID' (International Council of Societies of Industrial Design).
