= So Far So Good (film) =

- Film poster
- Italian: Fino a qui tutto bene
- Directed by: Roan Johnson
- Written by: Roan Johnson; Ottavia Mededdu
- Starring: Alessio Vassallo; Paolo Cioni; Silvia D'Amico; Guglielmo Favilla; Melissa Bartolini
- Cinematography: Davide Manca
- Music by: Gatti Mezzi; Zen Circus
- Release date: October 22, 2014 (Rome Film Festival)
- Running time: 80 minutes
- Country: Italy
- Language: Italian

So Far So Good (Italian: Fino a qui tutto bene) is a 2014 Italian comedy film directed by Roan Johnson.

The film premiered at the 2014 Rome Film Festival and won the audience award.

== Cast ==
- Alessio Vassallo as Vincenzo
- Paolo Cioni as Cioni
- Silvia D'Amico as Ilaria
- Guglielmo Favilla as Andrea
- Melissa Bartolini as Francesca
- Isabella Ragonese as Marta
- Marco Teti as Bernardini
- Milvia Marigliano as Ilaria's mother
- Mario Balsamo as Ilaria's father
- Paolo Giommarelli as the professor
