= Marco Malvaldi =

Italian chemist, crime writer, and popular science author (born 1974)

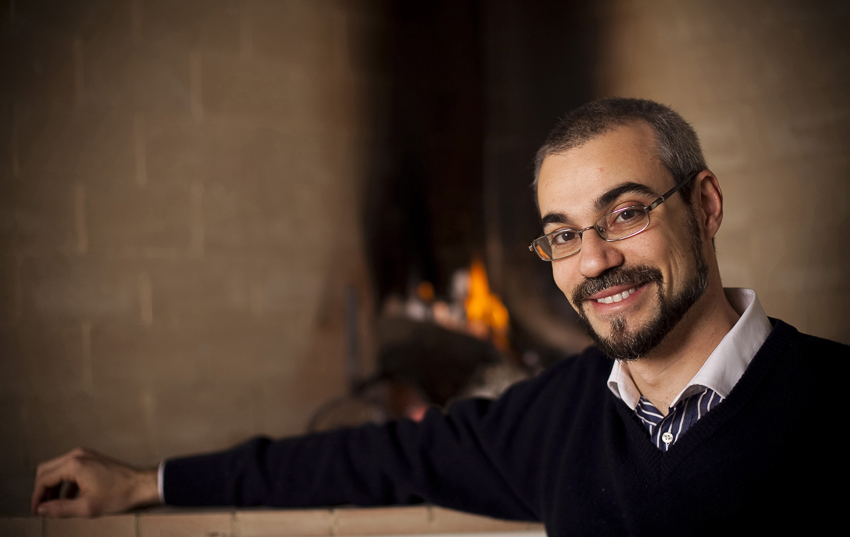
- Marco Malvaldi in 2012
- Born: 27 January 1974 (age 52); Pisa, Italy
- Occupations: Crime novelist, chemist, popular science writer
- Known for: BarLume crime series set in Tuscany

Marco Malvaldi (born 27 January 1974, in Pisa) is an Italian crime writer.

== Short biography ==
Marco Malvaldi is an Italian chemist and novelist, who began his writing career in 2007 with his first mystery story La briscola in cinque (Game for Five, 2014), published by the Italian Sellerio Editore and featuring Massimo, the barista and owner of the cleverly named BarLume ("Bar Light", also a wordplay for "flicker, glimmer of light") who is forced into the role of investigator in the fictional seaside resort town of Pineta, along the Tuscan coast. He followed up by other episodes in the series: Il gioco delle tre carte (2008, transl. Three-card Monte, 2014), Il re dei giochi (The King of Games) (2010), La carta più alta (The Highest Card) (2012). Another novel of his, Odore di chiuso (The Scent of Must) (Sellerio, October 2011), a historical mystery with the renowned Romagna gastronomist Pellegrino Artusi as the amateur detective in 19th century Italy, was awarded the Isola d’Elba Award and the Castiglioncello Prize. This book was published in English under the title The Art of Killing Well (2014). In October 2011, Malvaldi also published a guidebook about his own hometown Pisa, with the title Scacco alla Torre (Checkmate to the Tower) (Felici Editore): one of the book's first stories is Finalmente soli (Finally Alone), narrating of a nocturnal walk, inspired by an image taken by professional photographer Nicola Ughi, Malvaldi's official portraitist and fellow citizen; the book was presented at the Pisa Book Festival.

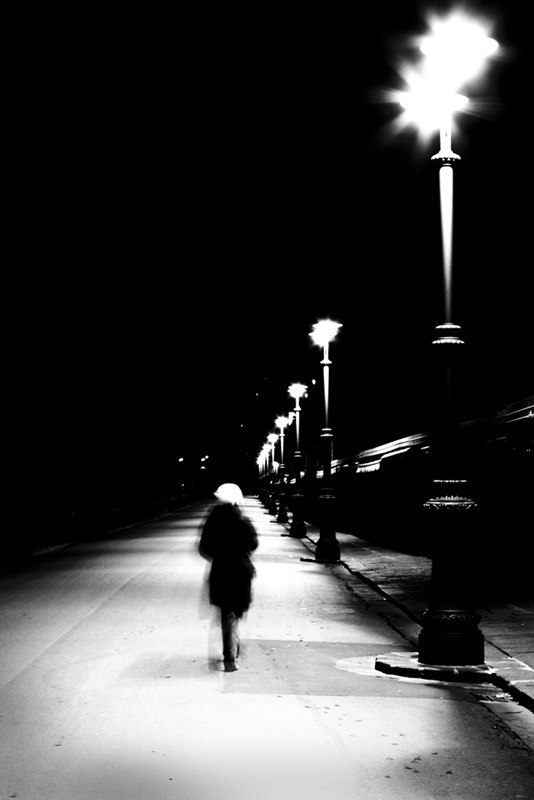
The image of Pisa by night, which inspired the story Finalmente soli.

The four books composing the BarLume series have the same characters in each episode: the barista Massimo, the four aged regular patrons (Massimo's grandfather Ampelio, Aldo, Rimediotti, and Del Tacca – often speaking in the local Tuscan dialect), obtuse Inspector Fusco, and sexy bar assistant Tiziana. At end of October 2012, Malvaldi published a mystery thriller, Milioni di milioni (Millions of Millions) (2012), set in the fictional Tuscan town of Montesodi Marittimo, and with its main personages an odd couple of investigators – a university geneticist and a female archivist.

In July 2013 he was awarded the Italian literary prize "Premio letterario La Tore Isola d'Elba".

Malvaldi has also authored books of popular science. His book Le due teste del tiranno. Metodi matematici per la libertà (namely, The Two Heads of the Tyrant. Mathematical Methods for the Freedom) (2017) won the third edition (2018) of Premio Asimov.

He is married to Samantha Bruzzone, with whom he wrote some children's stories and two novels with her: Chi si ferma è perduto (2022) e La regina dei sentieri (2024).

== Bibliography ==
(It. orig. only)

=== BarLume series ===
- La briscola in cinque, Sellerio Editore, Palermo, 2007
- Il gioco delle tre carte, Sellerio Editore, Palermo, 2008
- Il re dei giochi, Sellerio Editore, Palermo, 2010
- La carta più alta, Sellerio Editore, Palermo, 2012
- Il telefono senza fili, Sellerio Editore, Palermo, 2014
- La battaglia navale, Sellerio Editore, Palermo, 2016
- A bocce ferme, Sellerio Editore, Palermo, 2018
- Bolle di sapone, Sellerio Editore, Palermo, 2021
- La morra cinese, Sellerio Editore, Palermo, 2023
- Piomba libera tutti, Sellerio Editore, Palermo, 2025

==== Compilation books ====
- Trilogia del BarLume, Sellerio Editore, Palermo, 2011
- Sei casi al BarLume, Sellerio Editore, Palermo, 2016
- I delitti del BarLume volume II, Sellerio Editore, Palermo, 2019
- L’uomo vestito di arancione. Sei casi al BarLume, Sellerio Editore, Palermo, 2026

==== Short stories ====
- L'esperienza fa la differenza, in Un Natale in giallo, Sellerio Editore, Palermo, 2011
- Il Capodanno del Cinghiale, in Capodanno in giallo, Sellerio Editore, Palermo, 2012
- Azione e reazione, in Ferragosto in giallo, Sellerio Editore, Palermo, 2013
- La tombola dei troiai, in Regalo di Natale, Sellerio Editore, Palermo, 2013
- Costumi di tutto il mondo, in Carnevale in giallo, Sellerio Editore, Palermo, 2014
- Aria di montagna, in Vacanze in giallo, Sellerio Editore, Palermo, 2014
- Non si butta via nulla, in La crisi in giallo, Sellerio Editore, Palermo, 2015
- Fase di transizione, in Turisti in giallo, Sellerio Editore, Palermo, 2015
- Donne con le palle, in Il calcio in giallo, Sellerio Editore, Palermo, 2016
- In crociera col Cinghiale, in Viaggiare in giallo, Sellerio Editore, Palermo, 2017
- Voi, quella notte, voi c'eravate, in Un anno in giallo, Sellerio Editore, Palermo, 2017
- L'uomo vestito di arancione, in Una giornata in giallo, Sellerio Editore, Palermo, 2018
- Qualcuno alla finestra, in Cinquanta in blu. Otto racconti gialli, Sellerio Editore, Palermo, 2019
- Giovedì gnocchi, in Una settimana in giallo, Sellerio Editore, Palermo, 2021
- Un regalo che solo io posso farti, in Una notte in giallo, Sellerio Editore, Palermo, 2022
- Concorrenza sleale, in Cucina in giallo, Sellerio Editore, Palermo, 2023
- Di canti di gioia, di canti d'amore, in Dodici mesi in giallo, Sellerio Editore, Palermo, 2025

=== Other novels ===
- Odore di chiuso, Sellerio Editore, Palermo, 2011
- Milioni di milioni, Sellerio Editore, Palermo, 2012
- Argento vivo, Sellerio Editore, Palermo, 2013
- Buchi nella sabbia, Sellerio Editore, Palermo, 2015
- Negli occhi di chi guarda, Sellerio Editore, Palermo, 2017
- La misura dell'uomo, Giunti Editore, Florence, 2018
- Vento in scatola, with Glay Ghammouri, Sellerio Editore, Palermo, 2019
- Il borghese Pellegrino, Sellerio Editore, Palermo, 2020
- Chi si ferma è perduto, with Samantha Bruzzone, Sellerio Editore, Palermo, 2022
- Oscura e celeste, Giunti Editore, Florence, 2023
- La regina dei sentieri, with Samantha Bruzzone, Sellerio Editore, Palermo, 2024
- La scala di seta, with Samantha Bruzzone, Sellerio Editore, Palermo, 2026

=== Other short stories ===
- Cose che non puoi capire, in Igea e psiche. Racconti di vita sospesa, Felici Editore, Pisa, 2012
- Una notte da star, Né qui né fuori di qui, Il massacratore, Fuori dalla finestra e Raccolta differenziata, in Di cosa sono fatti i sogni, Rai Eri, Rome, 2016
- I rospi sono una cosa seria, in Animali in giallo, with Samantha Bruzzone, Sellerio Editore, Palermo, 2024
- Il mese del ripensamento, in Dodici mesi in giallo, with Samantha Bruzzone, Sellerio Editore, Palermo, 2025
- Il confine tra terra e cielo, in Italia in giallo, with Samantha Bruzzone, Sellerio Editore, Palermo, 2026

=== Essays ===
- Sol levante e pioggia battente, on RCS Quotidiani - Corriere della Sera - Inediti d'autore, Milan, 2011
- Scacco alla torre, Felici Editore, Pisa, 2011
- La pillola del giorno prima. Vaccini, epidemie, catastrofi, paure e verità, with Roberto Vacca, Transeuropa, Massa, 2012
- Tra foce e pineta. Volti, paesaggi e parole dal litorale pisano, with Nicola Ughi and Cristina Barsantini, ETS, Pisa, 2012
- La famiglia Tortilla, EDT, Turin, 2014
- Capra e calcoli. L'eterna lotta tra gli algoritmi e il caos, with Dino Leporini, Laterza, Rome-Bari, 2014
- Il maestro, in Almanacco Sellerio 2014-2015, Sellerio Editore, Palermo, 2014
- Le regole del gioco. Storie di sport e altre scienze inesatte, Rizzoli Libri, Milan, 2015
- L'infinito tra parentesi. Storia sentimentale della scienza da Omero a Borges, Rizzoli Libri, Milan, 2016
- Le due teste del tiranno. Metodi matematici per la libertà, Rizzoli Libri, Milan, 2017
- L'architetto dell'invisibile ovvero come pensa un chimico. Scienza e idee, Raffaello Cortina Editore, Milan, 2017
- Per ridere aggiungere acqua. Piccolo saggio sull'umorismo e il linguaggio, Rizzoli Libri, Milan, 2018
- Caos, with Stefano Marmi, Il Mulino, Bologna, 2019
- La misura del virus. Dalla peste al Covid-19: antiche pandemie e difese nuove, with Roberto Vacca, Mondadori, Milan, 2020
- La direzione del pensiero. Matematica e filosofia per distinguere cause e conseguenze, Raffaello Cortina Editore, Milan, 2020
- Cultura e scienza, with Vito Mancuso and Guido Tonelli, Aras Edizioni, Fano, 2021
- Il secondo principio, Il Mulino, Bologna, 2021
- Dodici. Un numero che mette d'accordo, Il Mulino, Bologna, 2024
- Rigore di testa. Storie di pallone, paradossi, algoritmi: il calcio e i numeri come non li avevate mai immaginati, with Paolo Cintia, Giunti Editore, Florence, 2024
- Se fossi stato al vostro posto. Ragionevole dubbio e matematiche risoluzioni, Raffaello Cortina Editore, Milan, 2025
- Scimmia Sapiens. Lettera a un adolescente sull'intelligenza artificiale, Bompiani, Milan-Florence, 2026

=== Children's books ===
- Leonardo e la marea, with Samantha Bruzzone, Laterza, Rome-Bari, 2015
- Il Castello dalle Mille Botole. Favola per far restare svegli i bambini, Sellerio Editore, Palermo, 2020
- Chiusi fuori, with Samantha Bruzzone, Mondadori, Milan, 2022
- La molla e il cellulare. Che differenza c'è tra una scoperta e un'invenzione?, with Samantha Bruzzone, Raffaello Cortina Editore, Milan, 2022
- Perché studiare chimica (non) è difficile, Mondadori, Milan, 2023
- Non c'è un cane, with Samantha Bruzzone, Mondadori, Milan, 2024

=== Translations ===
- Game for Five, translated by Howard Curtis, Europa Editions, New York, 2014
- Three-card Monte, translated by Howard Curtis, Europa Editions, New York, 2014
- The Art of Killing Well, translated by Howard Curtis, MacLehose Press, London, 2014
- The Measure of a Man, translated by Howard Curtis and Katherine Gregor, Europa Editions, New York, 2019
- Foul Deeds and Fine Dying, translated by Howard Curtis, MacLehose Press, London, 2023
