= The Guest (2018 film) =

2018 Italian-French film

- Directed by: Duccio Chiarini
- Screenplay by: Duccio Chiarini; Roan Johnson; Davide Lantieri; Marco Pettenello
- Starring: Daniele Parisi; Silvia D'Amico
- Cinematography: Baris Özbiçer
- Music by: Tyler Ramsey; Brunori Sas
- Release date: 2018
- Language: Italian

The Guest (Italian: L'ospite) is a 2018 Italian romantic comedy-drama film co-written and directed by Duccio Chiarini.

The film premiered in the Piazza Grande section at the 71st edition of the Locarno Festival, in which it won the Swiss Critics Boccalino Award for Best Film.

== Cast ==
- Daniele Parisi: Guido
- Silvia D'Amico: Chiara
- Anna Bellato: Lucia
- Thony: Roberta
