= How Strange to Be Named Federico =

- Film poster
- Italian: Che strano chiamarsi Federico
- Directed by: Ettore Scola
- Starring: Federico Fellini; Maurizio De Santis; Giulio Forges Davanzati
- Release date: September 6, 2013 (Venice)
- Running time: 90 minutes
- Country: Italy
- Language: Italian

How Strange to Be Named Federico (Italian: Che strano chiamarsi Federico) is a 2013 documentary film directed by Ettore Scola. The film documents Scola's relationship with his friend and inspiration, film director Federico Fellini. Scola has described it as "the little portrait of a great man".

== Content ==
It begins with the 19-year-old Fellini arriving in Rome and walking into the office of the magazine Marc'Aurelio.

== Release ==
The film premiered out of competition at the 2013 Venice Film Festival.
