= The Last Prosecco =

2017 film by Antonio Padovan

- Theatrical release poster
- Italian: Finché c'è prosecco c'è speranza
- Directed by: Antonio Padovan
- Screenplay by: Fulvio Ervas; Antonio Padovan; Marco Pettenello
- Based on: Finché c'è prosecco c'è speranza by Fulvio Ervas
- Produced by: Valentina Zanella
- Starring: Giuseppe Battiston; Teco Celio; Liz Solari; Silvia D'Amico; Roberto Citran; Gisella Burinato; Babak Karimi; Mirko Artuso; Paolo Cioni; Diego Pagotto; Vitaliano Trevisan; Rade Šerbedžija
- Cinematography: Massimo Moschin
- Edited by: Paolo Cottignola
- Music by: Teho Teardo
- Production company: K+
- Distributed by: Parthénos
- Release dates: 29 October 2017 (Rome); 31 October 2017 (Italy)
- Running time: 101 minutes
- Country: Italy
- Language: Italian
- Box office: €483,348 (Italy)

The Last Prosecco (Italian: Finché c'è prosecco c'è speranza, lit. 'As Long as There's Prosecco, There's Hope') is a 2017 Italian giallo comedy film co-written and directed by Antonio Padovan in his first feature film, based on the 2010 Italian novel Finché c'è prosecco c'è speranza by co-screenwriter Fulvio Ervas. Set mainly in the Province of Treviso, the area of the Veneto region where Prosecco grapes are grown, the film follows an awkward police inspector (Giuseppe Battiston) assigned to investigate a bizarre suicide followed swiftly by two murders. The film spotlights the Prosecco-making world while incorporating "a strong environmental message". The film has "captivated audiences through the expression of the magic and charm" of a "unique region of Italy."

== Synopsis ==
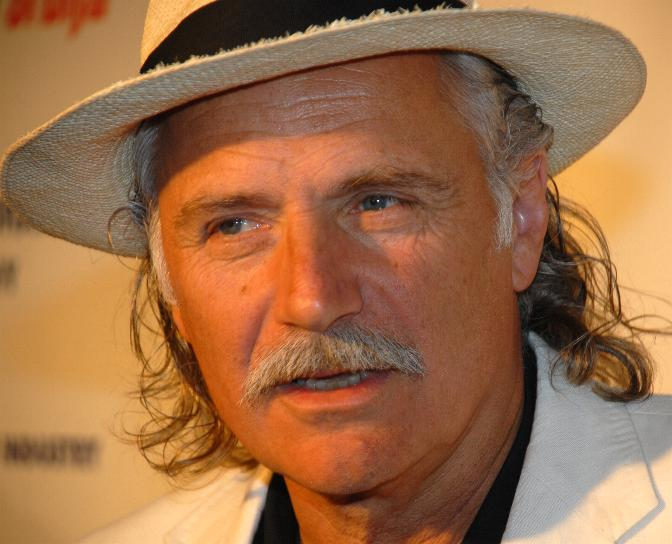
Rade Šerbedžija

In the hills of Conegliano and Valdobbiadene, the dashing, opinionated Count Ancillotto (Rade Šerbedžija), as unstinting in his criticism of a nearby pollution-producing factory as he is proud of his family's heritage of making the finest Prosecco, kills himself with the flair and style that have marked his life. The motives for his suicide are unknown; the mystery only deepens when a couple of the count's best-known enemies are gunned down. Police inspector Stucky (Giuseppe Battiston), an awkward outsider of half-Persian descent, is assigned to the baffling case in which the main suspect is a dead man. Inexperienced and in new territory, Stucky trudges through the villages' unresolved issues, before realising the key to solving the mystery lies in understanding the culture of the Prosecco Hills themselves. The trail leads Stucky to, among others, the count's mistress (Silvia D'Amico), his estranged daughter (Liz Solari), a crazed gravedigger (Teco Celio), and an exclusive Prosecco brotherhood, but the real revelation for the policeman is the late count's credo of savouring the finer things in life and fighting to preserve them.

== Cast ==
- Giuseppe Battiston as Stucky
- Teco Celio as Isacco Pitusso
- Liz Solari as Celinda Salvatierra
- Silvia D'Amico as Francesca Beltrame
- Roberto Citran as Sergio Leonardi
- Gisella Burinato as Adele Toniut
- Babak Karimi as Uncle Cyrus
- Mirko Artuso as Oste Secondo
- Paolo Cioni as Landrulli
- Diego Pagotto as Guerra
- Vitaliano Trevisan as Shooting range owner
- Rade Šerbedžija as Desiderio Ancillotto
- Antonio Scarpa as Kosovar boss
- Gabriele Tabacco as Alvise
- Nicoletta Maragno as Waitress
- Vasco Mirandola as Dr. Sartori
- Andrea Appi as Speggiorin
- Giovanni Betto as Belendi
- Sandro Buzzatti as Grand master

== Themes ==
The Last Prosecco has been described as a story about "the inheritance of beauty and the value of quality", and the conflict between greed and respect for the land, that is, "those who are driven to exploit the environment and those who are called to protect it at all costs." In that sense it is an environmentalist film which "forces us to remember that anyone who destroys the land destroys the future for everyone." On its launch, Antonio Padovan called the film "an investigation filled with reflections on the future we want. An ode to going slowly, savouring life. The portrait of a tangled space between progress and tradition." His director's notes outline further themes: "the relationship between generations, travel, diversity. Love, but not the banal type. The value of beauty, but without presumption. A love letter to a territory tangled up in progress and tradition, excellence and shame. A sincere letter. Written with my heart in my hand."

== Production ==
=== Background and inspiration ===
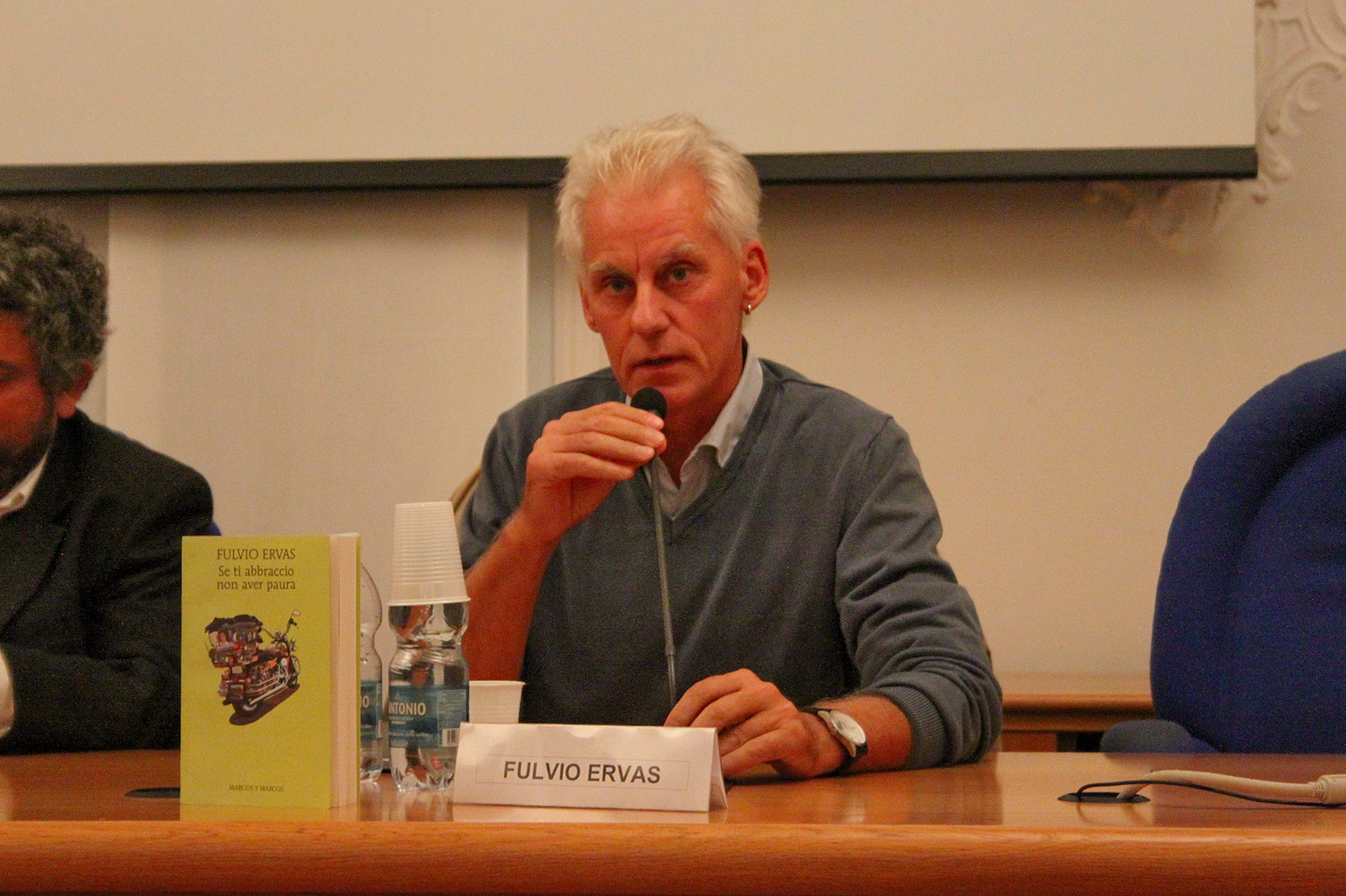
Fulvio Ervas

Antonio Padovan was born and raised between the Prosecco hills in Conegliano, a small town near Venice. In 2007, he moved to New York City, where he interned and then worked for an architectural firm, eventually transitioning to a successful career in commercials, videos and short films. In 2016, he returned to his hills near Venice to shoot his first feature film.

When asked what made him choose to return home to make his first feature film, Padovan revealed that he had been faced with a crossroads: he had been considering directing an English coming-of-age story, something like Stand by Me with elements of The Goonies and Stranger Things, but while on a ten-day vacation in Italy, his sister Mariangela suggested he read the 2010 novel Finché c'è Prosecco c'è Speranza by Fulvio Ervas. The novel, which takes place in Padovan's (and the author's) native Veneto region, impressed him for its story, but it was also out of nostalgia that he decided that his first feature film should be shot in the place he grew up, "in his own house" (l'avrei girato "a casa mia"). At the film's launch, he spoke of his determination to reveal the "small archipelago of gentle quilted reliefs of vineyards", his aim to "point the magnifying glass" on a geographic area, the Veneto, rarely explored by Italian cinema.

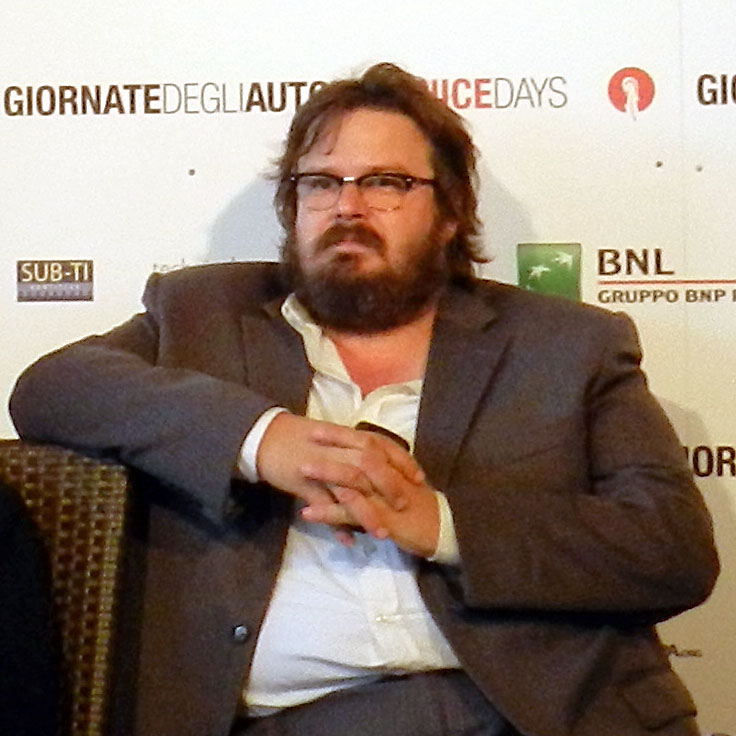
Giuseppe Battiston at the 68th Venice Film Festival, in 2011

=== Development and writing ===
Padovan's first feature film was a two-year project. He hoped to revive the giallo film, after years of the genre being more or less confined to television. He collaborated with Marco Pettenello and the novel's author Fulvio Ervas to write the screenplay, which involved making quite a few changes from the novel. The film's working title was L'ultimo desiderio. Eras said it was not easy to translate the language of the novel into a visual language, but it was educational, and seeing his story and characters come to life was a beautiful emotion, and greatly satisfying. Inspector Stucky, the main character in his series of giallo novels, had now acquired the face and body of Giuseppe Battiston, and influenced Eras as he wrote his next Stucky novel, C’era il mare: the character of Stucky was, in a sense, no longer imaginary but "real" to him now.

=== Financing ===
Antonio Padovan said that The Last Prosseco did not receive public funding from any level of government, nor from producers of Prosecco itself. Nicola Fedrigoni stated that he and Valentina Zanella had spent years looking for a project that would celebrate the Veneto region and its beauty with a compelling story, and accepted the draft screenplay without hesitation as soon as it was submitted. They quickly found support locally from the Treviso Film Commission, the Chamber of Commerce, and the Marcha Trevigiana (March of Treviso) consortium of tourist promoters, as well as Otlav, NaturaSI, and the Masie Foundation.

=== Filming ===
Principal photography began on 17 October 2016 and was scheduled to end on 12 November. The film was shot in the Veneto's winemaking regions, particularly the Prosecco Hills in the Province of Treviso, which extend over more than 440 square kilometres. Shooting locations included Conegliano, Farra di Soligo, Revine Lago, Rolle, San Pietro di Feletto, Tarzo and Valdobbiadene, most of them key wine-producing towns and villages. Filming also took place in Treviso and Venice.

In Conegliano, Villa Gera Amadio Maresio stood for the count's villa in exterior shots, while the Palazzo Minucci De Carlo in Vittorio Veneto served for interior shots. The count's vineyards were the Valdobbiadene vineyards of the Dalla Libera family, while the wine cellar is that of the Da Gigetto restaurant in Miane: 1600 wine labels that rest at a depth of 18 metres, around a well with spring water. Other restaurants and vineyards from the region also appear, including those of Angelo Bortolin (producer of Prosecco Docg).

=== Marketing and related works ===
A special "cinema" edition of Finché c'è Prosecco c'è Speranza was issued by publisher Marcos y Marcos, as well as a photographic film diary.

== Release ==
The Last Prosecco had its premiere at the Rome Film Festival's independent Alice in the City festival on 29 October 2017, where it "captivated audiences through the expression of the magic and charm" of the Veneto region. A general release in Italy followed on 31 October, the run in theatres lasting for over two months. The film has been shown at numerous international film festivals, including Cape Town in 2017, where it won the award for cinematography, and the 2018 Italian Film Festival of Madrid, where it was the closing feature.

=== Home media and streaming ===
In Italy, The Last Prosecco is available on DVD from IBS.it, and for streaming from Noleggio and as a digital download from Trova.

== Reception ==
=== Commercial performance ===
During its opening weekend in Italy (31 October 2017), The Last Prosecco is reported to have taken US$389,871. The film eventually took €483,348 at the box office in Italy overall.

=== Critical response ===
The Last Prosecco was well received by audiences and, despite changes made to the story, by fans of the novel. Andrea Fornasiero argues the film's tone is more like a television episode than a traditional giallo film and compares it to the Italian giallo television series I delitti del Bar Lume, which avoids the excesses of gloom typical of the genre. Stucky's Conegliano is a lot like Salvo Montalbano's Vigàta. The film eschews realism and ambiguity: Stucky's only obstacle seems to be his superior, but even this character in the end is also revealed to have a heart of gold, showing we are very far removed from any chiaroscuro representation of the police. David Lanzafame remarks that the film is more of "a warm-hearted environmental film" rather than a murder mystery:

More humorous than dark or violent, The Last Prosecco moseys through its mystery with lots of sweeping views of the Veneto region. The light plot serves as more of a guide for the audience to experience the beautiful vistas and perhaps, like our characters, to fall in love with the land. As far as it is an environmental film, Padovan lets the land and the people who live there speak for themselves, and it delivers its message with a softer, more humorous touch.

=== Accolades ===
Award

- Best Cinematography, Cape Town International Film Market & Festival (Cape Town, 2017)

Special mention

- Mention spéciale du public, Italian Film Festival of Toulouse (Les rencontres du cinéma italien à Toulouse, Toulouse, 2017)

Notable nominations

- Mario Verdone Award (one of three finalists at the 19th Lecce European Film Festival, Lecce, 2018)
- Nastro d'Argento (Silver Ribbon, Italian National Syndicate of Film Journalists, 2018) • Best Actor (Giuseppe Battiston)
- Italian Golden Globe (2018) • Best First Feature • Best Screenplay
