= Socks and Cakes =

- Film poster
- Directed by: Antonio Padovan
- Written by: Antonio Padovan
- Produced by: Merry Colomer; Marta Jover; John Kontoyannis
- Starring: Kirsty Meares; Timothy J. Cox; Jeff Moffitt; Ben Prayz; Alex Vincent
- Cinematography: Alessandro Penazzi
- Edited by: Antonio Padovan
- Production company: Kimistra Films
- Release date: January 29, 2010
- Running time: 13 minutes
- Country: United States
- Language: English

Socks and Cakes is a 2010 American short slice of life written and directed by Antonio Padovan and starring Kirsty Meares, Timothy J. Cox, Jeff Moffitt, Ben Prayz and Alex Vincent. The short was also Padovan's first student film, and won a Golden Ace Award at the 2010 Las Vegas Film Festival.

== Plot ==
Harry (Timothy J. Cox) is a misanthropic French literature professor who is just taking his life one day at a time, getting by with just enough to survive. His ex-wife Amanda (Kirsty Meares) is now married to Harry's best friend, Richard (Jeff Moffitt), an architect. Both seem to put on a positive front that all is well with their marriage, but Amanda has her doubts and Richard has a wandering eye, especially when he meets the free-spirited, innocent, Sophie (Alex Vincent). Sophie has come to the party with her current boyfriend, the older and always grinning real estate broker, David (Ben Prayz).

== Cast ==
- Kirsty Meares as Amanda
- Timothy J. Cox as Harry Mogulevsky
- Jeff Moffitt as Richard
- Ben Prayz as David
- Alex Vincent as Sophie

== Production background ==
In 2007, at the age of twenty, Antonio Padovan moved from Italy to live in New York City to take up an internship at an architectural firm. After a couple of years, finding himself working twelve-hour days and often weekends, Padovan realized the career was not for him: "I've always loved films, I own myself probably 2000 DVDs, but back in Italy I never thought I could have been part of it." One night, after seeing a Woody Allen film at the cinema, he was inspired and the next morning enrolled in an eight-week course in film directing at the New York Film Academy instead of going to work. Despite this, the firm continued to give him projects, and he began to divide his time between architecture and wandering Manhattan with a camera on his shoulder; at the end of the program, after completing Socks and Cakes he received a full scholarship to come back for another year.

== Reception ==
Padovan's first short film impressed not only his professors, but also the judges at the 2010 Las Vegas film festival, where it won a Golden Ace Award.
