= Roan Johnson =

Italian director and screenwriter (born 1975)

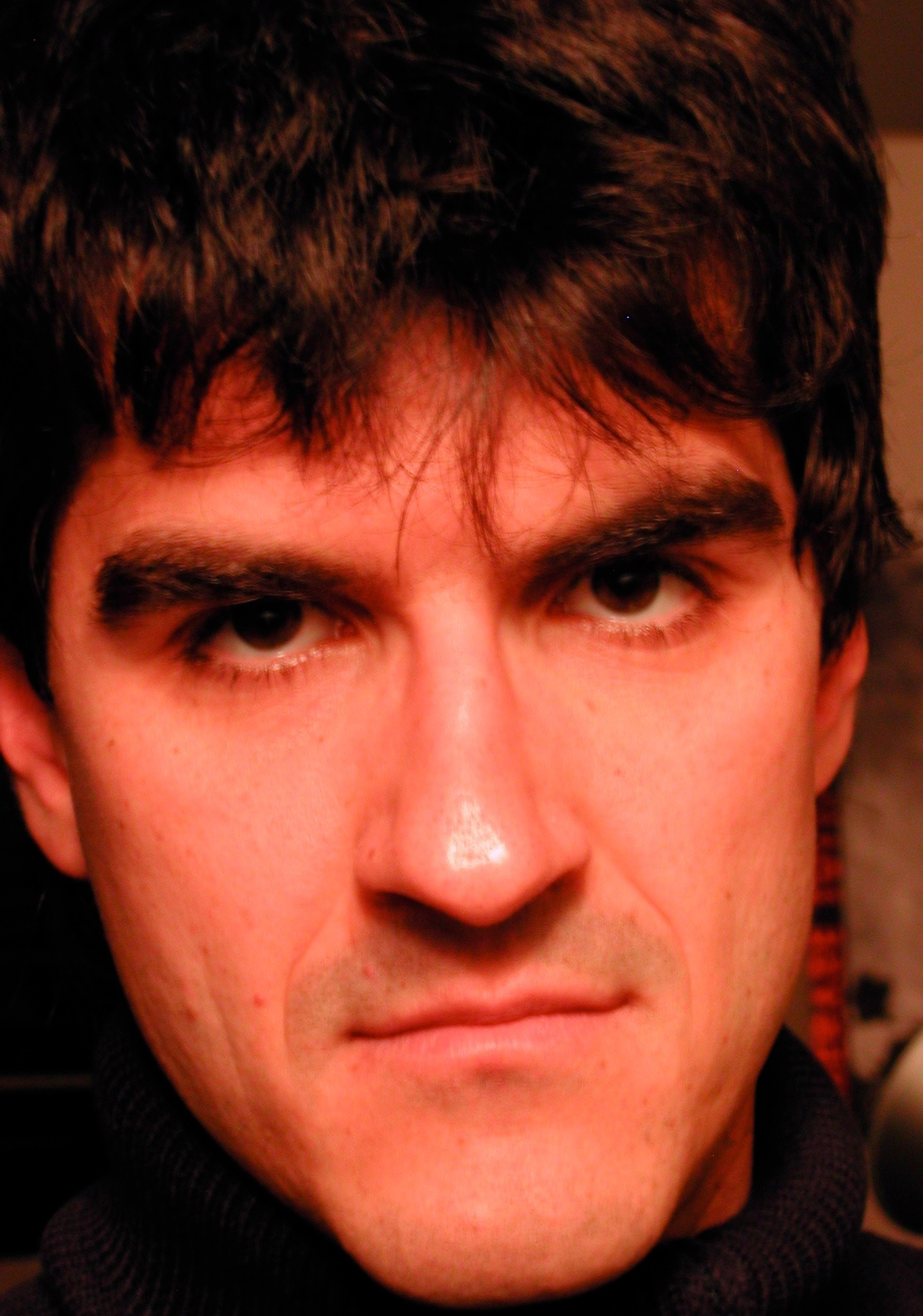
- Born: Roan Occam Anthony Johnson; 14 March 1975 (age 51); London, England, UK
- Education: University of Pisa
- Occupations: Director, Screenwriter
- Years active: 2002–present

Roan Occam Anthony Johnson (born 14 March 1975) is an Italian director and screenwriter.

== Biography ==
Born in London from an English father and a mother from Matera, Johnson grew up in Pisa, where he attended the University and graduated in Modern Literature. In 1999, Johnson moved to Rome and attended the National Film School.

After he began his career as a TV screenwriter, Johnson made his first feature film in 2011, The First on the List, starring Claudio Santamaria. His second film, So Far So Good, was presented at the 2014 Rome Film Festival, where it was awarded with the Public Prize. His third film, Piuma, was presented in competition at the 73rd Venice International Film Festival.

Johnson is also an academic: he taught in 2008 Italian Cinema at the John Cabot University in Rome and held a Screenwriting Laboratory at the University of Pisa from 2003 to 2007.

== Filmography ==
=== Director ===
- The First on the List (2011)
- So Far So Good (2014)
- Piuma (2016)
- State a casa (2021)
- Rider (2026) with Davide Pavanello

=== Screenwriter ===
- Now or Never (2003)
- Sinestesia (2010)
- The First on the List (2011)
- So Far So Good (2014)
- Piuma (2016)
- The Guest (2018)
