= Medusa Film =

Italian film production and distribution company

Medusa Film S.p.A.
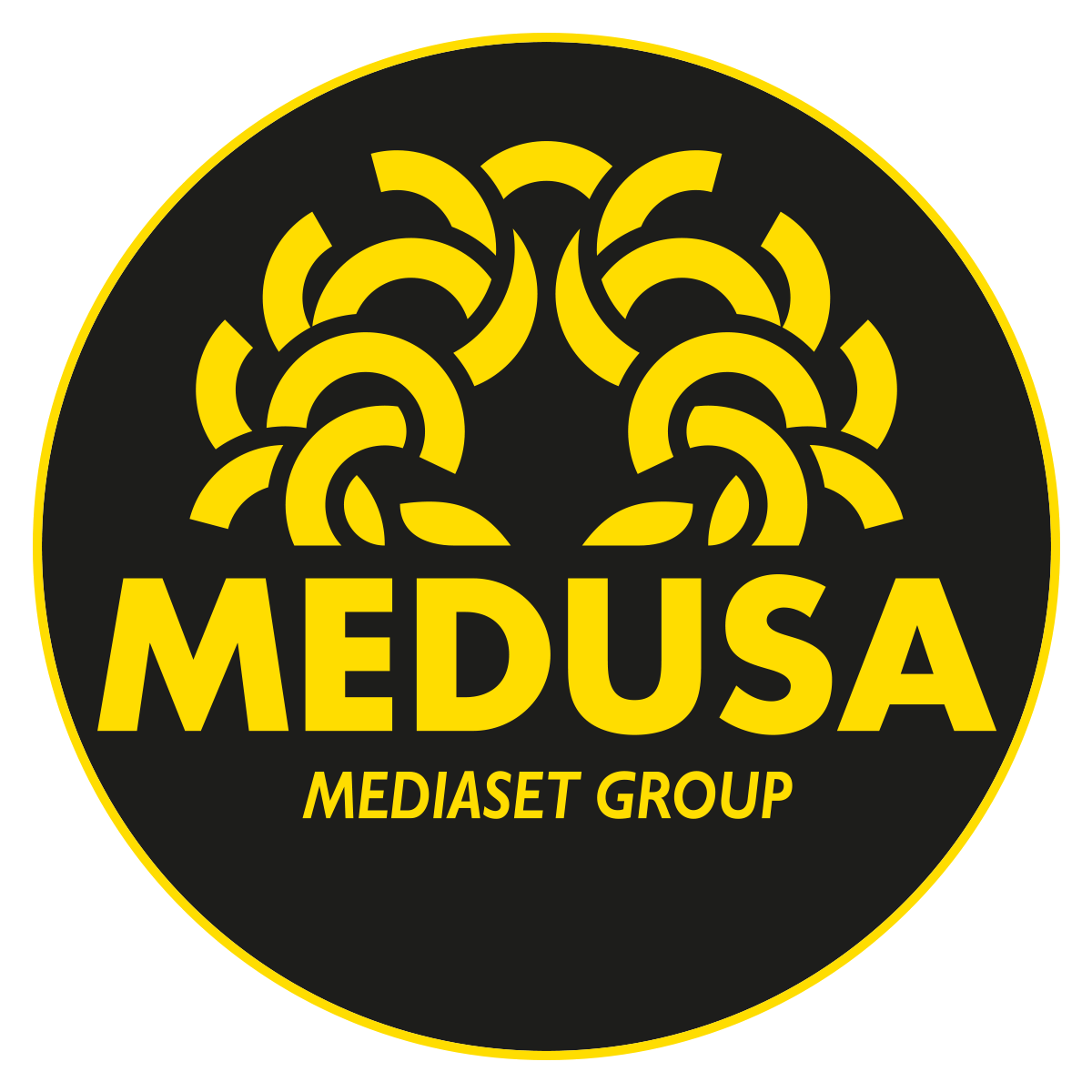
- Formerly: Penta Film (1989-1995)
- Type: Società per azioni (S.p.A.)
- Industry: Films
- Founded: 1964; 62 years ago
- Founder: Felice Colaiacomo; Franco Poccioni
- Headquarters: Rome, Italy
- Products: Feature films
- Parent: Mediaset
- Website: medusa.it

Medusa Film S.p.A. is an Italian film production and distribution company owned by Mediaset. It is one of the top film producers and distributors in the country.

== History ==
Medusa Distribuzione S.p.A. was founded by Felice Colaiacono and Franco Poccioni in 1964. Initially only focused on distribution, thanks to executive producer Franco Rossellini, in the 1970s the company began collaborating with other production companies, including Devon Film and Luciano Martino's Dania Film, and co-produced successful genre films and comedies. In 1983, Poccioni became the sole administrator of the company.

In July 1986, Reteitalia, a subsidiary of Silvio Berlusconi's Fininvest, acquired a 49% ownership interest in Medusa. Two years later, in 1988, Reteitalia took full ownership of the company, however, the following year, Medusa was subsequently absorbed into Penta Film.

In 1995, Penta Film was dissolved and Medusa Film was restored. Carlo Bernasconi was appointed president, and the company resumed operations in 1996. In 1999, Medusa announced that it would begin producing its own films. That year, Riccardo Tozzi} signed a five-year contract to produce films for the company. Following the death of Bernasconi in 2001, Marina Berlusconi was appointed president of Medusa.

In 2002, Variety reported that Medusa Film was the second leading film distributor in Italy, holding 14% of the country's total market share. In 2005, the European Audiovisual Observatory reported that Medusa was the fourth leading film distributor in Italy, holding 10.3% of the country's total market share.

In July 2007, Medusa Film was sold to Mediaset, and Pier Silvio Berlusconi was appointed to its board of directors. Around 2010, Medusa Film signed screenwriter Fausto Brizzi to a four-film deal, for which they collaborated with the films Women vs. Men (2011), Love Is in the Air (2012), and Guess Who's Coming for Christmas? (2013), and Se mi vuoi bene (2019).

In November 2012, Medusa sold its home video division to Warner Bros. Italia.

== Production credits ==
=== 1990s ===
Year	Title	Director	Ref.
1997	The Good Bad Guy	Ezio Greggio	
1999	Midsummer Night's Dance	Pupi Avati	

=== 2000s ===
Year	Title	Director	Ref.
2000	Ask Me If I'm Happy	Aldo, Giovanni & Giacomo, Massimo Venier	
2000	Holy Tongue	Carlo Mazzacurati	
2000	Malèna	Giuseppe Tornatore	
2000	Si fa presto a dire amore	Enrico Brignano	
2000	Teste di cocco	Ugo Fabrizio Giordani	
2000	Tandem	Lucio Pellegrini	
2001	Aida of the Trees	Guido Manuli	
2001	Bad Women	Fabio Conversi	
2001	Caruso, Zero for Conduct	Francesco Nuti	
2001	Gosford Park	Robert Altman	
2001	He Died with a Felafel in His Hand	Richard Lowenstein	
2001	The Last Kiss	Gabriele Muccino	
2001	Ravanello pallido	Gianni Costantino	
2001	South Kensington	Carlo Vanzina	
2001	Triumph of Love	Clare Peploe	
2001	Unfair Competition	Ettore Scola	
2001	Without Filter	Mimmo Raimondi	
2002	Amnèsia	Gabriele Salvatores	
2002	Bimba - È clonata una stella	Sabina Guzzanti	
2002	Callas Forever	Franco Zeffirelli	
2002	Come se fosse amore	Roberto Burchielli	
2002	Da zero a dieci	Luciano Ligabue	
2002	The Legend of Al, John and Jack	Aldo, Giovanni & Giacomo, Massimo Venier	
2002	Sleepless	Dario Argento	
2002	Two Friends	Spiro Scimone, Francesco Sframeli	
2003	B.B. e il cormorano	Edoardo Gabbriellini	
2003	Break Free	Gianluca Maria Tavarelli	
2003	The Card Player	Dario Argento	
2003	The Dreamers	Bernardo Bertolucci	
2003	I'm Not Scared	Gabriele Salvatores	
2003	Instructing the Heart	Giovanni Morricone	
2003	Remember Me, My Love	Gabriele Muccino	
2003	Strange Crime	Roberto Andò	
2003	Totò Sapore e la magica storia della pizza	Maurizio Forestieri	
2004	Christmas Rematch	Pupi Avati	
2004	The Consequences of Love	Paolo Sorrentino	
2004	Do You Know Claudia?	Massimo Venier	
2004	Don't Move	Sergio Castellitto	
2004	First Love	Matteo Garrone, Massimo Gaudioso	
2004	Immortal	Enki Bilal	
2004	Se devo essere sincera	Davide Ferrario	
2004	Secret Agents	Frédéric Schoendoerffer	
2004	Working Slowly (Radio Alice)	Guido Chiesa	
2005	The Days of Abandonment	Roberto Faenza	
2005	I Love You in Every Language in the World	Leonardo Pieraccioni	
2005	Never Again as Before	Giacomo Campiotti	
2005	L'orizzonte degli eventi	Daniele Vicari	
2005	Provincia meccanica	Stefano Mordini	
2005	Quo Vadis, Baby?	Gabriele Salvatores	
2005	Texas	Fausto Paravidino	
2005	Tickets	Ermanno Olmi, Abbas Kiarostami, Ken Loach	
2005	Too Beautiful	Ugo Fabrizio Giordani	
2006	The Caiman	Nanni Moretti	
2006	The Family Friend	Paolo Sorrentino	
2006	Napoleon and Me	Paolo Virzì	
2006	Olé	Carlo Vanzina	
2006	Our Land	Sergio Rubini	
2006	Secret Journey	Roberto Andò	
2006	The Stone Merchant	Renzo Martinelli	
2006	The Unknown Woman	Giuseppe Tornatore	
2006	Vita Smeralda	Jerry Calà	
2007	Il 7 e l'8	Giambattista Avellino, Ficarra e Picone	
2007	A Beautiful Wife	Leonardo Pieraccioni	
2007	Come tu mi vuoi	Volfango De Biasi	
2007	A Dinner for Them to Meet	Pupi Avati	
2007	Don't Waste Your Time, Johnny!	Fabrizio Bentivoglio	
2007	The Girl by the Lake	Andrea Molaioli	
2007	In memoria di me	Furio Monicelli	
2007	Matrimonio alle Bahamas	Claudio Risi	
2007	Mother of Tears	Dario Argento	
2007	SMS - Sotto mentite spoglie	Vincenzo Salemme	
2007	The Sweet and the Bitter	Andrea Porporati	
2008	L'allenatore nel pallone 2	Sergio Martino	
2008	Il cosmo sul comò	Marcello Cesena	
2008	Un'estate al mare	Carlo Vanzina	
2008	La fidanzata di papà	Enrico Oldoini	
2008	Giovanna's Father	Pupi Avati	
2008	The Man Who Loves	Maria Sole Tognazzi	
2008	No Problem	Vincenzo Salemme	
2008	Scusa ma ti chiamo amore	Federico Moccia	
2008	The Seed of Discord	Pappi Corsicato	
2008	Your Whole Life Ahead of You	Paolo Virzì	
2009	Amore 14	Federico Moccia	
2009	Baarìa	Giuseppe Tornatore	
2009	The Big Dream	Michele Placido	
2009	The Case of Unfaithful Klara	Roberto Faenza	
2009	Ce n'è per tutti	Luciano Melchionna	
2009	The Double Hour	Giuseppe Capotondi	
2009	Un'estate ai Caraibi	Carlo Vanzina	
2009	Iago	Volfango De Biasi	
2009	La matassa	Giambattista Avellino, Ficarra e Picone	
2009	Le Premier Cercle	Laurent Tuel	
2009	Me and Marilyn	Leonardo Pieraccioni	
2009	Pope Joan	Sönke Wortmann	
2009	Questo piccolo grande amore	Riccardo Donna	

=== 2010s ===
Year	Title	Director	Ref.
2010	Benvenuti al Sud	Luca Miniero	
2010	The First Beautiful Thing	Paolo Virzì	
2010	Kiss Me Again	Gabriele Muccino	
2010	A Natale mi sposo	Paolo Costella	
2010	The Santa Claus Gang	Paolo Genovese	
2010	Sharm el Sheikh - Un'estate indimenticabile	Ugo Fabrizio Giordani	
2010	Somewhere	Sofia Coppola	
2010	Tutto l'amore del mondo	Riccardo Grandi	
2010	La vita è una cosa meravigliosa	Carlo Vanzina	
2010	The Youngest Son	Pupi Avati	
2011	Baciato dalla fortuna	Paolo Costella	
2011	The Big Heart of Girls	Pupi Avati	
2011	Finalmente la felicità	Leonardo Pieraccioni	
2011	The Immature	Paolo Genovese	
2011	The Last Fashion Show	Carlo Vanzina	
2011	I soliti idioti: Il film	Enrico Lando	
2011	Things from Another World	Francesco Patierno	
2011	This Must Be the Place	Paolo Sorrentino	
2011	Wedding in Paris	Claudio Risi	
2011	Women vs. Men	Fausto Brizzi	
2012	Benvenuti al Nord	Luca Miniero	
2012	Buona giornata	Carlo Vanzina	
2012	The Immature: The Trip	Paolo Genovese	
2012	Love Is in the Air	Fausto Brizzi	
2012	Me and You	Bernardo Bertolucci	
2012	A Perfect Family	Paolo Genovese	
2012	To Rome with Love	Woody Allen	
2012	Twice Born	Sergio Castellitto	
2013	Alberto il grande	Carlo Verdone, Luca Verdone	
2013	Ci vuole un gran fisico	Sophie Chiarello	
2013	Fuga di cervelli	Paolo Ruffini	
2013	The Great Beauty	Paolo Sorrentino	
2013	Guess Who's Coming for Christmas?	Fausto Brizzi	
2013	Out of the Blue	Edoardo Leo	
2013	Universitari - Molto più che amici	Federico Moccia	
2014	Andiamo a quel paese	Ficarra e Picone	
2014	Blame Freud	Paolo Genovese	
2014	Perez.	Edoardo De Angelis	
2014	The Rich, the Pauper and the Butler	Aldo, Giovanni e Giacomo	
2014	Sapore di te	Carlo Vanzina	
2014	Soap Opera	Alessandro Genovesi	
2015	Belli di papà	Guido Chiesa	
2015	Italiano medio	Maccio Capatonda	
2015	Le leggi del desiderio	Silvio Muccino	
2015	Matrimonio al Sud	Paolo Costella	
2015	The Wait	Piero Messina	
2015	What a Beautiful Surprise	Alessandro Genovesi	
2015	Youth	Paolo Sorrentino	
2016	I babysitter	Giovanni Bognetti	
2016	Fuga da Reuma Park	Aldo, Giovanni e Giacomo	
2016	Perfect Strangers	Paolo Genovese	
2016	Quel bravo ragazzo	Enrico Lando	
2017	Caccia al tesoro	Carlo Vanzina	
2017	Classe Z	Guido Chiesa	
2017	The Girl in the Fog	Donato Carrisi	
2017	Mom or Dad?	Riccardo Milani	
2017	Omicidio all'italiana	Maccio Capatonda	
2017	The Place	Paolo Genovese	
2018	Amici come prima	Christian De Sica	
2018	Una festa esagerata	Vincenzo Salemme	
2018	My Big Gay Italian Wedding	Alessandro Genovesi	
2018	Se son rose	Leonardo Pieraccioni	
2018	Il sindaco - Italian Politics for Dummies	Davide Parenti, Claudio Canepari	
2018	Ti presento Sofia	Guido Chiesa	
2018	Vengo anch'io	Nuzzo e Di Biase	
2018	The Vice of Hope	Edoardo De Angelis	
2019	L'agenzia dei bugiardi	Volfango De Biasi	
2019	Domani è un altro giorno	Simone Spada	
2019	Into the Labyrinth	Donato Carrisi	
2019	Once Upon a Time... in Bethlehem	Ficarra e Picone	
2019	Scappo a casa	Enrico Lando	
2019	Se mi vuoi bene	Fausto Brizzi	
2019	Sono solo fantasmi	Christian De Sica	
2019	Tuttapposto	Gianni Costantino	

=== 2020s ===
Year	Title	Director	Ref.
2020	Cambio tutto!	Guido Chiesa	
2020	È per il tuo bene	Rolando Ravello	
2020	When Mom Is Away... With the Family	Alessandro Genovesi	
2021	Con tutto il cuore	Vincenzo Salemme	
2021	Mollo tutto e apro un chiringuito	Il Terzo Segreto di Satira	
2021	Una notte da dottore	Guido Chiesa	
2021	Superheroes	Paolo Genovese	
2021	Trafficante di virus	Costanza Quatriglio	
2022	Un mondo sotto social	Claudio Casisa, Annandrea Vitrano	
2022	Nostalgia	Mario Martone	
2022	Strangeness	Roberto Andò	
2022	The Tiger's Nest	Brando Quilici	
2022	Tutti a bordo	Luca Miniero	
2022	Vicini di casa	Paolo Costella	
2022	The Wedding Days	Massimo Venier	
2023	The First Day of My Life	Paolo Genovese	
2023	Massimo Troisi: Somebody Down There Likes Me	Mario Martone	
2023	Il migliore dei mondi	Danilo Carlani, Alessio Dogana, Maccio Capatonda	
2023	L'ultima volta che siamo stati bambini	Claudio Bisio	
2023	Volevo un figlio maschio	Neri Parenti	
2024	Criature	Cécile Allegra	
2024	Ricomincio da taaac	Il Terzo Segreto di Satira	
2024	I soliti idioti 3 - Il ritorno	Fabrizio Biggio, Francesco Mandelli, Ferruccio Martini	
2024	L'ultima settimana di settembre	Gianni De Blasi	
2024	A World Apart	Riccardo Milani	
2025	The Illusion	Roberto Andò	
2025	Attitudini: nessuna	Sophie Chiarello	
2025	Buen Camino	Gennaro Nunziante	
2025	Close to Me	Stefano Sardo	
2025	Giovanni Soldini – Il mio giro del mondo	Sydney Sibilia	
2025	Life Goes This Way	Riccardo Milani	
2025	Rino Gaetano – Sempre più blu	Giorgio Verdelli	
2025	When Mom Is Away... With the In-laws	Alessandro Genovesi	
2026	Children of the Monkey	Tommaso Landucci	
