= Aldo Baglio =

Italian actor and comedian (born 1958)

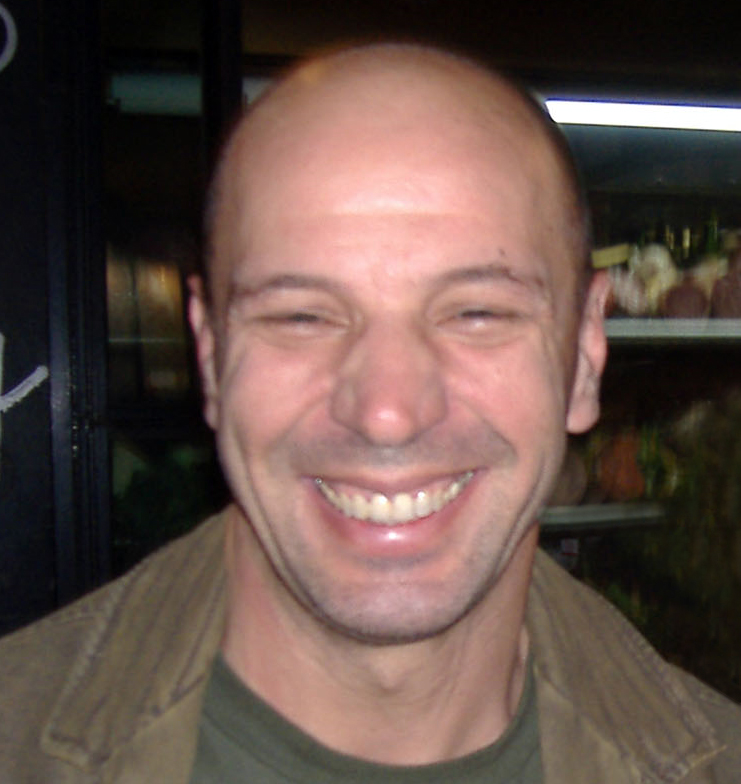
- Baglio in 2007
- Born: Cataldo Baglio; 28 September 1958 (age 67); Palermo, Italy
- Occupations: Actor, comedian, film director, screenwriter
- Years active: 1978–present

Cataldo "Aldo" Baglio (Italian: [(kat)ˈaldo ˈbaʎʎo]; born 28 September 1958) is an Italian actor, comedian, film director, and screenwriter, best known as a member of the comedy trio Aldo, Giovanni e Giacomo.

== Life and career ==
Raised in a modest family in Palermo, he moved to Milan in 1961, where he worked as a laborer and later at SIP. After earning a diploma from the mime-drama school at the Teatro Arsenale in Milan, he left his job to pursue a comedy career with Giovanni Storti, forming a duo that lasted about ten years. During this period, they appeared in television roles and met Giacomo Poretti, with whom they founded the trio "Aldo, Giovanni e Giacomo" in 1991. The trio achieved great success in Italy, initially through theater performances and appearances on TV shows such as those hosted by the Gialappa's Band, then with a series of hit films that broke box office records, including Three Men and a Leg (1997), That's Life (1998), Ask Me If I'm Happy (2000), and The Legend of Al, John and Jack (2002).

Alongside his work with the trio, Baglio also collaborated with Elio e le Storie Tese; his voice can be heard in the track "Mio cuggino" from their 1996 album Eat the Phikis. Recruited by director Giuseppe Tornatore, he played a small role in the 2009 film Baarìa.

In 2019, Baglio starred as the lead in Scappo a casa, his first solo project without Giovanni and Giacomo. He continued to appear solo in the 2022 comedy film A Breath of Fresh Air and in the documentary Con un battito di ciglia in 2024. That same year, he had a role in the second season of the Prime Video series The Bad Guy.

In 2025, Baglio starred in Riccardo Milani's comedy-drama Life Goes This Way.

== Personal life ==
Having lived in Lombardy since childhood, Baglio's natural accent is Milanese. His Sicilian accent, typical of his characters, was a deliberate artistic choice. Despite being from Sicily, he had to prepare to use it effectively.

Baglio has been married since 1996 to actress Silvana Fallisi, with whom he has often collaborated. They are parents to two children, Caterina and Gaetano. After years living between Milan and Monza, he moved with his family to Buccheri, his wife's hometown, during the COVID-19 pandemic.

== Filmography ==
Film
Year	Title	Role	Notes
1987	Kamikazen: Last Night in Milan	Client at the restaurant	Film debut
1997	Three Men and a Leg	Aldo	Also co-director and writer
1998	That's Life	Aldo	Also co-director and writer
1999	All the Moron's Men	Sakato	
2000	Ask Me If I'm Happy	Aldo	Also co-director and writer
2002	The Legend of Al, John and Jack	Al Caruso / Herbert	Also co-director and writer
2004	Do You Know Claudia?	Aldo	Also writer
2008	Il cosmo sul comò	Various	Also writer
2009	Baarìa	Businessman	
2010	The Santa Claus Gang	Aldo	Also writer
2013	Ci vuole un gran fisico	Taxi driver	Cameo role
2014	The Rich, the Pauper and the Butler	Aldo	Also co-director and writer
2016	Fuga da Reuma Park	Aldo	Also co-director and writer
2018	I'll Come Too	Police officer	
2019	Scappo a casa	Michele	Also writer
2020	I Hate Summer	Aldo	Also writer
2022	A Breath of Fresh Air	Salvo	Also writer
2022	The Wedding Days	Aldo	Also writer
2024	Con un battito di ciglia	Himself	Documentary
2025	Life Goes This Way	Mariano	

Television
Year	Title	Role	Notes
2024	The Bad Guy	Calogero Andrea Fasulo	TV series; 2 episodes
