= Andrea Guerra (composer) =

Italian composer

Andrea Guerra is an Italian composer. He is known for his film scores of Facing Windows (2003), Hotel Rwanda (2004), and The Pursuit of Happyness (2006).

== Biography ==
Guerra is the son of poet and screenwriter Tonino Guerra. He was born in October 1961 in the northern Italian town of Santarcangelo di Romagna. After studying composition and arrangement under maestro Ettore Ballotta, he moved to Rome where he began his career composing music for nature documentaries. In succeeding years, he wrote several film scores for directors such as Ferzan Özpetek, Roberto Faenza, Giuseppe Bertolucci, and others.

In 2015, he made his debut in Bollywood by composing the film score of the Dum Laga Ke Haisha. In 2016, he composed the background score for the Shah Rukh Khan-starrer Fan.

== Filmography ==
Year	Film	Directed by	Notes
1991	Especially on Sunday	Giuseppe Bertolucci	
1992	Narcos	Giuseppe Ferrara	
1994	Honey Sweet Love...	Enrico Coletti	
1994	Troppo sole	Giuseppe Bertolucci	
1994	Italia Village	Giancarlo Planta	
1995	Afraid to Love	Tonino Zangardi	
1996	Ulcera	Mario De Candia	Short film
1996	Gioco di squadra	Claudio del Punta	Short film
1997	Il tocco - La sfida	Enrico Coletti	
1997	Last Cut	Marcello Avallone	
1998	Men Behind Bars	Giancarlo Planta	
1998	Giochi d'equilibrio	Amedeo Fago	
1998	Femmina	Giuseppe Ferlito	
1999	The Protagonists	Luca Guadagnino	
1999	Indizio fatale	Marcello Avallone	TV movie
2000	First Light of Dawn	Lucio Gaudino	
2000	Medley - Brandelli di scuola	Gionata Zarantonello	
2000	Qualcuno da amare	Giuliana Gamba	TV movie
2000	Alice dalle 4 alle 5	Jonathan Zarantonello	Short film
2001	Lo strano caso del signor Kappa	Fabrizio Lori	
2001	Una lunga notte	Ilaria Cirino	TV movie
2001	The Ignorant Fairies	Ferzan Özpetek	
2001	Ama il tuo nemico 2	Damiano Damiani	TV movie
2001	Sailing Home	Vincenzo Marra	
2001	Empty Eyes	Andrea Porporati	
2001	Belgrado Sling	Riccardo Donna	
2002	Appuntamento al buio	Herbert Simone Paragnani	Short film
2002	The Angel's House	Giuliana Gamba	TV movie
2002	Semana santa	Pepe Danquart	
2002	La guerra è finita	Lodovico Gasparini	TV movie
2002	Respiro	Emanuele Crialese	
2002	Angela	Roberta Torre	
2002	The Soul Keeper	Roberto Faenza	
2002	I Am Emma	Francesco Falaschi	
2002	The Legend of Al, John and Jack	Massimo Venier and Aldo, Giovanni & Giacomo	
2003	Un posto tranquillo	Luca Manfredi	TV movie
2003	Facing Windows	Ferzan Özpetek	
2003	Past Perfect	Maria Sole Tognazzi	
2003	The Dog, the General, and the Birds	Francis Nielsen	
2003	Il vestito da sposa	Fiorella Infascelli	
2003	Take Me Away	Tonino Zangardi	
2003	Soraya	Lodovico Gasparini	TV movie
2003	Io no	Simona Izzo and Ricky Tognazzi	
2004	The Jokes	Carlo Vanzina	
2004	What Will Happen to Us	Giovanni Veronesi	
2004	Ogni volta che te ne vai	Davide Cocchi	
2004	Nero	Paul Marcus	TV movie
2004	Hotel Rwanda	Terry George	Co-composed with Rupert Gregson-Williams and Afro Celt Sound System
2004	Do You Know Claudia?	Massimo Venier	
2005	Briciole	Ilaria Cirino	TV movie
2005	Come into the Light	Roberto Faenza	
2005	Sacred Heart	Ferzan Özpetek	
2005	Il ritorno del Monnezza	Carlo Vanzina	
2005	Il mio amico Babbo Natale	Franco Amurri	TV movie
2006	The Goodbye Kiss	Michele Soavi	
2006	Mafalda of Savoy	Maurizio Zaccaro	TV movie
2006	The Pursuit of Happyness	Gabriele Muccino	
2006	Olé	Carlo Vanzina	
2006	Il mio amico Babbo Natale 2	Lucio Gaudino	TV movie
2007	Caccia segreta	Massimo Spano	TV movie
2007	The Man of Glass	Stefano Incerti	
2007	Donkey Xote	José Pozo	
2008	The Accidental Husband	Griffin Dunne	
2008	Parlami d'amore	Silvio Muccino	
2008	Heart of Fire	Luigi Falorni	
2008	Tonino Guerra: A Poet in the Movies	Nicola Tranquillino	
2008	Pa-Ra-Da	Marco Pontecorvo	
2008	A Perfect Day	Ferzan Özpetek	
2008	BirdWatchers	Marco Bechis	
2008	Coco Chanel	Christian Duguay	TV movie
2008	Dada's Dance	Zhang Yuan	
2009	The Collegno Amnesiac	Maurizio Zaccaro	TV movie
2009	Enrico Mattei: The Man who Looked to the Future	Giorgio Capitani	TV movie
2009	Top Secretaries	Angelo Longoni	TV movie
2009	Nine	Rob Marshall	
2010	Extraordinary Measures	Tom Vaughan	
2010	Augustine: The Decline of the Roman Empire	Christian Duguay	TV movie
2010	Parents and Children: Shake Well Before Using	Giovanni Veronesi	
2010	Letters to Juliet	Gary Winick	
2010	Goodbye Mr. Zeus!	Carlo Sarti	
2010	Pius XII: Under the Roman Sky	Christian Duguay	TV movie
2011	The Immature	Paolo Genovese	
2011	Atelier Fontana - Le sorelle della moda	Riccardo Milani	TV movie
2011	Amici miei – Come tutto ebbe inizio	Neri Parenti	
2011	L'amore fa male	Mirca Viola	
2011	Violetta	Antonio Frazzi	
2011	Someday This Pain Will Be Useful to You	Roberto Faenza	
2012	The Immature: The Trip	Paolo Genovese	
2012	Playing for Keeps	Gabriele Muccino	
2013	Volare - La grande storia di Domenico Modugno	Riccardo Milani	TV movie
2013	Welcome Mr. President	Riccardo Milani	
2013	White as Milk, Red as Blood	Giacomo Campiotti	
2013	The Referee	Paolo Zucca	
2013	How Strange to Be Named Federico	Ettore Scola	
2013	The Medicine Seller	Antonio Morabito	
2014	Ad esempio	Silvio Governi	Short film
2014	Amici come noi	Enrico Lando	
2014	Do You See Me?	Riccardo Milani	
2015	Dum Laga Ke Haisha	Sharat Katariya	Indian Hindi language Debut
2016	Fan	Maneesh Sharma	Indian Hindi language film
2017	Niente di Serio	Laszlo Barbo	
2018	Namdev Bhau: In Search of Silence	Dar Gai	Indian Hindi language film
2018	Sui Dhaaga	Sharat Katariya	Indian Hindi language film
2018	Forgive Us Our Debts	Antonio Morabito	
2018	The Man Who Bought the Moon	Paolo Zucca	
2019	Copperman	Eros Puglielli	
2021	The Catholic School	Stefano Mordini	
2021	Django & Django	Luca Rea	
2023	Nuovo Olimpo	Ferzan Özpetek	
2024	Romeo Is Juliet	Giovanni Veronesi	

== Awards and nominations ==
- Venice Film Festival 2017 - Soundtrack Stars Award
- European Film Awards 2005 - Best Composer (Hotel Rwanda)
- Golden Satellite Awards 2005 - Best Original Song ("Million Voices", from the movie Hotel Rwanda, written by Andrea Guerra, Wyclef Jean and Jerry 'Wonder' Duplessis)
- Apex Award 2005 - Best Original Song ("Million Voices")
- Ravello CineMusic 2004 - Best Original Song ("Che ne sarà di noi")
- David di Donatello Awards 2003 - Best Composer (Facing Windows)
- Globo d'oro 2003 - Best Soundtrack (Facing Windows)
- Ciak d'oro 2003 - Best Soundtrack (Facing Windows)
- Silver Ribbon 2003 - Best Song ("Gocce di memoria")
- Italian Music Award 2003 - Best Song ("Gocce di memoria")
- Italian Music Award 2003 - Best Arrangement ("Gocce di memoria")
- Nino Rota Prize 2003 for the artistic quality of works
- FIPA (International Festival of Audiovisual Programs) d'Or Biarritz 2003 - Best Soundtrack (La guerra è finita)
- Flaiano Film Festival 2001 - Best Soundtrack (Le fate ignoranti)
- Italian Music Award 2001 - Best Soundtrack (Le fate ignoranti)
- Grolla d'oro 2001 - best composer (Tornando a casa)
- Film Festival in Valencia 2001 - Best Soundtrack (Tornando a casa)

=== Nominations ===
- David di Donatello Awards 2008 - Best Original Song ("Tear Down These Houses")
- Grammy Awards 2005 - Best Song from the film ("Million Voices")
- Golden Globe 2005 - Best Original Song ("Million Voices")
- David di Donatello Awards 2005 - Best Soundtrack (Cuore sacro)
- David di Donatello Awards 2004 - Best Soundtrack (Che ne sarà di noi)
- Globo d'oro 2003 - Best Soundtrack (Prendimi l'anima)
