= Bebo Storti =

Italian actor and comedian

- Born: Alberto Storti; 24 May 1956 (age 70); Milan, Italy
- Occupations: Actor; comedian; writer

Alberto "Bebo" Storti (born 24 May 1956) is an Italian actor, comedian and writer, whose career spanned over 40 years.

== Life and career ==
Born in Milan, after several years spent in minor stage companies, Storti became first known in 1985, thanks to the Gabriele Salvatores' comedy play Comedians. In the following years he became a member of Salvatores' Teatro dell'Elfo, and made his film debut in Salvatores' Kamikazen: Last Night in Milan. Between the late 1980s and the early 1990s he worked with Paolo Rossi in several stage plays, and in 1992, he made his television debut in Rossi's sketch comedy show Su la testa.

In 1996, Storti had his breakout thanks to the participation in the Gialappa's Band's variety show Mai dire Gol, in which he played Alfio Muschio, a comic caricature of a devoted black Lega Nord supporter, and his most famous character, Count Uguccione, a frivolous playboy aristocrat and Fiorentina fan. The same year, dressed as Alfio Muschio and thanks to the collaboration of skier Lamine Guèye, he took part in the parade with Senegal at the opening ceremony of the Alpine World Ski Championships. In the following years, he intensified his film career, and also appeared on stage in serious roles. He wrote several humorous novels featuring Uguccione.

== Selected filmography ==
Film
Year	Title	Role	Notes
1988	Kamikazen: Last Night in Milan	Gino Venturi	Film debut
1997	Nirvana	Meditating man	
1999	In the Beginning There Was Underwear	Michele	
1999	All the Moron's Men	Cleaner	
2002	Amnèsia	Ernesto	
2005	Quo Vadis, Baby?	Lattice	
2005	The Bodyguard's Cure	Gipi	
2006	Our Country	Glauco Bottini	
2008	We Can Do That	Padella	
2012	Vacanze di Natale a Cortina	Minister	
2012	Ti stimo fratello	Roberto Ricci	
2013	Cha cha cha	Massa	
2013	Wannabe Widowed	Pier	
2014	Human Capital	Inspector	
2014	Mafia and Red Tomatoes	Dario	
2015	I Killed Napoléon	Fanelli	
2016	What's the Big Deal	Ugo	
2016	Poveri ma ricchi	Cook	
2018	A Woman's Name	Don Roberto Ferrari	
2019	The Traitor	Franco Coppi	
2020	Guests in the Villa	Dr. De Santis	
2023	A Hundred Sundays	Maurizio	
2026	No Place to Be Single	Dr. Galli	
2026	Il malloppo	Veleno	
