= Three Men and a Leg =

- Directed by: Aldo, Giovanni & Giacomo; Massimo Venier
- Written by: Aldo, Giovanni & Giacomo; Massimo Venier; Giorgio Gherarducci; Lucio Martignoni
- Produced by: Paolo Guerra
- Starring: Aldo, Giovanni & Giacomo
- Cinematography: Giovanni Fiore Coltellacci
- Edited by: Marco Spoletini
- Music by: Marco Forni; Phil Palmer
- Release date: 1997
- Running time: 98 min
- Language: Italian

Three Men and a Leg (Italian: Tre uomini e una gamba) is a 1997 Italian road film and romantic comedy co-written and co-directed by the comedy trio Aldo, Giovanni & Giacomo and by Massimo Venier.

== Plot ==
Aldo, Giovanni, and Giacomo are three friends nearing forty, each unhappy with his dull life. In the middle of a scorching Milan summer, they drive to Gallipoli for Giacomo's wedding to the daughter of Eros Cecconi, their overbearing boss and already the father-in-law of the other two. They also have to deliver a wooden leg sculpture Cecconi has purchased, and they travel with his bulldog, Ringhio.

During the trip, they accidentally kill the dog and clumsily try to hide it. After being rear-ended by Chiara, a young woman headed to Greece, the four of them travel together in search of a mechanic. When Giacomo falls ill, they are forced to delay their arrival, provoking Cecconi's anger and prompting Aldo and Giovanni to question their stagnant lives.

More mishaps follow: the car breaks down again, Aldo replaces Ringhio with a stray dog, and the wooden leg is lost in a river and recovered by Moroccan builders using it as a soccer goalpost. After losing it in a match and failing to steal it back, the friends regain the sculpture thanks to the generosity of its owner. Along the way, Giacomo falls for Chiara, though she ultimately leaves them to continue her trip alone.

When the three finally reach Gallipoli, the chaotic journey has changed them. Facing Cecconi, Giacomo calls off the wedding, and the friends flee together, ready to start a new life.

== Cast ==
- Aldo Baglio as Aldo Baglio / Al / Ajeje Brazorf / Dracula
- Giovanni Storti as Giovanni Storti / John / Tram Controller / Gino
- Giacomo Poretti as Giacomino Poretti / Jack / Tram Passenger / Michele
- Marina Massironi as Chiara / Giusy
- Carlo Croccolo as Eros Cecconi
- Luciana Littizzetto as Giuliana Cecconi
- Maria Pia Casilio as Miss Cecconi
- Augusto Zucchi as The Doctor
- Mohamed El Sayed as The Moroccan Engineer
- Rosalina Neri as Aldo's Neighbour

== Accolades ==
Year	Award	Category	Recipient(s)	Result	Ref.
1998	David di Donatello	Best New Director	Aldo, Giovanni & Giacomo and Massimo Venier	Nominated	
1998	Nastro d'Argento	Special Nastro d'Argento	Aldo, Giovanni & Giacomo	Won	

== See also ==
- List of Italian films of 1997
