= Giacomo Poretti =

Italian actor and comedian (born 1956)

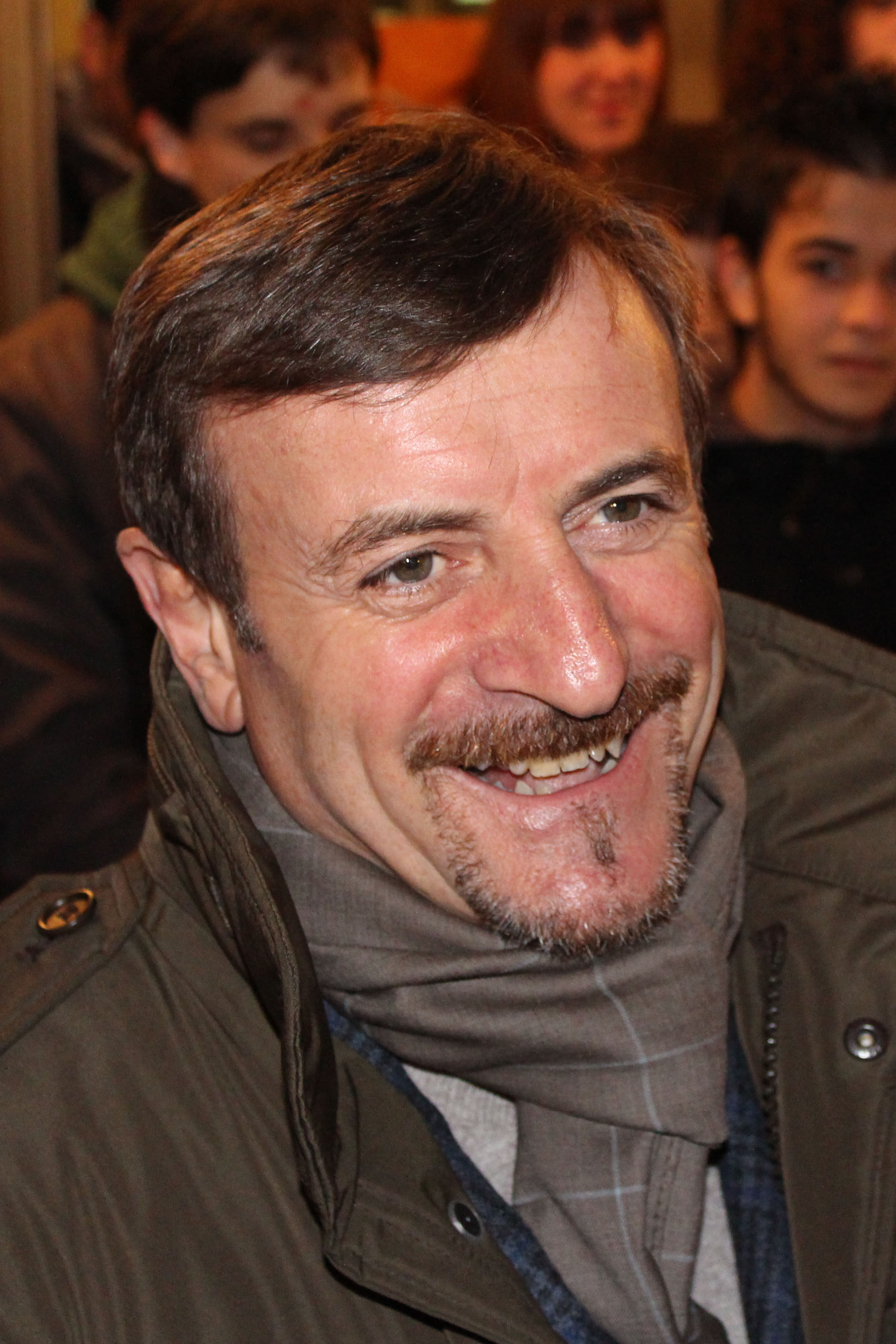
- Poretti in 2012
- Born: Giacomino Poretti; 26 April 1956 (age 70); Villa Cortese, then part of Busto Garolfo, Province of Milan, Italy
- Occupations: Actor; comedian; film director; screenwriter
- Years active: 1983–present
- Spouses: Marina Massironi (m. 1986; div. 1990); Daniela Cristofori
- Children: 1

Giacomino "Giacomo" Poretti (Italian: [ˈdʒaːkomo poˈretti]; born 26 April 1956) is an Italian actor, comedian, film director, and screenwriter, best known as a member of the comedy trio Aldo, Giovanni e Giacomo.

== Life and career ==
Poretti was born in Villa Cortese, then a frazione of Busto Garolfo, into a working-class family. From a young age, he developed a passion for theater and tried to join the popular "I Legnanesi" company, but without success. He abandoned his studies to become a surveyor and worked as a metalworker and nurse at the hospital in Legnano, also dedicating himself to cabaret and politics with Proletarian Democracy.

In 1983, Poretti graduated from the theatrical school in Busto Arsizio and made his stage debut. Together with his girlfriend Marina Massironi, he formed the cabaret duo "Hansel e Strüdel". In 1985, he left his hospital job and worked as a summer camp director in Sardinia, where he met Aldo Baglio and Giovanni Storti. They founded the comedy trio "Aldo, Giovanni e Giacomo" in 1991.

The trio achieved great success in Italy, initially through theater performances and appearances on national TV shows. Poretti became extremely popular for the character Tafazzi, created together with Carlo Turati for some performances at the end of the 1980s, and portrayed on Mai dire Gol starting in 1995. The name "Tafazzi" entered common language, with the words "tafazzista" or "tafazzismo", as a reference for the quintessential masochistic behavior of the character. In 1996, it was also the name given to a newly discovered protein, tafazzin.

In the late-1990s and early 2000s, the trio released a series of hit films that broke box office records, including Three Men and a Leg (1997), That's Life (1998), Ask Me If I'm Happy (2000), and The Legend of Al, John and Jack (2002).

In the 2010s, Poretti began collaborating with La Stampa as a columnist. In 2013, his autobiography Alto come un vaso di gerani was published, followed in 2015 by his first novel, Al paradiso è meglio credere. In 2018 Poretti debuted as a television host with the program Scarp de' tenis and staged successful theatrical shows. Since 2019, he has been directing the Teatro Oscar in Milan.

In 2022, he created the podcast PoretCast, hosting various public figures.

== Personal life ==
Poretti was married to Marina Massironi from 1986 to 1990, and he is currently married to Daniela Cristofori. Poretti and Cristofori have a son named Emanuele, born in 2006.

== Filmography ==
Film
Year	Title	Role	Notes
1987	Un paradiso senza biliardo	The Milanese	Film debut
1997	Three Men and a Leg	Giacomo	Also co-director and writer
1998	That's Life	Giacomo	Also co-director and writer
1999	All the Moron's Men	Mamoto	
2000	Ask Me If I'm Happy	Giacomo	Also co-director and writer
2002	The Legend of Al, John and Jack	Jack La Paglia	Also co-director and writer
2004	Do You Know Claudia?	Giacomo	Also writer
2008	Il cosmo sul comò	Various	Also writer
2010	The Santa Claus Gang	Dr. Giacomo Poretti	Also writer
2013	Ci vuole un gran fisico	Client	Cameo role
2014	The Rich, the Pauper and the Butler	Dr. Giacomo Poretti	Also co-director and writer
2016	Fuga da Reuma Park	Giacomo	Also co-director and writer
2017	Let Yourself Go	Biraghi	
2020	I Hate Summer	Giacomo	Also writer
2022	The Wedding Days	Giacomo	Also writer
2023	Zamora	De Carli	

Television
Year	Title	Role	Notes
1987	Professione vacanze	Attilio	TV series; 2 episodes
1988	Don Tonino	Waiter	TV series; episode 1x06
2022	Doc – Nelle tue mani	Giacomo	TV series; episode 2x02
