= Giovanni Storti =

Italian actor and comedian (born 1957)

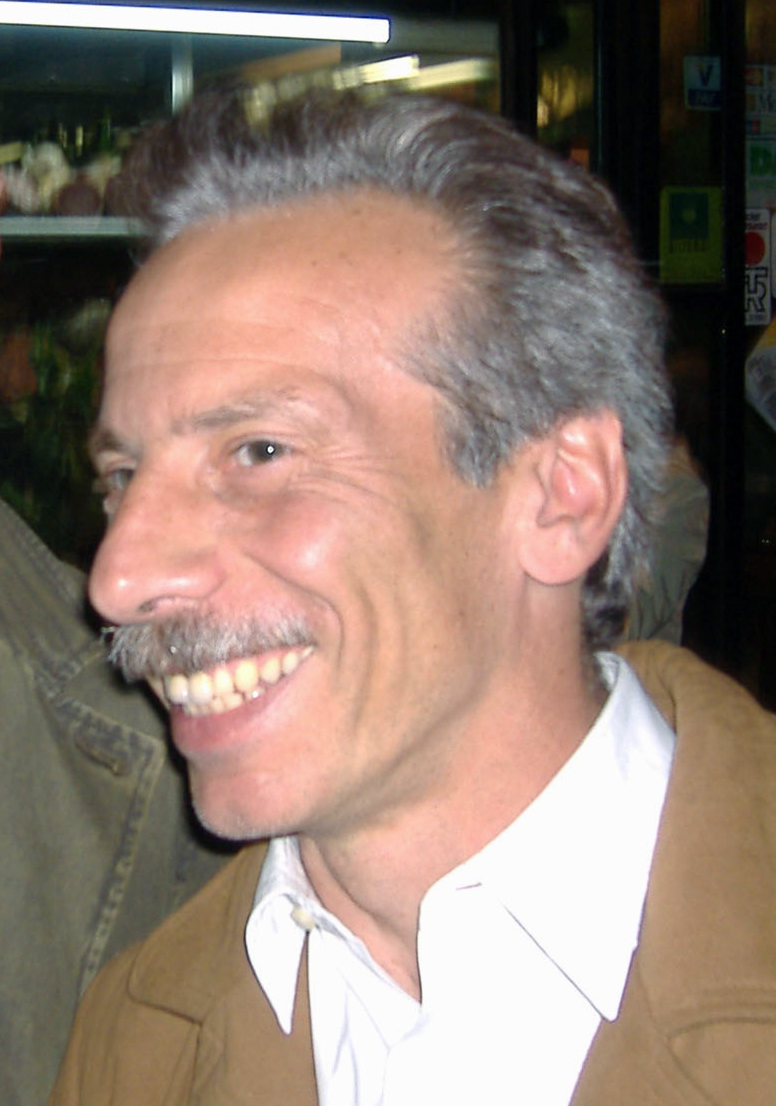
- Storti in 2007
- Born: 20 February 1957 (age 69); Milan, Italy
- Occupations: Actor; comedian; film director; writer
- Years active: 1978–present
- Spouse: Annita Casolo
- Children: 2

Giovanni Storti (Italian: [dʒoˈvanni ˈstɔrti]; born 20 February 1957) is an Italian actor, comedian, film director, and writer, best known as a member of the comedy trio Aldo, Giovanni e Giacomo.

== Life and career ==
Born in Milan in 1957, Storti graduated at the mime-drama school at the Teatro Arsenale in 1978. He started a comedy career with Aldo Baglio, forming a duo that lasted about ten years. During this period, they appeared in television roles and met Giacomo Poretti, with whom they founded the trio "Aldo, Giovanni e Giacomo" in 1991. The trio achieved great success in Italy, initially through theater performances and appearances on TV shows such as those hosted by the Gialappa's Band, then with a series of hit films that broke box office records, including Three Men and a Leg (1997), That's Life (1998), Ask Me If I'm Happy (2000), and The Legend of Al, John and Jack (2002).

In the 2010s, he published three books with Mondadori: Corro perché mia mamma mi picchia (2013), Una seducente sospensione del buon senso (2015), and Niente panico, si continua a correre (2018).

In 2021, Storti starred in the film Boys, his first solo project without Aldo and Giacomo. In 2022, he starred as the lead in Everyone on Board by Luca Miniero, and had his first drama role in Lonely Voices by Andrea Brusa and Marco Scotuzzi. The following year, he appeared in various productions, including The Worst Days by Massimiliano Bruno and Edoardo Leo, as well as Santocielo with Ficarra e Picone.

== Personal life ==
He is married to Annita Casolo, with whom he has two daughters, Clara and Mara. He is a marathon runner and has participated in various competitions. He also practices tai chi.

== Filmography ==
Film
Year	Title	Role	Notes
1987	Kamikazen: Last Night in Milan	Police officer	Film debut
1997	Three Men and a Leg	Giovanni	Also co-director and writer
1998	That's Life	Giovanni	Also co-director and writer
1999	All the Moron's Men	Pocoto	
2000	Ask Me If I'm Happy	Giovanni	Also co-director and writer
2002	The Legend of Al, John and Jack	John La Paglia	Also co-director and writer
2004	Do You Know Claudia?	Giovanni	Also writer
2008	Il cosmo sul comò	Various	Also writer
2010	The Santa Claus Gang	Dr. Giovanni Storti	Also writer
2013	Ci vuole un gran fisico	Guardian angel	Cameo role
2014	The Rich, the Pauper and the Butler	Giovanni	Also co-director and writer
2016	Fuga da Reuma Park	Giovanni	Also co-director and writer
2020	I Hate Summer	Giovanni	Also writer
2021	Boys	Carlo	
2022	Everyone on Board	Claudio	
2022	Lonely Voices	Giovanni	
2022	The Wedding Days	Giovanni	Also writer
2023	The Worst Days	Gildo Falchetti	
2023	Santocielo	God	
2023	Zamora	Tosetto	

== Books ==
- Storti, Giovanni; Rossi, Franz (2013). Corro perché mia mamma mi picchia. Milan: Mondadori.
- Storti, Giovanni; Rossi, Franz (2015). Una seducente sospensione del buon senso. Milan: Mondadori.
- Storti, Giovanni; Rossi, Franz (2018). Niente panico, si continua a correre. Milan: Mondadori.
