= 45th David di Donatello =

2000 Italian film awards

- Date: 19 April 2000
- Site: Cinecittà, Rome
- Hosted by: Carlo Conti

Highlights
- Best Picture: Bread and Tulips
- Most awards: Bread and Tulips (9)
- Most nominations: Bread and Tulips (9)

Television coverage
- Network: Rai 1

The 45th David di Donatello ceremony, presented by the Accademia del Cinema Italiano, was held on 19 April 2000.

== Winners and nominees ==
| Best Film: Bread and Tulips, directed by Silvio Soldini; Canone inverso - Making Love, directed by Ricky Tognazzi; Olympic Garage, directed by Marco Bechis | Best Producer: Amedeo Pagani – Olympic Garage; Vittorio Cecchi Gori – Canone inverso - Making Love; Domenico Procacci – But Forever in My Mind |
| Best Director: Silvio Soldini – Bread and Tulips; Marco Bechis – Olympic Garage; Ricky Tognazzi – Canone inverso - Making Love | Best New Director: Alessandro Piva – LaCapaGira; Andrea and Antonio Frazzi – The Sky Will Fall; Piergiorgio Gay, Roberto San Pietro – Tre storie |
| Best Actor: Bruno Ganz – Bread and Tulips; Stefano Accorsi – Outlaw; Fabrizio Gifuni – A Love; Carlo Verdone – A Chinese in a Coma | Best Actress: Licia Maglietta – Bread and Tulips; Lorenza Indovina – A Love; Francesca Neri – The Sweet Sounds of Life; Francesca Neri – Io amo Andrea; Isabella Rossellini – The Sky Will Fall |
| Best Supporting Actor: Giuseppe Battiston – Bread and Tulips (ex aequo); Leo Gullotta – A Respectable Man (ex aequo); Emilio Solfrizzi – Outlaw | Best Supporting Actress: Marina Massironi – Bread and Tulips; Rosalinda Celentano – The Sweet Sounds of Life; Anna Galiena – But Forever in My Mind |
| David di Donatello for Best Screenplay: Doriana Leondeff, Silvio Soldini – Bread and Tulips; Marco Bechis, Lara Fremder – Olympic Garage; Simona Izzo, Ricky Tognazzi – Canone inverso - Making Love | Best Cinematography: Luca Bigazzi – Bread and Tulips (ex aequo); Fabio Cianchetti – Canone inverso - Making Love (ex aequo); Giuseppe Lanci – The Nanny |
| Best Production Design: Francesco Bronzi – Canone inverso - Making Love; Marco Dentici – The Nanny; Antonello Geleng, Marina Pinzuti – Amor nello specchio | Best Score: Ennio Morricone – Canone inverso - Making Love; Paolo Buonvino – But Forever in My Mind; Pivio and Aldo De Scalzi – Outlaw |
| Best Editing: Carla Simoncelli – Canone inverso - Making Love; Jacopo Quadri – Olympic Garage; Cecilia Zanuso – Outlaw | Best Sound: Maurizio Argentieri – Bread and Tulips; Tullio Morganti – The Sweet Sounds of Life; Bruno Pupparo – But Forever in My Mind |
| Best Costumes: Sergio Ballo – The Nanny; Alfonsina Lettieri – Canone inverso - Making Love; Lucia Mirisola – La Carbonara | Best Short Film: Monna Lisa, directed by Matteo Delbò |
| Best Foreign Film: All About My Mother, directed by Pedro Almodóvar; American Beauty, directed by Sam Mendes; East Is East, directed by Damien O'Donnell | David Scuola: Canone inverso - Making Love, directed by Ricky Tognazzi |
| Golden Plaques: Mariangela Melato; Giancarlo Giannini; Giorgio Armani; Alessandro von Normann; U.N.I.T.E.C. Unione Nazionale Industrie Tecniche Cineaudiovisive | Special David Awards: Massimo Boldi and Christian De Sica; Leonardo Pieraccioni; Vittorio Cecchi Gori |
