= Tafazzi =

- Mai dire Gol character
- Created by: Carlo Turati
- Portrayed by: Giacomo Poretti

In-universe information
- Gender: Male
- Nationality: Italian

Tafazzi is an Italian comic character created by Carlo Turati and portrayed by Giacomo Poretti, member of the group Aldo, Giovanni e Giacomo. It originally appeared in 1995 on Mai dire Gol, a comic-sports television show by the Gialappa's Band, but later appeared in other works of Aldo, Giovanni e Giacomo, including the theatre show I corti.

Tafazzi is a sort of mime wearing a black tracksuit and a jockstrap, who does nothing but beat his groin with a plastic bottle while wearing a jockstrap.

The character is the source of the name of the protein Tafazzin, due to the difficulties involved in identifying the tafazzin gene.

== See also ==
- Aldo, Giovanni e Giacomo
