= Grandi domani =

- Genre: Drama
- Created by: Maria De Filippi; Maurizio Costanzo
- Starring: Marco Giallini; Fathy El Gharbawy; Irene Ferri; Francesco Paolantoni; Giovanni Esposito
- Country of origin: Italy
- No. of seasons: 1
- No. of episodes: 24

Original release
- Network: Italia 1
- Release: January 23 – April 3, 2005

Grandi domani is an Italian television series.

== See also ==
- List of Italian television series
