= Scappo a casa =

- Theatrical release poster
- Directed by: Enrico Lando
- Written by: Morgan Bertacca; Valerio Bariletti; Aldo Baglio
- Produced by: Paolo Guerra
- Starring: Aldo Baglio; Jacky Ido; Fatou N'Diaye; Angela Finocchiaro; Hassani Shapi
- Cinematography: Massimo Schiavon
- Edited by: Luigi Mearelli
- Music by: Fabrizio Mancinelli
- Distributed by: Medusa Film
- Release date: 21 March 2019
- Running time: 92 minutes
- Country: Italy
- Language: Italian
- Box office: $1,243,388

Scappo a casa (lit. 'I flee home') is a 2019 Italian comedy film directed by Enrico Lando.

== Cast ==
- Aldo Baglio as Michele
- Jacky Ido as Mugambi
- Fatou N'Diaye as Babelle
- Angela Finocchiaro as Ursula
- Hassani Shapi as Umar
- Giovanni Esposito as the pharmacist
- Rocco Barbaro as Pasquale
- Dino Longo as Seidovic
- Mario Pupella as Pavelic
- Lana Vladi as Agota
- Awa Ly as Jamilah
- Thierno Thiam as Jamilah's husband
- Betani Mapunzo as Jamba
- Benjamin Stender as Bojan
- Emmanuel Dabone as Abbah
- Jonathan Guerrero as Felipe / Mrs. Wang
