= Maurizio Crozza =

Italian comedian (born 1959)

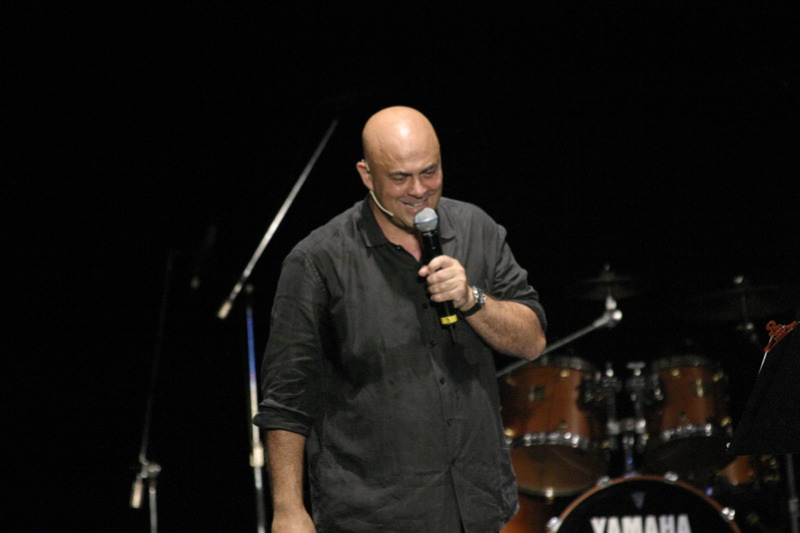
- Crozza in 2007
- Born: 5 December 1959 (age 66); Genoa, Italy
- Occupations: Comedian; actor; television presenter
- Height: 175 cm (5 ft 9 in)
- Spouse: Carla Signoris
- Children: 2

Comedy career
- Years active: 1995–present
- Medium: Stand-up; television
- Genres: Political satire; stand-up comedy; impression; character comedy (rarely); observational comedy (rarely)
- Subjects: Italian politics; current events; pop culture

Maurizio Crozza (Italian: [mauˈrittsjo ˈkrɔttsa]; born 5 December 1959) is an Italian stand-up comedian, actor and television presenter.

== Biography ==
Crozza was born in Genoa, Italy. He attended an acting school in the same city, where he graduated in 1980.

Crozza has worked for many years with the Gialappa's Band trio on Mediaset and in the Sunday show Quelli che... il Calcio on Rai. He has also starred in a number of films, including the 1995 movie Peggio di così si muore by Marcello Cesena. Over his career, Crozza has received both praise and criticism from Italian commentators: he was notably criticised over his satire on Pope Benedict XVI in 2006 and about Silvio Berlusconi at the 2013 Sanremo Music Festival.

After hosting his own show on the network channel La7 for many years, in 2017 he moved the same show to Nove.

== Filmography ==
=== Film ===
Year	Title	Role(s)	Notes
1992	L'angolo con la pistola	Andrea Marcos	
1995	Peggio di così si muore	Carlo	
1997	Commercial Break	Bonelli	
1999	All the Moron's Men	Leone Stella	
2000	Treasure Planet	B.E.N.	Italian voice
2011	Soltanto uno scherzo	Gherardo	Short film

=== Television ===
Year	Title	Role(s)	Notes
1989	Der lange Sommer	Bernardo	Television film
1991–1993	Avanzi	Himself / Cast member	Satirical program
1993	Ci sarà il giorno	Pertini	Television film
1994	Tunnel	Himself / Cast member	Satirical program
1996	Hollywood Party	Himself / Host	Variety show
1997	Mamma per caso	Carlo	4 episodes
1997	Nei secoli dei secoli	Marinetti	Television film
1997	Tutti gli uomini sono uguali	Martino	7 episodes
1998–2001	Mai dire Gol	Himself / Cast member	Variety show (season 9–11)
2001–2004	Quelli che... il Calcio	Himself / Cast member	Variety show (season 9–12)
2004	Sanremo Music Festival 2004	Himself / Co-host	Annual music festival
2006–2009	Crozza Italia	Himself / Host	Satirical program
2012–2016	Crozza nel Paese delle Meraviglie	Himself / Host	Satirical program
2017–present	Fratelli di Crozza	Himself / Host	Satirical program
2017	Sanremo Music Festival 2017	Himself / Co-host	Annual music festival
