= Giovanni Esposito (comedian) =

Italian actor (born 1970)

- Born: 14 June 1970 (age 55); Naples, Italy
- Occupation: Actor
- Years active: 1991–present
- Height: 1.70 m (5 ft 7 in)

Giovanni Esposito (born 14 June 1970) is an Italian actor, comedian, and cabaret artist. He works in theater, cinema, and television.

== Biography ==
Esposito was born in Naples and studied acting there. From 1993 to 1995, he attended the Academy of Dramatic Art at the Teatro Bellini in Naples. From 1991, he was seen in various TV productions on Italian television, including small roles on the Pippo Chennedy Show, Mai dire..., as well as with Gialappa's Band. National and international projects followed, including supporting roles in Florian Henckel von Donnersmarck's 2010 film The Tourist and Tomy Wigand's comedy Omamamia (2012). In 2009, Esposito made the short film Bisesto, which was nominated for a David di Donatello for Best Short Film award.

== Selected filmography ==
Film
Year	Title	Role	Notes
1998	The Dust of Naples	Mimmo	
1999	Outlaw	Di Gennaro	
1999	All the Moron's Men	Don Leone	
2000	Johnny the Partisan	southern partisan	
2001	Bimba - È clonata una stella	Emilio	
2002	The Legend of Al, John and Jack	Frank Contropelo	
2003	Instructing the Heart	Gaetano	
2004	The Remains of Nothing	monk	
2010	The Tourist	interpreter Coppa	
2010	The Santa Claus Gang	Benemerita	
2011	It May Be Love But It Doesn't Show	Orazio/Arturo	
2011	Mozzarella Stories	Gigino Purpetta	
2012	To Rome with Love		
2013	A Small Southern Enterprise	Raffaele	
2014	Mafia and Red Tomatoes	Frullo	
2014	The Rich, the Pauper and the Butler	Policeman	
2015	Si accettano miracoli	Vittorio	
2015	Natale col Boss	Mamma Santissima's Nephew	
2016	Non c'è più religione	Bishop's secretary	
2018	Loro	Mariano Apicella	
2019	Scappo a casa	Pharmacist	
2019	The Most Beautiful Day in the World	Gianni Pochi Pochi	
2021	I fratelli De Filippo	Capece	
2025	Jay Kelly	Antonio	

Television
Year	Title	Role	Notes
1996	Un posto al sole		
1997	La piovra	Favignana's henchman	8th season
2000	Giornalisti	Antonio Panizza	
2005	Grandi domani	Matteo	
2010	I delitti del cuoco	Antonio	
