= The Legend of Al, John and Jack =

2002 crime comedy film

- Theatrical release poster
- Italian: La leggenda di Al, John e Jack
- Directed by: Aldo, Giovanni & Giacomo; Massimo Venier
- Written by: Aldo, Giovanni & Giacomo; Massimo Venier; Paolo Cananzi; Walter Fontana
- Produced by: Paolo Guerra
- Starring: Aldo Baglio; Giovanni Storti; Giacomo Poretti
- Cinematography: Arnaldo Catinari
- Music by: Andrea Guerra
- Distributed by: Medusa Film
- Release date: 13 December 2002
- Running time: 105 minutes
- Country: Italy
- Language: Italian

The Legend of Al, John and Jack (Italian: La leggenda di Al, John e Jack) is a 2002 crime comedy film directed by Aldo, Giovanni & Giacomo and Massimo Venier.

== Plot ==
The story is set in New York City in 1959. Three gangsters, namely Al, John and Jack, who pretend to be watching a film in a drive-in theater, are in fact spying on Sam Genovese, the most wanted mob boss of the city. Genovese, nicknamed "chicken thigh" after his favourite food, plans to kill one of his men who betrayed him, and the three gangsters are there because they want to record the killing and send it to the FBI. But, when Genovese is about to pull the trigger, he chokes on his food. The traitor saves his life and is pardoned, and, while the gangsters are about to leave, Al is electrocuted by a cable and loses his memory.

Some days later, the gangsters–Al Caruso, nicknamed "Four-fingers", Johnny Gresko, also known as "Handsome Johnny", and Jack Amoruso, nicknamed "Not-everything-turns-out-as-it-should"–are in a hotel room; due to the electrocution Al got a rare syndrome which erases his memory every time he falls asleep. They tell him the whole story: four days before, it was Jack's birthday. Johnny got him a book about Caravaggio (who the little schooled Jack calls "Carabbaggio" due to his heavy Sicilian accent) and Al got him a new gun. They work for Genovese, but they are clumsy and unreliable: they recently killed an innocent barber, "Against-growth" Frankie, because they mistakenly thought he was "Rubber-ass" Frankie, a traitor who used to collaborate with the FBI. Also, whilst in a pub run by Genovese's gang, they start a shootout because Jack mistakes a gangster for "Little weasel" Frank, another gangster he thought was dissolved in acid.

Genovese gives them one last chance: they have to pick up his old aunt at the bus station and take her around town. But, as soon as they meet the old lady, Jack accidentally kills her, shooting with his new gun, which is defective. (According to Johnny, the gun shot because Jack "held the barrel up", something he already told him not to do seven times.)

The three run away and hide at Herbert's home; Herbert is Al's homosexual brother who will later turn out to be in love with Johnny. They make up a plan to betray Genovese and get him arrested by the FBI, using evidence of him killing the man at the drive-in, but the plan fails. So they make up a new one: they'll fake an attempt on Genovese's life and pretend to foil it: Al will hide in the wardrobe in Genovese's hotel room and wait for the room service to deliver him the meal; John and Jack will hide the gun in the tray. When the room service will enter the room, Al will jump out the wardrobe, pick the gun and kill the waiter, and then they'll explain the "attempt" and obtain Genovese's mercy.

By climbing the outer wall of the hotel, Al avoids the boss' bodyguards, "Hard Back" Tom and "Butterfingered" Sam, and gets into Genovese's room, but before the arrival of Genovese, he hears the news. A guy named Calogero Buccheri is missing. His most particular sign are the missing pinky on his left hand and a very rare syndrome which erases his memory every time he fells asleep. Al understands the truth: he is Calogero Buccheri. John and Jack, it turns out, are named La Paglia, and they are two scammers who planned to fake Buccheri's kidnapping and accuse Genovese of it, so they could obtain the reward. The two of them, along with some policemen, break into Genovese's room, but Al is no more in the wardrobe. He was planning to leave and return to his family, but he changed his mind and hid under the bed. They find him and Genovese gets arrested for kidnapping. Al forgives John and Jack and returns home.

Two years later, John and Jack are broke again. They spent all their money, but hear at the radio that Hurricane Hogan, a very famous boxeur, will pay $5,000 to the man who will beat him. Calogero Buccheri goes missing again.

== Cast ==
- Aldo Baglio as Al/Herbert
- Giovanni Storti as John
- Giacomo Poretti as Jack
- Aldo Maccione as Sam Genovese
- Antonio Catania as Fred
- Giovanni Esposito as Frank "Against-growth"
- Ivano Marescotti as Chief of police
- Paolo Dell'Orto as Null
- Marco Beretta as Ben
- Giovanni Cacioppo as Tom "Hard Back"
- Frank Crudele as Sam "Butterfingered"

== Accolades ==
Year	Award	Category	Recipient(s)	Result	Ref.
2003	Nastro d'Argento	Best Cinematography	Arnaldo Catinari	Nominated	
2003	Nastro d'Argento	Best Scenography	Eleonora Ponzoni	Nominated	
