= Kamikazen: Last Night in Milan =

- Directed by: Gabriele Salvatores
- Written by: Gabriele Salvatores; Enzo Monteleone
- Produced by: Maurizio Totti; Sandro Parenzo
- Starring: Paolo Rossi; Antonio Catania; Silvio Orlando
- Cinematography: Fernando Ciangola
- Music by: Fred Bongusto
- Release date: 1988
- Language: Italian

Kamikazen: Last Night in Milan (Italian: Kamikazen - Ultima notte a Milano) is a 1988 Italian comedy film written and directed by Gabriele Salvatores and starring Silvio Orlando, Paolo Rossi, Antonio Catania and Claudio Bisio.

== Plot ==
Six amateur and desperate comedians are called by their agent, just as amateur and desperate as them, for an event. To get the money back from a gambling loss, the agent invents a story that convinces the comedians to pay for acting. The idea is irresistible: among the public of the lousy nightclub where the show will take place, there will be a person in charge of Drive In, the most famous cabaret television show of the moment, looking for new talents to bring to the TV show business.

== Cast ==
- Paolo Rossi as Walter Zappa
- Silvio Orlando as Nicola Minichino
- Antonio Catania as Antonio Pesci
- Claudio Bisio as Vincenzo Amato
- Renato Sarti as Achille Carmi
- Bebo Storti as Gino Venturi
- Gigio Alberti as Bruno
- David Riondino as Davide
- Flavio Bonacci as Mario Corallo
- Laura Ferrari as Isabella
- Gianni Palladino as Santino
- Nanni Svampa as Colombo
- Mara Venier as Caterina De Lellis
- Maria Luisa Santella as Vittoria
- Diego Abatantuono as the man at the races
- Aldo Baglio as a customer at the restaurant
- Giovanni Storti as the Brigadiere
- Raul Cremona as a gangster

== See also ==
- List of Italian films of 1988
