= Cinzia Massironi =

Italian voice actress (born 1966)

- Born: 11 September 1966 (age 59); Legnano, Italy
- Occupations: Actress; voice actress
- Relatives: Marina Massironi (cousin)

Cinzia Massironi (born 11 September 1966) is an Italian voice actress.

== Career ==
Massironi dubbed many Italian animated characters in Italian (both female and male), such as Dan Kuso in Bakugan Battle Brawlers, Caska in Berserk, Daichi in Beyblade G-Revolution, Chun Lee in Beyblade: Metal Masters, Li Syaoran in Cardcaptor Sakura, Mitsuhiko Tsuburaya in Detective Conan, Comet in Princess Comet, Laura and Videl in Dragon Ball, Haku in Naruto, Clancy Kanuka in Patlabor: The TV Series and Lady Kale in Princess Gwenevere and the Jewel Riders.

In the field of video games, Massironi has dubbed Catwoman and Talia al Ghul in Batman: Arkham City, Lana Lei in Death by Degrees, Emily in Dishonored, Lachesis in God of War II, Hermione Granger in Harry Potter and the Deathly Hallows – Part 1, Michelle Chiang in Jet Li: Rise to Honor, female version of Commander Shepard in the Mass Effect series, Wonder Woman and Kitana in Mortal Kombat vs. DC Universe, Luke and Flora in the series Professor Layton, Talwyn Apogee in Ratchet & Clank Future: Tools of Destruction, Ingrid Hunnigan in Resident Evil 6, Lily in Vampire: The Masquerade – Redemption, and others.

Among the live-action roles that Massironi dubbed in Italian are these of Rebecca De Mornay in the miniseries The Shining and Alex Murrel in Laguna Beach: The Real Orange County. Massironi is also a stage actress, and has worked with the Italian comedy trio Aldo, Giovanni e Giacomo participating in the film Ask Me If I'm Happy (Italian: Chiedimi se sono felice) in the role of Francesca in 2000 and starred in the first part of the episodic film Il cosmo sul comò in 2008.

== Voice work ==
- Robin Hood - Video game (2003) - Lady Marian, Little John
- Anna's Tales - Animated series (2004) - Aldo
- Monster Allergy - Animated series (2005) - Lardine
- Foot 2 Rue - Animated series (2005-2009) - Gianni and Gionni Finezza, Samira
- PopPixie - Animated series (2011) - Pam
