= I Hate Summer =

2020 film by Massimo Venier

- Italian: Odio l'estate
- Directed by: Massimo Venier
- Written by: Aldo, Giovanni & Giacomo; Massimo Venier; Davide Lantieri; Michele Pellegrini
- Produced by: Paolo Guerra
- Starring: Aldo Baglio; Giovanni Storti; Giacomo Poretti; Lucia Mascino; Carlotta Natoli; Maria Di Biase
- Cinematography: Vittorio Omodei Zorini
- Music by: Brunori Sas
- Distributed by: Medusa Film
- Release date: 30 January 2020
- Running time: 105 minutes
- Country: Italy
- Language: Italian

I Hate Summer (Italian: Odio l'estate) is a 2020 Italian comedy film directed by Massimo Venier and starring Aldo, Giovanni & Giacomo.

Released about a month before the outbreak of the COVID-19 pandemic in Italy, the film is the tenth film of the popular comic trio; earning more than 7 million euros, it was the third highest grossing film of 2020 in Italy.

== Plot ==
Aldo, Giovanni, and Giacomo are three very different fathers from Milan. Aldo is a seemingly lazy hypochondriac who is always on sick leave, married to the endlessly patient Carmen, and father to three children. Giovanni is a meticulous and irritating perfectionist, married to Paola, with a teenage daughter, Alessia; he runs a failing family-owned shoe-accessory shop. Giacomo is a work-obsessed dentist, married to the anxious and overprotective Barbara, and stepfather to twelve-year-old Ludovico, who often withdraws into video games.

The three families, who do not know each other, travel to a southern Italian island for their summer holidays, only to discover that they accidentally rented the same house. The local carabiniere advises them to share the home rather than start a bureaucratic battle. When the agency later offers an alternative, Salvo—Aldo's son, infatuated with Alessia—rejects it without telling anyone.

As the vacation unfolds, each family's hidden problems surface. Giacomo is secretly coping with a lawsuit he has just lost after injuring a patient. Giovanni has decided to close his shop without informing his family and disapproves of Alessia's relationship with Salvo. Aldo, who seems carefree, is under pressure from Carmen, who fears he is hiding something from her.

Forced to live together, the three men gradually bond. After searching for Aldo's lost dog and later chasing after Ludovico, who has run away to meet a pen pal in Follonica, they begin to support one another. In Follonica, Giacomo reconciles with Ludovico, who decides to stay a bit longer with his pen pal's family.

Meanwhile, their wives also grow close, and even indulge in carefree antics, while Salvo and Alessia's relationship deepens. During the return trip, the men stop in Santa Marinella for a Massimo Ranieri concert. Thanks to an old favor, Giacomo gets Aldo onstage to sing with his idol, fulfilling Aldo's lifelong dream.

On the way back, Aldo falls ill and is hospitalized. His secret is finally revealed: he has a terminal disease and wanted to spend his remaining months in joy and normality. In the end, back on the island, the three families—now united—watch the summer fireworks together. Aldo's voice-over concludes that he hates summer, but only when it ends.

== Production ==
The shooting of the film took place from 17 June to 10 August 2019 between Apulia, Lombardy and Tuscany, in particular in Milan, Follonica, Giglio island, Mola di Bari, Lecce, Otranto, Ugento, and other places. The concert scene was shot in Terlizzi in Piazza Cavour, during a concert actually held by Massimo Ranieri in the period of the Festa Maggiore, on 6 August 2019.

== Cast ==
- Aldo Baglio as Aldo
- Giovanni Storti as Giovanni
- Giacomo Poretti as Giacomo
- Lucia Mascino as Barbara
- Carlotta Natoli as Paola
- Maria Di Biase as Carmen
- Roberto Citran as Rudi Contrada
- Massimo Ranieri as himself
- Michele Placido as the Marshal of Carabinieri
- Sabrina Martina as Alessia
- Davide Calgaro as Salvo
- Edoardo Vaino as Ludovico
- Ilary Marzo as Ilary
- Melissa Marzo as Melissa
- Francesco Brandi as Gerolin
- Pietro Ragusa as Tuscan policeman
- Carlo De Ruggieri as Pirola
- Valeria Colombo as Sonia
- Millie Fortunato Asquini as Else
- Harald Ottesen Nødtvedt as Helmut

== Remake ==
A Spanish remake was released on 23 August 2024 in Spain.
