= Nirvana (1997 film) =

- Film poster
- Directed by: Gabriele Salvatores
- Written by: Gabriele Salvatores; Pino Cacucci; Gloria Corica
- Produced by: Vittorio Cecchi Gori; Maurizio Totti
- Starring: Christopher Lambert; Diego Abatantuono; Stefania Rocca; Emmanuelle Seigner; Gigio Alberti; Claudio Bisio; Silvio Orlando; Paolo Rossi; Sergio Rubini; Amanda Sandrelli
- Cinematography: Italo Petriccione
- Edited by: Massimo Fiocchi
- Music by: Federico De Robertis; Mauro Pagani
- Distributed by: Cecchi Gori Distribution
- Release date: 24 January 1997
- Running time: 111 minutes
- Country: Italy
- Language: Italian
- Box office: $10 million (Italy)

Nirvana is a 1997 Italian cyberpunk science fiction film directed by Gabriele Salvatores. The film stars Christopher Lambert, Diego Abatantuono, Sergio Rubini, and Stefania Rocca. It was screened out of competition at the 1997 Cannes Film Festival.

== Plot ==
The film tells the story of a virtual reality game designer, Jimi (Christopher Lambert), who discovers that the main character of his game, Solo (Diego Abatantuono), has achieved sentience due to an attack by a computer virus. Asked by his creation (who feels everything the character in the game feels, including multiple deaths) to eliminate its existence, Jimi sets out to erase the game from the server of his employer, Okasama Star, before it's commercially released on Christmas Day, and thus spare Solo further suffering.

Jimi has been depressed since his wife Lisa (Emmanuelle Seigner) left him. He decides to make his search for her a part of his quest to delete Solo and the game. Along the way he recruits Lisa's friend Joystick (Sergio Rubini) and tech wizard Naima (Stefania Rocca) to help him avoid suspicious representatives of Okasama Star, who employ increasingly forceful methods to stop him. By the end, Jimi hacks into one of the company's servers. This hack is in the world of virtual reality interpreted as encounters with persons from Jimi's life; the network defends itself by projecting virtual representations of people such as Jimi's father and Lisa. It tries to keep the hacker's mind in the loop of his own memories as it burns the hacker's brain. Jimi manages to pass through the network defence mechanism by freeing his mind, forgetting about life before or after, about bodily feelings, and entering a state of pure concentration where one focuses only on the target (in this case the server with the company's bank account). It is similar to meditation where one tries to concentrate on breathing; people who are able to do this are referred to as angels (they are invisible to the system, can go anywhere they want, and their possibilities are limitless) in the film. In the end, Jimi feels enlightened and at inner peace with himself. He successfully deletes Solo, comes to terms with Lisa's leaving him, and understands why things happened the way they did. He is in the state of Nirvana. Yet, during the film ending credits, a message flashes - "Naima is on line" - meaning the whole Nirvana intrigue was indeed a game within another game, that the player (the spectator) completed.

== Cast ==
- Christopher Lambert as Jimi Dini
- Sergio Rubini as Joystick
- Diego Abatantuono as Solo
- Stefania Rocca as Naima
- Emmanuelle Seigner as Lisa
- Amanda Sandrelli as Maria
- Claudio Bisio as Red Rover
- Gigio Alberti as Dr. Ratzenberger
- Antonio Catania as Paranoia Vendor
- Ugo Conti as Sicilian Tourist
- Leonardo Gajo as Gaz-Gaz
- Silvio Orlando as Indian Desk Clerk
- Paolo Rossi as Joker
- Baskaran Pillai as the Guru
- Bebo Storti as Meditating man
- Alessandro Creamona as a policeman

== Production ==
The director, Gabriele Salvatores, shot the film mainly in the disused Alfa Romeo assembly plant in Portello, Milan. The whole place was converted in this sci-fi set where many ethnic sides of the city are shown. From the Indian to the Japanese to the Chinese, the film moves around the dynamic and the futuristic realms that the future created.

== Release ==
Nirvana was released on 24 January 1997 in Italy on 112 screens and opened at number two at the Italian box office behind The Cyclone with a gross of $1.7 million for the weekend. It went on to gross $10 million Dimension Films picked up U.S. distribution rights in March 1997, and the film was dubbed in English and released in early 1998.

== Reception ==
Margaret Pomeranz of Special Broadcasting Service rated the film 2 out of 5 stars and stated that the film is too serious and not very fun. Alan Jones of RadioTimes rated it 4 out of 5 stars and wrote: "This stunning cyber-fantasy is rich in design and innovative ideas, and intellectually engages the mind while always remaining enjoyable on the purest pulp levels". Travis Mackenzie Hoover of Exclaim! stated the film is too derivative and has aged poorly. David Rooney of Variety called it "a visually impressive, existential sci-fi yarn" that is "shortchanged by a poorly structured story".
