= That's Life (1998 film) =

- Poster of the film
- Italian: Così è la vita
- Directed by: Aldo, Giovanni & Giacomo; Massimo Venier
- Written by: Aldo, Giovanni & Giacomo; Massimo Venier; Gino e Michele; Giorgio Gherarducci; Graziano Ferrari
- Produced by: Paolo Guerra
- Starring: Aldo Baglio; Giovanni Storti; Giacomo Poretti; Marina Massironi
- Cinematography: Giovanni Fiore Coltellacci
- Music by: Negrita
- Distributed by: Medusa Film
- Release date: 18 December 1998
- Running time: 108 min
- Country: Italy
- Language: Italian
- Box office: $30 million (Italy)

That's How Life Is (Italian: Così è la vita) is a 1998 Italian comedy film directed by Aldo, Giovanni & Giacomo and Massimo Venier.

== Plot ==
Aldo Baglio is currently in prison, charged with a counterfeiting crime, and shares his room with his fat cellmate Crapanzano; Giacomo Poretti is an upstanding police officer who dreams of becoming a writer and lives with her sister's family, whose members treat him like an unwanted guest; Giovanni Storti is a children's toy designer who lives with his wife, Elena, who doesn’t seem to love him as much as he does. One morning, Aldo needs to be escorted to the courthouse. The designated police officers are Giacomo and his colleague Antonio. However, Antonio leaves Giacomo alone, who goes to meet Elena instead, and the latter cheats on Giovanni. During the drive, Aldo accidentally finds a gun in a car drawer and decides to hijack the vehicle. In the meantime, Giovanni gets robbed of his car, and as Giacomo’s police car passes by, he tries to stop it to seek help from the policeman, but he ends up being taken hostage, too.

After a long and adventurous journey, the three are found by the police. After a long and dangerous chase, the car falls from a cliff, but somehow they miraculously manage to survive. Aldo, Giovanni and Giacomo then spend the night in an abandoned cemetery, where they meet Clara, a woman Aldo falls in love with. The three hitchhike back to Milan, where, after seeing their corpses in three caskets, and thanks to Clara, they realise they actually died in the car crash. Giovanni finds out that his newly widowed wife has always had an unfaithful relationship with Antonio, while Giacomo discovers that his room has already been rented out and all his possessions, including the book he had been working on for a long time, have been thrown away.

Clara reveals herself as an angel and, together with Aldo, helps the two take revenge before accompanying them to heaven.

== Cast ==
- Aldo Baglio as Aldo Baglio/Al
- Giovanni Storti as Giovanni Storti/John
- Giacomo Poretti as Giacomo Poretti/Jack
- Marina Massironi as Clara
- Antonio Catania as Catanìa
- Big Jimmy as Crapanzano
- Elena Giusti as Elena, Giovanni's wife
- Augusto Zucchi as Police Commissioner
- Carlina Torta as Giacomo's sister
- Francesco Pannofino as Giacomo's brother in law
- Fabio Biaggi as Giacomo's nephew
- Mohamed El Sayed as Gaber
- Cesare Gallarini as Carmine
- Fabrizio Amachree as Platone
- Giovanni Cacioppo as man with broken car
- Bobby Rhodes as Sheriff

== Box office ==
The film was the fourth highest grossing film of the year despite only being released during December. It went on to gross over $30 million in Italy.

== Accolades ==
| Year | Award | Category | Recipient(s) | Result | Ref. |
|---|---|---|---|---|---|
| 1999 | Nastro d'Argento | Best Original Song | Negrita | Nominated | |
