= The Rich, the Pauper and the Butler =

- Theatrical release poster
- Italian: Il ricco, il povero e il maggiordomo
- Directed by: Aldo, Giovanni & Giacomo; Morgan Bertacca
- Written by: Aldo, Giovanni & Giacomo; Morgan Bertacca; Valerio Bariletti; Pasquale Plastino
- Produced by: Paolo Guerra
- Starring: Aldo Baglio; Giovanni Storti; Giacomo Poretti
- Cinematography: Giovanni Fiore Coltellacci
- Music by: Marco Sabiu
- Distributed by: Medusa Film
- Release date: 11 December 2014
- Running time: 102 min
- Country: Italy
- Language: Italian

The Rich, the Pauper and the Butler (Italian: Il ricco, il povero e il maggiordomo) is a 2014 comedy film directed by Aldo, Giovanni & Giacomo and Morgan Bertacca.

== Cast ==
- Aldo Baglio as Aldo
- Giovanni Storti as Giovanni
- Giacomo Poretti as Giacomo
- Giuliana Lojodice as Calcedonia Randone
- Francesca Neri as Assia
- Sara D'Amario as Camilla
- Massimo Popolizio as Father Amerigo
- Rosalia Porcaro as Samantha
- Guadalupe Lancho as Dolores
- Giovanni Esposito as policeman at the airport
- Chiara Sani as Luana
