= Do You Know Claudia? =

2004 film by Massimo Venier

- Theatrical release poster
- Italian: Tu la conosci Claudia?
- Directed by: Massimo Venier
- Written by: Aldo, Giovanni & Giacomo; Massimo Venier; Valerio Bariletti; Walter Fontana
- Produced by: Paolo Guerra
- Starring: Aldo Baglio; Giovanni Storti; Giacomo Poretti; Paola Cortellesi
- Cinematography: Marco Pieroni
- Music by: Andrea Guerra
- Distributed by: Medusa Film
- Release date: 15 December 2004
- Running time: 94 minutes
- Country: Italy
- Language: Italian

Do You Know Claudia? (Italian: Tu la conosci Claudia?) is a 2004 comedy film directed by Massimo Venier and starring Aldo, Giovanni & Giacomo.

== Plot ==
Claudia and Giovanni have been married for seven years, but they are going through a relationship crisis. Claudia is convinced that helping someone else could be the best way to fix her problems, so she later steals a medical chart from her psychoanalyst’s office. That chart belongs to another patient, Giacomo. Claudia then starts to date him platonically. Giacomo, a divorced and depressed 40-year-old man, benefits a lot from Claudia's company and falls in love with her. This also greatly improves his mood.

Aldo, a taxi driver, is Claudia's lover. Since he’s convinced that Giovanni is her husband, he starts seeing him everywhere. Meanwhile, Giovanni becomes suspicious of Claudia and starts following her everywhere she goes, assuming that she’s cheating on him with Giacomo.

Aldo, Giovanni and Giacomo get involved in a car crash, and Giovanni strategically becomes friends with Giacomo to find out if he’s Claudia’s secret lover — while Aldo is still convinced that Giovanni is Claudia’s husband. After a discussion, the three men decide to drive to Calabria together, where Claudia went to isolate herself to ask her to choose one of them. During the journey, thanks to a picture shown by Giacomo, Aldo discovers that Claudia is not the same Claudia he was hanging out with.

In the meantime, Giacomo realises he isn’t in love with Claudia and decides to return to his ex-wife, hoping to get back with her. Giovanni and Aldo get back with their respective Claudias, but the latter couple does not last long, as Aldo gets tired of her after ten days. Aldo and Giovanni end up becoming good friends, and things get better between Giovanni and Claudia.

In the last scene, Claudia is seen holding a pregnancy test, while Giovanni is seen rocking a crying newborn baby, who doesn’t belong to him but turns out to be his neighbour’s son.

== Cast ==
- Aldo Baglio as Aldo
- Giovanni Storti as Giovanni
- Giacomo Poretti as Giacomo
- Paola Cortellesi as Claudia
- Sandra Ceccarelli as Silvia
- Ottavia Piccolo as the psychoanalyst
- Rossy de Palma as Claudia (Aldo's lover)
- Marco Messeri as Vanni Maceria
- Silvana Fallisi as Luciana
- Ruffin Doh Zeneyoun as Taribo
- Max Pisu as taxi's customer
