= Il cosmo sul comò =

- Poster of the film
- Directed by: Marcello Cesena
- Written by: Aldo, Giovanni & Giacomo; Valerio Bariletti; Marcello Cesena
- Produced by: Paolo Guerra
- Starring: Aldo Baglio; Giovanni Storti; Giacomo Poretti
- Cinematography: Agostino Castiglioni
- Music by: Paolo Silvestri
- Distributed by: Medusa Film
- Release date: 19 December 2008
- Running time: 94 minutes
- Country: Italy
- Language: Italian

Il cosmo sul comò (lit. 'The cosmos on the dresser') is a 2008 sketch comedy film directed by Marcello Cesena and starring Aldo, Giovanni & Giacomo.

== Cast ==
- Aldo Baglio as Puk / various
- Giovanni Storti as Tsu-Nam / various
- Giacomo Poretti as Pin / various
- Sara D'Amario as Giacomo's wife (Temperatura basale)
- Silvana Fallisi as Rita, Aldo's wife (Milano Beach) / Marie Antoinette (Falsi prigionieri)
- Sergio Bustric as Napoleon Bonaparte (Falsi prigionieri)
- Victoria Cabello as Lady with an Ermine (Falsi prigionieri)
- Raul Cremona as the dentist (Temperatura basale)
- Luciana Turina as Irma, Aldo's mother in law (Milano Beach)
- Angela Finocchiaro as Dr. Alexandra Gastani Frinzi (Temperatura basale)
- Elena Giusti as Dr. Giuliana Magnaghi Ciurli (Temperatura basale)
- Cinzia Massironi as Giacomo's wife (Milano Beach)
- Isabella Ragonese as the animal shop's clerk (L'autobus del peccato)
- Debora Villa as Giovanni's wife (Milano Beach)
- Marcello Cesena as Jean Claude (Falsi prigionieri)
- Lucianna De Falco as the gypsy (Temperatura basale)
