= The Wedding Days =

2022 film by Massimo Venier

- Theatrical release poster
- Italian: Il grande giorno
- Directed by: Massimo Venier
- Written by: Aldo, Giovanni e Giacomo; Massimo Venier; Davide Lantieri; Michele Pellegrini
- Produced by: Emanuela Rossi
- Starring: Aldo Baglio; Giovanni Storti; Giacomo Poretti; Antonella Attili; Elena Lietti; Lucia Mascino
- Cinematography: Vittorio Omodei Zorini
- Edited by: Enrica Gatto
- Music by: Brunori Sas
- Distributed by: Medusa Film
- Release date: 22 December 2022
- Running time: 100 minutes
- Country: Italy
- Language: Italian

The Wedding Days (Italian: Il grande giorno) is a 2022 Italian comedy film directed by Massimo Venier and starring Aldo, Giovanni e Giacomo.

== Plot ==
Giovanni and Giacomo are long-time business partners and friends who own the sofa manufacturing company Segrate Arredi. Their contrasting personalities shape their relationship: Giovanni is optimistic and impulsive, while Giacomo is cautious and meticulous, often dealing with health issues and nicknamed "Vomitino". Giovanni is remarried to Valentina after his first wife, Margherita, left him for Norway, while Giacomo is married to Lietta.

Their children, Elio and Caterina, are set to marry, prompting Giovanni to plan an extravagant wedding at the luxurious Villa Kramer on Lake Como, which Giacomo disapproves of due to the high costs. The wedding festivities face numerous mishaps, including an accident that ruins the wedding cake and a series of blunders caused by Margherita's new partner, Aldo, which lead to further complications.

Aldo recounts stories about Margherita, accidentally revealing that she cheated on Giovanni during a marital crisis with a certain "Vomitino", which is Giacomo's nickname. This revelation sparks turmoil: Giovanni confronts Giacomo, Lietta runs away in tears, Giacomo chases her, and Giovanni returns to his room disappointed. Valentina insults Margherita, who scolds Aldo for his careless words. Lietta wants to leave immediately but stays due to a lack of ferries. Giovanni confides in his wife about how Giacomo's actions led to his split from Margherita, which angers Valentina, prompting her to leave.

During a tense dinner later, the three couples avoid each other. A celebratory video for Elio and Caterina prompts Giovanni and Giacomo to resolve their issues. Valentina confronts Margherita, expressing her sacrifices for raising Caterina, while Margherita claims happiness with Aldo. Aldo overhears part of their conversation and, feeling mocked, decides to spend the night outside. Meanwhile, a dance party reveals that Caterina is having doubts about marrying Elio. Lietta informs Giacomo that their marriage will end the Monday after the wedding.

On the wedding day, Elio and Caterina decide they no longer want to marry, much to their parents' dismay. After the guests leave, only Giovanni, Valentina, Caterina, Giacomo, Lietta, Elio, Aldo, and Margherita remain, deciding to share leftover food.

== Cast ==
- Aldo Baglio as Aldo
- Giovanni Storti as Giovanni
- Giacomo Poretti as Giacomo
- Antonella Attili as Lietta
- Elena Lietti as Valentina
- Lucia Mascino as Margherita
- Margherita Mannino as Caterina
- Giovanni Anzaldo as Elio
- Pietro Ragusa as the maître d'hôtel
- Francesco Brandi as Don Francesco
- Dina Braschi as Annalisa
- Andrea Bruschi as Bistolfi
- Davide Calgaro as Gabbo
- Marouane Zotti as the head waiter
- Noemi Apuzzo as Sonia
- Matilde Benedusi as Martina
- Jerry Mastrodomenico as Landi
- Eleonora Romandini as Alessia
- Roberto Citran as Cardinal Pineider
- Francesco Renga as himself

== Production ==
The shooting of the film took place during the summer of 2022 at the Villa Frua in Stresa, and in various locations including Lake Como, Lake Maggiore, Milan and Brianza.
