= Gigio Alberti =

Italian actor (born 1956)

- Born: Luigi Alberti; 19 June 1956 (age 70); Milan, Italy
- Occupation: Actor
- Height: 1.83 m (6 ft 0 in)

Luigi "Gigio" Alberti (born 19 June 1956) is an Italian actor.

== Background ==
Born in Milan, Alberti studied at the acting school of the Piccolo Teatro, graduating in 1981. His career is mainly associated to Gabriele Salvatores, with whom he worked both on stage and in films, notably in Marrakech Express and Mediterraneo. He's also a mime.

== Selected filmography ==
- Kamikazen: Last Night in Milan (1987)
- Marrakech Express (1989)
- Mediterraneo (1991)
- Sud (1993)
- Bonus malus (1993)
- Ferie d'agosto (1995)
- Bits and Pieces (1996)
- Five Stormy Days (1997)
- Nirvana (1997)
- Marriages (1998)
- All the Moron's Men (1999)
- Ecco fatto (1998)
- My Mother's Smile (2002)
- Quo Vadis, Baby? (2005)
- The Bodyguard's Cure (2006)
- Women vs. Men (2011)
- Human Capital (2013)
- Solo (2016)
- Couch Potatoes (2017)
- Reckless (2018)
- Exterior Night (2022)
- Everyone on Board (2022)
- Another Summer Holiday (2024)
