= Aldo, Giovanni e Giacomo =

Trio of Italian comedians and film actors

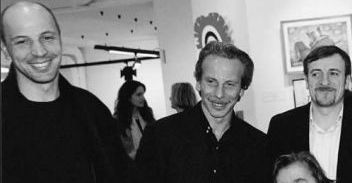

Comedy career
- Years active: 1991–present
- Medium: Film; television; theatre
- Genres: Sketch comedy; character comedy; blue comedy; surreal humor
- Subjects: Everyday life; pop culture; Italian culture; northern-southern Italy differences

Aldo, Giovanni e Giacomo are an Italian comedy trio known for their work as actors, directors, and screenwriters. The group consists of Aldo Baglio, Giovanni Storti and Giacomo Poretti. They have gained widespread popularity in Italy through their performances in movies, theater productions, and television.

Their humor is typically Milanese, with scenes that develop from a simple idea and that often center on stereotypical differences between northern and southern Italy.

== History ==
Aldo Baglio and Giovanni Storti met in Milan in mid-1970s. They both studied mime and dance at the school of drama of Milan's Teatro Arsenale. Baglio graduated in 1977, and Storti in 1978, and both soon joined cabaret shows.

Giacomo Poretti was part of the cabaret duo "Hansel and Strudel" with Marina Massironi, who was his girlfriend at the time and later his wife. In 1985, Baglio and Storti met Poretti and invited him to join them for some sketches. From 1991, they officially became a trio, and performed in theatres with Massironi.

Their first TV appearance was in summer 1992 on TG delle vacanze alongside Zuzzurro and Gaspare. That year, they participated in Su la testa! hosted by Paolo Rossi. Between 1993 and 1997, they appeared in Cielito Lindo with Claudio Bisio and in Mai dire Gol with Gialappa's Band. Their stage play Tel chi el telùn was broadcast on Canale 5 in 1999.

Their feature film debut was in 1997 with Three Men and a Leg, directed by Massimo Venier, which was well-received. They continued success with That's Life (1998), Ask Me If I'm Happy (2000), and The Legend of Al, John and Jack (2002).

In 2004, they joined Gialappa's Band for Mai dire domenica on Italia 1. In 2006, a film version of their play Anplagghed was released. They returned to the big screen in 2008 with Il cosmo sul comò. In 2009, they joined the cast of Che tempo che fa on Rai 3.

Their 2010 comedy The Santa Claus Gang was a box office hit. Later films include The Rich, the Pauper and the Butler (2014), Fuga da Reuma Park (2016), and I Hate Summer (2020), which received critical acclaim.

== Filmography ==
Year	Title	Role(s)			Notes
Year	Title	Aldo	Giovanni	Giacomo	Notes
1988	Kamikazen: Last Night in Milan	Man at restaurant	Police officer	None	
1997	Three Men and a Leg	Aldo / Al / Dracula	Giovanni / John / Gino	Giacomo / Jack / Michele	Also writers and directors
1998	That's Life	Aldo / Al	Giovanni / John	Giacomo / Jack	Also writers and directors
1999	All the Moron's Men	Sakato	Pocoto	Mamoto	
2000	Ask Me If I'm Happy	Aldo	Giovanni	Giacomo	Also writers and directors
2002	The Legend of Al, John and Jack	Al Caruso	John La Paglia	Jack La Paglia	Also writers and directors
2004	Do You Know Claudia?	Aldo	Giovanni	Giacomo	Also writers
2006	Anplagghed al cinema	Themselves			Documentary
2008	Il cosmo sul comò	Puk	Tsu'Nam	Pin	Also writers
2009	OceanWorld 3D	Narrators (voice)			Italian voice-over
2010	The Santa Claus Gang	Aldo	Dr. Storti	Dr. Poretti	Also writers
2013	Ammutta muddica al cinema	Themselves			Also writers
2013	Ci vuole un gran fisico	Taxi driver	Guardian angel	Client	Cameo roles
2014	The Rich, the Pauper and the Butler	Aldo / Samir	Giovanni	Dr. Giacomo Poretti	Also writers and directors
2016	Fuga da Reuma Park	Aldo	Giovanni	Giacomo	Also writers and directors
2020	I Hate Summer	Aldo	Giovanni	Giacomo	Also writers
2022	The Wedding Days	Aldo	Giovanni	Giacomo	Also writers

== Theatre ==
- I corti di Aldo, Giovanni e Giacomo (1996)
- Tel chi el telùn (1999)
- Potevo rimanere offeso! (2001)
- Anplagghed (2006)
- Ammutta muddica (2012)
- The Best of Aldo, Giovanni e Giacomo (2016)

== Honours ==
Ambrogino d'oro - Medaglia d'oro - ribbon for ordinary uniform

Ambrogino d'oro - Medaglia d'oro
— Milan, 7 dicembre 2010

== See also ==
- Tafazzi

Media related to Aldo, Giovanni e Giacomo at Wikimedia Commons
