= Hassani Shapi =

Kenyan actor (1973–2024)

- Born: Hassani Shapi; 15 July 1973; Mombasa, Kenya
- Died: 7 July 2024 (aged 50); Kenya
- Occupation: Actor
- Years active: 1989–2024
- Children: 1

Hassani Shapi (15 July 1973 – 7 July 2024) was a Kenyan actor, particularly active in Italian cinema. He was best known for the roles in the films Star Wars: Episode I – The Phantom Menace, The World Is Not Enough and Il maresciallo Rocca.

== Personal life ==
Shapi was born on 15 July 1973 in Mombasa, Kenya. He obtained his master's degree in Paris, France, in veterinary science. After becoming a veterinary doctor, he worked in a private clinic in Paris. After a few years, he quit the job to get into acting.

Shapi died in Kenya on 7 July 2024, at the age of 50, shortly before his 51st birthday.

== Career ==
Shapi first worked with an English theatre company in Paris called ACT. He has been involved in theater and played in several plays such as One Flew Over the Cuckoo's Nest, Animal Farm, The Old Man and the Sea and Don Quixote. In 1992, he made his television debut in some episodes of the series Runaway Bay directed by Tim Dowd. After six years in 1998, he reappeared in television for a single episode of the serial The Ambassador. In 2009, Shapi starred in the role of 'Saddam Hussein' in the Italian television serial Intelligence - Servizi & Secrets.

After he moved to America, he joined the cast of Law & Order in 2010. However, his most notable film appearance came through the role of Jedi Master 'Eeth Koth' in Star Wars: Episode I - The Phantom Menace which was filmed by George Lucas in 1999. In the film, he acted along with renowned actors, Liam Neeson, Ewan McGregor and Natalie Portman.

With the success of Star Wars, he was invited to take part in several major international productions such as Agent 007, The world is not enough, Irina Palm and Don't desire the woman of others. Meanwhile, he appeared in several Italian comedies such as Our Marriage Is In Crisis, Lezioni of Chocolate, Today Married, Sharm el Sheikh - An Unforgettable Summer, Nobody Can Judge Me, Females Versus Males, Without Art or Part, Chocolate Lessons 2 and The Extra Day With Fabio Volo.

== Filmography ==
- Star Wars: Episode I - The Phantom Menace (1999)
- The World Is Not Enough (1999)
- Our Marriage Is In Crisis (2002)
- Don't Desire the Other Woman (2004)
- Murder Unveiled (2005)
- Irina Palm (2007)
- Lessons in Chocolate (2007)
- Just Married (2009)
- Oggi sposi (2009)
- Sharm el Sheikh - An Unforgettable Summer (2010)
- Women vs. Men (2011)
- No One Can Judge Me (2011)
- Without Art or Part (2011)
- Chocolate Lessons 2 (2011)
- One Day More (2011)
- Escort in Love (2011)
- Land Gold Women (2011)
- The Extra Day (2011)
- Make a Fake (2011)
- Damascus Cover (2017)
- Scappo a casa (2019)
- Pop Black Posta (2019)

== Television ==
- Runaway Bay (1 episode, 1992)
- The Ambassador (1 episode, 1998)
- Arabian Nights – 1st Army Kaptain (2000)
- Murder Prevention (1 episode, 2004)
- Apparitions (2008)
- Intelligence - Services & Secrets (3 episodes, 2009)
- Inspector Coliandro (3rd season, episode 4, 2009)
- Law & Order: UK (1 episode, 2010)
- The Island (2012)
- Welcome to Table 2 - North vs South (1 episode, 2013)
- Anti-Mafia Squad - The Boss Returns Episode 8 (2016)
- The Island of Pietro (2017)
