= Generation 1000 Euros =

- Directed by: Massimo Venier
- Written by: Massimo Venier; Federica Pontremoli
- Starring: Alessandro Tiberi; Valentina Lodovini; Carolina Crescentini; Francesco Mandelli
- Cinematography: Italo Petriccione
- Music by: Giuliano Taviani; Carmelo Travia
- Release date: 2009
- Country: Italy
- Language: Italian

Generation 1000 Euros (Italian: Generazione 1000 euro, also known as The 1000 Euros Generation and Generazione mille euro) is a 2009 Italian comedy film written and directed by Massimo Venier. It is loosely based on a novel with the same name written by Antonio Incorvaia and Alessandro Rimassa.

The film received two nominations at Nastri d'Argento Awards, for best comedy film and for best supporting actress (Valentina Lodovini).

The film was released on April 24, 2009.

== Cast ==
- Alessandro Tiberi as Matte
- Carolina Crescentini as Angelica
- Valentina Lodovini as Beatrice
- Francesco Mandelli as Francesco
- Francesca Inaudi as Valentina
- Paolo Villaggio as The Professor
- Francesco Brandi as Faustino
- Steffan Boje as Mark Winterbottom
- Roberto Citran as Tassista
- Natalino Balasso as Landolfi

== See also ==
- List of Italian films of 2009
