= Marina Massironi =

Italian actress (born 1963)

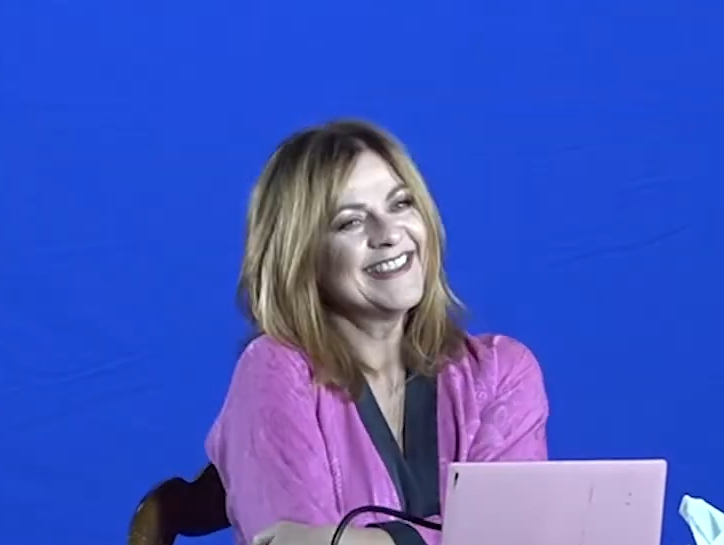
- Massironi on stage at the Teatro Petrarca in Arezzo, 2022
- Born: 16 May 1963 (age 62); Legnano, Italy
- Occupations: Actress; voice actress; comedian
- Years active: 1984–present
- Spouse: Giacomo Poretti (m. 1986; div. 1990)
- Relatives: Cinzia Massironi (cousin)

Marina Massironi (born 16 May 1963) is an Italian actress, voice artist, and comedian. A theatre actress since 1984, she has appeared in more than twenty films since 1987, and was awarded with the David di Donatello and Nastro d'Argento for Best Supporting Actress for her performance in Bread and Tulips (2000).

Massironi is best known to the Italian public for her past collaboration with the comedy trio Aldo, Giovanni e Giacomo, of which her former husband, Giacomo Poretti, is a member. She has also dubbed many animated characters in Italian; in 2021, she voiced Mrs. Marsigliese in both the English and Italian dubs of the animated Pixar/Disney film Luca.

== Selected filmography ==
Film
Year	Title	Role	Notes
1992	Tiramolla Adventures	Molly	Animated series, voice role
1997	Three Men and a Leg	Chiara / Giusy	
1998	That's Life	Clara	
1999	Not of This World	Marina	
1999	All the Moron's Men	Little Star	
2000	Bread and Tulips	Grazia	Awarded best supporting actress at the David di Donatello and Nastro d'Argento
2000	Ask Me If I'm Happy	Marina	
2003	Do You Mind If I Kiss Mommy?	Lorenza	
2004	Agata and the Storm	Ines Silvestri	
2009	The Ladies Get Their Say	Claudia	
2010	Letters to Juliet	Francesca	
2016	What's the Big Deal	Ivana	
2021	Luca	Mrs. Marsigliese (voice)	Animated film, original version and Italian-dubbed version
2024	50 km all'ora	Singer at the festival	

== Awards ==
- David di Donatello for Best Supporting Actress for Bread and Tulips (2000)
- Nastro d'Argento for Best Supporting Actress for Bread and Tulips (2000)
