= Fuga da Reuma Park =

2016 sketch comedy film

- Theatrical release poster
- Directed by: Aldo, Giovanni & Giacomo; Morgan Bertacca
- Written by: Aldo, Giovanni & Giacomo; Valerio Bariletti; Morgan Bertacca
- Produced by: Paolo Guerra
- Starring: Aldo Baglio; Giovanni Storti; Giacomo Poretti
- Music by: Mauro Pagani
- Distributed by: Medusa Film
- Release date: 15 December 2016
- Running time: 86 minutes
- Country: Italy
- Language: Italian

Fuga da Reuma Park (lit. 'Escape from Rheuma Park') is a 2016 Italian sketch comedy film directed by Aldo, Giovanni & Giacomo and Morgan Bertacca.

== Plot ==
On the Christmas Eve of 2041, Aldo is accompanied by his sons to Reuma Park, an amusement park for elderly people. There, he meets his old friends Giovanni and Giacomo, who are also residents of the park. The three plan to escape from the park during the Christmas holidays and, eventually, manage to do so by stealing a boat and sailing to Brazil.

== Cast ==
- Aldo Baglio as Aldo
- Giovanni Storti as Giovanni
- Giacomo Poretti as Giacomo
- Salvatore Ficarra as Salvatore
- Valentino Picone as Valentino
- Silvana Fallisi as Ludmilla
- Giorgio Centamore as the Nurse
- Luciano Storti as Prof. Barbisa
- Andrea Ramilli as Santa Claus
