= Giovanni Cacioppo =

Italian comedian and actor

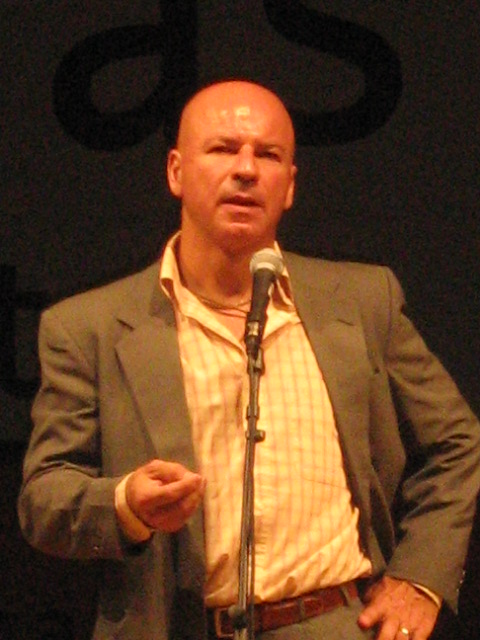
- Cacioppo in 2007
- Born: 14 July 1965 (age 61); Gela, Sicily, Italy
- Occupations: Comedian; Actor

Giovanni Cacioppo (born 14 July 1965) is an Italian stand-up comedian and actor, whose career spanned over 30 years.

== Life and career ==
Born in Gela, Cacioppo graduated as a surveyor in 1983, and practiced for ten years. He made his official debut as a stand-up comedian in 1992, with the monologue Porca miseria. Moved to Bologna, he won several comedy contests, and in 1994, he made his television debut as a guest on the Maurizio Costanzo Show.

After several television appearances, Cacioppo had his breakout in 1998, thanks to his participation in the Canale 5 variety show Zelig. The same year, he made his film debut in That's Life. His television credits include the variety shows Mai dire lunedì, Colorado café, and Che tempo che fa.
