= Bimba - È clonata una stella =

- Directed by: Sabina Guzzanti
- Written by: Sabina Guzzanti
- Cinematography: Giuseppe Lanci
- Music by: Paolo Silvestri
- Release date: 2002
- Language: Italian

Bimba - È clonata una stella (Bimba - A star is cloned) is a 2002 Italian comedy film written, directed and starred by Sabina Guzzanti.

It received a Nastro d'Argento nomination for the best original song ("Mucca cannibala").

== Cast ==
- Sabina Guzzanti as Bimba (Anna Cicciarelli) / Lucy
- Francesco Paolantoni as Dr. Cassi
- Adriana Asti as Fatima
- Antonio Catania as Dr. Macaluso
- Giovanni Esposito as Emilio
- Iaia Forte as Drama Teacher
- Stefania Orsola Garello as PR
- Neri Marcorè as 'Cavoli a merenda' Presenter
- Caterina Guzzanti as Rachele
- Olimpia Carlisi as The Madonna
