= Bread and Tulips =

2000 Italian film by Silvio Soldini

- Bread and Tulips poster
- Italian: Pane e tulipani
- Directed by: Silvio Soldini
- Written by: Doriana Leondeff; Silvio Soldini
- Produced by: Daniele Maggioni
- Starring: Licia Maglietta; Bruno Ganz; Giuseppe Battiston; Antonio Catania; Marina Massironi
- Cinematography: Luca Bigazzi
- Edited by: Carlotta Cristiani
- Music by: Giovanni Venosta
- Release date: 3 March 2000 (Italy)
- Running time: 114 minutes
- Country: Italy
- Language: Italian
- Box office: $19 million

Bread and Tulips (Italian: Pane e tulipani) is a 2000 romance comedy film directed by Italian film director Silvio Soldini. The movie stars Licia Maglietta and Bruno Ganz as Rosalba Barletta and Fernando Girasole. The film was an official selection at numerous film festivals, including the Cannes Film Festival and the Toronto International Film Festival.

== Plot ==
Rosalba Barletta, a Neapolitan-born housewife from Pescara, Italy, finds herself stranded during a family vacation. Instead of waiting for her controlling and unfaithful husband, she hitchhikes her way home, only to impulsively detour to Venice. In the lagoon city, the woman, who soon runs out of money, finds accommodations with a restaurant maître d'hôtel, Fernando Girasole, an elderly man from Iceland who speaks a refined and literary Italian. Rosalba finds herself enjoying her new life: she strikes up an affectionate friendship with the holistic masseuse Grazia, Fernando's neighbour, and finds a job at a small flower shop run by Fermo, an elderly and ill-tempered anarchist who is won over by the woman's polite ways.

Meanwhile, her husband sends Costantino, a bumbling plumber who has come for the interview to his company, as a private detective to find her. Rosalba is increasingly attracted by the delicate, romantic and mysterious personality of the discreet waiter, and a relationship of small daily gestures develops between them. On the other hand, during his search Costantino meets Grazia and instantly falls in love with her. He calls Rosalba's husband and quits his detective job, claiming that he no longer intends to look for his wife.

However, Rosalba is eventually joined by her husband's lover, a family friend, who induces her to return home, making her believe that her son has taken to drugs during her absence. She abandons her Venice life to return to her parental duties and daily routine, finding that nothing has changed at all and her son is not really in danger.

Left in Venice all by himself, Fernando borrows Fermo's van to undertake a journey to Pescara, where he finally declares his love to Rosalba. The woman thus returns to Venice for good with her youngest son.

== Cast ==
- Licia Maglietta as Rosalba Barletta
- Bruno Ganz as Fernando Girasole
- Giuseppe Battiston as Costantino Caponangeli
- Antonio Catania as Mimmo Barletta, Rosalba's husband
- Marina Massironi as Grazia Reginella
- Felice Andreasi as Fermo
- Vitalba Andrea as Ketty, Mimmo's lover
- Ludovico Paladin as Eliseo Girasole, Fernando's grandson
- Tatiana Lepore as Adele, Eliseo's mother
- Silvana Bosi as Costantino's mother
- Tiziano Cucchiarelli as Nicola "Nic" Barletta
- Don Backy as the singer in the dance hall
- Daniela Piperno as the woman giving a lift to Rosalba
- Fausto Russo Alesi as the man giving a lift to Rosalba

== Music ==
- "Moro" by Lars Hollmer
- "Franska Valsen" by Lars Hollmer
- Theme from "La Gazza Ladra" by Gioachino Rossini
- "Il Valzer di Vera Zasulich" by Giovanni Venosta
- "Disco Man" by Ranee Lee, Alain Leroux, Jacques Lafleche, sung by Ranee Lee
- "Eclisse Twist" by Michelangelo Antonioni, performed by Tuscolano Brothers
- "Frasi d'amori" by Aldo Caponi and Detto Mariano, sung by Don Backy
- "Tu Solamente Tu" (1939) by Pasquale Frustaci and Michele Galdieri, sung by Tiola Silenzi
- "Rosa y Clavel" by B. Valli and Giovanni Venosta, sung by Lorenzo Castelluccio accompanied by Rhapsodija Trio

== Box office ==
The film was released on 3 March 2000 in Italy. Despite not showing on more than 150 screens in the country, it stayed in the top 10 for over 17 weeks and grossed over $9 million. It opened in one theatre on 27 July 2001 in the United States and grossed $32,933 in its opening weekend. It went on to gross $5,318,679 in the United States and Canada. It grossed $3.8 million in Germany and $387,799 in Australia for a worldwide total in excess of $19 million.

== Awards ==
- 5 Nastro d'Argento: Best Actress, Best Director, Best Screenplay, Best Supporting Actor and Best Supporting Actress.
- 9 David di Donatello: Best Film, Best Director, Best Actress, Best Actor, Best Cinematography, Best Screenplay, Best sound, Best supporting actor (Giuseppe Battiston) and Best supporting actress (Marina Massironi).
