= Antonio Catania =

Italian actor (born 1952)

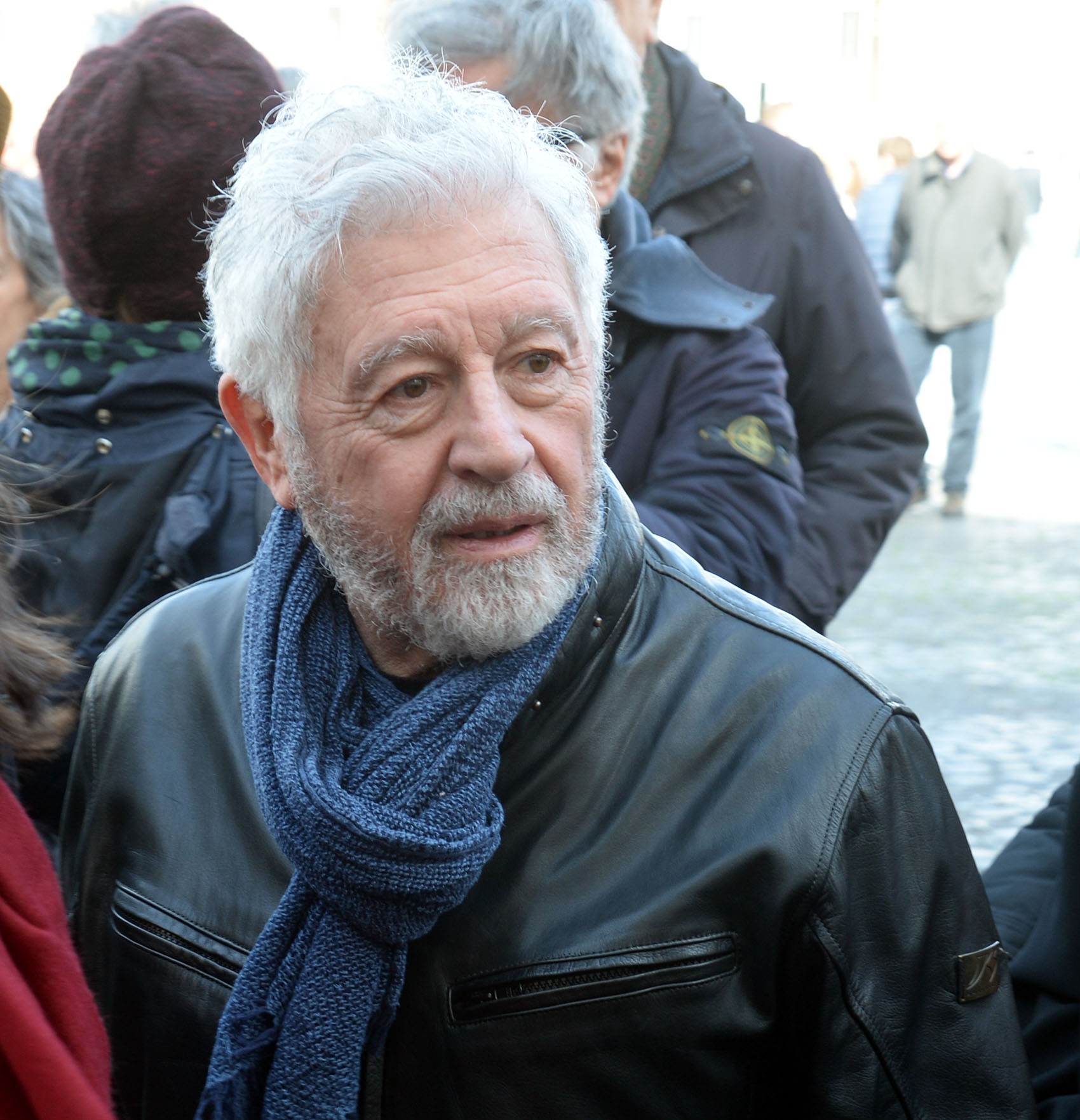
- Antonio Catania in 2026
- Born: 22 February 1952 (age 74); Acireale, Sicily, Italy
- Occupation: Actor

Antonio Catania (born 22 February 1952) is an Italian actor.

== Life and career ==
Born in Acireale, Province of Catania, when he was 16 Catania moved with his family to Milan, where he studied acting at the Drama School of the Piccolo Teatro. After graduating, he started an intense stage career, often working with Gabriele Salvatores with the stage company Compagnia dell'Elfo.

After a number of minor roles, Catania gained more substantial parts in the 1990s, working with directors such as Silvio Soldini, Carlo Verdone, Leone Pompucci, Nanni Moretti, and Gabriele Salvatores. Catania is also active in television, notably in the TV series Zanzibar, Boris, and The Bad Guy.

== Selected filmography ==
- Mediterraneo (1991)
- Puerto Escondido (1992)
- Mille bolle blu (1993)
- Camerieri (1995)
- Bits and Pieces (1996)
- Vesna Goes Fast (1996)
- Penniless Hearts (1996)
- Physical Jerks (1997)
- Nirvana (1997)
- The Game Bag (1997)
- The Dinner (1998)
- That's Life (1998)
- Outlaw (1999)
- Bread and Tulips (2000)
- This Is Not Paradise (2000)
- Ask Me If I'm Happy (2000)
- The Council of Egypt (2002)
- Bimba - È clonata una stella (2002)
- The Legend of Al, John and Jack (2002)
- It Can't Be All Our Fault (2003)
- Secret File (2003)
- Love Is Eternal While It Lasts (2004)
- The Bodyguard's Cure (2006)
- Night Bus (2007)
- Paul VI: The Pope in the Tempest (2008)
- The Worst Week of My Life (2011)
- The Christmas Week of My Life (2012)
- Boris: The Film (2011)
- Them Who? (2015)
- Belli di papà (2015)
- I babysitter (2016)
- The Stolen Caravaggio (2018)
- Dreamfools (2018)
- When Mom Is Away (2019)
- Odissea nell'ospizio (2019)
- Bitter Years (2019)
- Improvvisamente Natale (2022)
- Naples to New York (2024)
- Where Storks Dare (2025)
- Il malloppo (2026)
