= Luciana Littizzetto =

Italian comedian and actress

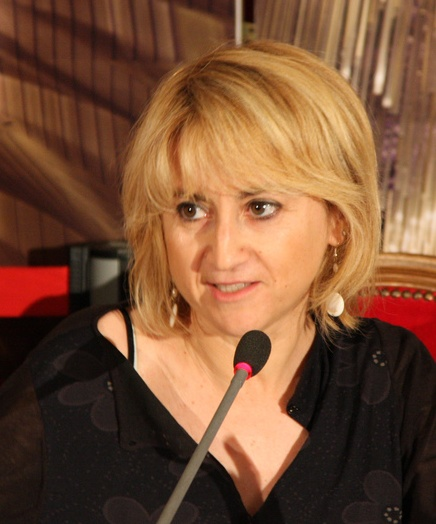
- Littizzetto in 2008
- Born: 29 October 1964 (age 61); Turin, Italy
- Education: University of Turin
- Partner: Davide Graziano (1997–2018)

Comedy career
- Years active: 1990–present
- Medium: Stand-up; television; books
- Genres: Feminist comedy; stand-up comedy; blue comedy; observational comedy; monologues; satire; insult comedy; character comedy (formerly)
- Subjects: Current events; pop culture; everyday life; Italian politics; gender differences; human behavior

Luciana Littizzetto (born 29 October 1964) is an Italian comedy actress, shock jock and humor writer.

Littizzetto is known in her home country for her irreverent gags, lampooning government ministers and church prelates alike.

Nicknamed "Lucianina" (Italian for Little Luciana), she is a prominent personality on Italian television, notably appearing weekly as guest on Rai 3's primetime show Che tempo che fa. Besides more trivial topics, she notably advocated a stricter policy in Italy dealing with sexual harassment.

== Career ==
Littizzetto grew up in the San Donato District in Turin where her family, originally from Bosconero, owned a milk and cheese shop.

Littizzetto graduated in 1984 from the Turin Conservatory with a piano playing degree. She later obtained a bachelor's degree from the University of Turin, at the Faculty of Humanities, and also attended an acting school in Moncalieri, close to Turin.

She briefly worked as a school teacher, but kept her stand-up comedy and acting skills in check by performing at local theatres in Turin and its province. Littizzetto subsequently worked as a voice actress, dubbing foreign soaps in Italian. Television appearances on the Maurizio Costanzo Show allowed her to eventually give up her teaching career and focus on her entertainer talents.

In 1993, she was part of the cast of the Italian TV show Cielito Lindo, playing the sketch character Sabrina. As such, she had her first catchphrase: "Minchia Sabbry!" ("The Hell, Sabbry!"). Subsequently, Littizzetto debuted on Rai Radio 2's Hit Parade.

During the 1990s, she worked mainly for Mediaset, debuting on the cabaret show Zelig.

Since then, Littizzetto has created several characters and has entertained the Italian public with her television, film, theatre and literary work. Up to 2014, Littizzetto authored 14 successful humour books. In some of them, she notoriously refers to male and female genitals as Walter and Iolanda, respectively.

In recent years, together with TV personality Fabio Fazio on his TV show Che tempo che fa, she has entertained Italian audiences on prime time with her humorous remarks about social trends. She has also shed light on cultural, social and political topics, notably calling for a bill in Italy to protect women against sexual harassment. These appearances have established her as a prominent TV personality of contemporary Italy. Littizzetto teamed up with Fazio several times. More recently, they voiced two characters for the Italian version of the movie Minions in 2015.

In 2007, Luciana Littizzetto was honored by the President of the Italian Republic, Giorgio Napolitano, with the prestigious De Sica Award, given for cultural and entertainment achievements. In both 2013 and 2014, Littizzetto was awarded Best Female on the Italian television.

In 2013, Littizzetto co-hosted the prestigious Sanremo Music Festival alongside long-time colleague Fabio Fazio, the show gaining high audience shares. Both hosts signed also for 2014, but that year the show proved to be unsuccessful, with an average audience share of 39%. Littizzetto was criticised for being paid €700,000 for co-hosting the Sanremo Festival.

From 2015 to 2017, Litizzetto was a judge on Italia's Got Talent from series 6 to series 8, broadcast in Italy by the pay-TV Sky Uno.

After 40 years of collaboration with state TV, RAI, Littizzetto and one of the most popular faces of Italian television, Fabio Fazio, are moving to the Warner Bros Discovery channel (NOVE). The debut is set for 15 October 2023.

== Personal life ==
Littizzetto describes herself as an animal lover. She publicly supported gay rights in Italy. Together with her boyfriend Davide Graziano, Littizzetto is a foster parent of three.

== Filmography ==
Films
Year	Title	Role	Notes
1997	We All Fall Down	Shop worker	Cameo appearance
1997	Three Men and a Leg	Giuliana Cecconi	
1999	Screw Loose	White Hair Woman	
1999	E allora mambo!	Lisa	
1999	La grande prugna	Giulia	
1999	All the Moron's Men	Stella's friend	
2000	Tandem	Police officer	Cameo appearance
2001	Ravanello pallido	Gemma Mirtilli	
2004	Se devo essere sincera	Adelaide Bertoglio	
2005	Manual of Love	Ornella	
2006	Cover Boy	House owner	Cameo appearance
2007	Ripopolare la reggia	Herself	
2008	Tutta colpa di Giuda	Sister Bonaria	
2010	Parents and Children: Shake Well Before Using	Luisa	
2010	Marriage and Other Disasters	Benedetta	
2010	Men vs. Women	Anna	
2011	Women vs. Men	Anna	
2011	One Day More	Mrs. Boldrini	
2012	È nata una star?	Lucia Cuviello	
2013	Wannabe Widowed	Susanna	
2015	Io che amo solo te	Dora	

Television
Year	Title	Role	Notes
2004	Camera Café	Herself	Episode: "Elezioni sindacali"
2008	Pinocchio	Talking Cricket	Main role
2009	Non pensarci – La serie	Marta	Main role
2011–2015	Fuoriclasse	Isabella Passamaglia	Lead role
2019	Romolo + Giuly	God	2 episodes
2019	Foodie Love	Heladera	Episode: "Gelato di Neve"
