= Augusto Zucchi =

Italian actor and film director (born 1946)

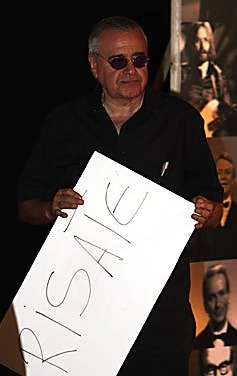
- Augusto Zucchi in 2008
- Born: 9 March 1946 (age 80); Varazze, Italy
- Occupation: Actor
- Years active: 1970-present

Augusto Zucchi (born 9 March 1946) is an Italian actor and theatre director. He appeared in more than seventy films since 1970.

== Selected filmography ==
Year	Title	Role	Notes
2012	Dracula 3D		
2009	Don't Look Back		
2007	The Trial Begins		
2000	Ask Me If I'm Happy		
1998	That's Life	Police commissioner	
1987	Devils of Monza		
