= The Nanny (1999 film) =

1999 Italian drama film

- Film poster
- Directed by: Marco Bellocchio
- Written by: Marco Bellocchio; Luigi Pirandello; Daniela Ceselli
- Produced by: Pier Giorgio Bellocchio
- Starring: Fabrizio Bentivoglio
- Cinematography: Giuseppe Lanci
- Edited by: Francesca Calvelli
- Music by: Carlo Crivelli
- Release date: 21 May 1999
- Running time: 106 minutes
- Country: Italy
- Language: Italian

The Nanny (Italian: La balia) is a 1999 Italian drama film directed by Marco Bellocchio. It is based on the short story with the same name by Luigi Pirandello. It made it into the 1999 Cannes Film Festival.

== Cast ==
- Fabrizio Bentivoglio - Prof. Mori
- Valeria Bruni Tedeschi - Vittoria Mori
- Maya Sansa - Annetta
- Jacqueline Lustig - Maddalena
- Pier Giorgio Bellocchio - Nardi
- Gisella Burinato
- Elda Alvigini - Lena
- Eleonora Danco - Patient
- Fabio Camilli - Broker
- Michele Placido - Belli Estate Patient
