= The Santa Claus Gang =

- Film poster
- Italian: La banda dei Babbi Natale
- Directed by: Paolo Genovese
- Starring: Aldo, Giovanni & Giacomo
- Release date: 17 December 2010
- Running time: 100 minutes
- Country: Italy
- Language: Italian

The Santa Claus Gang (Italian: La banda dei Babbi Natale) is a 2010 Italian Christmas comedy film directed by Paolo Genovese.

== Plot ==
During Christmas Eve, Aldo, Giovanni and Giacomo are arrested for home burglary. As the three were dressed as Santa Claus, the police think they are the Santa Claus Gang, a group of wanted thieves. During the night, they narrate a small but significant portion of their lives during the interrogation, until the real Santa Claus Gang is caught.

== Cast ==
- Aldo Baglio as Aldo
- Giovanni Storti as Giovanni
- Giacomo Poretti as Giacomo
- Angela Finocchiaro as Irene Bestetti
- Giovanni Esposito as Benemerita
- Sara D'Amario as Elisa
- Silvana Fallisi as Monica
- Antonia Liskova as Veronica
- Lucia Ocone as Marta
- Mara Maionchi as Giovanni's mother-in-law
- Giorgio Colangeli as Veronica's father
- Cochi Ponzoni as Terlizzi
- Massimo Popolizio as the junk dealer
- Remo Remotti as the tramp

== Accolades ==
| Year | Award | Category | Recipient(s) | Result | Ref. |
|---|---|---|---|---|---|
| 2011 | Nastro d'Argento | Best Actress | Angela Finocchiaro | Nominated | |
| 2011 | Nastro d'Argento | Best Comedy | Paolo Genovese | Nominated | |
| 2011 | Nastro d'Argento | Best Score | Franco Serafini and Massimiliano Pani | Nominated | |

== See also ==
- List of Christmas films
