= Ask Me If I'm Happy =

- Poster of the film
- Italian: Chiedimi se sono felice
- Directed by: Aldo, Giovanni & Giacomo; Massimo Venier
- Written by: Aldo, Giovanni e Giacomo; Massimo Venier; Paolo Cananzi; Walter Fontana; Graziano Ferrari
- Produced by: Paolo Guerra
- Starring: Aldo Baglio; Giovanni Storti; Giacomo Poretti; Marina Massironi
- Music by: Samuele Bersani
- Release date: 15 December 2000
- Running time: 97 min
- Country: Italy
- Language: Italian
- Box office: $28 million (Italy)

Ask Me If I'm Happy (Italian: Chiedimi se sono felice) is a 2000 Italian comedy drama film directed by Aldo, Giovanni & Giacomo and Massimo Venier.

== Plot ==
In Milan, three friends, Aldo, Giovanni and Giacomo do different jobs, although far below their expectations. So their dream is to set up a play adapted from Cyrano de Bergerac. Marina also joins them, although the company for listing on the scene proves to be very complicated.

== Cast ==
- Aldo Baglio as Aldo
- Giovanni Storti as Giovanni
- Giacomo Poretti as Giacomo
- Marina Massironi as Marina
- Silvana Fallisi as Silvana
- Daniela Cristofori as Daniela
- Antonio Catania as Antonio
- Giuseppe Battiston as Beppe
- Augusto Zucchi as Director of the Mall
- Paola Cortellesi as Dalia
- Valentino Picone as Doctor
- Max Pisu as Sandwich seller
- Arturo Brachetti as Stage manager
- Cinzia Massironi as Francesca
- Mohamed Elsayed as Security guard of the Mall

== Reception ==
It was the highest-grossing Italian film of the year, grossing $28 million.

== Accolades ==
Year	Award	Category	Recipient(s)	Result	Ref.
2001	Nastro d'Argento	Best Actor	Aldo, Giovanni & Giacomo	Nominated	
2001	Nastro d'Argento	Best Cinematography	Arnaldo Catinari	Nominated	
2001	Nastro d'Argento	Best Original Song	Samuele Bersani	Nominated	
