= All the Moron's Men =

- Italian: Tutti gli uomini del deficiente
- Directed by: Paolo Costella
- Written by: Andrea Salvadore; Enzo Santin; Gialappa's Band; Paolo Costella
- Starring: Claudia Gerini; Paolo Hendel; Marina Massironi; Giovanni Esposito; Gigio Alberti; Fabio De Luigi; Maurizio Crozza; Ugo Dighero
- Narrated by: Gialappa's Band
- Cinematography: Fabrizio Lucci
- Music by: Elio e le Storie Tese
- Release date: 17 December 1999
- Language: Italian

All the Moron's Men (Italian: Tutti gli uomini del deficiente) is a 1999 Italian comedy film directed by Paolo Costella.

The movie's title is a parody of All the President's Men (Tutti gli uomini del presidente in Italian).

== Cast ==
- Claudia Gerini as Stella Leone
- Arnoldo Foà as President
- Luciana Littizzetto as Stella's friend
- Paolo Hendel as Stella's husband
- Aldo, Giovanni & Giacomo as Yakuza criminals
- Maurizio Crozza as L.S. DJ
- Fabio De Luigi as Mr. Sacro Wok
- Gigio Alberti as Leon
- Rosalina Neri as Leon's mother
- Gioele Dix as Leon's victim
- Giovanni Esposito as Don Leone
- Andrea Brambilla as Guinea pig
- Marina Massironi as Little Star
- Ugo Dighero as Leone Stella
- Alessia Marcuzzi as Don Leone's fan
- Ellen Hidding as Policewoman
- Barbara D'Urso as Dr. Giò
- Ale e Franz as neighbours of Mr. Sacro Wok
- Bebo Storti as cleaner
- Carla Signoris as President's secretary
- Francesco Paolantoni as Leone Stella
- Francesco Salvi as Relocation Man
- Haruhiko Yamanouchi as Yakuza boss
- Enrico Mentana as himself
- Lamberto Sposini as himself
- Benedetta Corbi as herself
- Cristina Parodi as herself
- Barbara Snellenburg
