= Paolo Costella =

Italian screenwriter and film director

- Born: 19 February 1964 (age 62); Genoa, Italy
- Occupation: Screenwriter
- Years active: 1987-present

Paolo Costella (born 19 February 1964) is an Italian screenwriter and film director. He contributed to more than sixteen films since 1987.

== Selected filmography ==
Screenwriter
Year	Title	Notes
1987	Bellifreschi	
1988	Bye Bye Baby	
1991	The Flesh	
1992	Ricky & Barabba	
1999	All the Moron's Men	also director
2011	Baciato dalla fortuna	also director
2016	Perfect Strangers	
2018	There's No Place Like Home	
2020	The Best Years	
2021	Superheroes	
2023	The First Day of My Life	
2023	The Order of Time	
2024	Here Now	
2025	Madly	
