= Francesco Paolantoni =

Italian actor (born 1956)

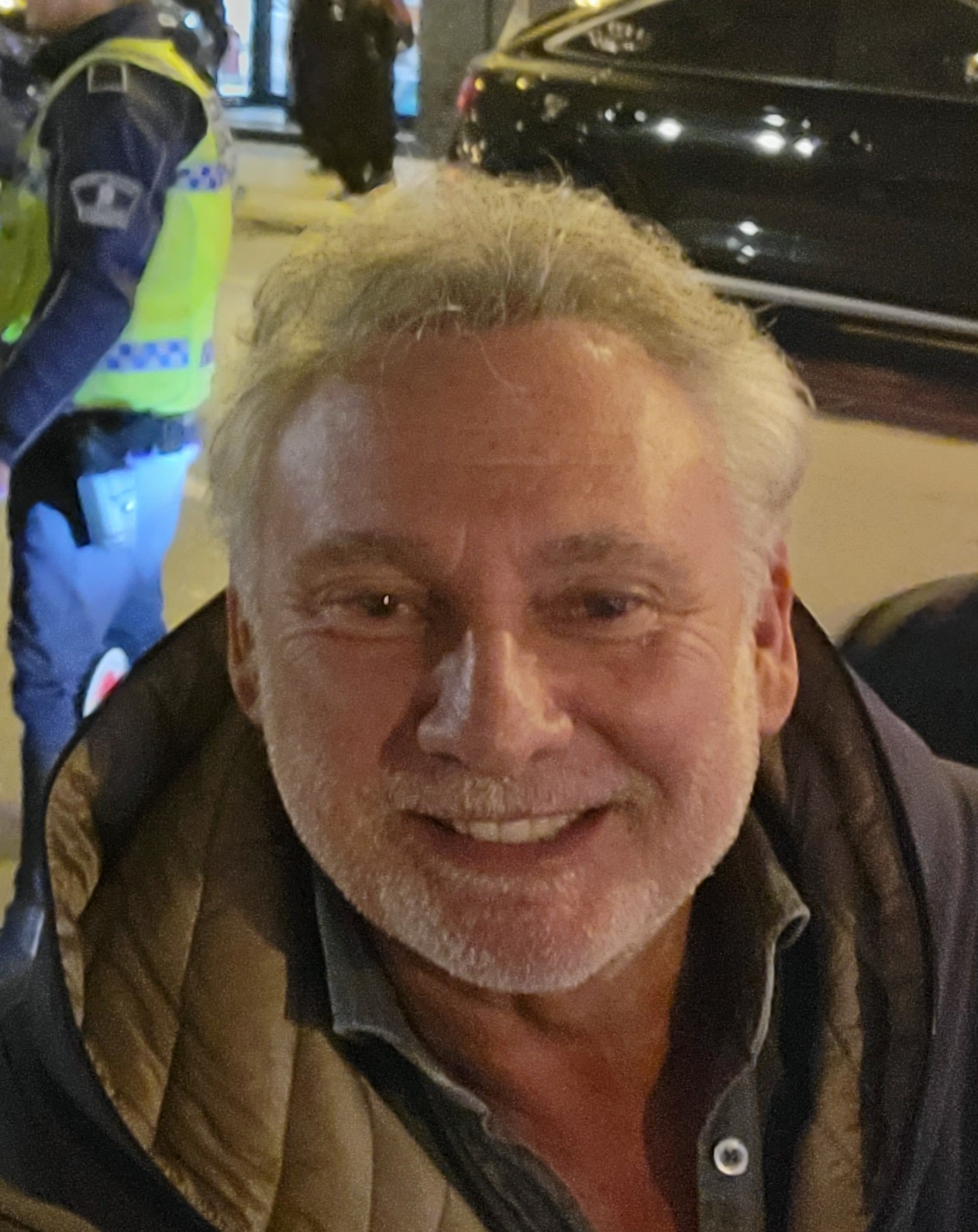
- Paolantoni in 2026
- Born: 3 March 1956 (age 70); Naples, Italy
- Occupation: Actor
- Height: 1.68 m (5 ft 6 in)

Francesco Paolantoni (born 3 March 1956) is an Italian film, stage and television actor and comedian.

== Biography ==
Born in Naples, Paolantoni studied acting at the Accademia Nazionale di Arte Drammatica Silvio D'Amico in Rome, then he started a career as a dramatic stage actor in the late 1970s.

In 1987, he debuted as a comedian in Renzo Arbore's variety show Indietro tutta, but the real success came in 1996, with Gialappa's Band's television show Mai dire Gol and later with the participation in the television show Quelli che... il Calcio.

Paolantoni is also active in films, in which he has worked with Paolo Virzì, Mario Martone, Cristina Comencini and Sabina Guzzanti, among others.

== Personal life ==
Paolantoni had a long-time relationship with actress Paola Cannatello and has no children. He's an atheist.
