= Everyone on Board =

2022 Italian comedy film

- Italian: Tutti a bordo
- Directed by: Luca Miniero
- Written by: Luca Miniero; Michele Abatantuono; Lara Prando
- Starring: Stefano Fresi; Giovanni Storti; Carlo Buccirosso
- Cinematography: Federico Angelucci
- Edited by: Ian Degrassi
- Music by: Santi Pulvirenti
- Release date: 29 September 2022
- Running time: 81 minutes
- Country: Italy
- Language: Italian

Everyone on Board (Italian: Tutti a bordo) is a 2022 Italian comedy film written and directed by Luca Miniero, starring Stefano Fresi, Giovanni Storti and Carlo Buccirosso.

It was released in Italy on 29 September 2022.

== Plot ==
Bruno finds himself accompanying eight children, including his son Juri, on a train journey to a summer school in Sicily. When the other chaperone falls ill at the last minute, Bruno ends up alone with the responsibility, and the parents decide to cancel the trip due to the children's lively behavior. Claudio, Bruno's father and a doctor, steps in to reassure everyone, offering to accompany the kids along with Bruno, who, knowing his father's reckless nature, is not entirely convinced. After saying goodbye to the parents, however, the two get distracted and realize too late that the train, on which the children had already boarded, has departed without them. The children, without adult supervision, enjoy the journey.

Bruno and Claudio embark on a wild adventure: they board a Frecciarossa bound for Paris without tickets, try to trick a ticket inspector, and end up in Genoa with a Medical Emergency helicopter after various unforeseen events. Meanwhile, the children are traveling through Bologna, Tuscany, Rome and then towards Sicily, facing various obstacles and trying to escape from a ticket inspector named Mario.

== Cast ==
- Stefano Fresi as Bruno
- Giovanni Storti as Claudio
- Carlo Buccirosso as Mario
- Giulia Michelini as Chiara
- Gigio Alberti as the man with a hat
- Elena Cotta as Licia
- Alessandro Besentini as the pilot
- Massimo Ceccherini as Cosimo
- Viviana Cangiano as Laura
- Federica Sabatini as Greta
- Laline Cafaro as Ada
- Lorenzo Gentile as Giulio
- Zowie Giovine as Milo
- Leone Girlanda as Juri
- Irene Koka as Stella
- Davide Paoletti as Eduardo
- Daniele Saitta as Mirko
- Antonio Zumbo as Daniele
- Orsetta Borghero as Astrid, Stella's mother
- Giorgia Cardaci as Anna, Giulio's mother
- Rosaria D'Urso as a nun
- Maylis Ithurbide as the French ticket inspector
- Gaia Messerklinger as Sofia, Ada's mother
- Heléna Antonio as Agata, Eduardo's mother
- Davide Bechini as Romeo, Eduardo's father
- Alessandro Intini as Sandro, Ada's father
- Fiorella Zullo as Carla, Mirko and Daniele's mother
- Paolo Giangrasso as Oscar, Mirko and Daniele's father
- Andrea Vasone as Donato, Giulio's father
- Cristina Pasino as Benedetta, Milo's mother
