= Massimo Venier =

Italian film director

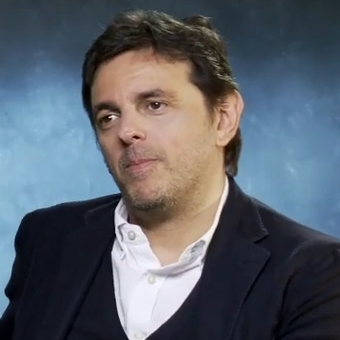
- Born: 26 March 1967 (age 57); Varese, Italy
- Occupation(s): Film director, screenwriter

Massimo Venier (born 26 March 1967) is an Italian film director and screenwriter.

== Filmography ==
- Three Men and a Leg (1997)
- That's Life (1998)
- Ask Me If I'm Happy (2000)
- The Legend of Al, John and Jack (2002)
- Do You Know Claudia? (2004)
- I Trust You (2007)
- Generation 1000 Euros (2009)
- One Day More (2011)
- Wannabe Widowed (2013)
- I Hate Summer (2020)
- The Wedding Days (2022)
