= Paolo Rossi (actor) =

Italian actor (born 1953)

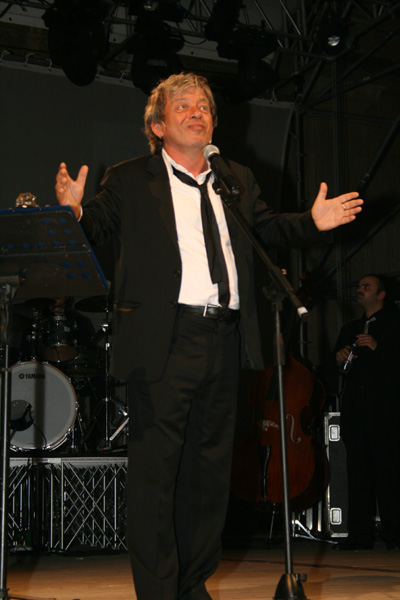
- Born: 22 June 1953 (age 73); Monfalcone, Gorizia, Italy
- Occupation: Actor
- Height: 1.58 m (5 ft 2 in)

Paolo Rossi (born 22 June 1953) is an Italian actor, writer, comedian, singer-songwriter and television personality.

== Life and career ==
Born in Monfalcone, Gorizia, Rossi graduated as a chemical expert, then he moved to Milan where he debuted on stage in 1978, in Dario Fo's Histoire du Soldat. After having been a member of the stage company "compagnia dell'Elfo" he started signing numerous theatrical monologues and stage plays of critical success that were paired in their style with the Commedia dell'arte, Brecht's and Molière's and for which he was referred to as "an Italic middle way between Dario Fo and Lenny Bruce".

Rossi is active on television, in successful variety shows such as Su la testa and Il laureato, and in films, in which he debuted in 1986. Rossi's multifaceted career also include music: since early 1990s he released several albums and collaborated with several notable artists and groups including Enzo Jannacci, Emir Kusturica, Vinicio Capossela and Modena City Ramblers. He also entered the competition at the Sanremo Music Festival in two editions, in 1994 and in 2007. In 1996, Rossi won a Silver Ribbon for the screenplay of the Leone Pompucci's comedy film Camerieri.
