= Gialappa's Band =

Italian radio and TV comedy trio

Gialappa's Band is the collective name used by Marco Santin (born 11 February 1962 in Milan), Carlo Taranto (born 16 December 1961 in Milan), and Giorgio Gherarducci (born 1 November 1963 in Milan), an Italian trio of TV and radio commentators.

== Overview ==
Gialappa's Band formed in 1985 at the Radio Popolare of Milan, where they launched the show Bar Sport. The show contained satirical commentary on Sunday matches of Italian football Serie A. The trio also commented on the FIFA World Cup, employing large doses of sarcasm and sound effects (smashed glass and car crashes for tackles and fouls, babies crying for injured players, sounds of hammers and saws for medical interventions on the pitch, etc.) to emphasize on-screen action. Their delivery was hectic and at times chaotic, sharpened by hyperbole and zany, sharp, non-sequitur witticisms. The format was very successful and, as of 2006, they have broadcast comments on every football match for the European Championships and World Cups since 1986. Several UEFA Champions League and UEFA Cup matches were also commentated upon during the 1990s.

The trio also employed mock national anthems, such as the Sex Pistols' "Anarchy in the U.K." for England, Krautrock tracks for Germany, etc. They eventually moved to private radio station Radio Deejay, and later on to Radio Due. In 2006, Sky Sport offered Gialappa's Band as an alternative live commentary to its official broadcast featuring Fabio Caressa and Giuseppe "Beppe" Bergomi — which coincided with Italy winning that year's World Cup, its first since 1982 and its fourth title overall.

At the same time, Gialappa's Band were hired as television writers for several shows broadcast by Silvio Berlusconi's network Mediaset. Their first original show was 1989's Mai dire Banzai (Never Say Banzai!), an Italian interpretation of the Japanese game shows Takeshi's Castle and Za Gaman. As in all of their previous shows, the trio never appeared on-screen, instead, adding voice-over comments, often mocking the acting characters.

The success of Mai dire Banzai spurred their most famous TV show, Mai dire Gol (Never Say Goal!) as well as the similar Mai dire Mundial (Never Say World Cup!), which was devoted to the 1990 FIFA World Cup and repeated for the 1994 edition. These formats, very similar in concept to the radio program Bar Sport, featured performances by various comical actors. During Mai dire Gol's long run, Gialappa's Band hosted such actors as Teo Teocoli, Gene Gnocchi, Antonio Albanese, Paola Cortellesi, Bebo Storti, Claudio Bisio, Neri Marcorè, Maurizio Crozza, Aldo, Giovanni & Giacomo, Daniele Luttazzi, Gioele Dix, Luciana Littizzetto, Paolo Hendel, Fabio De Luigi, and many others. Several of these actors gained popularity in Italy through their work on the show. Currently, Gialappa's Band have parlayed the show into an alternative commentary program on RTL Radio, entitled Noi dire Gol (We Say Goal), which has included commentary from Euro 2012 and the 2014 FIFA World Cup.
