= Mai dire Gol =

Italian football television program

- Presented by: Gialappa's Band

Production
- Producer: Massimo Fusi
- Running time: 30 minutes

Original release
- Network: Italia 1
- Release: 18 November 1990 – 25 February 2001

Mai dire Gol is an Italian football television program of featuring Gialappa's Band, which was broadcast on Italia 1 from 18 November 1990 to 25 February 2001. The program was, at the beginning, the footballing version of Gialappa's Band's Mai dire Banzai, a show centered around the Japanese show Takeshi's Castle, as well as the "successor" of Mai dire Mundial, a program which showcased previous World Cup games' commentary (the program was aired a few months prior to the release of Mai dire Gol, between May and June 1990).

The show was the most popular program of the trio, and was centered on the errors, the gaffes, and the funny attitudes of some players and coaches in the previous matchday of Serie A, as well as of foreign leagues. It was initially broadcast on Sunday in a shorter version and, between the 1992–93 and 1996–97 seasons, also on Monday as Mai dire Gol del Lunedì. The success was such that the format, characterized by the background voices of Gialappa's Band, had been adapted for other different programs (Mai dire TV, Mai dire Maik, Mai dire Grande Fratello, etc.), but always commented on by the comic trio.
