= Eat the Phikis =

Studio album by Elio e le Storie Tese
- Released: 1996
- Genres: Comedy rock, progressive rock
- Length: 55:42
- Labels: Aspirine; Sony BMG
- Producer: Otar Bolivecic

Elio e le Storie Tese chronology
Esco dal mio corpo e ho molta paura: Gli inediti 1979–1986 (1993)	Eat the Phikis (1996)	Del meglio del nostro meglio Vol. 1 (1997)

Eat the Phikis is the 1996 album by Italian rock band Elio e le Storie Tese, published after their second-place finish at the Sanremo Music Festival 1996 with the song La terra dei cachi, a humorous take on Italian lifestyle.

Eat the Phikis had a good commercial success in Italy, by keeping the first place in the best-selling album chart (FIMI) for four consecutive weeks.

== Songs ==
As usual for the band, the album lyrics are simultaneously serious and jocular, as they discuss a number of social and personal topics in an ironical tone. On a musical level, the album alludes to several other musical works by other people.

- At the beginning of "Vincitori o campioni?", voices by judges of Jeux sans frontières are heard. Voices from Teatro Ariston (in which Sanremo Music Festival is hosted) come next.
- "La terra dei cachi" (English: "The land of persimmons") is a satirical song about Italy, described as a land where its lifestyle is celebrated in spite of a number of problems in politics, public health, welfare and society in general. It includes several quotes from Italian and international songs and musical pieces, such as "Papaveri e papere" by Nilla Pizzi, "Una lacrima sul viso" by Bobby Solo, "La donna cannone" by Francesco De Gregori, the second movement ("Air") from Johann Sebastian Bach's Suite No. 3 in D major, BWV 1068, and a short quote from "In the Flesh?" by Pink Floyd.
- "Burattino senza fichi" (English: "Puppet without figs", meant as sex organs) explores the band's recurring theme of sexual frustration, (Note: Other examples include "Uomini col borsello" and "Cartoni animati giapponesi" on their previous album, İtalyan, rum casusu çikti.) through a parody of Carlo Collodi's Pinocchio. The title parodies Edoardo Bennato's 1977 album Burattino senza fili, also inspired by the Pinocchio tale. In the song, Pinocchio laments not having a penis until Geppetto makes one for him; at that point, he becomes obsessed by sex. The song also includes references to "Più ci penso" by Gianni Bella, "Get Back" by The Beatles, the soundtrack to The Adventures of Pinocchio by Fiorenzo Carpi, and "It's a Long Way to Tipperary", a World War I song sung many times by Snoopy.
- "T.V.U.M.D.B." (an Italian abbreviation for "Ti voglio un mondo/mare/monte di bene", translated as "My fondness for you is as big as the world/the sea/a mountain", used for SMS) is about contemporary youth culture and features a dialogue between a boy (played by Elio) who is in love with a teenage girl (played by guest Giorgia) because of her uncomformist attitude; she is described as a graffiti artist (but also as a fan of Take That's Gary Barlow) and she is unwilling to commit to a long-term relationship. The song is freely based on the music of Earth, Wind & Fire and particularly on their 1979 single "After the Love Has Gone". A snippet from the soundtrack to the film Jaws is also heard in the song. Additionally, the intro starts with a musical hint taken from "Primary" by The Cure and Giorgia sings the words "e poi" (English: "Later on") on the same melody as the same words in "E poi", her first hit in 1994, those words being the only ones she sings together with Elio. Also, a line in the lyrics, "Senti come grida il peperone: pam" (English: "Hear how the banana pepper screams out: bang"), is a reference to a line from "Piattaforma", one of Elio e le Storie Tese's earliest songs, featured on their first album. In the very last line of lyrics, Elio references Japanese cult leader Shoko Asahara, the mastermind behind the 1995 Tokyo subway sarin attack, by singing "Olfa il gas nervino del santone", i.e. "smell the guru's sarin gas", with an invented verb meaning "smell".
- A remake of "Il concetto di banana", a signature tune for Gialappa's Band's TV comedy show Mai dire Gol (which would feature in its original version on the band's following album, the compilation Peerla) "Lo stato A, lo stato B" (English: "The A state, the B state") is about the love vs. sex dilemma. The first verse describes a couple engaging in passionate but loveless sex; the second verse is about a girl who would like to actually be in love with a very fat boy she has sex with, but she is hindered by his body; the third verse is an ironical statement about prostitution. The song features a slightly reworked sample from Cutty Ranks' 1993 song "Limb by limb". Guest Enrico Ruggeri sings a re-worded excerpt from his own song "Quello che le donne non dicono".
- A Latin American styled song, "El Pube" ("The pubic region" in mock-Spanish) is about a Mexican travelling salesman of sex gadgets (such as ointments and cream tubes with purported "sexual" powers), who crashes his plane in a small village square and causes a sensation among the locals, quickly selling out all of his goods and being hailed as a hero. There are several allusions in the lyrics: the word "emozionando" (English: "getting emotions") beings sung on the same melody as the same word in Giorgia's 1995 song "Come saprei", "El pueblo unido" from "El pueblo unido jamás será vencido" by Quilapayún, and two lines from Massimo Ranieri's 1995 torch song "La vestaglia".
- "Omosessualità" (English: "Homosexuality") is a punk rock song, conforming to the typical habit of late 1970s genre originators Sex Pistols, and others, to build songs using a limited number of words and phrases and repeating them many times (and simultaneously mocking the same habit). In the song, a gay man sings about homosexuality as a perfectly normal human condition (saying he cannot do anything about it) and being very happy with it. Bassist Nicola Fasani (a.k.a. Faso) strongly disliked the song, which resulted in the bass part being played by Elio himself.
- "Mio cuggino" is a satirical song about urban legends, quoting a number of them and implicitly revealing their absurdity by involving the singer's hypothetical cousin ("cugino" in Italian, written here with a deliberately wrong double G) in all of them. Aldo Baglio from Aldo, Giovanni e Giacomo plays the "cousin". The song includes quotes from Toto's soundtrack for David Lynch's 1984 film Dune and "Autobahn" by Kraftwerk. At 1:53 into the song, Elio parodies Ike Willis's shouted pronunciation of "You know" (as "unoooooohhh") in "Sy Borg" by Frank Zappa (from Joe's Garage), while percussionist Naco, who is featured on the song and was tragically killed in a 1995 car accident, does a vocal impression of a drum fill in the style of Tullio De Piscopo.
- "First me, second me" (intended as "Before me, according to me") is the band's first officially released song to include a lyric written almost entirely in Elio's own fake English, a very literal Italian-to-English translation. "First me" is sung entirely by Elio, who references The Beatles and employs several electronically pitch-altered overdubs of his voice as an allusion to Fab Four producer George Martin's tape speed-manipulation techniques. The second section, "Second me", features James Taylor trying to win the affection of a girl he has just met by singing to her in a completely faked English. During the 23 January 2012 episode of Deejay chiama Italia, a phone-in music show/talk show on Radio Deejay, where Taylor guested together with the band's keyboardist Sergio Conforti (also known as Rocco Tanica), the latter explained that, in order to convince the band's then-labelmate Taylor to sing in an invented form of English, he had to teach him the lyrics literally word by word. The second fake English section is a shortened version of "The peak of the mountain", an early (1986) song by Elio, often performed live but never officially released. The song also alludes to the 1986 film Highlander and to its climactic head-cutting duel.
- "Milza" (English: "Spleen") is a medical-themed satire, where the singer describes his body using seemingly correct but trivial medical terminology, stating at the end that he ignores the actual function of his spleen. The song is in the style of early Genesis, but without any specific musical allusions.
- Giorgia guests again on "Li immortacci", which also includes popular singer Edoardo Vianello (singing on the melody of his own 1960s song "I Watussi") and features a lyric about famous dead rock stars living secretly in a quasi-immortal state ("mortacci (tua)" is a Roman swear word roughly meaning "your damned dead"). "Li immortacci" are Jimi Hendrix (er Chitara, "the Guitar" in Roman dialect), Freddie Mercury (er Mafrodito, "the Hermaphrodite"), Bob Marley ("er Rastamanno"), Federico Monti Arduini (er Guardiano der Faro, "the Lighthouse Keeper", Arduini's stage name), Elvis Presley (er Pelvicaro, "the Pelvis"), Michael Jackson (er Thrilleraro, "the Thriller man"), (Note: Arduini and Jackson were actually alive by the time the song was released (1996).) Jim Morrison (er Lucertolaro, "the Lizard King"), John Lennon (er Quattrocchi Immaginaro, "'the Bespectacled Imagining Man", a reference to "Imagine"), Luigi Tenco (er Vedraro, "the Foreseer", a reference to Tenco's song "Vedrai, vedrai"), Ian Curtis (l'Impiccato, "the Hanged Man"), Kurt Cobain (er Fucilense, "the Man with the Shotgun"), and Brian Jones (er Piscina, the Pool Man, a reference to Jones's presumedly accidental drowning in a pool); the identity of er Tromba ("the Trumpet", also in Roman dialect) is uncertain. There are also quotes from Lisa Marie Presley and Haile Selassie. Musically, there is a sample of "We Are the Champions" by Queen (and of Mercury's voice), and in the part dedicated to Jim Morrison, some of the lyrics are similar to a section of "The End" by the Doors.
- "Tapparella" (English: "Apartment blind") is about a junior prom party from which the protagonist, a stereotypical misfit, is deliberately excluded for unclear reasons (although bullying is vaguely implied); toward the end, he ends up organizing his own party. The song includes lyrical and musical quotes from "Little Wing" by Jimi Hendrix, "Strawberry Fields Forever" by The Beatles, "Gente per bene e gente per male" by Lucio Battisti, and "Impressioni di settembre" by Premiata Forneria Marconi.
- "Neanche un minuto di non caco" (English: "Not even a minute of non-persimmon", with a pun on "don't shit") is a sped-up version of "La terra dei cachi" and its title refers to "Neanche un minuto di non amore" by Lucio Battisti. Both this song and its normal speed version are live recordings from the 1996 Sanremo Music Festival.
- After about three minutes of silence, the album concludes with the second encrypted ghost track in the band's discography, following a similar one on İtalyan, rum casusu çikti. Like its predecessor, this track is recorded at an extremely fast speed (here, about 16x) and reversed; in order to decrypt it, listeners would have to play it back in the correct direction and at its normal speed, which resulted in a very bad sound quality. The track itself consists of nine individual songs; six of them are early versions or rehealsal fragments of tracks from the album, one is a rehearsal for a then-officially-unreleased track ("La cinica lotteria dei rigori", which would feature on Peerla), one is an otherwise unreleased comedy dialogue by Elio and Rocco Tanica, titled "Il vice-capo del mondo" (English: "The vice-chief of the world", with Elio imagining himself as a world ruler who delegates everything to his deputy, Tanica, in order to spend his time by playing PC games; at one point Elio suggests turning the improvised dialogue into a song, which never materialized) and one is a power ballad titled "Bis" (English: "(Play it) Again", but also punning on büs, the Milanese word for "hole"), sung by Enrico Ruggeri in the style of Luciano Ligabue, also previously unreleased. This latter song would be re-recorded with Elio on vocals for the band's 1999 album Craccracriccrecr, but it remained unreleased in this version with Ruggeri.

=== Intentional mistakes in the lyrics of "First Me, Second Me" ===
"First Me"

- First me is a literal Italian-to-English translation, meaning "before me" or "earlier than me";
- I would like to writing and singing a song in english: incorrect use of -ing forms and missing capital on "English";
- tongue that I've studied at the medium school: literal translations (tongue = language, as in "mother tongue"; medium school = middle school) and redundant present perfect tense;
- I'd surely find the way to recreate the original sound of the wonderful Beatles english: missing capital E.
- I would pick up a girl and - thank you to the original sound: literal translation, "thank you" vs. "thank(s) to";
- of the wonderful Beatles english: missing capital E;
- I would conquer her: literal translation (conquer her = win her over);
- so many much childs: redundant "much" and wrong plural ("childs");
- So we would live until the late age (her): literal translation (late age = old age) and redundant "her";
- but without cut the head: missing "-ing" form.
- unjamestaylorable: malapropism and invented adjective;
- unstatesmanlike dream come true: malapropism.

"Second Me (The Peak of the Mountain)"

- Second me is a literal Italian-to-English translation, meaning "according to me";
- The peak of the mountain: is a literal translation, meaning "the mountain top";
- How you call you?: literal word-by-word translation ("Come ti chiami?" = What's your name?);
- How many years you have?: literal word-by-word translation ("Quanti anni hai?" = How old are you?);
- From where come?: literal word-by-word translation ("Da dove vieni?" = Where are you from?);
- How stay?: literal word-by-word translation ("Come stai? " = How are you?);
- Not to be sad: wrong verb form ("don't be sad")
- the life is a thing wonderful: redundant the and wrong word order;
- and I am here for make it wonderfuler: wrong preposition (for = to) and wrong comparative (wonderfuler = more wonderful);
- Not see the my love for yourself?: wrong verb form ("don't you see"), redundant the and wrong pronoun (yourself = you).
- For force, not is visible: literal word-by-word translation (Per forza = I bet/I bet you), missing "it" and wrong word order;
- Not hear the sound of the my guitar?: wrong verb form ("don't you hear") and redundant second the;
- Is play from me: literal translation. According to signs being shown during early live performances, this is meant as "it is played by me".
- is play for you, is play for we: missing "it", wrong verb tenses and wrong pronoun (we = us);
- must to be the my girl: missing "you", redundant to and the;
- come on the my car: wrong preposition (on = in) and redundant the;
- that I bring you at make one tour: literal word-by-word translation, meant as "che ti porto a fare un giro" = so I can take you on a trip;
- What think of the my car?: missing question form ("do you") and redundant the;
- Is much beautiful, second me: missing "it", wrong adverb (much = very) and literal translation (second me = according to me).

== Track listing ==
1. "Vincitori o campioni?" – 1:59
2. "La terra dei cachi" – 4:21
3. "Burattino senza fichi" – 4:52
4. "T.V.U.M.D.B." – 5:26
5. "Lo stato A, lo stato B" – 4:31
6. "El Pube" – 5:03
7. "Omosessualità" – 3:34
8. "Mio cuggino" – 5:36
9. "First Me, Second Me" – 3:32
10. "Milza" – 4:34
11. "Li immortacci" – 4:40
12. "Tapparella" – 6:31
13. "Neanche un minuto di non caco" – 1:03

== Personnel ==
- Stefano Belisari as Elio – vocals, bass on track 7
- Sergio Conforti as Rocco Tanica – keyboards
- Davide Civaschi as Cesareo – guitars
- Nicola Fasani as Faso – bass
- Paolo Panigada as Feiez – sax, guitar, keyboards, backing vocals
- Christian Meyer as Millefinestre – drums

Guest musicians

- Curt Cress – drums on tracks 3 and 12
- Vinnie Colaiuta – drums on tracks 5, 6, 8 and 10
- James Taylor – vocals on track 9
- Demo Morselli – trumpet on tracks 3, 4 and 11
- Daniele Comoglio – sax on 'tracks 3, 8 and 11
- Ambrogio Frigerio – trombone on tracks 3, 4, 6 and 11
- Giorgia – vocals on tracks 4 and 11
- Edoardo Vianello – vocals on track 11
- Naco – percussions on tracks 4, 6 and 8
- Enrico Ruggeri – vocals on track 5
- Vittorio Cosma – vocals and keyboards on track 12
- Aldo Baglio as Rolando – vocals on track 8
- Tenores di Neoneli – backing vocals on track 8
- Onofrio Cocco – backing vocals on track 8

== Album title and artwork ==
During the recording sessions, the album was meant to be called Eat the Khakis, as a reference to "La terra dei cachi". "Cachi" in Italian and "khaki" in English are pronounced the same, however, Vittorio Cosma warned the band that "khakis", outside of Italy, does not refer to the fruits (in fact, they are known as "persimmons" in English), but is instead a common nickname for military uniforms in general, due to their khaki color. Because of this, the band, who were still fond of titling the album after the name of a fruit including an H in it, chose "phikis" as a reference to another album track, "Burattino senza fichi". Later on, the concept of "making everything sweeter", which permeated the lyrics to "La terra dei cachi", extended itself to the cover artwork, where a still frame of a great white shark, taken from a TV wildlife documentary, was re-touched by graphic designer Alex Koban from Milan-based CGI studio Imagic; Koban "sweetened" the shark image by compositing oversized dental braces over its teeth. The artwork is inspired by the cover of the 1994 album Time to Move by H-Blockx.

== Charts ==
Chart (1996)	Peak position
Italian Albums (Musica e dischi)	1
