= Peerla =

Studio album by Elio e le Storie Tese
- Released: 1998
- Recorded: December 1997 – March 1998
- Genres: Rock, comedy rock
- Length: 68:37
- Labels: Aspirine; Sony BMG
- Producer: Otar Bolivecic

Elio e le Storie Tese chronology
| Del meglio del nostro meglio Vol. 1 (1997) | Peerla (1998) | Craccracriccrecr (1999) |

Peerla is a 1998 studio album by Italian rock band Elio e le Storie Tese, consisting of previously unreleased tracks, like the various opening themes for Italian television program Mai dire Gol, and studio outtakes. It was re-released in a digital version in 2000, with the additional track "Tenia".

In Milanese dialect, pirla is a mild insult meaning 'idiot', while perla is the Italian for 'pearl', which features on the album sleeve; the double entendre focuses on the English pronunciation of ⟨ee⟩ as opposed to the Italian ⟨e⟩.

== Songs ==
- "Introducing prof. Magneto" is a short dialogue starring Elio and guest "vocalist" Luca Mangoni, referencing X-Men villain Magneto but actually about magnets.
- "La donna nuda" (English: "The naked woman") is a parody/rewrite of "I Want a New Drug" by Huey Lewis and the News, with a new lyric about a naked woman who seduces passengers on a bus. The parodic remake, which, like all other covers by the band, was only performed live because Lewis never authorized it (and, indeed, the band never asked for any authorization), includes several references to "Ghostbusters" by Ray Parker Jr., already present in Lewis's original.
- "La cinica lotteria dei rigori" (English "The cynical lottery of penalty shootouts") – a typical expression of Italian sport journalists – was the closing credits theme for the 1995–1996 season of Mai dire Gol. It is about the elimination of Italy national football team from the final game in the 1994 FIFA World Cup after the penalty shootouts. The first part of the song features a football-themed parody of "Il testamento del Capitano" (English: "The captain's testament"), a traditional Alpini choral chant from World War I, quoting the three footballers who missed their penalties as fallen heroes and comparing the team's football field defeat to an utter defeat in war. The second part, completely different, is a 1930s pastiche sung by the band in close harmony in the style of The Andrews Sisters, but still with parodied lyrics from "Il testamento del Capitano" and other Alpini songs, and it ends with the title line, shouted out by guest "vocalist" Luca Mangoni.
- "Help me" is a live cover of a song by Dik Dik about an astronaut named McKenzie, who gets lost while travelling to Jupiter and fails to communicate with Earth, except for some faint cries of "Help me" followed by long silences. The otherwise serious, dramatic song is turned into comedy when the astronaut, played by Mangoni, responds with profanities to the sung chorus. In the last four lines, McKenzie's ship explodes and his wife tells his young son not to miss him, as he was not his real father, since she is a whore. These last lines are sung on a similar melody to Stefano Rosso's 1977 song "Una storia disonesta".
- "Nessuno allo stadio" (English: "Nobody at the stadium"), was the opening theme from 1994 Mai dire Mondiali – a special edition of Mai dire Gol dedicated to the 1994 World Cup – and it was originally released on a single. It is about the World Cup itself and the Americans' complete lack of interest in it. The lyrics mention Lorena Bobbitt's husband as someone who, for obvious reasons, cannot have even the least bit of interest in soccer, and Wilfred Agbonavbare, the goalkeeper from the Nigerian national team, as someone who may actually become famous as a result of the small amount of relevance given to the event. The song includes a musical and lyrical quote from Renato Carosone's 1956 USA-mocking satirical song "Tu Vuò Fà L'Americano" and two lines sampled from Aleandro Baldi's 1994 song "Passerà", who won the 1994 Sanremo Music Festival. Keyboard player Sergio Conforti (a.k.a. Rocco Tanica), who inserted the sample, named it as his favorite element in the song, and slightly manipulated it in order to obtain a similar effect to Annie Lennox's delayed voice singing "watch me walking / walking out the door-door-door-door-door..." toward the end of "Would I Lie to You?" by Eurythmics.
- "In te" (English: "Within you") focuses on abortion. It is a live recording of a cover of Nek's same-titled debut single from the same year. The song itself is absolutely identical in music, lyrics and arrangement to the original version. The comedic element is in the actual performance: the singer is Mangoni, who deliberately sings a full tone higher than the original version in order to sound even more strained than Nek.
- "Urna" is a live recording of the same-titled song from İtalyan, rum casusu çikti in a softer arrangement promoted by bassist Nicola Fasani (a.k.a. Faso). He had repeatedly vented his discontent with Elio's heavy metal arrangement on the previously released studio version.
- "Balla coi barlafüs" (English: "Dance with the morons"), the opening theme from the 1996–1997 season of Mai dire Gol, is a cover of Richard O'Brien's "Time Warp" from The Rocky Horror Show, with completely rewritten, satirical lyrics about Umberto Bossi and his failed attempt, in early 1996, to rally up a human chain from Polesine to Monviso in order to symbolically block the course of the river Po. The video is faithful to the corresponding scene in the 1975 film adaption of O'Brien's musical, here starring Elio as Riff Raff, Marina Massironi as Magenta and Giacomo Poretti of Aldo, Giovanni e Giacomo as the Criminologist/Narrator; the video also featured Daniele Luttazzi and Sabrina Ferilli as Brad and Janet and the rest of the cast from Mai dire Gol in various roles from the film.
- "Agnello medley" is identical to the same-titled track on The Los Sri Lanka Parakramabahu Brothers Featuring Elio e le Storie Tese. It is a medley of four Christmas songs (in order: "White Christmas", "Silent Night", "Tu scendi dalle stelle" and "Jingle Bells"), sung by Elio over an improvised and almost completely off-beat drum solo by drummer Christian Meyer, without any other instrumentation. Upon its original release, the medley was deemed "horrific" by fans.
- "Il concetto di banana", the opening theme from the 1995–1996 season of Mai dire Gol, is the original recording of "Lo stato A, lo stato B" from İtalyan, rum casusu çikti. It is a sarcastic comparison of good footballers ("champions") and bad ones ("bananas"), stating that the latter ones are bound to cause their teams' demise. The original opening theme ended with a sample of "St. Tropez twist" by Peppino di Capri, which was omitted from the CD version for copyright reasons.
- "Christmas with the Yours" is the same-titled song on the band's 1995 charity single.
- "Giocatore mondiale" (English: "World Cup footballer") is identical to the same-named song on The Los Sri Lanka Parakramabahu Brothers Featuring Elio e le Storie Tese. It is a satirical song about Italians' passion for football that cause them to forget all of the nation's problems (workplace accidents, homicides, architectural barriers, etc.). Three lines in the song are performed by wheelchair-using singer-songwriter Pierangelo Bertoli as a parody of his own involvement in a public service announcement about architectural barriers. The song includes the first four bars of "La Cucaracha" (played by Tanica as soon as the lyrics mention Luca Cordero di Montezemolo, here satirically referred to as "Luca di Montezuma"). The recording dates from 1989 and it was originally produced as the opening theme for Gialappa's Band's very first comedy show, on radio, titled Quasi Gol!.
- "Sabbiature" [literally "sandblasting", but here intended as insabbiature - "cover-ups"] is the first of two protest songs by the band on Peerla. "Sabbiature" is an incomplete live recording made during the band's set at the 1991 edition of Concerto del Primo Maggio [First of May Concert], a one-day music event organized by Italy's leading trade union CGIL. In its early editions, the Concert was a legitimate music festival event featuring short sets by very prominent Italian and international rock acts (Iron Maiden performed in its very first edition, in 1990); over the following years, it gradually turned into a showcase for exclusively Italian independent and politically committed acts, most of which had little or no relevance in Italy's musical panorama and were gaining short bursts of fame by, indeed, participating in the event. (This trend was later mocked by Elio e le Storie Tese in their 2013 song "Complesso del Primo Maggio", from L'album biango). In 1991, not-yet-star Elio and his band appeared in the event and ended their set with "Sabbiature", a completely improvised performance over an extremely simple two-chord backing track, essentially consisting of Elio delivering a very long list of wrongdoings and misgivings by politicians and other prominent figures at the time, most of which were either considered unimportant or totally overlooked by governmental bodies. RAI, the official broadcaster of the event, tried to censor the band by physically unplugging their onstage amplification and interrupting the performance with a cut to an outro by journalist Vincenzo Mollica, whose voice is featured on Peerla as cut-up samples. According to fans' recollections, Elio went on with an emergency microphone and no instrumentation for about one minute longer than the recording on Peerla, before leaving the stage as the audience was starting to boo him.
- "Ameri" and the following track, "Sunset Boulevard", are taken from the band's 1994 single "Nessuno allo stadio", released for that year's edition (set in the U.S.A.) of FIFA World Cup and named after track 5 on Peerla, also the main track on the single. "Ameri" is a parody/free rewrite of Toto Cutugno's 1990 song "Gli amori", which earned him the fourth of six second-place classifications in Sanremo Music Festival. Elio's parody lyrics target popular sport journalist and broadcaster Enrico Ameri, as well as Claudia Mori and Dori Ghezzi, claiming that the latter's profitable music career with Wess was cut short by Italy's racist attitude toward her black musical partner.
- "Sunset Boulevard" is a song about a retiring footballer who is repeatedly invited to "hang [his] boots", but he refuses to comply. Backing vocalist Daniela Rando and "Christmas with the Yours" star Graziano Romani are featured throughout, singing in the choruses and each getting one solo line. The song quotes one line from Riccardo Cocciante's 1980 hit "Cervo a primavera" and one from "Vedrai, vedrai" (1967) by Luigi Tenco.
- "Gli occhiali dell'amore" (English: "The glasses of love"), a live recording from 1990, is a parody of Mina's style (originally intended for her to sing), about an insecure boy who would need a pair of glasses to "see" his love for a girl he is fond of, later expanding the concept into a discussion about actual glasses.
- "Puliletti blues" (English: "Bed cleaner's blues") is an improvised 12-bar blues, recorded by Elio shortly before "Tapparella" (from Eat the Phikis). The lyrics are about a "poor man's" version of a blues song and about the structure of such a song, with Elio underlining that the song uses four chords instead of the traditional three.
- "Ti amo campionato", performed by the band live-in-the-studio during an episode of Mai dire Gol (in 1998), is very similar to "Sabbiature" in that both songs consist of improvised lyrics over an obsessively repeated, simplified backing track. Here, Elio focuses on wrongdoings (mostly corruption and referees' mistakes) in Italy's soccer championship, and the backing track is strongly reminiscent of Robert Miles's 1995 hit "Children".
- "Tenia" (English: "Taenia"), only included in the reprint of the album in 2000, is a live parody/rewrite of Michael Sembello's 1983 hit "Maniac", about the titular worm, the diseases caused by it and various way to get rid of it.

== Track listing ==
1. "Introducing prof. Magneto" – 0:26
2. "La donna nuda (I Want a New Drug)" – 3:40
3. "La cinica lotteria dei rigori" – 1:21
4. "Help Me" – 3:56
5. "Nessuno allo stadio" – 3:39
6. "In te" – 5:44
7. "Urna" – 3:46
8. "Balla coi barlafüs (Time Warp)" – 2:25
9. "Agnello Medley" – 2:48
10. "Il concetto di banana" – 1:20
11. "Christmas with the Yours" – 5:54
12. "Giocatore mondiale" – 5:11
13. "Sabbiature" – 5:40
14. "Ameri (Gli amori)" – 4:19
15. "Sunset Boulevard" – 3:50
16. "Gli occhiali dell'amore" – 2:39
17. "Puliletti Blues" – 5:05
18. "Ti amo campionato" – 6:44
19. "Tenia (Maniac)" – 3:45 (Note: Included only in the 2000 re-released version.)

== Personnel ==
- Stefano Belisari as Elio – lead vocals, flute, occasional bass
- Sergio Conforti as Rocco Tanica – keyboards
- Davide Civaschi as Cesareo – guitars
- Nicola Fasani as Faso – bass
- Paolo Panigada as Feiez – sax, guitar, keyboards, bass, backing vocals
- Christian Meyer – drums

Guest musicians

- Mangoni – vocals on track 6, backing vocals on tracks 2 and 4
- Curt Cress – drums on tracks 12 and 17
- Pierangelo Bertoli – vocals on track 12
- Giacomo Poretti – vocals on track 8
- Marina Massironi – vocals on track 8
- The Los Parakramabahu Brothers – vocals on track 9
- Naco – percussion on track 9
- Graziano Romani – lead vocals on track 11, additional lead and backing vocals on track 15
- Daniela Rando – additional lead and backing vocals on track 15
- Sandro De Bellis – African percussion on track 15
