= Officine Meccaniche (recording studio) =

Coordinates: 45°26′41″N 9°08′38″E

Officine Meccaniche (from 1962 to 1998 called Studi di registrazione sonora Regson) is a recording studio located in Milan, Italy. It was owned by Carlo e Umberto Zanibelli e Lidia Gualtieri from 1962 until 1998. Since then, it has been owned by Mauro Pagani, a long time violinist of Premiata Forneria Marconi.

== Albums recorded at the studio ==
- Giorgio Gaber
  - Il signor G (1970)
  - I borghesi (1971)
- Franco Battiato
  - Fetus (1972)
  - Pollution (1972)
  - Sulle corde di Aries (1973)
- Juri Camisasca
  - La finestra dentro (1974)
- Enzo Jannacci
  - Quelli che... (1975)
  - O vivere o ridere (1976)
- Gilda
  - Bolle di sapone (1976)
- Adriano Celentano
  - Yuppi du (1975)
  - Svalutation (1976)
  - Tecadisk (1977)
  - Ti avrò (1978)
- Léo Ferré
  - Il est six heures ici et midi à New York (1979)
  - La Violence et l'Ennui (1980)
  - L'Imaginaire (1982)
  - L'Opéra du pauvre (1983)
  - Les Loubards (1985)
  - On n'est pas sérieux quand on a dix-sept ans (1986)
  - Les Vieux Copains (1990)
  - Une saison en enfer (1991)
- New Trolls
  - Aldebaran (1978)
- Fabrizio Marzi
  - Zoo (1978)
- Amanda Lear
  - Tam-Tam (1983)
- Iva Zanicchi
  - Care colleghe (1987)
  - Nefertari (1988)
- Elio e le Storie Tese
  - Esco dal mio corpo e ho molta paura: Gli inediti 1979–1986 (1993)
  - Peerla (1998)
  - Cicciput (2003)
- De Sfroos
  - Manicomi (1995)
- Pierangelo Bertoli
  - Angoli di vita (1997)
- Massimo Ranieri
  - Oggi o dimane (2001)
  - Nun è acqua
- Francesco Baccini
  - Forza Francesco! (2001)
- PFM
  - Dracula Opera Rock (2005)
- Casino Royale
  - Reale (2001)
- Le Vibrazioni
  - Officine meccaniche (2006)
  - Le Strade del tempo (2010)
- Afterhours
  - Ballads for Little Hyenas (2006)
- Muse
  - Black Holes and Revelations (2006)
  - Drones (2015)
- Daniele Silvestri
  - Unò dué
  - Il latitante (2007)
- Verdena
  - Solo un grande sasso (2001)
  - Requiem (2007)
- Morgan
  - Da A ad A (teoria delle catastrofi) (2007)
- Marta sui tubi
  - Sushi & Coca (2008)
- Mokadelic
  - Come Dio comanda (2008)
- Beaucoup Fish
  - Lascio tutto (2009)
- Moltheni
  - Ingrediente novus (2009)
- Elisa
  - Heart (2009)
- Irene Fornaciari
  - Vintage Boy (2009)
- Domani 21/04.09 song recorded to raise money for the survivors of 2009 L'Aquila earthquake.
- Il Teatro degli Orrori
  - A sangue freddo (2009)
- Calibro 35
  - Ritornano quelli di... (2010)
- Corni Petar
  - Ruggine (2010)
- Tricarico
  - L'imbarazzo (2011)
- Giusy Ferreri
  - Il mio universo
- Vinicio Capossela
  - Marinai, profeti e balene (2011)
- Lady Gaga
  - Born This Way (2011)
- Lacuna Coil
  - Dark Adrenaline (2012)
  - Broken Crown Halo (2014)
