= Born to Be Abramo =

Single by Elio e le Storie Tese
- Released: July 1990
- Recorded: 1990
- Studio: Officine Meccaniche, Milan, Italy
- Genre: Comedy pop, disco
- Length: 4:56
- Label: Epic Records
- Songwriters: Nicola Fasani (as Faso), Domenico Machetta, Dino Verde, Domenico Modugno, Patrick Hernandez, Gigi Cocquio, James Wirrick, Sylvester
- Producer: Claudio Dentes (as Otar Bolivecic)

"Born to Be Abramo" is a disco medley/mashup by Italian comedy rock band Elio e le Storie Tese, originally released in 1990 as a 12" maxi-single.

As its title implies, part of it is a parody of Patrick Hernandez's 1978 disco hit "Born to Be Alive", featuring the lyrics to "Esci dalla tua terra" (translatable as "Walk out of your land"), a 1973 Christian pop worship song by missionary Gigi Cocquio, about Abraham. The medley also includes fragments from an older (1969) worship song, priest/musician Domenico Machetta's "Resta con noi, Signore, la sera" (translatable as "Abide with us, O Lord, in the evening"), mixed with "Resta cu'mme" ("Stay with me" in Neapolitan), a 1957 hit by Domenico Modugno, as well as the chorus from Sylvester's 1978 song "You Make Me Feel (Mighty Real)", again sung with lyrics from "Esci dalla tua terra". According to comments by the band within the CD booklet for the first pressing of their 1997 greatest hits compilation Del meglio del nostro meglio Vol. 1, the medley was meant to satirize the musical stiffness of Italian worship songs rather than the Catholic Church, as well as the possible dilution of Christian-themed messages through musically hackneyed, trivial songs, with band leader Elio jokingly stating that the Church would increase its popularity among younger generations of worshipers if Christian songs actually sounded the way the band performed them. (Note: Starting from the early 2000s, the Italian branch of Catholic charismatic renewal would unknowingly comply with Elio's statement, by introducing rock, dance and gospel elements into Italian Christian pop songs.)

As of 2024, the song is officially available only in a slightly different version, re-recorded by the band in 1997 as a duet with Hernandez, for Del meglio del nostro meglio Vol. 1; the original 1990 single was withdrawn within two months from its release, because the Italian branch of Jehovah's Witnesses took issues with its parodic cover artwork, and became a collector's item.

== The song ==
"Born to Be Abramo" consists of two separate parts, linked together by spoken word and keyboard/guitar interludes.

=== Introduction and first half ===
The song starts with a spoken introduction by the band's keyboard player Sergio Conforti (a.k.a. Rocco Tanica), acting out the role of a seminarian talking to a group of people from a small church community, reminding them that subscriptions for an upcoming chestnut-gathering trip to the fictional "Filzetta Valley" (named after a type of cured pork meat from Milan, but located somewhere within Southern Italy in the context of the song, according to Tanica's feigned Southern Italian dialectal accent) are being taken by "Father Egidio" in the parish, and warning "the usual smart alecks" that "no mass, no trip". A strummed acoustic guitar is heard while he finishes talking, but it is immediately interrupted by a four-on-the-floor bass drum and a sampled voice singing "Elio, Elio, E-E-E-E-E Elio (e le Storie Tese)" over a two-note melody. The voice belongs to producer Claudio Dentes's Filipino butler, known as "Tremoto", whose introduction for the band (in his own language) was used on their first album. (Note: The source for this sample is the phrase "Ellio e le Storrie Tese" (sic), taken from the very end of the first track ("Adolescenti a colloquio. Improvvisamente, Tremoto") on the band's first album; the track itself consist of a dialogue between two "teenagers", actually played by Elio and guitarist Cesareo, which gets interrupted by the butler's intervention.) The stuttering sample, which was devised by bassist Nicola Fasani (a.k.a. Faso) and reappears throughout the medley, gives way to a disco beat and a synth strings passage by Conforti, paraphrasing the intro to Renato Zero's 1978 disco hit "Triangolo". This is followed by Elio singing, alternately, a line from "Resta cu'mme" (in a disco arrangement originally created in 1976 for, and made famous by, Marcella Bella) followed by a line from "Resta con noi, Signore, la sera" and, in the second verse, quoting more extensively from both songs (namely, two lines from Machetta's song, followed by three lines from Modugno's – the third of which gets interrupted by a Machetta quote – and three more lines from Modugno). The section ends with a reprise of the "E-E-E-Elio" sample melody.

=== Second half ===
The second half starts with guitarist Davide Civaschi (a.k.a. Cesàreo) playing the guitar intro from "Born to Be Alive", over which Conforti (in the same voice as earlier) says: "Among other things, it is useless to rehearse the choir on Wednesday evening if on Sunday the only people singing are the usual three – sorry for using this word – morons!" Elio then sings (only) the lyrics to "Esci dalla tua terra" over the melody and the arrangement to "Born to Be Alive", thus creating a mashup which also includes the title phrase (obviously absent from Cocquio's song), parodied as "Born to be Abramo". The first two verses of both songs (Cocquio's lyrics over Hernandez's melody) are used in full, before Elio briefly deviates into two lines from "Esci dalla tua terra" using Cocquio's original melody. This is followed by the chorus lyrics to Cocquio's song ["Esci dalla tua terra e va' dove ti porterò" and "Parola di Jahvè", i.e. "Walk out of your land and go where I shall bring you" / "Jehovah's word"] (sung by multi-instrumentalist Paolo Panigada (a.k.a. Feiez) in a falsetto voice, in the style of Sylvester), over the chorus melody of "You Make Me Feel (Mighty Real)". After this, Panigada ends the song by continuing to sing Sylvester's melody using Cocquio's lyrics and adding some of his own, including a reference to "Bhagwan [i.e. Rajneesh], who's just died" (the Indian guru had indeed passed away less than one month before the band started recording the song). In the 1997 re-recording, the "who's just died" part was omitted and replaced with "or Sai Baba".

As a coda, Conforti talks again with no music (in the same role as above) and says the following: "And one last thing: those little 13/14-year-old ladies who come into the oratory all made-up like cabaret singers should know that this is neither the place nor the occasion to devote themselves to certain activities, because we are here to grow up, to become adults, to build a community and become one another's neighbor. All of us know that today's young people are vulnerable, when..." [fades out]. None of Conforti's spoken parts were included on the 1997 re-recording.

== B-side ==
The B-side to the original 12" single is another medley, consisting of the songs "World Class Player" and "John Holmes (Una vita per il cinema) [Shidzu version]".

=== "World Class Player" ===
"World Class Player" is a literal English translation (sung by Elio in his usually exaggerated, totally non-English Italian accent) of "Giocatore mondiale", the band's signature tune for Quasi gol ["Almost a goal"], a 1990 radio show by Gialappa's Band (the comedic trio's first recurring show, where they provided their own humorous commentary to football matches in the 1990 FIFA World Cup, complete with sampled voices and comical sound effects). The song is a satire of Italian "football mania" and features an intervention by singer-songwriter Pierangelo Bertoli, who sings three lines (in Italian) parodying his own involvement in an earlier public service announcement about architectural barriers. The Italian version of the song would later feature as a B-side on "Saturday Night Strage" (a house remix of "Born to Be Abramo") and reprinted in the CD release of the band's mini-album The Los Sri Lanka Parakramabahu Brothers Featuring Elio e le Storie Tese; this English version remained unreleased on CD. The lyrics were literally translated by Elio from Italian to English; as a result of this, in several occasions Elio is forced to speed up his delivery of the lyrics in order to stay within the original melody. At one point, he is heard swearing after he misses his cue on a chorus.

=== "John Holmes (Una vita per il cinema) [Shidzu version]" ===
The medley segues (without stopping) into the backing instrumental track from "John Holmes (Una vita per il cinema)" ["A life devoted to cinema"], a song from the band's Elio samaga hukapan kariyana turu album about the well-known American pornographic actor, overlaid with a Japanese song, performed by singer Ayako Handa and taken from a Noh play; the song itself is called "Ogi no Mato" (which translates to "The Folding Fan as a Target") (Note: According to a statement within the Blade Runner fan-managed resource website BRMovie.com, the lyrics to the original song are about the utter destruction of a clan by another.) and was also featured in the 1982 film Blade Runner as the soundtrack to a mock-Japanese advert – intended as a parody of an actual Japanese ad for a contraceptive pill. According to comments made by the band within their own radio show Cordialmente, on Radio Deejay, the combination was accidentally created in the studio: while producer Dentes and mixing engineer MC Costa were listening to a rough mix of the backing track to "John Holmes", sound engineer Maurizio Camagna loaded a Japanese theatre CD on a player and pressed "Play" without having any idea about what Dentes and Costa were doing. The Japanese song ended up being fed into the console, and the result cracked up Dentes, Costa and the band so much that they decided to release it the way it was, as a bonus track on the album's CD release, titled "John Holmes [Shidzu version]". As a result of the coupling, the copyright notes within YouTube on some videos for "Ogi no Mato" incorrectly list the song title as "John Holmes (Una vita per il cinema)"; the artist credit, in the same notes, is equally misattributed to Elio e le Storie Tese (instead of Ayako Handa / Ensemble Nipponia) and the copyright holder is mistakenly shown as Sony Music.

== Artwork controversy and withdrawal ==
Before recording the single, the band did not ask permission from any of the involved songwriters to use their material, but most of them were not concerned at all, except for "Resta cu'mme" lyricist Dino Verde, who did not like the religious associations brought by the band to his lyrics and accused them of outright thievery of other people's work. On the other hand, Gigi Cocquio appreciated the band's parody of his song and complimented them. However, the Italian branch of Jehovah's Witnesses were irritated by the artwork for the single, a parodic remake of a cover picture from Svegliatevi!, the Italian edition of Awake!; the remake consisted in a doctored rendition of an actual cover from the magazine, with the headline "What Chances are There for a Longer Life?" and a picture of an elderly lady holding an infant baby in her arms – but the baby's head had been replaced by Pelé's head, with surreally yellow hair. The artwork also featured the nonsense heading Sveliatevi!, omitting the G from the original heading in order to include the O of the name "elio" (all in lowercase) within the lowercase A. The Witnesses complained that the band had completely misunderstood their message, while in fact they did not care at all about "the message": the artwork was, indeed, intended to mock the perceived silliness of that particular cover picture, rather than the movement itself. As a result of the Witnesses' complaint, the single was withdrawn from sales within less than two months from its release, it was never reprinted and became a collector's item.

The back cover is an anonymous Bible illustration in the style of Gustave Doré, depicting Abraham, five other men (one of which, on the far right, is only partly seen because of the way the picture is cropped), a crowd in the background and a football, added in by means of CGI. The first of two captions next to a small outline drawing, below the main picture, correctly identifies Abraham as the figure on the far left, but the second one jokingly refers to the other five men (plus a single man in the crowd) as members of Elio e le Storie Tese.
