= Gattini =

L'album biango

Compilation album by Elio e le Storie Tese
- Released: October 30, 2013
- Genre: Comedy rock
- Length: 68:55
- Label: Hukapan; Sony Music

Elio e le Storie Tese chronology
Studentessi (2008)	L'album biango (2013)	L'album biango (2013)

Gattini – Selezione orchestrale di classici nostri belli is a compilation album by Italian rock band Elio e le Storie Tese, published in 2009.

It features orchestral versions of previous songs and unpublished one, "Storia di un bellimbusto".

The CD has been released together with a DVD featuring the making of "Gattini" and "Storia di un bellimbusto" and the videoclip of the latter.

== Track listing ==
1. "Gattini" – 0:33
2. "John Holmes (Una vita per il cinema)" – 3:54
3. "Cassonetto differenziato per il frutto del peccato" – 4:08
4. "Nella vecchia azienda agricola" – 1:14
5. "Pork & Cindy" – 5:00
6. "Il vitello dai piedi di balsa" – 3:14
7. "Il vitello dai piedi di balsa (reprise)" – 1:33
8. "Uomini col borsello (Ragazza che limoni sola)" – 4:29
9. "Essere donna oggi" – 7:18
10. "La terra dei cachi" – 4:09
11. "Psichedelia" – 4:19
12. "Il rock and roll" – 5:41
13. "La follia della donna (Parte I)" – 3:35
14. "Shpalman®" – 3:33
15. "Largo al factotum" – 4:53
16. "Storia di un bellimbusto" – 5:25
17. "Shpalman® (Romanza da salotto)" – 5:54

== Charts ==
Chart (2009)	Peak position
Italian Albums (FIMI)	8
