= Made in Japan (Live at Parco Capello) =

Live album by Elio e le Storie Tese
- Released: 2001
- Recorded: Palermo, Rome, Florence, Bologna, Modena, Milan and Bergamo between 1996 and 1999
- Genre: Comedy rock
- Length: 104:06
- Label: Aspirine; Sony BMG
- Producer: Otar Bolivecic

Elio e le Storie Tese chronology
Tutti gli uomini del deficiente (1999)	Made in Japan (Live at Parco Capello) (2001)	Cicciput (2003)

Made in Japan (Live at Parco Capello) is the first live album by Italian rock group Elio e le Storie Tese.

It shows a reference to the famous Deep Purple live album Made in Japan both in its title and graphics.

The titles of the two CDs refer to phrases commonly heard at box offices from people trying to get in for free: Dovrebbero esserci due accrediti (English: "There should be two complimentary tickets") and Può guardare sotto Fabio? (English: "Can you look under Fabio?").

== Track listing ==
=== Side One: Dovrebbero esserci due accrediti ===
1. "Me l'ha detto Michele" – 1:16
2. "Cassonetto differenziato per il frutto del peccato" – 4:36
3. "Uomini col borsello (Ragazza che limoni sola)" – 5:41
4. "Ocio ocio" – 3:47
5. "Né carne né pesce" – 6:08
6. "Servi della gleba" – 8:44
7. "Il vitello dai piedi di balsa" – 3:31
8. "Il vitello dai piedi di balsa (reprise)" – 1:27
9. "Paolo pum, Christian chock" – 2:52
10. "El Pube" – 6:02
11. "La terra dei cachi" – 7:14

=== Side Two: Può guardare sotto Fabio? ===
1. "Quando si parla di capitalismo, tutti hanno paura dell'armonica" – 0:57
2. "Lo stato A, lo stato B" – 4:35
3. "Abbecedario" – 3:08
4. "John Holmes (una vita per il cinema)" – 4:22
5. "Milza" – 3:48
6. "Cara ti amo (Risvolti psicologici nei rapporti fra giovani uomini e giovani donne)" – 7:10
7. "Il mondo di Paul Branigade" – 2:27
8. "Essere donna oggi" – 5:08
9. "Supergiovane" – 8:17
10. "Zooma zooma baccalà" – 2:22
11. "Tapparella" – 10:22

== Personnel ==
- Elio – vocals, transverse flute
- Rocco Tanica – keyboards, vocals, backing vocals
- Cesareo – lead guitar, backing vocals
- Faso – bass guitar, backing vocals
- Christian Meyer – drums, percussions
- Feiez – saxophone, vocals, percussions, bass, guitar, keyboards
- Luca Mangoni – choreographies
- Jantoman – keyboards

== Charts ==
Chart (2001)	Peak position
Italian Albums (FIMI)	23
