= Esco dal mio corpo e ho molta paura: Gli inediti 1979–1986 =

Studio album / live album by Elio e le Storie Tese
- Released: November 1993
- Recorded: October 1993
- Studio: Regson Studio, Milan, Italy
- Genre: Comedy rock
- Length: 70:55
- Label: Hukapan; Sony Music
- Producer: Jualin

Elio e le Storie Tese chronology
İtalyan, rum casusu çikti (1992)	Esco dal mio corpo e ho molta paura: Gli inediti 1979–1986 (1993)	Eat the Phikis (1996)

Esco dal mio corpo e ho molta paura: Gli inediti 1979–1986 (Note: The title can be translated as "I come out of my body and I am very scared: The unreleased songs 1979–1986". It is a jocular reference to an out-of-body experience, as quoted in the 1970s–early 1980s Italian astrology magazine Astra.) is the third album by Italian rock band Elio e le Storie Tese.

It is a "fake" live album (actually recorded live, but in a recording studio in Milan with an audience made up of the band's relatives and friends) featuring many songs written and performed by the band during their early pre-fame phase, in the 1980s, which were not included on the previous records.

== Background ==
The album was recorded as a response to demands by early fans of the band: after they had become well known on the Italian alternative rock scene following the relative chart success of their first two albums, they were constantly being asked by fans to play old songs when they performed in clubs, but they rarely complied. The band stated that the album was a way for them to get rid of a number of old, unreleased songs by actually releasing them, so they could record and release newer ones. However, "Alfieri", a common closer of early shows and a fan favourite, is absent from the record. A number of cover versions with parodied lyrics were also not featured, because of copyright reasons.

== Songs ==
- "Ùnanimi" (English "Unanimous", but with a deliberately wrong accent on the first U) is an a cappella performance by the band, where all of them (including drummer Christian Meyer), singing in unison and clapping their hands, state that they agree on everything except swearing; indeed, when they actually arrive to their favourite vulgarities, everyone says his own. The lyrics feature a reference to "Alfieri" in the line "Siam gli alfieri dell'impero Sbor" (English: "We are the ensigns of the Sbor empire"), where "Sbor" is both the Czech word for "choir" and a pun on the mildly vulgar Italian slang term for cum, which also reappears in the following verse. The ending sounds similar to Wolfgang Amadeus Mozart's opera The Marriage of Figaro.

=== Derived song ===
In 2000, seven years after the release of this collection, the band used the same melody as "Ùnanimi", with different lyrics, for the verses on their dance/pop single "La gente vuole il gol" (English: "People want the goal"), which was released as a promotional freebie with the June 23, 2000 issue of the Italian satirical magazine Cuore. For the choruses of the song, intended as an ironical "unofficial theme" for the UEFA Euro 2000 soccer championship, Elio used a variation of Baroque composer Marc-Antoine Charpentier's famous Marche en Rondeau, from his Te Deum, which is still used today as a fanfare during television broadcasts of the Eurovision Network and the European Broadcasting Union. Elio rewrote the theme in a slightly anthemic style, but still within the main dance style of the song.

- Taking its cue from the opening line of Catherine Spaak's 1964 song "L'esercito del surf", "Noi siamo i giovani" (English: "We are the youngsters") is a 1960s parody concerning youth culture and specifically about boys getting orchitis as a result of wearing their jeans too tight. According to Elio's spoken intro, this song features gezz lyrics (a pun on the Italian phonetic spelling of jazz), i.e. completely improvised.
- "Catalogna" is a rock/hard rock song; the lyrics are about cicoria di catalogna intended as the actual vegetable, but also as a sex enhancer and sex toy. The concluding lines are set to a waltz beat and include a vague musical reference to the theme from Popeye the Sailor. Mike Francis guests on backing vocals.
- "Abbecedario" (English: "Alphabet schoolbook") is the band's first officially released song, on a 1985 compilation entitled Musica metropolitana. The lyrics, although they are superficially about a salesman of laminated plastic materials, are mostly nonsensical, including a number of malapropisms and unconnected sentences.
- "Cadavere spaziale" (English: "Space corpse") is the first of the band's recurring live performances of cover versions played very straight and with virtually no changes from the original versions. In this case, it is a cover of the same-titled novelty song from 1964, performed here by its original singer Riz Samaritano. The song, which has nothing to do with space, is about a man who, after a heavy meal in a restaurant, dreams about a horribly disfigured criminal who was killed with two gunshots in his heart and seven nails hammered into his hand; the narrator also tells about pushing the murdered man into a coffin, where he did not fit, and refers to him as a "space corpse".
- "Zelig: la cunesiùn del pulpacc" ("The linking of the calf muscle" in Milanese), is a mock-folk song, sung in the dialect of Milan and dedicated to Giancarlo Bozzo, founder and co-owner of the historical Zelig comedy club, where the band had its debut; Bozzo is nicknamed "link" and "calf muscle" because of the apparently abnormal dimensions of his sex organs. The song, whose lyrics are about the club (ironically mentioning drug addicts, gays and people with AIDS as perpetual outcasts from it), was originally conceived as a theme tune for the club itself, but the band was out-voted for it against Bruno Lauzi. All of the band members are featured on this track on different instruments than their usual ones: Tanica plays acoustic guitar, guitarist Davide Civaschi (a.k.a. Cesàreo) plays the transverse flute (normally Elio's instrument), bassist Nicola Fasani (a.k.a. Faso) plays the alto saxophone. Elio himself forgets some of the words.
- "La saga di Addolorato" (English: "Addolorato's saga"), consistently with its title, is a long (Note: The stated duration in the booklet is 9:58, but the song is actually even longer, clocking in at 10:01.) blues song, most of which is a parody of James Taylor's "Steamroller Blues". In the spoken intro, Elio describes the lyrics to the song as another example of gezz lyrics. The song tells the "sad" story of a ten-brothers family whose youngest offspring, named Addolorato (literally "sorrowful" and normally used in Italy in its feminine form, addolorata, as a reference to Our Lady of Sorrows), is bullied and ostracized by his nine brothers – all with names ending in "-ino" – whose idea of fun is ass-fucking him regularly. In the third and last section, Addolorato takes revenge on his family by copulating with girls on the beach, while his brothers, who have been playing among themselves all the time and systematically ignoring him, end up masturbating.
- "Cavo" (English: "Cable") is a parody of a love song, sung passionately in the style of a serenade, where a wannabe electric guitarist (Elio) would like to pursue a girl by playing his guitar for her, but he is frustrated by the defective cable on his guitar, which keeps getting unwelded; in the chorus, he implores the cable itself not to come undone and he ironically states that he is as good as 1970s Israelite illusionist/impostor Uri Geller, were it not for the cable. The song is introduced by Elio as "Cavo della mia chitarra" (English: "Cable of my guitar"), a parody of Claudio Villa's 1957 romantic song "Corde della mia chitarra" (English: "Strings on my guitar").
- "La ditta" (English: "The firm") is a jazz parody, where a very relaxed swing mood is completely overturned by a deliberately vulgar, scurrilous lyric about shit, also including several references to coprophagia, associating it with the band members. Some fans also interpreted the lyrics, especially the "firm" reference in the title, as a pointed satirical reference to the Italian discographic industry; this, however, has never been proved.
- "Ocio ocio" ("Beware beware" in Milanese, literally "eye eye") is a punk rock song with reggae interludes, partly based on the riff from "Burn" by Deep Purple. Its lyrics are a general warning against the dangers of excessive wealth, also paraphrasing the sentence "it is easier for a camel to go through the eye of a needle than for a rich man to enter the kingdom of God" from the Gospel of Matthew.
- "You" is another ballad parody, built on the melody of Johann Sebastian Bach's famous "Air" from his Third Orchestral Suite, which at the time was already very popular in Italy due to its use by Piero Angela as the credits tune for his long-running TV science magazine Quark. (In Elio's spoken intro for the song, Elio states that the melody was written especially for the band by an obscure composer named "Bacchi".) The song is performed as a duet by Elio and Tanica and features two verses in simplified English and two more in Italian, degenerating into nonsense at the end with a mention of the following song on the album, "Aü". Also according to Elio's spoken intro, it was inspired by his and Tanica's shared belief, during their first meeting, that both of them were gay (whereas none of them were); the singer also states that their extremely short-lived "romantic relationship" lasted only one day, after which they wrote the song.
- "Aü" is a very short (Note: Similarly to "Addolorato", the song, with a playing time of only 0:47, is even shorter than its stated duration in the booklet (1:06).) song based on a repeated vocoded sample of the titular nonsense word, after which Elio and Cesàreo, using an exaggerated and fake American accent, sing a reference to "Mandingo, the secret of porn stars", a 1970s ointment sold as a sex enhancer, but later revealed to be fake as it consisted of a chili pepper-based pomade.
- "Faro" (English: "Lighthouse") juxtaposes a sentimental ballad about two people falling in love on a beach near a lighthouse and a punk rock chorus only consisting of the repeated lyric "Ma vaffanculo" (i.e. "Just fuck off"). It is freely paraphrased from Daniele Pace's 1979 song "Vaffanculo", which featured a very similar structure.
- "(Gomito a gomito con l') Aborto" (English: "Shoulder-to-shoulder with Abortion", literally "Elbow-to-elbow") is a sentimental ballad in the style of late 1960s-1970s pop band I Camaleonti, whose singer Antonio "Tonino" Cripezzi duets with Elio on this track. The lyrics, freely referencing the 1981 Italian anti-abortion referendum are about a personification of abortion, seen as a friend rather than somebody/something to be scared of. The song includes overt quotes from Armando Trovajoli's 1962 song "Roma nun fa' la stupida stasera" (English: "Rome, don't be silly tonight") and from Antonello Venditti's 1972 song "Roma capoccia" (English: "Rome, the boss"), as well as a passing reference to "Amico" (1978) by Renato Zero.
- The title of "Né carne né pesce" (English: "Neither meat nor fish") is a reference to the Italian idiomatic expression meaning not having defined characteristics, similar to English expression "neither fish nor fowl", used in the song as a metaphor for an indecisive person. In the song, multi-instrumentalist Paolo Panigada (a.k.a. Feiez), who died in 1998, sings a verse in English, mostly a literal translation of Elio's lyrics.
- "Sono Felice" ("I am Felice", but literally "I am happy") is a parody of Milva's same-titled song from 1990, written by Ron, which is about an unhappy lovelorn woman, despised by her partner, who ironically declares she is very happy. Elio's lyrics, instead, are about bicycle racer Felice Gimondi, described as being tired and frustrated by his long-standing rivalry with Eddy Merckx.
- "Amico uligano" ("Hooligan friend", in Italian phonetic spelling), the very first theme tune (1992) produced by the band for Gialappa's Band's soccer-themed satire TV show Mai dire Gol, is about hooligans; Elio addresses a young hooligan (defined as a "man-child") and invites him to change his violent ways before incurring in something bad, namely, death or imprisonment. The song includes a number of musical quotes: a tune from "Firenze Santa Maria Novella" by Pupo, a brass passage mirroring the theme tune from 90º minuto, a line from "Eppur mi son scordato di te" by Lucio Battisti, and a lyrical quote from the Italian theme tune to the cartoon series Dennis the Menace, sung in Italy by voice actress Paola Tovaglia. Soul singer Alex Baroni, who also died shortly after the release of the album, guests here on backing vocals.
- The album closer, "Ho molta paura" (English: "I am very scared"), is a medley of short excerpts of various old songs, either ones included on the album or absent from it. The song ends with two different voicemails, played simultaneously on the two stereo channels, received on an answering machine by keyboard player Sergio Conforti (a.k.a. Rocco Tanica). In the messages, an anonymous elderly lady from Milan, apparently mistaking Tanica for the band's lead singer, angrily insults him for the profane content of the band's songs, accusing him (among other things) of having mentally corrupted her son. Tanica, who nicknamed the lady "Nasty Sciura" ("Sciura" being Milanese for "madam"), originally played the messages during various episodes of the band's early comedy show Telekommando, on the Italian MTV-analogue TV channel Videomusic. The "Nasty Sciura" nickname was originally meant to be written "Nasty Shura", but Tanica decided to change it to "Sciura" (as in the original Milanese dialect) after he had found out that "shura" and the Arabic term sura, referring to a religious story within the Quran, were pronounced the same. He made the change to save himself from any possible trouble which may have derived from the reference.

== Track listing ==
1. "Ùnanimi" – 1:21
2. "Noi siamo i giovani (con i blue jeans)" – 3:00
3. "Catalogna" – 3:06
4. "Abbecedario" – 3:22
5. "Cadavere spaziale" – 4:13
6. "Zelig: la cunesiùn del pulpacc" – 3:35
7. "La saga di Addolorato" – 9:56
8. "Cavo" – 3:57
9. "La ditta" – 2:08
10. "Ocio ocio" – 4:21
11. "You" – 2:41
12. "Aü" – 1:06
13. "Faro" – 3:48
14. "(Gomito a gomito con l') Aborto" – 3:58
15. "Né carne né pesce" – 7:44
16. "Sono Felice" – 4:41
17. "Amico uligano" – 4:14
18. "Ho molta paura" – 3:34

== Album artwork ==
The front cover of the album is a reference to the band's early days, when Tanica promoted the band's gigs through self-made posters in which he replaced the band members' heads with porn stars. Here, the band members' then-current faces were pasted in the same way (but by means of CGI) over the bodies of Tanica's family in a very old (1970s) family photo shot in their garden – except for Feiez, whose adult face was pasted over an ugly-looking childhood photo of him.

== Personnel ==
- Stefano Belisari as Elio – vocals
- Sergio Conforti as Rocco Tanica – piano, keyboards
- Davide Civaschi as Cesàreo – electric guitar
- Nicola Fasani as Faso – bass
- Paolo Panigada as Feiez – sax, guitar, keyboards, vocals
- Christian Meyer as Tupi "Turtello Christianmeyer" Hermannmeyer – drums

Guest musicians

- Riz Samaritano – vocals on track 5
- Antonio Cripezzi – vocals on track 14
- Amedeo "Demo" Morselli – trumpet on tracks 7, 9, 14 and 15
- Daniele Comoglio & Davide Ghidoni – sax and trumpet on tracks 9 and 17
- Letizia Hermann – sax on track 9
- Roberto Vernetti – keyboards
- Mike Francis – backing vocals on track 3
- Alex Baroni – backing vocals on tracks 4 and 17
