= Craccracriccrecr =

Studio album by Elio e le Storie Tese
- Released: May 17, 1999
- Genre: Pop, rock, comedy rock
- Length: 63:42
- Label: Aspirine Music

Elio e le Storie Tese chronology
Peerla (1998)	Craccracriccrecr (1999)	Tutti gli uomini del deficiente (1999)

Craccracriccrecr is a 1999 studio album by Italian rock band Elio e le Storie Tese. It is the first album by the band after the death of long-time member Feiez, who died in 1998.

== Track listing ==
1. "Craccracriccracker" – 0:30
2. "Evviva" – 1:07
3. "La visione" – 3:50
4. "Il Rock and Roll" – 7:42
5. "La bella canzone di una volta" – 3:31
6. "Che felicità" – 3:01
7. "Farmacista" – 3:59
8. "Bobbi Burrs (Baby Birds)" – 3:09
9. "Nudo e senza cacchio" – 4:05
10. "Mustasì" – 3:05
11. "Beatles, Rolling Stones e Bob Dylan" – 2:42
12. "Caro 2000" – 4:11
13. "Bacio" – 3:25
14. "Sogno o son desktop" – 4:05
15. "Discomusic" – 5:08
16. "Bis" – 4:32

== Personnel ==
- Stefano Belisari as Elio - vocals
- Sergio Conforti as Rocco Tanica - keyboards
- Davide Civaschi as Cesareo - guitars
- Nicola Fasani as Faso - bass
- Christian Meyer - drums

Guest musicians

- Feiez - sax solo on track 1, vocals and banjo on track 8, tambourine and cocktail shaker on track 15
- Elena Belfiore - vocals on track 4
- Daniele Comoglio - sax on tracks 2, 5, 6, 12, 14 and 15
- Vittorio Cosma - keyboards, backing vocals
- Mangoni - rapping on track 3
- Simone Alberghini - vocals on tracks 4 and 7
- Massimiliano Gagliardo - vocals on track 4 and 7
- Elena Rossi - vocals on track 4 and 7
- Stefano Bollani - vocals on track 5
- Max Costa - drums on track 5
- Demo Morselli - trumpet on tracks 5, 12 and 15
- Ambrogio Frigerio - trombone on tracks 5, 12, 15
- Giorgio Bracardi - vocals on track 6
- Trio di Piadeena - background vocals on track 6
- Paolo Costa - bass on tracks 7 and 11
- Zuffellato - claps on track 11
- Curt Cress - drums on track 15

== Charts ==
Chart (1999)	Peak position
Italian Albums (FIMI)	3
