= Elio samaga hukapan kariyana turu =

Studio album by Elio e le Storie Tese
- Released: December 1989
- Recorded: September 1989
- Genre: Comedy rock, alternative rock, progressive rock
- Length: 49:10
- Label: Psycho; CBS
- Producer: Otar Bolivecic

Elio e le Storie Tese chronology
Elio samaga hukapan kariyana turu (1989)	The Los Sri Lanka Parakramabahu Brothers Featuring Elio e le Storie Tese (1990)

Elio samaga hukapan kariyana turu is the first album by Italian rock band Elio e le Storie Tese.

The album title is in Sinhalese language, and it means "Let's cum and fart with Elio".

Most of the songs featured in this record were written during the band's early years before the album's release and were often performed during the 1980s.

In 2012, the album has been ranked the 15th best Italian album of all time by the magazine Rolling Stone.

== Title ==
During an online interview about vulgar words and swearing in Elio e le Storie Tese's songs, keyboardist Rocco Tanica explained that the title of the album originated with a young Sri Lankan man living in Milan; wanting an incomprehensible title for the band's debut album, Tanica asked the man to say the most vulgar sentence in Sinhalese, and to include the name "Elio" within it. The man found it hard to respond properly due to the gentle and almost poetical nature of his native tongue (Note: According to the band's pianist Rocco Tanica, a very literal (non-slang, non-vulgar) translation of the title is "Let's emit the vital fluid and let's expel excessive air in Elio's company".), but he finally replied with the title sentence, which, according to other Sri Lankan people contacted by Tanica, may also be translated as "Let's fart and cum with Elio" or "Let's blow (air) and piss with Elio". In the same interview, Tanica also explained that a variant of the phrase with "kokapan" instead of "hukapan" exists in Sri Lankan street slang, and the former is perceived as much more vulgar as it refers to homosexual sex between two men.

== Track listing ==
CD edition
No.	Title	Length
1.	"Adolescenti a colloquio. Improvvisamente, Tremoto"	1:09
2.	"John Holmes (Una vita per il cinema)"	3:29
3.	"Domande bizzarre"	0:39
4.	"Nubi di ieri sul nostro domani odierno (Abitudinario)"	4:13
5.	"According the Memphis Horns"	0:27
6.	"Carro"	4:45
7.	"Una gita a..."	0:10
8.	"The Fabolous '68s According to Tony Martucci"	0:41
9.	"Nella vecchia azienda agricola"	1:29
10.	"Silos"	5:18
11.	"Cassonetto differenziato per il frutto del peccato"	4:04
12.	"Introducing the Real Parakramabahu According to Shantha Edirisinghe"	0:25
13.	"Parakramabahu Rajatuma"	0:48
14.	"Piattaforma"	3:29
15.	"Suspense! Il signor Brando Meets Marlon Brando"	0:17
16.	"Introducing the Cara ti amo"	2:33
17.	"Cara ti amo (Risvolti psicologici nei rapporti tra giovani uomini e giovani donne)"	4:22
18.	"Messaggio satanico"	0:38
19.	"Cateto"	5:29
20.	"Spuma da 100"	0:40
21.	"John Holmes (Shidzu Version)"	3:38
22.	"Ang ang ang"	0:21
Total length:		49:10

Vinyl edition
No.	Title	Length
1.	"John Holmes (Una Vita Per Il Cinema)"	3:29
2.	"Nubi Di Ieri Sul Nostro Domani Odierno (Abitudinario)"	4:13
3.	"Carro"	4:45
4.	"Nella Vecchia Azienda Agricola"	1:29
5.	"Silos"	5:18
6.	"Cassonetto Differenziato Per Il Frutto Del Peccato"	4:04
7.	"ParaKramabahu Rajatuma"	0:48
8.	"Piattaforma"	3:29
9.	"Cara Ti Amo (Risvolti Psicologici Nei Rapporti Fra Giovani Uomini E Giovani Donne)"	4:22
10.	"Cateto"	5:29
Total length:		37:26

Cassette edition
No.	Title	Length
11.	"John Holmes (Una Vita Per Il Cinema) (Shidzu Version)"	3:38
Total length:		41:04

== Personnel ==
- Stefano Belisari as Elio – vocals
- Sergio Conforti as Confo Tanica – piano
- Davide Civaschi as Civas – electric guitar
- Nicola Fasani as Faso – bass
- Paolo Panigada as Mu Fogliasch – sax
- Curt Cress – drums

== Allusions ==
The album contains several references to popular culture and youth culture from the 1970s and early 1980s, in particular to other music productions.

- The first track, "Adolescenti a colloquio. Improvvisamente, Tremoto", quotes the song "Eptadone" in the album MONOtono by Skiantos, as it features Elio's and Cesareo's voices electronically sped up to sound like teenage secondary school students. It also features Rockets' hit "On the Road Again" playing in background, and quotes former Italian football player Giacinto Facchetti.
- "John Holmes" is dedicated to the eponymous pornographic actor.
- "According the Memphis Horns" is a soundcheck by The Memphis Horns.
- "Carro" is introduced by a line from "Back in the U.S.S.R." by The Beatles and contains quotes from the German national anthem. It also includes a self-reference (or a self-quote) in the form of a slightly slowed-down and recurring sample of Elio's voice singing "...rri". This sample, as revealed by keyboard player Sergio Conforti (a.k.a. Rocco Tanica), comes from a later track on the album, "Piattaforma" (described below), where Elio sings the word "corri" (in English: "Run!"); during the mixing sessions, Elio and Tanica were listening to a rough mix of "Piattaforma", but the tape machine happened to have a slow starting mechanism, so, when they started it on the line ending with "corri", the machine only played "...rri", while the other half of the word was garbled and unhearable. Tanica liked the funny quality of the fragment so much that he kept using it again and again on several other songs - for example, it appears all the way through their 1990 single "Born to Be Abramo" and it recurs within "Pipppero", a hit single from the band's following album İtalyan, rum casusu çikti.
- "Nella vecchia azienda agricola" is a parody of Nella vecchia fattoria, the Italian version of "Old MacDonald Had a Farm".
- "Cassonetto differenziato per il frutto del peccato" includes several quotations from Italian pop songs, such as Lucio Battisti's "I giardini di marzo", as well as a sample from Lou Reed's "The Kids".The lyrics are a satire on Unwanted pregnancy issues in young women, with Elio mentioning the abandonment of newborn babies into dumpsters; the title literally translates to "Separated waste container for the fruit of sin".
- "Piattaforma" is inspired by "Je t'aime... moi non plus" by Jane Birkin and Serge Gainsbourg. However, the structure of the song, which features a phone call from a child (played by voice actress Paola Tovaglia) talking about complex mechanical procedures on an oil platform to a man (Elio), who is revealed as the child's father only at the very end, is similar to Domenico Modugno's 1975 song "Piange... il telefono" (literally "The telephone is crying", but also translatable "Tears on the telephone"), where a little girl talks on the phone with a heartbroken man, without realizing he is actually her father. Also, according to Rocco Tanica's analysis of the song, some lines in the lyrics imply a romantic or affectionate relationship between the two characters - with the final disclosure of their parental link making the relationship itself slightly incestuous.
- Track 15, "Suspense! Mr. Brando meets Marlon Brando", a short spoken interlude, is a reference to La Settimana Enigmistica. "Suspense!", a recurring feature, consists of a short text detailing a curious and apparently unexplainable event which happened to a man named Mr. Brando; the reader is invited to find the only possible logical explanation to the event. Two more short interludes on the album, "Domande bizzarre" (English: "Weird questions") and "Una gita a..." ("A trip to..."), are also named after fixed features on the magazine.
- In "Messaggio satanico" (in English "Satanic Message"), Black Sabbath are quoted. After a short speech, the song goes into an off-key rendition of Happy Birthday to You, deliberately recorded backwards. It is intended as a mockery of a 1980s trend by heavy metal and hard rock bands to include actual backmasked Satanic-themed messages and invocations on their albums, but also of the habit to look for backmasked messages even where there are actually none, as a possible further reference to "Empty Spaces" by Pink Floyd; Black Sabbath themselves, despite their lyrical themes, never used such messages.
