= Studentessi =

Studio album by Elio e le Storie Tese
- Released: 2008
- Genre: Comedy rock, pop rock, progressive rock
- Length: 78:22
- Label: Hukapan
- Producer: Elio e le Storie Tese; MC Costa

Elio e le Storie Tese chronology
Il meglio di Grazie per la splendida serata (2005)	Studentessi (2008)	Gattini (2009)

Studentessi is a 2008 studio album by Italian rock band Elio e le Storie Tese.

== Track listing ==
1. "Studentessi" – 0:46
2. "Plafone" (feat. Antonella Ruggiero) – 5:00
3. "Ignudi fra i nudisti" (feat. Giorgia) – 4:34
4. "Tristezza" – 4:32
5. "Effetto memoria [Inverno]"– 1:01
6. "Heavy Samba" (feat. Irene Grandi) – 6:51
7. "Gargaroz" – 5:45
8. "Suicidio a sorpresa: Allegro" (feat. Paola Cortellesi) – 1:27
9. "Suicidio a sorpresa: Allegretto" (feat. Paola Cortellesi) – 1:01
10. "Suicidio a sorpresa: Andante con moto" – 1:19
11. "Suicidio a sorpresa: Allegro" (feat. Paola Cortellesi) – 0:19
12. "Suicidio a sorpresa: Allegretto" (feat. Paola Cortellesi) – 1:52
13. "Effetto memoria [Primavera]" – 1:31
14. "La lega dell'amore" (feat. Claudio Bisio) – 4:26
15. "Indiani (A caval donando)" – 5:51
16. "Effetto memoria [Estate]" (feat. Claudio Baglioni) – 0:47
17. "Supermassiccio" – 5:52
18. "La risposta dell'architetto" – 4:43
19. "Parco sempione" – 4:58
20. "Il Congresso delle parti molli" – 7:04
21. "Single" (feat. Luigi Piloni [alias Feiez]) – 3:22
22. "Effetto memoria [Autunno]" (feat. Claudio Baglioni) – 5:49

== Personnel ==
=== Elio e le Storie Tese ===
- Elio – lead vocals, flute, acoustic guitar
- Rocco Tanica – keyboards
- Cesareo – electric guitar
- Faso – bass guitar
- Christian Meyer – drums
- Jantoman (Uomo) – electronic keyboards

=== Additional musicians ===
- Paolo Panigada (a.k.a. Feiez) – vocals in Single
- Mangoni – vocals in La risposta dell'architetto
- Demo Morselli – horns arrangement in: Tristezza, Parco Sempione, Suicidio a sorpresa, Ignudi fra i nudisti, Supermassiccio
- Vittorio Cosma – keyboards in Il Congresso delle parti molli and spoken intro to some songs
- Claudio Bisio – vocals in La lega dell'amore
- Paola Cortellesi – vocals in Suicidio a sorpresa
- Antonella Ruggiero – vocals in Plafone
- Giorgia – vocals in Ignudi fra i nudisti
- Irene Grandi – vocals in Heavy Samba
- Claudio Baglioni – vocals in Effetto Memoria (estate) e Effetto Memoria (autunno)
- Massimo Zagonari – saxophone and flute in Ignudi fra i nudisti, Tristezza e Parco Sempione
- Ambrogio Frigerio – trombone in Ignudi fra i nudisti, Parco Sempione e Tristezza
- Lucio Fabbri – violin in Indiani (A caval donando)
- Remo Ceriotti – banjo in Indiani (A caval donando)
- Paola Folli – vocals in Suicidio a sorpresa
- Lola Feghaly – vocals in Suicidio a sorpresa

== Charts ==
Chart (2008)	Peak position
Italian Albums (FIMI)	5
