= Del meglio del nostro meglio Vol. 1 =

Compilation album by Elio e le Storie Tese
- Released: November 6, 1997
- Genres: Rock, comedy rock
- Length: 75:00
- Labels: Aspirine; Sony BMG
- Producer: Otar Bolivecic

Elio e le Storie Tese chronology
| Eat the Phikis (1996) | Del meglio del nostro meglio Vol. 1 (1997) | Peerla (1998) |

Del meglio del nostro meglio Vol. 1 is the first greatest hits compilation by Italian rock band Elio e le Storie Tese.

== Track listing ==
1. "Born to be Abramo?" 0:14
2. "Born to be Abramo" – 4:57 (featuring Patrick Hernandez) (Note: Alternative or new version.)
3. "L'astronauta pasticcione" – 4:51 (Note: Previously unreleased.)
4. "Servi della gleba" – 4:38
5. "Tapparella" – 6:11
6. "L'eterna lotta tra il bene e il male" – 4:10
7. "La terra dei cachi" (Studio version) – 4:16
8. "Pipppero®" – 4:20
9. "Nubi di ieri sul nostro domani odierno (Abitudinario)" – 4:17
10. "Burattino senza fichi" – 4:53
11. "Supergiovane" – 8:24
12. "Cara ti amo (Risvolti psicologici nei rapporti fra giovani uomini e giovani donne)" – 5:03
13. "John Holmes" – 3:47
14. "Alfieri" [Live at Circolo Fratellanza e Pace of Legnano 19\07\1986] – 6:25
15. "Sos epidos" – 1:30

== Track details ==
- "Born to be Abramo?" is a sample from a contemporary advertisement for "Ava" laundry detergent, where Claudia Mori sang a reference to "La terra dei cachi" on a different melody, possibly for copyright reasons. The sample is interrupted by a loud scream from the band members.
- "Born to be Abramo" is a re-recording of the band's banned 1990 single, featuring guest Patrick Hernandez singing a parody of his own hit "Born to Be Alive" on religious-themed Italian lyrics by missionary Gigi Cocquio.
- "L'astronauta pasticcione" ("The bungling astronaut"), the first of two previously unreleased songs on the album, is a ballad about a very inept astronaut who gets sick with diarrhea as a result of space travel and ends up releasing his feces into his space suit, causing a horribly unbearable smell. The song, however, describes the event in a very sweet, almost poetical way. On a musical level, the song's chorus uses the chords from the 1975 song "Lighthouse" by James Taylor, as well as a reference to "Squonk" (1976) by Genesis.
- "Introservi" is a ballad-like intro to the following track, "Servi della gleba", already released as a ghost track on İtalyan, rum casusu çikti.
- "Servi della gleba", "Tapparella", "Pipppero" and "Burattino senza fichi" are all identical to the respective versions on the band's past albums.
- "La terra dei cachi" is the studio version of the song, previously available only on a promo single. The band's live performance of the song at the 1996 Sanremo Music Festival was released on Eat the Phikis.
- "L'eterna lotta tra il bene e il male" ("The eternal fight between good and evil"), the second previously unreleased song on the album, uses the backing track to the 1995 song "Very Good Very Bad", from the Bollywood film Trimurti, overlaid with multiple samples from a series of angry, offending and profane voicemails left on keyboard player Sergio Conforti's answering machine by an anonymous elderly lady from Milan, nicknamed "Nasty sciura" ("sciura" being Milanese for "lady") by Conforti (a.k.a. Rocco Tanica) - who apparently mistook him for the band's lead singer. In the voicemails, "Nasty sciura" repeatedly insults Conforti about the recurring use of vulgarity in the band's songs, accusing him (among other things) of having mentally corrupted her son. This track also includes a few lines sung by Elio on a melody from "Within You, Without You" by The Beatles.
- "Abitudinario", "Supergiovane" and "John Holmes" are new recordings of the respective songs, with small alterations (mostly consisting in slight changes to the performances and the samples used on the tracks).
- "Cara ti amo" is a completely new recording of the same-titled song, a surreal dialogue between two lovers, from Elio samaga hukapan kariyana turu. It is purported to be live but it was actually made in a studio, as the purported location of the live recording, "Baritone Women's Bar in Prugliasco, Switzerland", is invented - although "Planet of the Baritone Women" is a track from Frank Zappa's 1988 live album Broadway the Hard Way. As on the previous album version, the dialogue (performed by Elio and Tanica) is almost completely improvised.
- "Alfieri" ("Ensigns") is the only officially available version, recorded live in 1986 in a Legnano club, of the band's concluding song from their 1980s/early 1990s live shows, where, after a semi-serious verse by Elio, each band member introduces himself in a comedic verse, before ending with an equally comedic unison choir. On this particular recording, bassist Nicola Fasani (a.k.a. Faso or Pasto) and guitarist Davide Civaschi (a.k.a. Cesàreo) are heard laughing throughout their verses (because the other members are teasing them and playing practical jokes to them) and barely managing to sing their lyrics.
- "Sos epidos" ("The debts" in Sardinian) is a satirical song about debts, sung in the local language by a group of Sardinian tenores.

== Album title and artwork ==
The album title alludes to a series of best-of albums by Mina, all entitled Del mio meglio and numbered. (In 1997 the latest volume in Mina's series, released in 1987, was Volume 9.) The cover artwork is a stereotypical stock photo, vaguely similar to several other previous releases, depicting two silhouettes of a girl and a boy, holding hands in front of a sunset on the sea. According to a statement by Elio during an episode of Cordialmente (the band's own radio show on Radio Deejay), broadcast at the time, the photo actually depicts two males, although the reliability of such a statement is debatable.

== Charts ==
| Chart (1997) | Peak position |
|---|---|
| Italian Albums (Musica e dischi) | 17 |
