= Pilipino rock =

Pilipino rock may refer to:

- Pinoy rock or Filipino rock music.
- Pilipino Rock, a track listed in Cicciput, a 2003 studio album by the Italian rock band Elio e le Storie Tese.
