= Il meglio di Grazie per la splendida serata =

Il meglio di Grazie per la splendida serata.

Live album by Elio e le Storie Tese
- Released: October 25, 2005
- Genre: Comedy rock
- Length: 176:26
- Label: Hukapan

Elio e le Storie Tese chronology
Il meglio di Ho fatto due etti e mezzo, lascio? (2004)	Il meglio di Grazie per la splendida serata. (2005)	Studentessi (2008)

Il meglio di Grazie per la splendida serata is a box by Elio e le Storie Tese, featuring three CDs of the best performances from the 2005 CDs brulé, instant CDs of their live performances immediately sold after the concert, therefore without any afterwards correction.

The CDs brulé whose best performances selected by the band have flowed into the albums Il meglio di Ho fatto due etti e mezzo, lascio? and Il meglio di Grazie per la splendida serata represent the first project of this kind in Italy.

It was initially released on the iTunes Store on October 25, 2005. It was made available for general sale on November 15, 2005.

== Track listing ==
=== Grazie per la splendida serata Vol. 1 ===
1. "Shpalman®" (live in Papiano 23 July 2005)
2. "(Gomito a gomito con l') Aborto" (live in Bottanuco 20 July 2005)
3. "La terra dei cachi" (live in Domodossola 27 June 2005)
4. "Fossi figo" (live in Castellazzo di Bollate 21 July 2005)
5. "Nudo e senza cacchio" (live in Castellazzo di Bollate 21 July 2005)
6. "Gimmi I." (live in Papiano 23 July 2005)
7. "Bis" (live in Travo 3 July 2005)
8. "L'astronauta pasticcione" (live in Travo 3 July 2005)
9. "Alfieri" (live in Bottanuco 20 July 2005)
10. "Discomusic" (live in Collegno 19 July 2005)
11. "Tapparella" (live in Papiano 23 July 2005)

=== Grazie per la splendida serata Vol. 2 ===
1. "Noi siamo i giovani (con i blue jeans)" (live in Sarroch 16 August 2005)
2. "La chanson" (live in Stimigliano 24 July 2005)
3. "Silos" (live in Ulignano 27 August 2005)
4. "Piattaforma" (live in Mogoro 30 July 2005)
5. "Aü" (live in Mogoro 30 July 2005)
6. "La follia della donna" (live in Stintino 29 July 2005)
7. "Omosessualità" (live in Ulignano 27 August 2005)
8. "Pagàno" (live in Stimigliano 24 July 2005)
9. "Li immortacci" (live in Stimigliano 24 July 2005)
10. "Urna" (live in Colle d'Anchise 6 August 2005)
11. "Supergiovane" (live in Sarroch 16 August 2005)

=== Grazie per la splendida serata Vol. 3 ===
1. "Abate cruento" (live in Modena 12 September 2005)
2. "T.V.U.M.D.B. (live in Milano" 14 September 2005)
3. "Hommage à Violette Nozières" (live in Milano 14 September 2005)
4. "Caro 2000" (live in Genova 13 September 2005)
5. "Litfiba tornate insieme" (live in Roma 17 September 2005)
6. "Cani e padroni di cani" (live in Modena 12 September 2005)
7. "Nella vecchia azienda agricola" (live in Roma 17 September 2005)
8. "Giocatore mondiale" (live in Modena 12 September 2005)
9. "Acido lattico" (live in Roma 17 September 2005)
10. "Budy Giampi" (live in Milano 14 September 2005)
