= Paola Tovaglia =

Italian television presenter and voice actress

- Born: 9 April 1965; Milan, Italy
- Died: 6 April 1994 (aged 28); Milan, Italy
- Other names: Paola Maralli; Peev Agliato
- Occupations: Television presenter; voice actress; singer
- Years active: 1986–1994

Paola Tovaglia (9 April 1965 – 6 April 1994) was an Italian children's television presenter, voice actress and singer. She was best known for her work on the children's television show Ciao Ciao.

== Biography ==
Born in Milan, Tovaglia began her career at some point during the 1980s. She joined the cast of Ciao Ciao in 1989 and she sometimes collaborated with the comedy rock band Elio e le Storie Tese. Her pseudonyms Paola Maralli and Peev Agliato (which she used for different professions) were taken from the surnames of both her grandmothers.

As a voice actress, Tovaglia dubbed the voices of characters in many animated cartoons which included Lynn Russell in Lady!!, Lickety Split in My Little Pony, Bianca Dupree in Beverly Hills Teens and she also provided voices in the anime show Aishite Knight.

Tovaglia also sung a majority of songs during her time on Ciao Ciao. Near the beginning of her career, she played the guitar and auditioned on several talent shows on television.

== Death ==
Tovaglia died of brain cancer in Milan on 6 April 1994, just three days before her 29th birthday. Despite already having surgery, her cancer returned. She was laid to rest at the cemetery in Montemurlo.

=== Commemoration ===
Elio e le Storie Tese's album İtalyan, rum casusu çikti is dedicated to Tovaglia's memory.
