= Figgatta de Blanc =

Album by Elio e le Storie Tese

Studio album by Elio e le Storie Tese
- Released: February 12, 2016
- Genre: Comedy rock
- Length: 67:50
- Label: Hukapan
- Producer: Elio e le Storie Tese; Max Costa; Otar Bolivecic

Elio e le Storie Tese chronology
L'album biango (2013)	Figgatta de Blanc (2016)

Figgatta de Blanc is the tenth and final studio album by Italian rock band Elio e le Storie Tese, published in 2016.

The name is a parody of The Police's Reggatta de Blanc.

== Track listing ==
1. "Figgatta de Blanc" – 0:49
2. "Vacanza alternativa" – 4:44
3. "She Wants" – 4:58
4. "Parla come mangi" – 5:49
5. "Il mistero dei bulli" – 5:17
6. "China disco bar" – 5:06
7. "Il quinto ripensamento" – 3:08
8. "Bomba intelligente" – 4:59
9. "Inquisizione" – 5:53
10. "Ritmo sbilenco" – 6:05
11. "Il rock della tangenziale" – 2:56
12. "Cameroon" – 4:10
13. "I delfini nuotano" – 5:38
14. "Il primo giorno di scuola" – 4:36
15. "Vincere l'odio" – 3:52

== Charts ==
Chart (2013)	Peak position
Italian Albums (FIMI)	5
