= İtalyan, rum casusu çikti =

İtalyan, rum casusu çıktı

Studio album by Elio e le Storie Tese
- Released: June 10, 1992
- Recorded: 1992
- Genres: Comedy rock, alternative rock, progressive rock
- Length: 62:18
- Labels: Hukapan; Sony Music
- Producer: Otar Bolivecic

Elio e le Storie Tese chronology
The Los Sri Lanka Parakramabahu Brothers Featuring Elio e le Storie Tese (1990)	İtalyan, rum casusu çıktı (1992)	Esco dal mio corpo e ho molta paura: Gli inediti 1979–1986 (1993)

İtalyan, rum casusu çıktı (Turkish for 'Italian [man] found to be a Greek spy') is the second studio album by Italian rock band Elio e le Storie Tese.

The title phrase appeared in a Turkish newspaper after Massimo Rana, an Italian photographer, who was believed to be a spy, was arrested in 1991 by the Turkish-Cypriot police.

The album is considered one of the band's finest works by audiences and reviewers alike.

== Songs ==
As with other albums by the band, İtalyan, rum casusu çikti features a number of samples, quotes and references to other songs and genres, as well as the band's usual mix of serious and comedy-oriented lyrics.

- "Rum casusu" features a sample of Ferruccio Amendola dubbing Sylvester Stallone in Rocky V, telling a joke based on the lyrics of Elio e le Storie Tese's 1989 song "Nubi di ieri sul nostro domani odierno (Abitudinario)".
- The backing track to "Servi della gleba?" is "Pilentse Pee", the opening track on the 1975 album Le Mystère des Voix Bulgares by the same-named Bulgarian female choir who are also featured on "Pipppero". The question mark in the title is a possible reference to "In the Flesh?" by Pink Floyd.
- "Servi della gleba" (in English "Servants of the glebe"), an ironical song about eternally rejected male wannabe-romancers (represented by the two of spades, an Italian symbol for a rejection), quotes the drum groove from "Rosanna" by Toto, and one line from singer-songwriter Stefano Rosso's deliberately controversial 1977 hit "Una storia disonesta/Anche se fosse peggio".
- "Uomini col borsello" (literally, "Men with purses"), whose lyrics, according to the band's website, are based on an Iberian legend from the 17th century, is a song about sexual frustration, depicting men and women as being respectively equipped with locked purses and purse keys. The Chieftains and Riccardo Fogli, in the main role of a lonesome man, guest on the track. It includes references to "Toffee" by Vasco Rossi, "Let It Be" by The Beatles, Fogli's own recitation (in Italian but with a deliberately faked English accent) in his original recording of "Piccola Katy" (1968) as a member of Pooh and, in the second half of the solo, "I Want It All" by Queen.
- "Il vitello dai piedi di balsa" ("The balsa wood-footed calf") quotes Paul McCartney's piano intro from The Beatles' "Golden Slumbers", two piano notes from "Lazing on a Sunday Afternoon" by Queen, "A Whiter Shade of Pale" by Procol Harum and a short pedal steel guitar passage from Pink Floyd's "The Great Gig in the Sky". Lyrically, the song is a twisted fairytale with dark overtones, featuring four calves with feet of different materials (balsa wood, cobalt, sponge and tuna), happily living "in the small wood of [Elio's] fantasy". The titular calf meets his cobalt-footed counterpart (played by guest Enrico Ruggeri) and makes himself guilty of spreading false rumours about the latter's true identity. As a result of this, he gets his feet amputated and he is forced to listen to an excerpt from a Sri Lankan traditional song featured on the band's previous maxi single The Los Sri Lanka Parakramabahu Brothers Featuring Elio e le Storie Tese.
- "Cartoni animati giapponesi" (in English "Japanese manga animated cartoons") is about pornography and porn in general, used, again, as a way to disguise a young man's insecurities about sex. The titular animated cartoons are alluded to only in a short verse in the middle of the song, through comically mispronounced titles by the band's guest keyboardist Vittorio Cosma. A sample from Marco Masini is also featured; the singer's voice was electronically edited so he appears to sing the word "sperm". The song's mildly explicit lyrics are not included in the booklet, which instead features a lengthy and partly jocular explanation for the missing lyrics.
- "Cinquecento", sung by guitarist Davide Civaschi (as Cesàreo), is a parody of a song produced by Gino Paoli for a Fiat Cinquecento advertisement, while at the same time poking fun at corruption practices in Italian politics.
- "Supergiovane" (in English "Superyoungster") is about an imaginary superhero, played by Mangoni, who acts as a spokesman for the younger generation, but whose speech mannerisms, all derived from very outdated 1970s youth culture slang, actually identify him as middle-aged or downright old: in an oddly reversed version of the Nadsat language from Anthony Burgess's 1962 novel A Clockwork Orange, the book's protagonist seems timelessly young, while "Supergiovane" sounds timelessly and hopelessly old. He is derided by an older man (played by Diego Abatantuono) because of this. A very complex prog rock song with several time signature changes, "Supergiovane" does not feature any external musical references or samples, apart from a brief allusion to Maurice Ravel's Boléro.
- "Essere donna oggi" (in English "Being a woman today") is about a woman's pains over menstruation, which lead her to a selfish attitude and to ignore her partner (played by Elio). All of this is seen from the latter's perspective, creating an ironical clash. The lyrics allude to Loretta Goggi, to her 1981 hit "Maledetta primavera", whose lyrics use spring as a mildly erotic metaphor for a woman's sexual disillusionment) and to her very early acting performance in the 1969 Middle Ages-themed TV series La freccia nera, where she mostly appeared in a male disguise. The final guitar solo in the song, although apparently modelled on Frank Zappa's "Any Downers?", was actually a one-take improvisation by guitarist Cesàreo.
- With its title parodying the late 1970s American sitcom Mork & Mindy, "Pork & Cindy" is the bitterly funny story of a failed romance between a woman and a man, which is doomed from the very start as she is a prostitute and he is her pimp. The song includes a short recap of John Bonham's drum solo in Led Zeppelin's "Moby Dick", and its melody is very similar to "C'è" by Stadio.
- "Pipppero" is a parody of an instructional dance song from Bulgaria that also aims at emphasising the cultural richness of the country. It is freely based on the female choir from Le Mystère des Voix Bulgares's song "Dilmano Dilbero" (in Bulgarian "Дилмано, Дилберо", translated as "My beautiful Dilmano"), which uses banana pepper ("pipero" in Bulgarian) as a metaphor for sex, and is featured on the choir's fourth album, entitled Volume 4. While listening to the album, Elio misinterpreted the song's recurring chant as "Più umano, più vero" ("More human, more truthful"), (Note: In Bulgarian pronunciation, an L sound after the vowel I is likely to turn into "ul"; thus, in the choir's pronunciation, "dilmano dilbero" actually sounded like "dyulmano dyulbero".) and built the entire lyric from that. Lyrically, the song features references to Bulgarian secret agents in connection with Pope John Paul II assassination attempt and, in the ending, a long list of disco classics from the 1970s. On a musical level, the song features the bassline from "Piranha", the B-side from Afric Simone's 1975 disco hit "Ramaya", which is also briefly sampled. Other featured samples include "A ba-ba-ba" from The Beach Boys' 1965 rendition of "Barbara Ann" and the drum machine beat from "The Power" by Snap!, while the main melody sung by Elio is very similar to the recurring riff in The Beatles' "I Feel Fine". During live performances, drummer Christian Meyer, by playing live drums over the drum machine rhythm, occasionally turned the song's groove into something similar, again, to Toto's "Rosanna". Furthermore, during the first live performances the song was followed by a medley of very short excerpts from all of the 1970s songs mentioned in the lyrics. According to later testimonies by fans, the band quickly stopped performing the medley when they realized that their mostly young audience did not understand any of the musical references.
- "Il vitello dai piedi di balsa (reprise)" continues and finishes the dark fairytale in track 6. After his encounter with the gay bear, the balsa-footed lamb is fully outed as being gay himself, and happily accepts his orientation.
- "Urna" (English: "Urn") is about death. Specifically, the song is about the singer's bluntly stated desire to be cremated and placed in an urn as soon as he dies. This is, however, offset by Elio's thrash metal arrangement, a complete change from the jazz fusion setting originally intended for the song by its main composer, bassist Nicola Fasani (a.k.a. Faso). In a later interview, Fasani stated that he hated the metal arrangement with a passion, referring to the released version as "pure shit". The original recording, with Fasani's preferred arrangement, was featured in the band's 1998 compilation Peerla.
- "Arrivederci" is a short parody of the slow ballads typically used as end credits tunes for 1970s Italian variety shows such as Domenica in and features the band saying goodbye to the audience.
- Taking its cue from an old Italian stereotypical joke about an Italian, a Frenchman and an Englishman having to deal with a fake ghost, "La vendetta del fantasma Formaggino" (English: "The revenge of the Mini-Cheese Ghost") spins a tale of an unnamed narrator getting lost in "Jokeland", where all popular jokes are set, meeting the three characters from the joke and involving them in another similar and stereotypical joke. Later on, he decides to take revenge on the Italian character in the original joke by getting himself involved in the joke and masquerading as the ghost. The Italian man is about to defeat the narrator again in the same way as the joke, but the latter is chastised for changing the original ending by the Supreme God of Jokes (played by Diego Abatantuono in his second guest appearance on the album), who incinerates him by blowing a raspberry. The song features six very different sections in different tempos and a long series of musical/lyrical quotations: "Come te non c'è nessuno" by Rita Pavone, "Andavo a cento all'ora" and "Un mondo d'amore" by Gianni Morandi, a bass guitar exercise by Jaco Pastorius, "Nessuno mai" by Marcella Bella, a sample from "Sei bellissima" by Loredana Bertè, seven notes from the Italian National Anthem "Fratelli d'Italia", two full verses and the chorus from "This Jesus Must Die" from Jesus Christ Superstar and, finally, a slightly distorted and imprecise quote from the Neapolitan song "I' te vurria vasà".
- Following about one minute of silence after the conclusion of the last track, the album ends with a ghost track: an extremely sped-up (about 6.5x) and electronically reversed version of "Introservi", a ballad-like intro to "Servi della gleba". This song would later be re-recorded by the band for their 1997 compilation Del meglio del nostro meglio Vol. 1.

== Track listing ==
1. "Rum casusu" – 0:21
2. "Servi della gleba?" – 0:17
3. "Servi della gleba" 4:38
4. "Arriva Elio" – 0:56
5. "Uomini col borsello (ragazza che limoni sola)" – 5:19
6. "Il vitello dai piedi di balsa" – 3:09
7. "Cartoni animati giapponesi" – 4:20
8. "Cinquecento" – 1:34
9. "Supergiovane" – 8:24
10. "Essere donna oggi" – 7:00
11. "Pork & Cindy" – 5:09
12. "Pipppero®" – 4:45
13. "Il vitello dai piedi di balsa (reprise)" – 1:31
14. "Urna" – 4:55
15. "Arrivederci" – 1:48
16. "La vendetta del fantasma Formaggino" – 8:06

== Cover artwork ==
The artwork, partially based on a stock photo and digitally re-touched by CGI artist Alex Koban, ironically reverses a concept taken from the 1984 spy-parody film Top Secret!, in keeping with the spy theme in the album title. In the film, three spies masquerade themselves as a cow in order to spy on a military installation, but the film itself shows a real cow wearing wellies on its legs; the album, instead, features a plainly fake legless cow, made out of cardboard, with a pair of real human feet and legs emerging from it. The limbs were originally meant to be Elio's, but Koban refused to use them as they were very hairy; his choice went instead to Giancarlo Bozzo, founder and co-owner of Milan's stand-up comedy club Zelig, where the band had its debut. Later on, Bozzo's feet were digitally replaced with Faso's.

== Personnel ==
- Stefano Belisari as Elio – vocals
- Sergio Conforti as Rocco Tanica – piano
- Davide Civaschi as Cesareo – electric guitar
- Nicola Fasani as Faso – bass
- Paolo Panigada as Feiez – sax, guitar, keyboards, backing vocals

Guest musicians

- Curt Cress – drums
- Le Mystère des Voix Bulgares, backing vocals on tracks 2, 7, 10, 12 and 14
- Riccardo Fogli, vocals on track 5
- Sir Oliver Skardy, vocals on track 5
- The Chieftains, introduction of track 5
- Enrico Ruggeri, vocals on tracks 6 and 13
- Mangoni, vocals on tracks 6, 9, 13 and 16
- Christian Meyer, drums and washboard on track 6
- Diego Abatantuono, vocals on tracks 10 and 16

== Charts ==
Chart (1992)	Peak position
Italian Albums (Musica e dischi)	8
