= La canzone mononota =

Single by Elio e le Storie Tese

from the album L'album biango
- Released: February 14, 2013
- Genre: Comedy rock
- Length: 3:25
- Label: Hukapan; Sony Music Entertainment

Elio e le Storie Tese singles chronology
"'Dannati forever'" (2013)	"La canzone mononota" (2013)	"'Complesso del primo maggio'" (2013)

"La canzone mononota" is a 2013 single by Elio e le Storie Tese.

Elio e le Store Tese participated with this song to the Sanremo Music Festival 2013, achieving the second place and winning the Critics' Award "Mia Martini", the award for the best arrangement and the Radio and TV Press-Room award.

Faithfully complying with its title, which translates to The One-Note Song, most of the song is sung on one note, i.e. C or Do.

== Charts ==
Chart (2013)	Peak position
Italy (FIMI)	6
