= Il meglio di Ho fatto due etti e mezzo, lascio? =

Live album by Elio e le Storie Tese
- Released: November 3, 2004
- Genre: Comedy rock
- Length: 170:46
- Label: Hukapan

Elio e le Storie Tese chronology
Cicciput (2003)	Il meglio di Ho fatto due etti e mezzo, lascio? (2004)	Il meglio di Grazie per la splendida serata (2005)

Il meglio di Ho fatto due etti e mezzo, lascio? is a box by Elio e le Storie Tese, featuring three CDs of the best performances from the 2004 CDs brulé, instant CDs of their live performances immediately sold after the concert, therefore without any afterwards correction.

The CDs brulé whose best performances selected by the band have flowed into the albums Il meglio di Ho fatto due etti e mezzo, lascio? and Il meglio di Grazie per la splendida serata represent the first project of this kind in Italy.

== Track listing ==
=== Ho fatto 2 etti e mezzo, lascio? ===
1. "Carro" 4:42 (live in Collegno 23 June 2004)
2. "Psichedelia" – 5:31 (live in Collegno 23 June 2004)
3. "Cartoni animati giapponesi" – 4:48 (live in Torino 21 March 2004)
4. "La ditta" – 3:08 (live in Montichiari 3 July 2004)
5. "La vendetta del Fantasma Formaggino" – 9:16 (live in Torino 21 March 2004)
6. "Nubi di ieri sul nostro domani odierno (Abitudinario)" – 5:12 (live in Macomer 30 July 2004)
7. "Catalogna" – 2:50 (live in Montichiari 3 July 2004)
8. "Cateto" – 5:31 (live in Macomer 30 July 2004)
9. "Burattino senza fichi" – 5:28 (live in Macomer 30 July 2004)
10. "Mio cuggino" – 5:35 (live in Belluno 18 March 2004)
11. "Largo al factotum" – 5:16 (live in Collegno 23 June 2004)

=== Ho fatto 2 etti e mezzo, lascio? Vol. 2 ===
1. "John Holmes (Una vita per il cinema)" – 4:46 (live in Tavagnacco 22 July 2004)
2. "Essere donna oggi" – 5:54 (live in Riccione 5 August 2004)
3. "Pipppero®" – 4:15 (live in Riccione 5 August 2004)
4. "Lo stato A, lo stato B" – 4:28 (live in Lari 6 August 2004)
5. "El Pube" – 6:54 (live in San Giovanni in Persiceto 4 July 2004)
6. "Il vitello dai piedi di balsa" – 3:26 (live in Carpi 21 July 2004)
7. "Il vitello dai piedi di balsa (reprise)" – 3:50 (live in Carpi 21 July 2004)
8. "Uomini col borsello" – 6:37 (live in Lari 6 August 2004)
9. "Né carne né pesce" – 5:21 (live in San Giovanni in Persiceto 4 July 2004)
10. "Supergiovane" – 8:48 (live in Carpi 21 July 2004)

=== Ho fatto 2 etti e mezzo, lascio? Vol. 3 ===
1. "Farmacista" – 6:39 (live in Mantova 10 September 2004)
2. "Pork & Cindy" – 6:40 (live in Mantova 10 September 2004)
3. "Milza" – 4:11 (live in Mantova 10 September 2004)
4. "Born to be Abramo" – 5:21 (live in Padova 2 October 2004)
5. "Il rock and roll" – 5:57 (live in Cernusco S/N 17 September 2004)
6. "Cassonetto differenziato per il frutto del peccato" – 5:12 (live in Reggio Emilia 4 September 2004)
7. "Evviva" – 1:11 (live in Reggio Emilia 4 September 2004)
8. "La visione" – 5:23 (live in Mantova 10 September 2004)
9. "Servi della gleba" – 6:15 (live in Padova 2 October 2004)
10. "Ocio ocio" – 3:58 (live in Padova 2 October 2004)
11. "Cara ti amo" – 8:09 (live in Padova 2 October 2004)

== Charts ==
Chart (2004)	Peak position
Italian Albums (FIMI)	67
