= Tutti gli uomini del deficiente (album) =

Soundtrack album by Elio e le Storie Tese
- Released: December 4, 1999
- Genre: Comedy rock
- Length: 47:41
- Label: Aspirine; Sony BMG

Elio e le Storie Tese chronology
Craccracriccrecr (1999)	Tutti gli uomini del deficiente (1999)	Made in Japan (Live at Parco Capello) (2001)

Tutti gli uomini del deficiente is a soundtrack album by Italian rock band Elio e le Storie Tese made for the film with the same title.

The album sees the collaboration of Mauro Pagani, Raffaella Carrà and Lucio Dalla.

== Track listing ==
1. "L'arrivo" – 0:20
2. "Psichedelia" – 4:25
3. "Ballate bastardi" – 1:45
4. "Yes I Love You" – 3:19
5. "Tell Me You Love Me" – 2:20
6. "Il sogno del coiffeur" – 0:41
7. "L'indianata" – 4:21
8. "Tonza patonza" – 1:09
9. "Risate a denti stretti" – 4:08
10. "Ranella impazzita" – 0:30
11. "Furgoni fratricidi" – 0:58
12. "Hommage à Violette Nozières" – 3:18
13. "Ci sentiamo in settimana" – 1:00
14. "Acido lattico" – 3:36
15. "Oh Yes" – 0:40
16. "Palla medica" – 2:17
17. "Tegole fratricide" – 1:05
18. "Super Maison" – 3:49
19. "Mamma non mamma" – 1:23
20. "Presidance®" – 3:23
21. "Pignoramento" – 1:07
22. "Maritto ogami" – 1:57
