= La terra dei cachi =

Single by Elio e le Storie Tese
- Released: 1996
- Genre: Comedy rock, pop
- Length: 4:05
- Label: Aspirine
- Producer: Otar Bolivecic

Elio e le Storie Tese singles chronology
"Christmas with the Yours" (1995)	"La terra dei cachi" (1996)	"T.V.U.M.D.B./Mio cuggino" (1996)

"La terra dei cachi" ("The Land of Persimmons") is a 1996 single by Elio e le Storie Tese.

Thanks to a live performance of this song, which represents a humorous take on Italian lifestyle, Elio e le Storie Tese acquired national notoriety by achieving a second-place finish at the Sanremo Music Festival 1996. "La terra dei cachi" also won the Critics' Award "Mia Martini" at the same festival.

A total of four versions of the single have been released: "La terra dei cachi live in Sanremo", "La terra dei cachi – Prezioso remix", "La terra dei cachi (The Rimini Tapes)", rearranged in a liscio version and featuring the Casadei Orchestra, and "La terra dei cachi", a promo single studio version of the song.

A studio version of the song has been released in Del meglio del nostro meglio Vol. 1, whereas the live version from Sanremo Music Festival has been included also in Eat the Phikis.

== Track listing ==
La terra dei cachi live in Sanremo

1. "La terra dei cachi" (live in Sanremo)

La terra dei cachi – Prezioso remix

1. "La terra dei cachi (Prezioso Remix)"
2. "La terra dei cachi (The Rimini Tapes)" (feat. Raoul Casadei)

La terra dei cachi (The Rimini Tapes)

1. "La terra dei cachi" (feat. Raoul Casadei)
2. "Gli occhiali dell'amore"
3. "Mambo Italiano" (by Raoul Casadei and Italian Orchestra)

La terra dei cachi

1. "La terra dei cachi"

== Personnel ==
- Elio – vocals
- Rocco Tanica – keyboard
- Cesareo – electric guitar
- Faso – bass
- Turtello – drums
- Feiez – acoustic guitar

The version recorded live at the Sanremo festival features the Rai Orchestra and Peppe Vessicchio as orchestra director.

== Charts ==
Chart (1996)	Peak position
Europe (European Hot 100 Singles)	55
Italy (Musica e dischi)	1
