= L'album biango =

Studio album by Elio e le Storie Tese
- Released: May 7, 2013
- Genre: Comedy rock
- Length: 69:05
- Label: Hukapan; Sony Music
- Producer: Elio e le Storie Tese; MC Costa

Elio e le Storie Tese chronology
Gattini (2009)	L'album biango (2013)	Figgatta de Blanc (2016)

L'album biango is the ninth studio album by Italian rock band Elio e le Storie Tese, published in 2013.

The name is a parody of The Beatles' White Album, in which the adjective "biango" (properly "bianco", Italian for "white") is deliberately misspelled.

L'album biango has been certified gold in Italy.

== Track listing ==
1. "Televisione russa" – 0:29
2. "Dannati forever" – 3:58
3. "La canzone mononota" – 4:58
4. "Il ritmo della sala prove" – 4:13
5. "Lettere dal WWW" – 0:59
6. "Enlarge (Your Penis)" – 3:34
7. "Lampo" – 4:39
8. "Luigi il pugilista" – 5:27
9. "Una sera con gli amici" – 4:37
10. "Amore amorissimo" – 3:56
11. "Il tutor di Nerone" – 5:02
12. "Reggia (Base per altezza)" – 2:54
13. "Come gli Area" – 3:45
14. "A Piazza San Giovanni" – 1:54
15. "Complesso del primo maggio [+ ghost track]" – 18:49

== Charts ==
Chart (2013)	Peak position
Italian Albums (FIMI)	1
