= Cicciput =

Studio album by Elio e le Storie Tese
- Released: May 23, 2003
- Genre: Pop, comedy rock
- Length: 62:02
- Label: Aspirine; Sony BMG
- Producer: Elio e le Storie Tese; MC Costa

Elio e le Storie Tese chronology
Made in Japan (Live at Parco Capello) (2001)	Cicciput (2003)	Il meglio di Ho fatto due etti e mezzo, lascio? (2004)

Cicciput is a 2003 studio album by Italian rock band Elio e le Storie Tese.

In 2003, Elio e le Storie Tese won the Best Italian Videoclip award at the Italian Music Awards of Federation of the Italian Music Industry for the videoclip of the song "Shpalman®", included in Cicciput.

Cicciput has been certified gold in Italy.

== Track listing ==
1. "Cicciput" – 0:47
2. "Budy Giampi" – 4:58
3. "Gimmi I." – 4:21
4. "Fossi figo" – 5:24
5. "Cani e padroni di cani" – 4:35
6. "La follia della donna (Parte I)" – 3:21
7. "Shpalman®" – 5:08
8. "La chanson" – 5:25
9. "Pagàno" – 5:30
10. "Abate cruento" – 5:54
11. "Pilipino Rock" – 3:36
12. "Litfiba tornate insieme" – 4:07
13. "Pagàno karaoke" (ghost track) – 7:19

== Personnel ==
- Elio - lead vocals, flute, acoustic guitar
- Rocco Tanica - keyboards
- Cesareo - electric guitar
- Faso - bass guitar
- Christian Meyer - drums
- Jantoman (Uomo) - electronic keyboards

== Charts ==
Chart (2003)	Peak position
Italian Albums (FIMI)	4
