= Curt Cress =

German drummer and composer (born 1952)

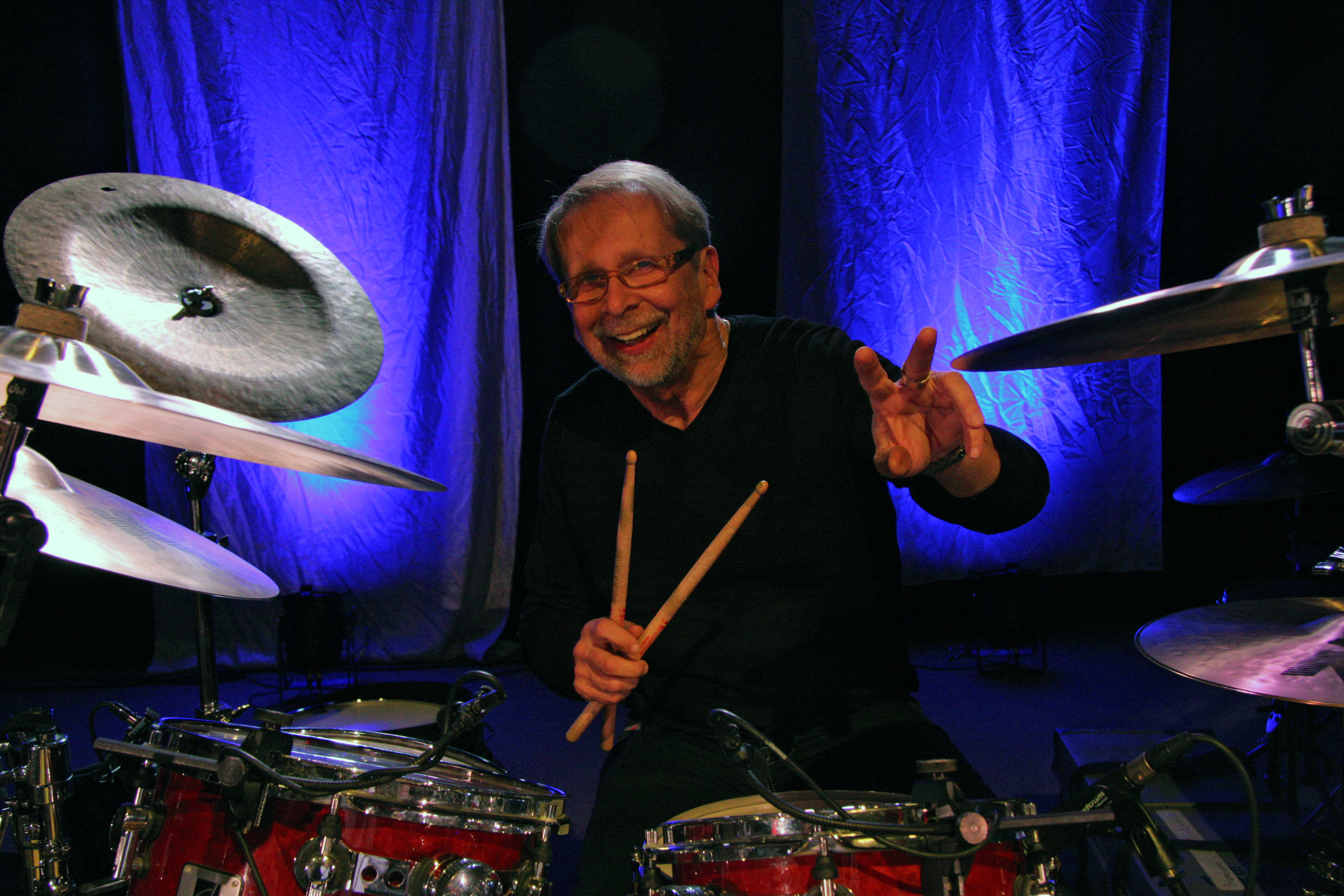
- Cress in 2011

Background information
- Born: Curtis Cress; 11 August 1952 (age 73); Brachttal, West Germany
- Occupations: Musician; singer; songwriter
- Instrument: Drums
- Years active: 1965–present

Curtis Cress (born 11 August 1952), known by his stage name Curt Cress, is a German musician, singer and songwriter.

== Life and work ==
Curt Cress began his career in 1965 in Hanau with the band Load. Later also in Hanau he played with the bands Inspiration Six and most recently in 1969 Orange Peel, which was officially disbanded again the very next year, but comes together for occasional appearances. He has taken part in about 12,000 published recordings sold on at least 400 million records. He worked as a member of several bands including Klaus Doldinger's Passport, Atlantis, Spliff, Milli Vanilli and Snowball, Curt Cress Clan, and as a guest on numerous studio recordings and live performances with German and international artists, e.g. Falco, Peter Maffay, Rick Springfield, Saga and Tina Turner. In 1977, he replaced original drummer and cofounder Hans Bathelt in the german band Triumvirat, for their album Pompeii, but because of temporary legal quarrels between the keyboardist Hans-Jürgen Fritz and the drummer Hans Bathelt, concerning the name of the group, it was presented as New Triumvirat Presents Pompeii.

Cress is also known as a producer, most notably for Uwe Ochsenknecht, Claudia Cane, Heiner Pudelko, Nena, Nina Hagen and the Royal Philharmonic Orchestra. He continued to work as a studio musician, as for Boney M., Hubert Kah, Michael Cretu, Scorpions, Alphaville, BAP, Inga and Annette Humpe, Peter Cornelius, Marianne Rosenberg, Stefan Waggershausen, Udo Lindenberg, Meat Loaf and Freddie Mercury (Mr. Bad Guy).

Cress also made himself a name as a TV and film music composer. He composed the music for the series SK Kölsch, The Red Mile, HeliCops – Einsatz über Berlin and for the telenovelas Bianca – Wege zum Glück and Julia – Wege zum Glück. Cress is one of the composer's music scene for the series Love in Berlin. He also worked for Tatort and composed, among others, the theme songs of the ARD sports show and Wetten, dass..?. For the feature film Bandits Cress was hired as playback drummer. Since 2009 he records along with Chris Weller and Manuel Mayer for the music of the ZDF telenovela Alisa - Follow your heart.

Since 2006, Cress has been a professor at the Hamburg Hochschule für Musik und Theater; he has taught there since 2004.

His company CC HOLDING GmbH produces media products for music, film, and television. The holding company has F.A.M.E. company Recordings Publishing GmbH, F.A.M.E. Artist Recordings GmbH, CRESS PUBLISHING GmbH, and pilot Tonstudio GmbH.

== Personal life ==
Curt Cress is married and has three children.

== Discography ==
=== Solo work ===
- 1975: Curt Cress Clan (LP)
- 1983: Avanti (LP: WEA 24.0133; CD: WEA 240 133-2)
- 1987: Sing (LP)
- 1992: Bäng (CD)
- 1998: Trip (CD: WEA [Warner] 3984-21825-2)

=== With other musicians ===
- 1972: Atlantis – Atlantis
- 1973: Klaus der Geiger – Arbeit macht frei (LP: Bluff Records, BF 1010)
- 1973: Passport – Hand Made
- 1973: Passport – Looking Thru
- 1974: Doldinger Jubilee Concert
- 1975: Passport – Cross-Collateral
- 1976: Lucifer’s Friend – Mind Exploding (LP: Vertigo)
- 1977: Passport – Iguaçu
- 1977: New Triumvirat – New Triumvirat Presents Pompeii
- 1978: Snowball – Defroster
- 1979: Snowball – Cold Heat
- 1979: Jack-Knife – I Wish You Would
- 1980: Snowball – Follow the White Line
- 1981: Mike Batt – Six Days In Berlin
- 1982: Passport – earthborn
- 1982: Al Bano & Romina Power – Felicità
- 1983: Peter Schilling - Error in the System
- 1984: Alphaville - Forever Young
- 1984: Skiantos - Ti Spalmo la Crema
- 1985: Freddie Mercury - Mr. Bad Guy
- 1985: Far Corporation - Division One
- 1985: Passport - Running in Real Time
- 1986: Meat Loaf - Blind Before I Stop
- 1987: Saga - Wildest Dreams
- 1988: Rick Springfield - Rock Of Life
- 1988–1990: Milli Vanilli
- 1989: Saga - The Beginner's Guide to Throwing Shapes
- 1989: Elio e Le Storie Tese - Elio Samaga Hukapan Kariyana Turu
- 1989: Elio e Le Storie Tese - The Los Sri Lanka Parakramabahu Brothers Featuring Elio e le Storie Tese
- 1990: Alex Gunia – Alex Gunia’s Groove Cut
- 1990–1992: The Real Milli Vanilli
- 1996: Scorpions – Pure Instinct
- 1998: John Wetton and Richard Palmer-James – Monkey Business 1972–1997
- 2018-2019: Alles oder Nichts (TV Serie)

== Awards ==
- 15 times Drummer of the Year (journal)
- Record Prize of the German Phono Academy
- Gold records, and A. for Bandits , BAP , Münchener Freiheit

== Literature ==
- Martin Kunzler: Jazz Encyclopedia. Rowohlt, Reinbek 2002
