= Shpalman® =

Single by Elio e le Storie Tese

from the album Cicciput
- Released: May 9, 2003
- Genre: Comedy rock
- Length: 12:56
- Label: Aspirine

Elio e le Storie Tese singles chronology
"'Fave strapazzate'" (2002)	"Shpalman®" (2003)	"'Fossi figo'" (2003)

"Shpalman®" is a 2003 single by Elio e le Storie Tese featuring Max Pezzali, anticipating the album Cicciput.

In 2003, Elio e le Storie Tese won the Best Italian Videoclip award at the Italian Music Awards of Federation of the Italian Music Industry for the videoclip of the song.

In the same year, the band released a remixed vinyl record of the single titled "Shpalman® RMX", which sees the collaboration, among others, of Gabry Ponte.

The song tells the story of a superhero that, to defeat villains, douses their faces with excrement. It is written by the band's keyboard player Rocco Tanica, along with Italian singer Max Pezzali as a guest. The music video is a parody of the Le Vibrazioni's "Dedicato a te" video.

== Track listing ==
Shpalman®

1. "Shpalman® (radio edit)" – 3:33
2. "Budy Giampi (radio edit)" – 4:38
3. "Budy Giampi (karaoke)" – 4:38

Shpalman® RMX

- Side A
1. "Gabry Ponte Remix" (Extended)
2. "Gabry Ponte Remix" (Radio Cut)
- Side B
1. "Bidda Remix" (Extended)
2. "Bidda Remix" (Radio Version)

== Charts ==
Chart (2013)	Peak position
Italy (FIMI)	20
