= Elio e le Storie Tese =

Italian comedy rock band

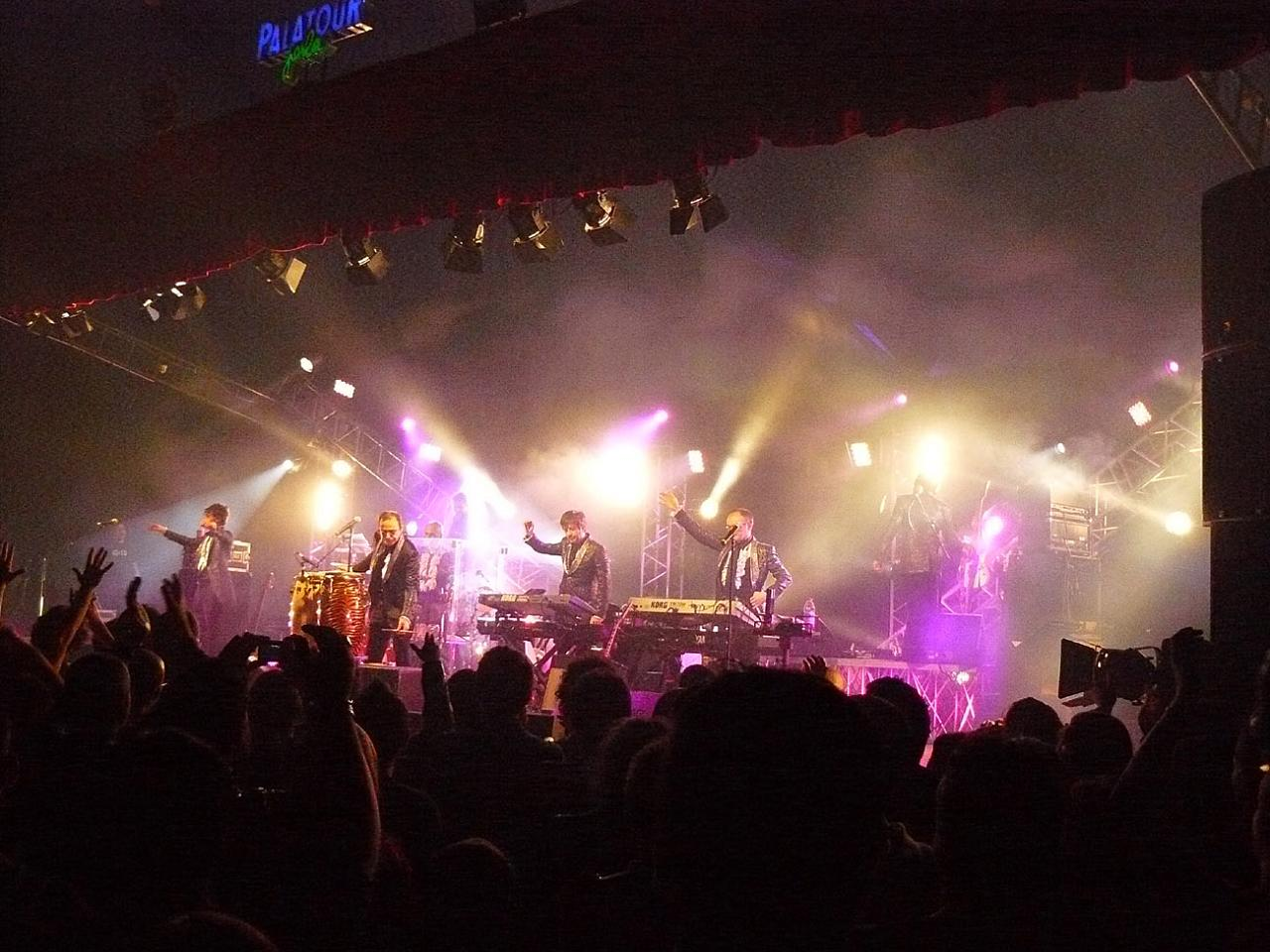
- Elio e le Storie Tese in concert in 2008

Background information
- Also known as: EelST
- Origin: Milan, Italy
- Genres: Comedy rock; progressive pop
- Years active: 1979–2018; 2023–present
- Labels: Psycho, Hukapan, Aspirine
- Members: Stefano Belisari (Elio); Sergio Conforti (Rocco Tanica); Nicola Fasani (Faso); Davide Civaschi (Cesareo); Christian Meyer (Meyer); Antonello Aguzzi (Jantoman); Luca Mangoni (Mangoni)
- Past members: Paolo Panigada (Feiez)
- Website: elioelestorietese.it

Elio e le Storie Tese (Italian: [ˈɛːljo e lle ˈstɔːrje ˈteːze]; literally "Elio and the Troubled Stories"), often abbreviated EelST, is an Italian comedy rock band from Milan, formed in 1980. Their frontman is Stefano Belisari, better known as Elio.

Elio e le Storie Tese acquired national fame after their second-place finish at the Sanremo Music Festival 1996 with the song "La terra dei cachi", a humorous take on Italian lifestyle. They also won the "Mia Martini" Critics Awards for their performance.

In 1999, they were awarded as Best Italian Act at the MTV Europe Music Awards, and in 2003 they won the Best Italian Videoclip award at the Italian Music Awards of Federazione Industria Musicale Italiana for "Shpalman®". In 2011, they were elected as the best group band of the 2001–2010 decade through a referendum announced by the website Rockol. In 2012, the album Elio samaga hukapan kariyana turu has been ranked the 15th best Italian album of all time by the magazine Rolling Stone.

The group participated to the Sanremo Music Festival for the second time in the 2013 edition with the song "La canzone mononota", achieving again the second place and winning the "Mia Martini" Critics Awards for the second time, the award for the best arrangement, and the Radio and TV Press-Room award.

== History ==
The origins of Elio e le Storie Tese go back to the 1970s, when Stefano Belisari (Elio), Luca Mangoni and Marco Conforti (Sergio's brother and future manager of the group) were classmates in a high school in Milan.

The first line-up debuted in Milan in 1980. It consisted of Elio on guitar, Paolo Cortellino on bass and Pier Luigi Zuffellato on drums. Cortellino was then replaced firstly by Fabio Gianvecchio (Chiosco), later by Dario Mazzoli (Scaffale), and finally, in 1986, by Nicola Fasani (Faso). In the meantime, Zuffellato had left the group, and was replaced by Roberto Sgorbati (Cosma) until 1982, when, after EelST were joined by the pianist Sergio Conforti (Rocco Tanica), the role of drummer was filled by a Drumulator operated by Rocco Tanica himself until 1988, when Swiss drummer Christian Meyer joined the group.

At the beginning, Elio was the singer and guitarist, but in 1983 the group hired rock guitarist Davide Civaschi (Cesareo). From that moment on, Elio could focus on being the front-man, and, sparingly, play the Western concert flute, for which he had passed the music academy's examination. In 1988, the group was also joined by the multi-instrumentalist Paolo Panigada (Feiez), who died ten years later of a brain hemorrhage during a concert.

In 1992, Elio decided to include architect and former classmate Mangoni in the band. Mangoni, described in the official website as "artist and architect", would have various roles, such as dancing and singing during live performances.

The first studio album, Elio samaga hukapan kariyana turu was published in 1989, and it was followed by The Los Sri Lanka Parakramabahu Brothers Featuring Elio e le Storie Tese (1990), İtalyan, rum casusu çikti (1992), Esco dal mio corpo e ho molta paura: Gli inediti 1979–1986 (1993), Eat the Phikis (1996), Peerla (1998), Craccracriccrecr (1999), Cicciput (2003), Studentessi (2008) and L'album biango (2013). During their 35-year career, EelST have been awarded several prizes; they came second twice in the Sanremo Music Festival (in (1996 and 2013); they also won two "Mia Martini" Critics' Awards.

In March 2014, Elio e le Storie Tese presented six episodes of Il Musichione, a comedy musical show on Rai 2.

On 17 October 2017, the band announced that they would disband at the end of the year, after their last concert in Milan on 19 December.

On 16 December 2017, it was announced that the band would take part in the Sanremo Music Festival 2018 with the song Arrivedorci, i.e. "Arrivederci", meaning "See you later" in Italian; the song title is misspelled in the same way in which it was intentionally mispronounced in the Italian versions of Laurel and Hardy films, with a fake and exaggerated American accent (mostly for comic effect). The song, a slow ballad with a lyric consisting in a half-comical, half-serious concise recapitulation of their history, came last in the final chart and it was called by journalist and music critic Mario Luzzatto Fegiz "the ugliest song [they] ever wrote"; Elio, replying to Fegiz in an ambiguous attitude, stated that the band had made a calculated effort to classify last. A follow-up "Tour D'Addio" ("Farewell Tour") was announced for the Spring of 2018 starting on April 20 and ending on June 29. Later on, during a June 30, 2018 meet-and-greet in Barolo, for the tenth edition of its Collisioni rock music festival, Elio clarified that the main reasons behind the band's break-up were Tanica's recurring and continued absence from their stage performances during the previous years, for health reasons – namely depression (although the keyboardist never gave up his official membership in the band, by continuing to play keyboards and synths on their studio albums) – and a general tiredness within the band after their long career.

On 5 April 2022, Elio e le Storie Tese announced a reunion concert to be held in July of the same year. The purpose of the event is to raise funds to help Ukrainian refugees fleeing their country after the Russian invasion of Ukraine.

On 5 June 2023, the band announces, on Radio Deejay and on their own website, the resumption of live activities and an autumn tour in theaters with the show "Mi resta un solo dente e cerco di riavvitarlo" ("I have only one tooth left, and I'm trying to screw it back in") directed by Giorgio Gallione.

== Style ==
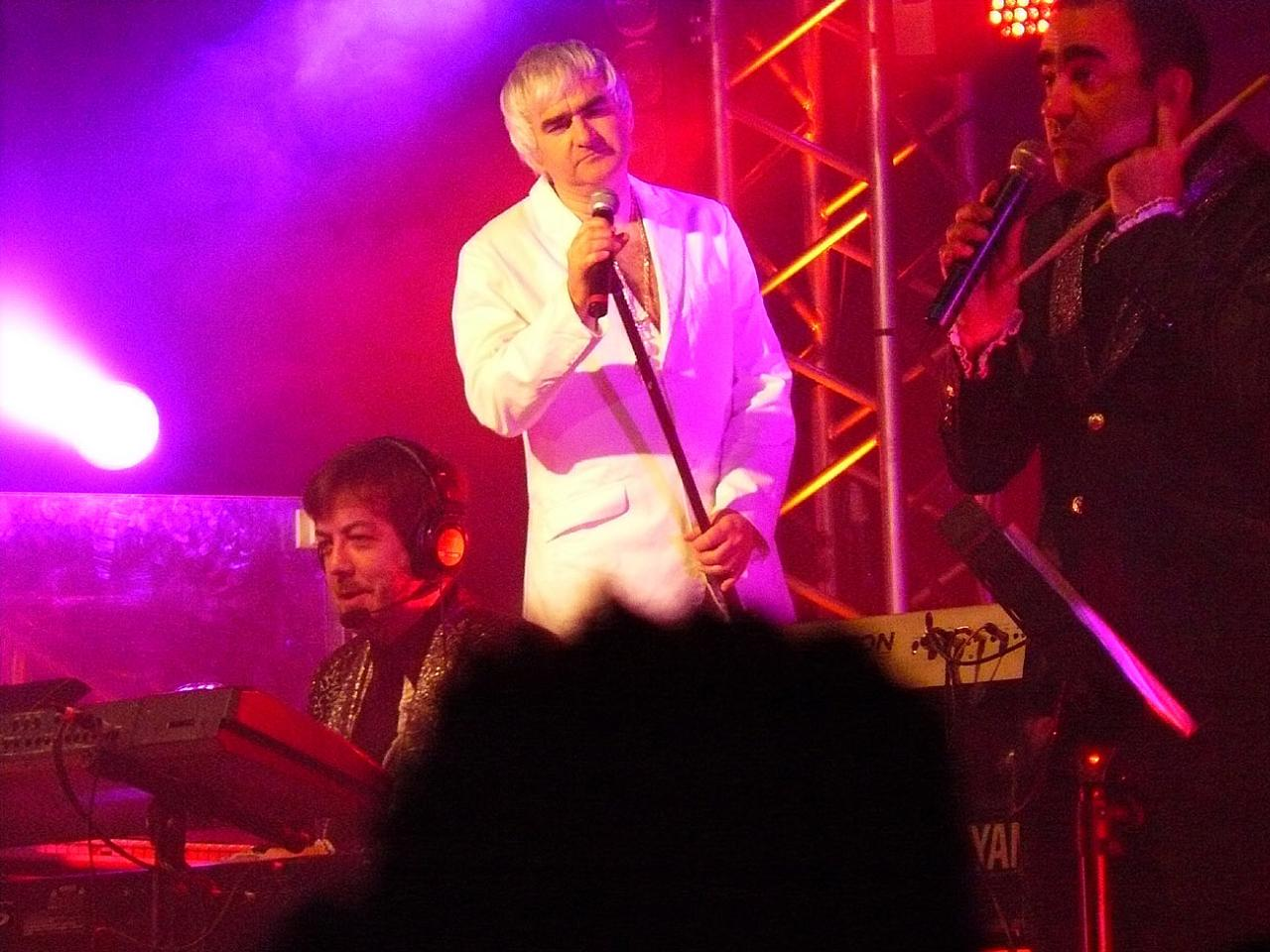
Rocco Tanica, Mangoni and Elio

The music of the group is openly inspired, among other sources, by the style of Frank Zappa, both in music and lyrics. Elio e le Storie Tese's musical work is characterized by eclecticism and competence, in the melodic, harmonic and orchestration (arrangement) aspects, augmented by the members' technical proficiency. They are widely considered as some of the best musicians in Italy. They are usually joined by an "unofficial" member, Mangoni (a former schoolmate of Elio and actually an architect), whose role is to dance, make choreographies or even sing during live shows on stage. In their official discography, and in their gigs, EelST have covered many of the genres typified in popular music: rock, Latin, progressive rock, disco and soul, to name a few. A very strong attitude to affectionately mock and modify to their needs the clichès of Italian pop music has always been part of their musical career, and nonetheless many Italian pop artists have been proud guests in their recordings, acknowledging their value. Their songs are typically interspersed by a rude, coarse humour which lies in stark contrast to their extreme varied and competent musical talent; once the band was considered part of the 'demential' rock underground spawned after the demise of punk and cross-fertilized by situationist dadaism, but they have soared well past above that scene. One of their favourite themes is adolescent life, seen as a golden period of fun, friendship, music and sexual discoveries.

The band has also been the first one, in 2004, to sell instant CDs of their live performances immediately after their end (which they dubbed CD brulé, as they were 'burned' on the spot, like mulled wine, in Italian "vin brulé").

== Line–ups ==
=== Members ===
- Stefano Belisari a.k.a. Elio – lead vocals, transverse flute, electric guitar, electric bass
- Sergio Conforti a.k.a. Rocco Tanica – vocals, keyboards, electronic drums, piano
- Nicola Fasani a.k.a. Faso – electric bass, backing vocals
- Davide Civaschi a.k.a. Cesareo – electric guitar, backing vocals
- Christian Meyer formerly a.k.a. Planibel, Pupillon, Millefinestre – drums, percussion
- Antonello Aguzzi a.k.a. Jantoman and formerly Uomo – keyboards, backing vocals (member since 1999)

=== "Unofficial" members ===
- Luca Mangoni – backing vocals, occasional lead vocals, onstage dancing
- Paola Folli – backing vocals
- Vittorio Cosma a.k.a. Clayderman Viganò – keyboards, backing vocals

=== Past members ===
- Paolo Panigada a.k.a. Feiez and formerly Mu Fogliasch (deceased in 1998) – backing vocals, saxophone, percussion, electric bass, guitar
- Paolo Cortellino a.k.a. Cortellino – bass
- Fabio Gianvecchio a.k.a. Chiosco – bass
- Dario Mazzoli a.k.a. Scaffale – bass
- Pier Luigi Zuffellato a.k.a. Zuffellato – drums
- Roberto Sgorbati a.k.a. Cosma – drums

== Discography ==
=== Studio albums ===
- Elio samaga hukapan kariyana turu (1989)
- The Los Sri Lanka Parakramabahu Brothers Featuring Elio e le Storie Tese (1990)
- İtalyan, rum casusu çikti (1992)
- Esco dal mio corpo e ho molta paura: Gli inediti 1979–1986 (1993)
- Eat the Phikis (1996)
- Peerla (1998)
- Craccracriccrecr (1999)
- Cicciput (2003)
- Studentessi (2008)
- L'album biango (2013)
- Figgatta de Blanc (2016)

=== Live albums ===
- Made in Japan (2001)
- Il meglio di Ho fatto due etti e mezzo, lascio? (2004, box)
- Il meglio di Grazie per la splendida serata (2005, box)
- Coèsi se vi pare (2006)
- Enlarge Your Penis - Live 2012 (2012)
- Il meglio di Emozioni Fortissime Tour 2007 (2013)
- Arrivedorci (2018)

=== Soundtracks ===
- Tutti gli uomini del deficiente (1999)

=== Compilations ===
- Del meglio del nostro meglio Vol. 1 (1997, greatest hits)
- E.L.I.O. – The Artists Formerly Known as Elio e le Storie Tese (1997, promotional album with previous songs translated in English)
- Baffo Natale Compilation – Le canzoni di Natale di Radio DeeJay (2005)
- The Original Recordings 1990/2003 (2007, unauthorized by the band)
- Gattini (2009, rerecorded versions with orchestra of previous tracks + 1 new song)
- Yes, We Can't (2017)

=== Singles ===
- "Nubi di ieri sul nostro domani odierno (Abitudinario)" (1989)
- "Born to Be Abramo" (1990)
- "Born to Be Abramo (Saturday Night strage)" (1990)
- "Servi della gleba" (1992)
- "Pipppero®" (1992)
- "Pipppero® (English version)" (1992)
- "Not Unpreviously Unreleased'nt" (1993)
- "Entra in Esco dal mio corpo e ho molta paura" (1993)
- "(Gomito a gomito con l') Aborto / In te" (1993)
- "Nessuno allo stadio" (1994)
- "Nessuno allo stadio – Strike remix" (1994)
- "Christmas with the Yours" (1995)
- "La terra dei cachi" (1996)
- "La terra dei cachi – Prezioso remix" (1996)
- "La terra dei cachi (The Rimini Tapes)" (1996)
- "T.V.U.M.D.B. / Mio cuggino" (1996)
- "El Pube" (1996)
- "Born to be Abramo (avec Patrick Hernandez)" (1997)
- "L'eterna lotta tra il bene e il male" (1998)
- "Evviva/La visione" (1999)
- "Bis" (1999)
- "Discomusic" (1999)
- "La bella canzone di una volta" (1999)
- "Presidance®" (1999)
- "La gente vuole il gol" (2000)
- "Fave Club" (2000)
- "Che felicità" (2000)
- "Tapparella" (2001)
- "Fave strapazzate" (2002)
- "Shpalman®" (2003)
- "Shpalman® RMX" (2003)
- "Fossi figo" (2003)
- "Oratorium" (2004)
- "Valzer transgenico" (2006)
- "Banane giganti" (2006)
- "Presepio imminente" (2006)
- "Enrico va a scuola" (2007)
- "Parco Sempione" (2008)
- "Ignudi fra i nudisti" (2008)
- "Storia di un bellimbusto" (2009)
- "Pensiero stupesce" (2011)
- "Sta arrivando la fine del mondo" (2012)
- "Dannati forever" (2013)
- "La canzone mononota" (2013)
- "Complesso del primo maggio" (2013)
- "Amore amorissimo" (2013)
- "Il Musichione" (2014)
- "Alcol snaturato (una serata speciale)" (2015)
- "Il primo giorno di scuola" (2015)
- "Vincere l'odio" (2016)
- "Il mistero dei bulli" (2016)
- "Vacanza alternativa/China disco bar/Bomba intelligente (2016)
- "Licantropo vegano" (2017)
- "Arrivedorci" (2018)
