= The Los Sri Lanka Parakramabahu Brothers Featuring Elio e le Storie Tese =

Single by Elio e le Storie Tese
- Released: 1990
- Genre: Comedy rock
- Length: 33:27
- Label: Psycho; Epic Records
- Producer(s): Otar Bolivecic

Elio e le Storie Tese singles chronology
"'Elio samaga hukapan kariyana turu'" (1989)	"The Los Sri Lanka Parakramabahu Brothers Featuring Elio e le Storie Tese" (1990)	"'İtalyan, rum casusu çikti'" (1992)

The Los Sri Lanka Parakramabahu Brothers Featuring Elio e le Storie Tese is a maxi single by Italian rock band Elio e le Storie Tese.

The title refers to Elio e le Storie Tese pretending that two Sri Lankan people, who were called to clean the rehearsal studio, are the actual authors of the album. The single was publicized at the time as a full-length album, although the band has always intended it as a special Christmas single.

== Track listing ==
1. "Introducing the Real Pulun Vage Sudu Raula Digay" – 1:00
2. "Pulun Vage Sudu Raula Digay" – 1:08
3. "Outroducing the Real Pulun Vage Raula Digay" – 0:27
4. "Agnello Medley" – 2:35
5. "Parakramabahu Rajatuma (Live in concertino)" – 3:06
6. "Natale in casa Wizzent" – 5:54
7. "Silos (Live in concertino)" – 4:21
8. "Raccomando" – 2:12

Bonus tracks only included in the CD version of the album

1. "Giocatore mondiale" – 7:05
2. "Born to be Abramo (Saturday Night Strage)" – 5:35
