= Cesareo =

Cesareo or Cesáreo is a given name. Notable people with the given name include:

- Cesáreo Bernaldo de Quirós (1879–1968), Argentine painter
- Cesáreo Gabaráin (1936–1991), Spanish priest and composer
- Cesareo Guillermo (1847–1885), Dominican politician
- Cesáreo Onzari (1903–1964), Argentine footballer
- Cesáreo Quezadas (born 1950), Mexican actor
- Cesáreo Victorino (born 1979), Mexican footballer
- Cesáreo Victorino (1947–1999), Mexican footballer
- Davide Civaschi, a.k.a. Cesàreo, Italian rock guitarist, member of Elio e le Storie Tese
