= Elio (Italian singer) =

Italian singer

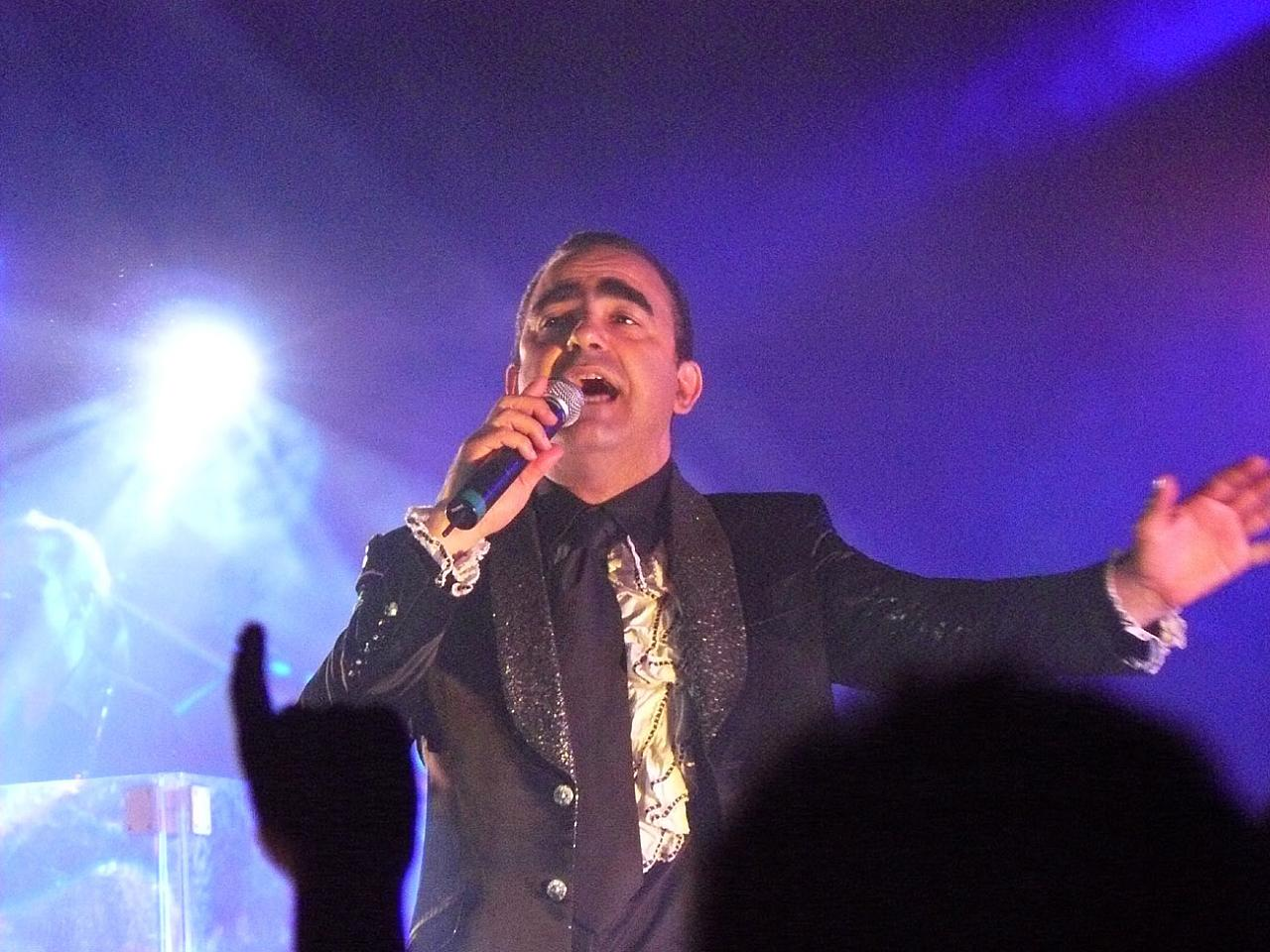
Elio during a live performance

Stefano Belisari (born 30 July 1961 in Milan), nicknamed Elio, is an Italian singer, comedian, actor and musician. He is a founding member of the Italian rock band Elio e le Storie Tese.

== Career ==
Elio founded Elio e le Storie Tese in 1980. He is the lead vocalist and occasionally plays the transverse flute (in which he is a graduate of the Milan Conservatory), the electric guitar and the electric bass.

In 2002, Elio graduated from the Polytechnic University of Milan with an MSc in electronic engineering. He had previously interrupted his studies following the success of his music career.

The texts of his songs are humorous and irreverent, and he listed Frank Zappa as a primary influence.

He has been a judge on the panel of the Italian version of The X Factor for five seasons, winning two of them through acts he mentored, Nathalie (season 4, 2010) and Giò Sada (season 9, 2015). He was also a judge at Italia's Got Talent in 2022.

== Filmography ==
Year	Title	Role	Notes	Ref.
1999	Asini	Tomalino		
2004	Terkel in Trouble	Arne Nougatgren	Voice (Italian dub)	
2011	Paul	Paul	Voice (Italian dub)	
2013	Ci vuole un gran fisico	Gino		
2013	Il sole dei cattivi			
2013	Cloudy with a Chance of Meatballs 2	Chester V	Voice (Italian dub)	
2015	La ragazza Carla	Elio		
2019	UglyDolls	Ox	Voice (Italian dub)	
2023	Improvvisamente a Natale mi sposo	The Mayor		
2024	Gloria!	Romeo		
