= Ma se ghe penso =

Song by Luisa Rondolotti
- Language: Genoese
- English title: "But if I think about it"
- Published: 1925
- Composer(s): Mario Cappello, Attilio Margutti
- Lyricist(s): Mario Cappello

"Ma se ghe penso" (Note: Sometimes written "Ma se ghe pensu", although this is based on Italian-language sound-to-spelling correspondences.) (pronounced [ma se ɡe ˈpeŋsu]; "But if I think about it") is a song in the Genoese dialect of Ligurian. It has a central role in the folklore of the Italian city of Genoa and is commonly quoted as one of its symbols. The song was written by Mario Cappello, with Attilio Margutti having helped with the music. "Ma se ghe penso" was launched in 1925. Its first performance was by soprano Luisa Rondolotti, in Genoa's Teatro Orfeo.

Its lyrics speak of a Genoese emigrant to Latin America, who is thinking of coming back to his city. Notwithstanding his child's opposition, he finally goes back to Genoa.

== Recordings ==
Other well known interpretations were that of Giuseppe Marzari and that, not sung but recited, of Gilberto Govi. In 1967 Mina reinterpreted the song. The song was also performed multiple times throughout the 1970s by Genoese quartet Ricchi e Poveri. "Ma se ghe penso" was also performed by Neapolitan singer Massimo Ranieri (together with Genoese showmen Luca Bizzarri and Paolo Kessisoglu) during the Sanremo Music Festival 2011.

== Lyrics ==
O l'êa partîo sensa 'na palanca,
l'êa zâ trent'anni, fòrse anche ciù.
O l'aveiva lotòu pe mette i dinæ a-a banca
e poèisene un giorno vegnî in zù
e fâse a palasinn-a e o giardinetto,
co-o ranpicante, co-a cantinn-a e o vin,
a branda atacâ a-i èrboi, a ûzo létto,
pe dâghe 'na schenâ séia e matin.

Ma o figgio o ghe dixeiva: «No ghe pensâ
a Zêna, cöse ti ghe veu tornâ?!»
Ma se ghe penso alôa mi veddo o mâ,
veddo i mæ monti, a ciassa da Nonçiâ,
riveddo o Righi e me s'astrenze o cheu,
veddo a lanterna, a cava, lazù o Meu...

Riveddo a-a séia Zêna iluminâ,
veddo là a Fôxe e sento franze o mâ
e alôa mi penso ancon de ritornâ
a pösâ e òsse dôve ò mæ madonâ.

E l'êa pasòu do tenpo, fòrse tròppo,
o figgio o l'inscisteiva: «Stemmo ben,
dôve ti veu andâ, papà?.. pensiêmo dòppo,
o viâgio, o mâ, t'ê vêgio, no conven!».

«Oh no, oh no! me sento ancon in ganba,
son stùffo e no ne pòsso pròpio ciû,
son stanco de sentî señor caramba,
mi véuggio ritornâmene ancon in zù…
Ti t'ê nasciûo e t'æ parlòu spagnòllo,
mi son nasciûo zeneize e… no me mòllo!».

Ma se ghe penso alôa mi veddo o mâ,
veddo i mæ monti, a ciassa da Nonçiâ,
riveddo o Righi e me s'astrenze o cheu,
veddo a lanterna, a cava, lazù o Meu…
Riveddo a-a séia Zêna iluminâ,
veddo là a Fôxe e sento franze o mâ
e alôa mi penso ancon de ritornâ
a pösâ e òsse dôve ò mæ madonâ.

E sensa tante cöse o l'é partîo
e a Zêna o gh'à formòu torna o so nîo.

He had left without a single penny,
already thirty years ago, perhaps even more.
He had struggled to put his money in a bank
and to be able to come back some day
and to build his little house and his little garden
with a creeper, a cellar and the wine,
with a hammock tied to the trees to use it as a bed,
to rest on it in the evening and morning.

But his son told him «Don't think about
Genoa, do you really want to go back there?!»
But if I think about it, then I see the sea,
I see my mountains, the Annunziata square
I see Righi again, and I feel a pang in my heart,
I see the Lighthouse, the cave and the Dock down there…

I see again Genoa by night, illuminated,
I see the Mouth [of the Bisagno] on the shore and I hear the sea dashing,
and then I think to go back again
to lay my bones where my grandmother is.

And a lot of time passed, perhaps too much,
his son insisted: «We're fine here,
where do you want to go, dad? we'll think about it later:
the travel, the sea, you're old… better not to!»

«Oh no, oh no! I'm still good to go,
I'm fed up, I can't stand it anymore,
I'm tired of hearing señor caramba
I want to go back again there…
You were born and spoke Spanish,
I was born Genoan and… I don't give up!»

But if I think about it, then I see the sea,
I see my mountains, the Annunziata square,
I see Righi again, and I feel a pang in my heart,
I see the Lighthouse, the cave and the Dock down there…
I see again Genoa by night, illuminated,
I see the Mouth on the shore and I hear the sea dashing,
and then I think to go back again
to lay my bones where my grandmother is.

And without any fuss he departed
and in Genoa he built his nest again.
