= Parigi o cara =

Parigi o cara may refer to:

- "Parigi, o cara" (Verdi), a duet from Act 3 of the opera La traviata by Giuseppe Verdi
- Parigi o cara (film), or Paris, My Love, a 1962 Italian film
- "Parigi (o cara)", a 1982 song by Roberto Vecchioni from Hollywood Hollywood
