= Bei tempi =

Studio album by Roberto Vecchioni
- Released: 1985
- Genre: World, Pop
- Length: 35 min 35s
- Label: CGD
- Producer: Michelangelo Romano

Roberto Vecchioni chronology
Il grande sogno (1984)	Bei tempi (1985)	Ippopotami (1986)

Bei tempi is an album by an Italian singer-songwriter Roberto Vecchioni, released in 1985.

== Track listing ==
- All arrangements by Peppe Vessicchio, except tracks 4, 6 and 8 (Mauro Paoluzzi)
1. "Bei tempi" ("Good Times"; Roberto Vecchioni, Roberto Morandi) 4:57
2. "Livingstone" (Vecchioni, Michelangelo Romano) 3:12
3. "La mia ragazza" ("My Girlfriend"; Vecchioni, Romano) 4:56
4. "Piccolo amore" ("Little Love"; Vecchioni) 4:40
5. "Gastone e Astolfo" (Vecchioni) 2:30
6. "Millenovantanove" ("One thousand ninety-nine"; Vecchioni) 6:26
7. "Fata" (Vecchioni, Romano) 5:56
8. "Fratel Coniglietto" (Vecchioni) 3:02
