= Roberto Vecchioni =

Italian singer, songwriter, and lyricist (born 1943)

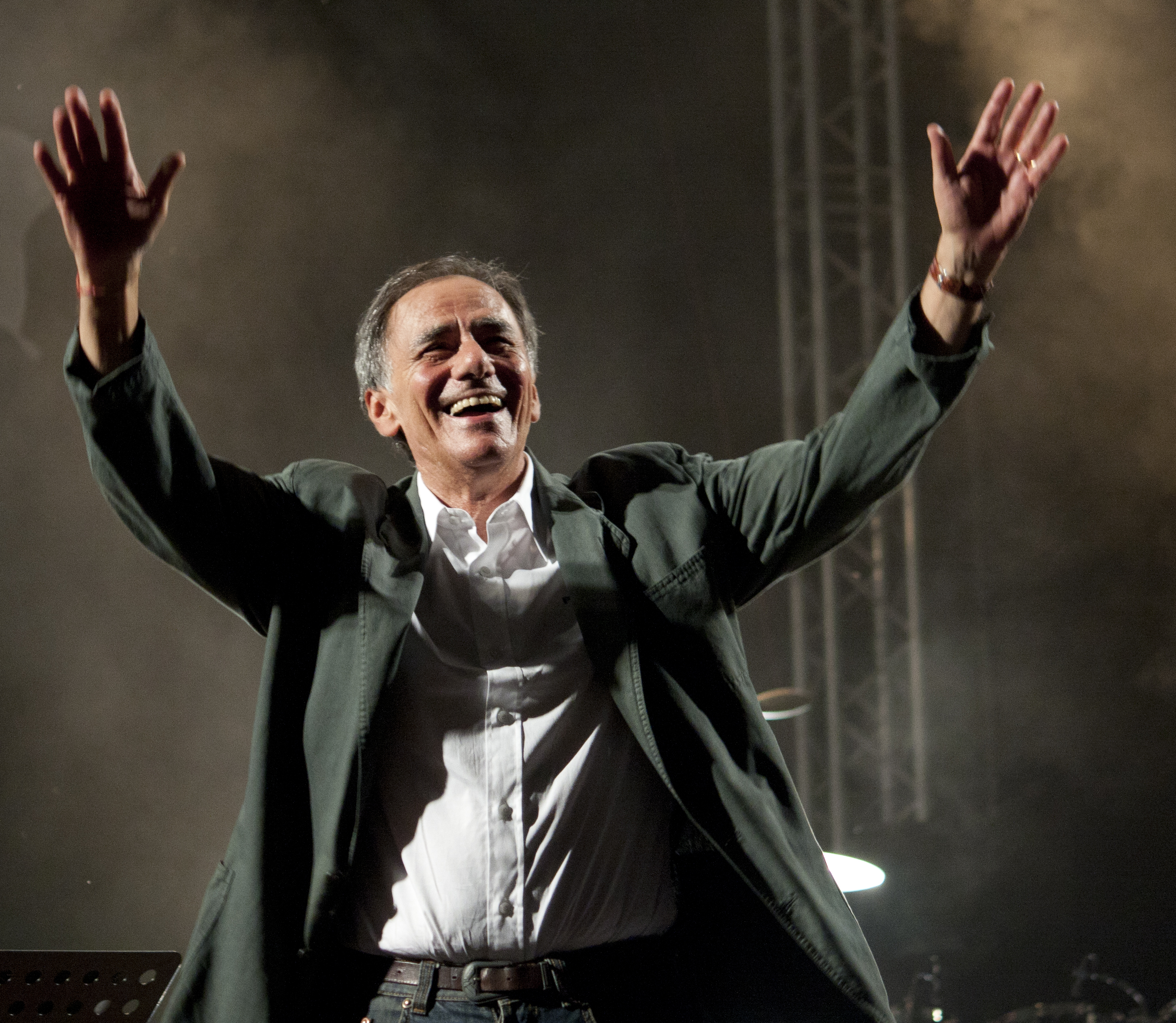
- Vecchioni in 2011

Background information
- Born: 25 June 1943 (age 83); Carate Brianza, Lombardy, Kingdom of Italy
- Genres: Rock; folk rock; pop; MOR; musica d'autore
- Occupations: Lyricist; composer; singer; songwriter; poet
- Years active: 1966–present
- Labels: Durium; Italdisc; Ducale; Philips; Ciao; CGD; EMI
- Website: www.robertovecchioni.com

Roberto Vecchioni (Italian pronunciation: [roˈbɛrto vekˈkjoːni]; born 25 June 1943) is an Italian singer, songwriter, and lyricist.

== Biography ==
Vecchioni was born in Carate Brianza, now in the province of Monza and Brianza, to a Neapolitan family. In 1968, he graduated in Classical Literature at the Catholic University of Milan, where he subsequently worked for two years as assistant lecturer of History of Religion. Later he was appointed professor of literature and history at a Milanese High School, an activity that he continued for almost thirty years and that would influence several of his songs.

His career in the Italian music industry began in the late 1960s as songwriter for Italian pop stars such as Ornella Vanoni, Gigliola Cinquetti, Mina, Iva Zanicchi and the band Nuovi Angeli. Vecchioni's first solo album, Parabola was released in 1971. In 1973 he took part in the Sanremo Festival with "L'uomo che si gioca il cielo a dadi". His 1974 LP, Il re non si diverte, won the Best Year's Album Award from the Italian music critic. In 1976 he released Elisir. Vecchioni's breakthrough happened in 1977 with Samarcanda, an album where he drew inspiration mostly from autobiographical themes, intermingled with dreamy, literary, historical and mythological references. Angelo Branduardi played violin on the LP.

Vecchioni's skills were confirmed in the following works, Calabuig, Stranamore e altri incidenti (1978), where the literary citations predominated, and in Robinson (1979), where instead the autobiographical inspiration prevails. The songs "Signor giudice" and "Lettera da Marsala" of the latter work deal with the problems Vecchioni had had in the preceding years: respectively, a charge for marijuana possession (from which he was acquitted) and a dispute with his former record label. The following album, Montecristo, was released indeed by both the old and the new labels.

After Hollywood Hollywood of 1982, whose songs are influenced by the world of cinema, Vecchioni in 1984 released the double LP Il grande sogno ("The Great Dream"), in which he collected new songs together with new versions of his past hits. The title track featured Francesco De Gregori playing blues harp. The LP was accompanied by his first literary attempt, a short book with the same name. Many of the cover of Vecchioni's LPs of this period were created by the famous Italian comic book artist and painter Andrea Pazienza.

While continuing a successful career as a renowned singer-songwriter in the 1980s and the 1990s, Vecchioni spent more time writing. His prose includes the collection Viaggi nel tempo immobile (1996) and the novels Le parole non-portano le cicogne (2000) and Il libraio di Selinunte. He also lectured on the History of Italian Songwriting in a tour lasting two years, and was called to author the Enciclopedia Treccani article about Italian singer-songwriters. His best more recent works include Sogna ragazzo sogna ("Dream, boy, dream") of 1999 and Il lanciatore di coltelli ("The Knife Thrower") of 2002. In 1993, Litfiba guitarist Ghigo Renzulli collaborated with him on the album Blumùn, being signed as a musician to the same record label as him, EMI..

On 19 February 2011, he won the 61st Sanremo Music Festival and the "Mia Martini" Critics' Award with the song "Chiamami ancora amore" ("Call me Love again").

He identifies as Christian.

== Discography ==
- Parabola (1971)
- Saldi di fine stagione (1972)
- Il re non-si diverte (1974)
- Barbapapà (1975)
- Ipertensione (1975)
- Elisir (1976)
- Samarcanda (1977)
- Robinson (1980)
- Calabuig, stranamore e altri incidenti (1978)
- Montecristo (1980)
- Hollywood Hollywood (1982)
- Il grande sogno (1984)
- Live @ RTSI (1984, live)
- Bei tempi (1985)
- Ippopotami (1986)
- Milady (1989)
- Per amore mio (1991)
- Camper (1992, live collection)
- Blumùn (1993)
- Il cielo capovolto (1995)
- Vecchioni studio collection (1997)
- El bandolero stanco (1997)
- Sogna ragazzo sogna (1999)
- Canzoni e cicogne (2000, live collection)
- Il lanciatore di coltelli (2002)
- Le ballate (2002)
- Rotary Club of Malindi (2004)
- Il contastorie (2005, double live collection)
- Di rabbia e di stelle (2007)
- In Cantus (2009, live collection)
- Chiamami ancora amore (2011)
- Io non-appartengo più (2013)

== Bibliography ==
- Viaggi nel tempo immobile (1996, collection of short novels), Einaudi, Turin
- Le parole non-potrano le cicogne (2000), Einaudi, Turin
- Il libraio di Selinunte (2004), Einaudi, Turin
- Diario di un gatto con gli stivali (2006), Einaudi, Turin
- Di sogni e d'amore (2007), Frassinelli, Segrate
- Volevo. Ed erano voli (2008), Pescecapone, Lecce
- Scacco a Dio (2009), Einaudi, Turin

Awards and achievements
Preceded by Valerio Scanu with "Per tutte le volte che..."	Sanremo Music Festival; Winner; 2011	Succeeded by Emma with "Non è l'inferno"
