= The Choice (2015 film) =

2015 film by Michele Placido

- Directed by: Michele Placido
- Screenplay by: Michele Placido; Giulia Calenda
- Based on: L'innesto, a 1917 play by Luigi Pirandello
- Produced by: Andrea Ricciardi
- Starring: Raoul Bova; Ambra Angiolini; Michele Placido; Valeria Solarino
- Cinematography: Arnaldo Catinari
- Edited by: Esmeralda Calabria
- Music by: Luca d'Albero
- Production company: Goldenart
- Distributed by: Lucky Red Distribuzione
- Release date: 2 April 2015
- Running time: 86 min
- Country: Italy
- Language: Italian

The Choice (Italian: La scelta) is a 2015 Italian drama film directed by Michele Placido, starring Raoul Bova, Ambra Angiolini, Valeria Solarino and Placido. It is based on the play Grafted (L'innesto) by Luigi Pirandello. It was released in Italy on 2 April 2015 through Lucky Red Distribuzione.

== Plot summary ==
Giorgio and Laura live a difficult loving relationship, because she wants a child, while Giorgio is very indecisive. One night, Laura is returning home after a party, and is attacked and raped. After a few months Laura discovers she is pregnant, and Giorgio is desperate. However, the two reflect on the situation, and they think the bastard child can be the key to their future happiness.

== Cast ==
- Raoul Bova as Giorgio
- Ambra Angiolini as Laura
- Valeria Solarino as Francesca
- Michele Placido as Emilio Nicotri

== Production ==
The project was first presented at the Co-production Village at the Les Arcs Film Festival in 2012. The film was produced by Goldenart and was in post-production in August 2014.

== Accolades ==
Italian National Syndicate of Film Journalists - Best Actress - Ambra Angiolini (nominee)

== See also ==
- List of Italian films of 2013
