= Samarcanda (album) =

Studio album by Roberto Vecchioni
- Released: 1977
- Genre: singer-songwriter, pop rock
- Length: 39 min 27 s
- Label: Philips
- Producer: Michelangelo Romano

Roberto Vecchioni chronology
Elisir (1976)	Samarcanda (1977)	Calabuig, stranamore e altri incidenti (1978)

Samarcanda is an album by Italian singer-songwriter Roberto Vecchioni, released in 1977. The work was highly successful, mostly thanks to the title track, and established him as one of the most popular singer-songwriters in Italy.

As usual for Vecchioni, the lyrics mix autobiographical themes such as love life, nostalgia with literary and poetical ones.

"Samarcanda", is inspired to an Oriental fable (sometimes called "Appointment in Samarra") and is about a soldier who, in a feast to celebrate the end of the war, sees Death in the form of an old woman amongst the crowd. He madly rides to Samarkand to escape, and finds her there waiting for him.

"Vaudeville", a satirical song about a singer-songwriter being shot on stage, is a reference to the "trial" suffered during a concert held the previous year by Vecchioni's colleague Francesco De Gregori, as well as to the perception at the time of singer-songwriters in Italy.

"Due giornate fiorentine" is about Vecchioni's first wife, Irene Bozzi, betraying him.

"Blu(e) notte" is about Vecchioni meeting the poet Sandro Penna.

"Per un vecchio bambino" (meaning "For an old child") is dedicated to Vecchioni's father.

"Canzone per Sergio" is instead named after Vecchioni's brother, a notary in Lipari.

"L'ultimo spettacolo" is a long ballad beginning with a slow motif about Homer's heroes, but finishing with more dramatic lyrics describing the departure of Vecchioni's wife to meet her lover. The episode of the singer accompanying her to the platform of the train to Turin will reappear in several of his future songs, such as "Vorrei" (in the album Robinson) and Montecristo (in the Lp with the same name).

Angelo Branduardi, also a popular singer-songwriter, appears as musician in the LP.

== Track listing ==
1. "Prologo" – 1:04
2. "Samarcanda" – 3:42
3. "Vaudeville" – 1:46
4. "Due giornate fiorentine" – 6:45
5. "Blu(e) notte" – 4:14
6. "Per un vecchio bambino" – 7:41
7. "Canzone per Sergio" – 5:24
8. "L'ultimo spettacolo" – 8:27
