= Da grandi =

2023 Italian comedy film directed by Fausto Brizzi

- Directed by: Fausto Brizzi
- Screenplay by: Fausto Brizzi; Franco Amurri
- Produced by: Roberto Proia
- Starring: Enrico Brignano; Ilenia Pastorelli; Luca Bizzarri; Paolo Kessisoglu
- Cinematography: Federico Annicchiarico
- Edited by: Luciana Pandolfelli
- Music by: Andrea Bonini
- Production companies: Eagle Pictures; Material Pictures
- Distributed by: Eagle Pictures; Prime Video
- Release date: 28 June 2023
- Running time: 104 minutes
- Country: Italy
- Language: Italian

Da grandi is a 2023 Italian fantasy comedy film directed by Fausto Brizzi and written by Brizzi and Franco Amurri. A remake of the 1987 film Da grande, it stars Enrico Brignano, Ilenia Pastorelli, Luca Bizzarri and Paolo Kessisoglu.

== Cast ==
- Enrico Brignano as adult Marco
- Ilenia Pastorelli as adult Serena
- Luca Bizzarri as adult Leo
- Paolo Kessisoglu as adult Tato
- Valeria Bilello as Francesca
- Claudia Potenza as Anna
- Luca Angeletti as Carlo
- Carlotta Natoli as the police commissioner
- Marco Messeri as Giuseppe, Leo's grandfather
- Valeria Fabrizi as Teresa, Leo's grandmother
- Mattia Manfredonia as child Marco
- Alice Simoni as child Serena
- Daniel Perniciano as child Leo
- Leone Cardaci as child Tato
- Alyssa Palmese as child Francesca
- Ilary Mancini as Silvietta
- Gabriele Pignotta as Claudio
- Francesca Nerozzi as Milena
- Ubaldo Pantani as the school principal

== Release ==
The film was released on Amazon Prime Video on 28 June 2023.
