= Fernanda Pivano =

Italian writer, journalist, translator and literary critic (1917–2009)

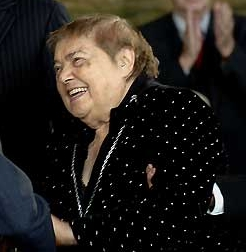
Fernanda Pivano in 2006

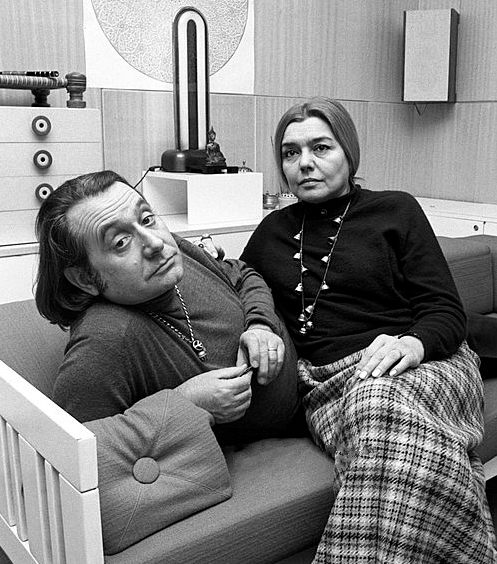
Fernanda Pivano with husband Ettore Sottsass at their home in Milan, 1969

Fernanda Pivano (18 July 1917 – 18 August 2009) was an Italian writer, journalist, translator and critic.

== Early life ==
Pivano was born in Genoa in 1917. When she was a teenager she moved with her family to Turin where she attended the Massimo D'Azeglio Lyceum. There she met Cesare Pavese, who introduced her and her classmate Primo Levi to American literature. In 1941 she received a laurea with a thesis on Herman Melville's Moby-Dick, which earned her a prize from the Center for American Studies in Rome.

== Spoon River ==
In 1943 she obtained a second degree in philosophy. In the same year she completed her first translation, the Italian edition of the Spoon River Anthology by Edgar Lee Masters for Einaudi.

[...] "I was just a kid when I read Spoon River for the first time: Cesare Pavese brought it to me, one morning when I had asked him what was the difference between American and English literature."

== Career ==
In 1949, Pivano met Ernest Hemingway. It turned out to be the beginning of an intense professional relationship and friendship that would last until Hemingway's death in 1961. In 1949 Mondadori published her translation of Hemingway's A Farewell to Arms. (Citation/clarification needed. See A Farewell to Arms.) In the same year Pivano married designer and architect Ettore Sottsass and moved to Milan, where she would live for the rest of her life. Pivano made her first trip to the United States in 1956 and throughout her professional life she contributed to the diffusion of the most significant American writers in Italy, from the great icons of the Roaring Twenties, like F. Scott Fitzgerald, Dorothy Parker and William Faulkner, through the writers of the 1960s (Allen Ginsberg, Jack Kerouac, William S. Burroughs, Gregory Corso, Lawrence Ferlinghetti), to young contemporary writers including Jay McInerney, Bret Easton Ellis, David Foster Wallace, Chuck Palahniuk and Jonathan Safran Foer. Pivano was also interested in African-American culture. In 1949 she met Richard Wright in Paris and went on to translate and edit many of his novels. In 1980 and 1984, Pivano interviewed Charles Bukowski at his home in San Pedro, California. These interviews became the basis for her book, Charles Bukowski: Laughing with the Gods first published in the United States by Sun Dog Press in 2000.

In the summer of 2001 Pivano toured Northern America with director Luca Facchinito to film the documentary A Farewell to Beat – a celebration of the Beat Generation featuring notable American writers, including Jay McInerney, Bret Easton Ellis and Lawrence Ferlinghetti written by Andrea Bempensante.

Pivano also wrote about popular music and was an admirer of the work of Fabrizio de André and Bob Dylan. In 2006 Pivano decided to revisit the Spoon River Anthology in the book Spoon River, ciao (Dreams Creek, 2006), a selection of her unpublished texts about the pictures taken by American photographer William Willinghton in the same locations described by Edgar Lee Masters in the Anthology.

== Death ==
Fernanda Pivano died, aged 92, in Milan on August 18, 2009. Her funeral took place on August 21 in the Basilica di Carignano in Genoa. After the cremation, she was buried in the cemetery of Staglieno.

== Legacy ==
In March 2010, Bompiani published Diari/2, the second volume of her biography that collects her writings from 1974 to 2009.

== Bibliography ==
- 1947: La balena bianca e altri miti, Mondadori.
- 1964: America rossa e nera, Vallecchi.
- 1972: Beat Hippie Yippie, Arcana.
- 1976: Mostri degli Anni Venti, Formichieri.
- 1976: C'era una volta un Beat, Arcana.
- 1971: L'altra America negli Anni Sessanta, Officine Formichieri.
- 1982: Intervista a Bukowski, Sugar.
- 1985: Biografia di Hemingway, Rusconi.
- 1986: Cos'è più la virtù, Rusconi.
- 1988: La mia kasbah, Rusconi.
- 1955: La balena bianca e altri miti, Il Saggiatore.
- 1996: Altri amici, Mondadori.
- 1996: Amici scrittori, Mondadori.
- 2001: Hemingway, Rusconi.
- 1997: Dov'è più la virtù, Marsilio.
- 1997: Viaggio americano, Bompiani.
- 1997: Album americano. Dalla generazione perduta agli scrittori della realtà virtuale, Frassinelli.
- 2000: I miei quadrifogli, Frassinelli.
- 2000: Dopo Hemingway. Libri, arte ed emozioni d’America, Pironti.
- 2001: Una favola, Pagine d'arte.
- 2002: Un po' di emozioni, Fandango.
- 2002: Mostri degli anni Venti, La Tartaruga.
- 2002: De André il corsaro, with Cesare G. Romana and Michele Serra, Interlinea.
- 2004: The beat goes on, Mondadori.
- 2006: Spoon River, ciao with photographs by William Willinghton, Dreams Creek.
- 2006: Ho fatto una pace separata, Dreams Creek.
- 2007: Lo scrittore americano e la ragazza perbene, Tullio Pironti Editore.
- 2008: Complice la musica, BUR.
- 2008: Diari (1917–1973), edited by Enrico Rotelli with Mariarosa Bricchi, Bompiani.
- 2010: Diari/2 (1974–2009), edited by Enrico Rotelli with Mariarosa Bricchi, Bompiani.
- 2010: Libero chi legge, Mondadori.
- 2011: Leggende americane, Bompiani.

== Prizes ==
- 1964: Saint Vincent Prize for Journalism
- 1975: Monselice Prize for Translation
- 1983: San Gerolamo Prize
- 1985: Giovanni Comisso Prize for literature
- 1992: Mondello Prize
- 1998: Estense Prize
- 2002: Art, Science and Peace Prize
- 2003: Grinzane Cavour Prize
- 2005: Tenco Prize
- 2006: Vittorio De Sica Prize for literature

== See also ==
- Edgar Lee Masters
- Spoon River Anthology
- Fabrizio De André
