= Sanremo Music Festival 2011 =

Italian song contest (61st edition)

Dates and venue
- Semi-final 1: 15 February 2011
- Semi-final 2: 16 February 2011
- Semi-final 3: 17 February 2011
- Semi-final 4: 18 February 2011
- Final: 19 February 2011
- Venue: Teatro Ariston; Sanremo, Italy

Production
- Broadcaster: Radiotelevisione italiana (RAI)
- Director: Duccio Forzano
- Musical director: Marco Sabiu
- Artistic director: Gianmarco Mazzi
- Presenters: Gianni Morandi and Luca Bizzarri, Paolo Kessisoglu, Belén Rodríguez, Elisabetta Canalis

Vote
- Voting system: Mixed (televotes, jury and orchestra votes)

Big Artists section
- Number of entries: 14
- Winner: "Chiamami ancora amore" Roberto Vecchioni

Newcomers' section
- Number of entries: 8
- Winner: "Follia d'amore" Raphael Gualazzi

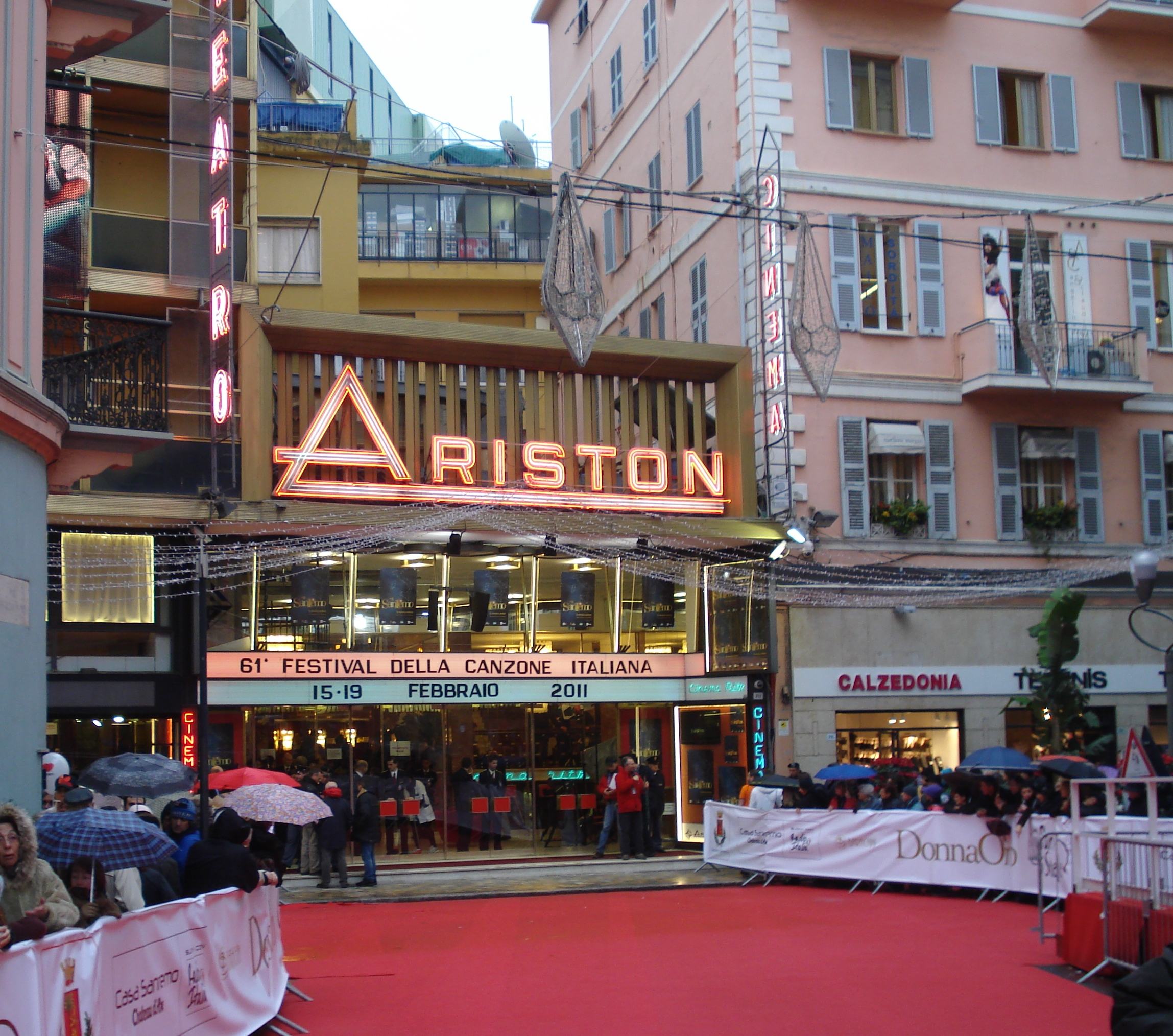
The Teatro Ariston, traditional venue of the festival, during the 2011 edition

The Sanremo Music Festival 2011 (Italian: Festival di Sanremo 2011), officially the 61st Italian Song Festival (61º Festival della canzone italiana), was the 61st annual Sanremo Music Festival, held at the Teatro Ariston in Sanremo between 15 and 19 February 2011 and broadcast by Radiotelevisione italiana (RAI). The festival was presented by singer Gianni Morandi with Paolo Kessisoglu, Luca Bizzarri, Belén Rodríguez and Elisabetta Canalis, while artistic director was Gianmarco Mazzi.

The competition was divided in two sections. The Big Artists section, including 14 established Italian artists, was won by Roberto Vecchioni with the song "Chiamami ancora amore", while the Newcomers section was won by Raphael Gualazzi, performing "Follia d'amore".

For the first time since 1997, the festival also served as the Italian national selection for the Eurovision Song Contest 2011, with the country returning to the competition after being absent for 13 editions. The Italian entry, also "Follia d'amore" by Gualazzi (in a new version titled "Madness of Love"), was chosen among the contestants by a specific jury, composed of Gianni Morandi, Rai 1 director Mauro Mazza, Rai 2 director Massimo Liofredi, the mayor of Sanremo Maurizio Zoccarato, the municipality's promotional board member Giorgio Giuffra and director of international affairs Marco Simeon.

== Presenters and personnel ==
Sanremo Music Festival 2011 presenters

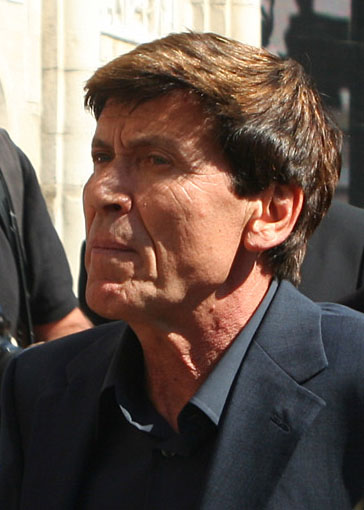
Gianni Morandi

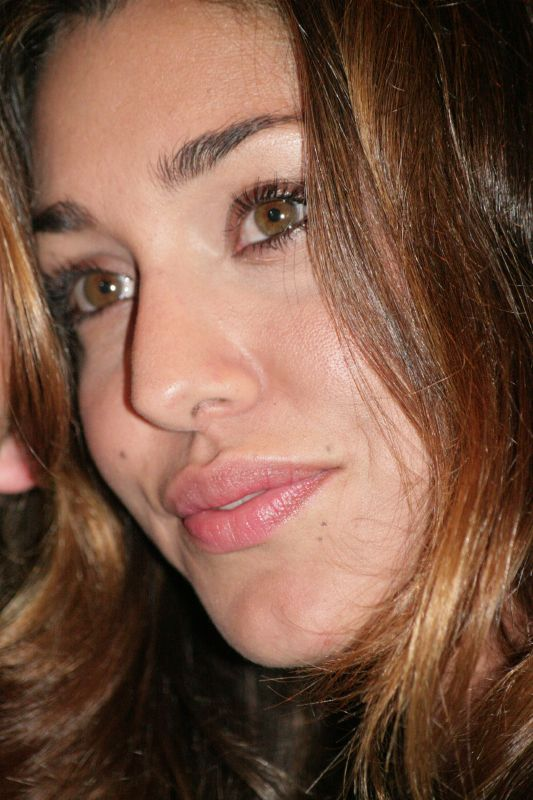
Belén Rodríguez

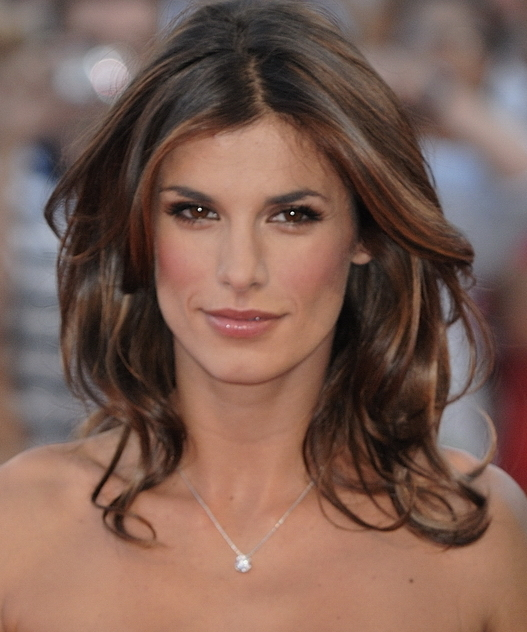
Elisabetta Canalis

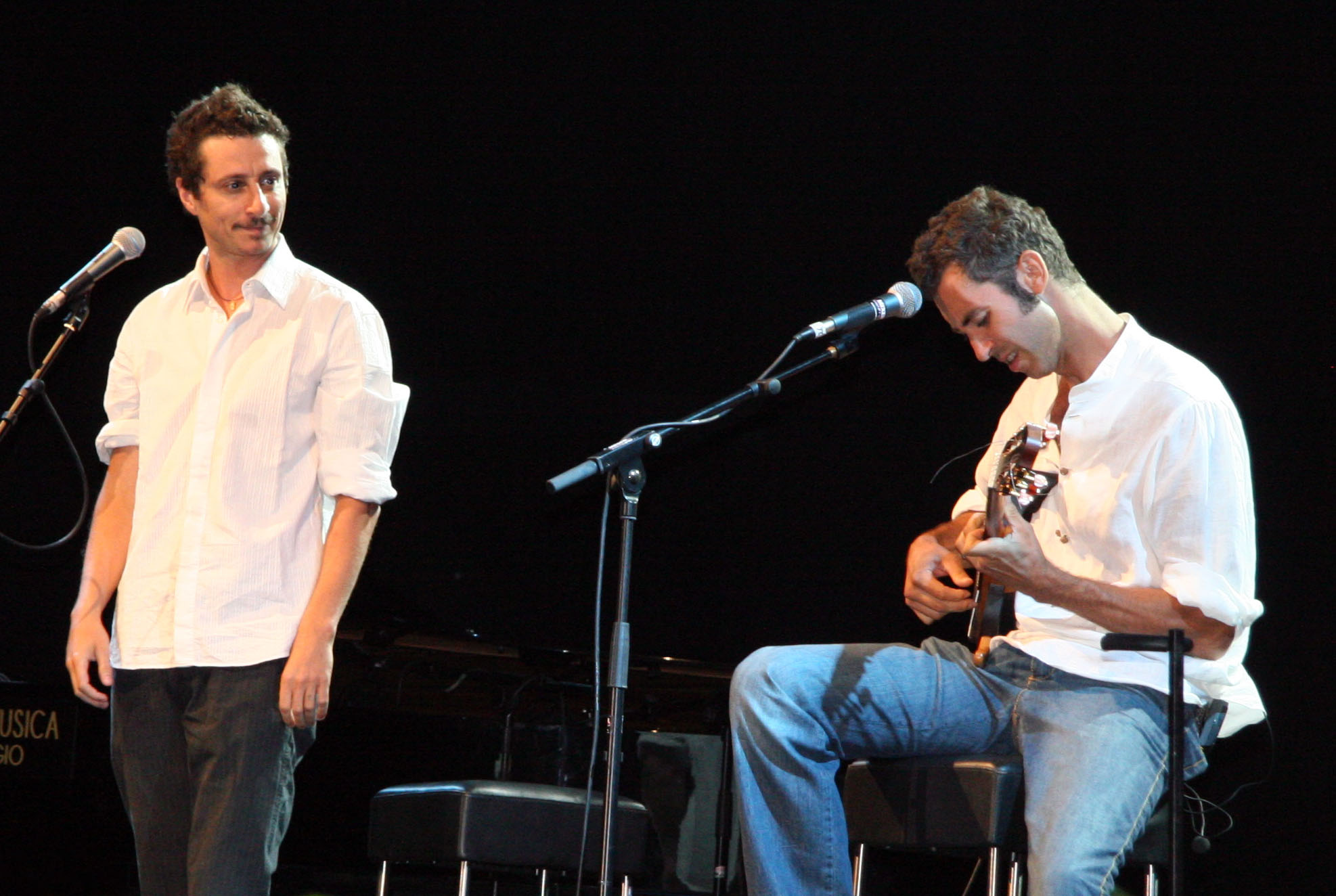
Luca Bizzarri and Paolo Kessisoglu

After some rumours emerged in September 2010, it was officially announced that Gianmarco Mazzi was confirmed as the artistic director of the Sanremo Music Festival. It was Mazzi's sixth Sanremo Music Festival as the artistic director. Italian singer Gianni Morandi was chosen as the main presenter of the show. Negotiations for his contract started in June 2010, and on 6 October 2010, RAI's board of directors confirmed his role in the show and announced Elisabetta Canalis, Belén Rodríguez, Luca Bizzarri and Paolo Kessisoglu as co-presenters of the festival.

The authors of the show were Simona Ercolani, Martino Clericetti, Ivano Balduini, Francesco Valitutti, Michele Ferrari, Gianni Morandi and Italian film director and writer Federico Moccia.

The Sanremo Festival Orchestra was conducted by Marco Sabiu, but each contestant chose a different conductor for the competing song. For the first time in the history of the Sanremo Music Festival, two choreographers were involved in the show, Daniel Ezralow and Franco Miseria. Duccio Forzano directed the show, and the scenography was by Gaetano Castelli and Maria Chiara Castelli.

== Selections ==
=== Newcomers section ===
==== AreaSanremo ====
The artists competing in the newcomers section were selected through two different contests. The first one, formerly known as SanremoLab, was called Area Sanremo, and it was organized by the Comune di Sanremo. The contest was divided into two different sections, SanremoLab, featuring Italian-language songs, and SanremoDoc, reserved to songs in an Italian dialect. After some courses and lectures, two different juries chose 8 artists in the SanremoLab section and 2 artists in the SanremoDoc section as the winners. The jury for the SanremoLab section was composed of Mario Lavezzi, Roy Paci, Eleonoire Casalegno and Mariano Dapori, while the jury for the SanremoDoc section included Maurizio Coruzzi, Davide Van De Sfroos, Giordano Sangiorgi and Enrico Giovannini. The winners—Ida Massaro, Lorenzo Vizzini, Roberto Amadé, Erika Mineo, Eleonora Crupi, Ernesto De Luca, Martino Iacchetti and Gabriella Ferrone for the SanremoLab section, Trenincorsa and Ilaria Palmieri with Terre del sole for the SanremoDoc section—were announced on 24 November 2010. On 27 November 2010, a jury presided by Gianni Morandi selected two artists, Roberto Amadè and Gabriella Ferrone, among the ten winners, which became the first confirmed participants in the newcomers section of the Sanremo Music Festival 2011.

==== Sanremo Giovani 2011 ====
The second contest held to select the remaining 6 participants in the newcomers section of the Sanremo Music Festival 2011 was held in two separate steps. During the first step, auditioning artists were asked to uploaded a video including the proposed song on the official website of the festival, or to send a DVD containing it by ordinary mail. The SanremoAcademy technical jury, presided by Gianni Morandi and Gianmarco Mazzi, selected nine artists. The artists chosen in this step were:

- Anansi, performing "Il sole dentro"
- Serena Abrami, performing "Lontano da tutto"
- BTwins, performing "Mi rubi l'amore"
- Raphael Gualazzi, performing "Follia d'amore"
- Infranti Muri, performing "Contro i giganti"
- Marco Menichini, performing "Tra tegole e cielo"
- Micaela, performing "Fuoco e cenere"
- Neks, performing "Occhi"
- Le Strisce, performing "Vieni a vivere a Napoli"

During the second step, the selected artists performed a popular Italian song during three different episodes of Domenica in, and a ranking was compiled based on televoting and on the points given by a jury representing Italian radio stations. The top 6 artists were admitted to the newcomers section of the Sanremo Music Festival 2011.

Plot 1 – 9 January 2011

- Anansi – "Hey man"
- Micaela – "Come il sole all'improvviso"
- Le Strisce – "Un diavolo in me"

Plot 2 – 16 January 2011

- BTwins – "Fotoromanza"
- Neks – "Aria"
- Infranti Muri – "Profumo"

Plot 3 – 23 January 2011

- Marco Menichini – "Se è vero che ci sei"
- Serena Abrami – "Se io, se lei"
- Raphael Gualazzi – "Quanto tempo e ancora"

The winners of the contest, Serena Abrami, Anansi, Btwins, Raphael Gualazzi, Marco Menichini and Micaela, were announced on 30 January 2011, during the TV programme Domenica in.

=== Big Artists section ===
The acts competing in the Big Artists section were chosen through an internal selection. The first confirmed artist was Roberto Vecchioni, announced on 5 November 2010. On 24 November 2010, it was confirmed that Franco Battiato and Luca Madonia were included as a duo in the official list of the participants. The complete list of the fourteen participants in the Big Artists section was revealed on 20 December 2010, together with the titles of the chosen songs. Alongside Vecchioni, and Madonia with Battiato, the list included Anna Oxa, Max Pezzali, Tricarico, Al Bano, Nathalie, Modà with Emma Marrone, Davide Van De Sfroos, Patty Pravo, Giusy Ferreri, Anna Tatangelo, La Crus and Luca Barbarossa with Raquel del Rosario.

== Shows ==
=== First night ===
==== Big Artists section ====
During the first night, each act in the "Big Artists Section" performed a previously unreleased song. Each song was ranked by 300 people between the age of 18 and 65 years, selected by Ipsos among music listeners. At the end of the night, the two songs receiving the lowest points, Anna Tatangelo's "Bastardo" and "La mia anima d'uomo" by Anna Oxa, were eliminated from the competition.

Performances of the contestants of the Big Artists section on the first night
R/O	Artist	Song	Songwriter(s)	Place	Points
1	Giusy Ferreri	"Il mare immenso"	Giusy Ferreri; Bungaro; Max Calò	2	2,278
2	Luca Barbarossa & Raquel del Rosario	"Fino in fondo"	Luca Barbarossa	5	2,196
3	Roberto Vecchioni	"Chiamami ancora amore"	Roberto Vecchioni; Claudio Guidetti	1	2,488
4	Anna Tatangelo	"Bastardo"	Anna Tatangelo; Vincenzo D'Agostino; Gigi D'Alessio	14	1,540
5	La Crus	"Io confesso"	Mauro Ermanno Giovanardi; Matteo Curallo	8	1,925
6	Max Pezzali	"Il mio secondo tempo"	Max Pezzali	7	1,942
7	Davide Van De Sfroos	"Yanez"	Davide Bernasconi	10	1,779
8	Anna Oxa	"La mia anima d'uomo"	Lorenzo Imerico; Roberto Pacco; Anna Oxa	13	1,726
9	Tricarico	"Tre colori"	Fausto Mesolella	9	1,789
10	Modà & Emma Marrone	"Arriverà"	Francesco Silvestre; Enrico Zapparoli; Enrico Palmosi	4	2,222
11	Luca Madonia & Franco Battiato	"L'alieno"	Luca Madonia	6	2,188
12	Patty Pravo	"Il vento e le rose"	Diego Calvetti; Marco Ciappelli	12	1,741
13	Nathalie	"Vivo sospesa"	Nathalie Giannitrapani	3	2,253
14	Al Bano	"Amanda è libera"	Fabrizio Berlincioni; Albano Carrisi; Alterisio Paoletti	11	1,775

==== Guests and other performances ====
- Antonella Clerici, who presented the Sanremo Music Festival 2010, opened the show. The Italian presenter told her experience in a dialogue with her three-year-old daughter, Maëlle, who was on the stage with her.
- Luca Bizzarri and Paolo Kessisoglu sang a satirical version of the song "In amore", originally performed by Gianni Morandi and Barbara Cola during the Sanremo Music Festival 1995. The comic duo's version of the song, "Ti sputtanerò", featured lyrics referring to the clashes between Silvio Berlusconi and Gianfranco Fini.
- Argentine tango dancer Miguel Ángel Zotto performed La cumparsita with co-presenter Belén Rodríguez, and danced with Daiana Guspero to the song Canaro en Paris.

=== Second night ===
==== Big Artists section ====
On 16 February 2011, each song was performed for a second time by the singers still in competition in the Big Artists Section. As in the first night, the songs were rated by 300 people chosen by Ipsos, and the songs receiving the lowest points, "Amanda è libera" by Al Bano and "Il vento e le rose" by Patty Pravo, were eliminated.

Performances of the contestants of the Big Artists section on the second night
R/O	Artist	Song	Place	Points
1	Nathalie	Vivo sospesa	4	2,187
2	Al Bano	"Amanda è libera"	11	1,654
3	Modà & Emma Marrone	"Arriverà"	2	2,336
4	Patty Pravo	"Il vento e le rose"	12	1,535
5	Tricarico	"Tre colori"	10	1,736
6	Luca Madonia & Franco Battiato	"L'alieno"	5	2,177
7	Max Pezzali	"Il mio secondo tempo"	6	2,012
8	La Crus	"Io confesso"	7	2,004
9	Luca Barbarossa & Raquel del Rosario	"Fino in fondo"	3	2,213
10	Davide Van De Sfross	"Yanez"	9	1,796
11	Roberto Vecchioni	"Chiamami ancora amore"	1	2,713
12	Giusy Ferreri	"Il mare immenso"	8	1,917

==== Newcomers section ====
At the end of the night, four artists in the newcomers section performed their entries for the first time. A ranking was obtained combining televoting with the points given by the Sanremo Festival Orchestra technical jury, and the artists in the bottom two slots, Anansi with "Il sole dentro" and Gabriella Ferrone singing "Un pezzo d'estate", were eliminated.

Performances of the newcomers on the second night
R/O	Artist	Song	Songwriter(s)	Place	Points (Orchestra)	Televotes
1	Serena Abrami	"Lontano da tutto"	Niccolò Fabi	1	26	6,339
2	Anansi	"Il sole dentro"	Stefano Bannò; Pietro Fiabane	3	13	4,786
3	Gabriella Ferrone	"Un pezzo d'estate"	Giuliano Boursier	4	15	2,864
4	Raphael Gualazzi	"Follia d'amore"	Raphael Gualazzi	2	38	4,773

==== Guests and other performances ====
- During the show, Cuban American actor Andy García was interviewed by Gianni Morandi. He also played piano while Morandi sang "Cuba Libre" and co-presenters Belén Rodríguez and Elisabetta Canalis danced to the song.
- Luca Bizzarri and Paolo Kessisoglu performed a satirical piece, talking about Roberto Saviano, Michele Santoro and Luca Cordero di Montezemolo, among the others.
- British singer–songwriter Eliza Doolittle sang her hit single "Skinny Genes". After her performance, she was briefly interviewed by Gianni Morandi and Elisabetta Canalis.

=== Third night ===
==== Celebration of the anniversary of the Italian unification ====
On 17 February 2011, all the acts competing in the Big Artists section, including the eliminated ones, performed a cover of a popular Italian song, in order to celebrate the 150th anniversary of the Italian unification. During the night, the public's vote determined the winner of the prize "Nata per unire" (English: Born to unify), which was completely unrelated to the outcome of the contest. The song receiving the most votes was "Va, pensiero", performed by Al Bano.

Performances of the contestants of the Big Artists section on the third night
R/O	Artist	Song
1	Davide Van De Sfroos	"Viva l'Italia"
2	Anna Tatangelo	"Mamma"
3	Anna Oxa	"'O sole mio"
4	Al Bano with Iannis Plutarchos & Theodossiou Dimitra	"Va, pensiero"
5	Patty Pravo	"Mille lire al mese"
6	Luca Madonia & Franco Battiato	"La notte dell'addio"
7	Giusy Ferreri	"Il cielo in una stanza"
8	Nathalie	"Il mio canto libero"
9	Luca Barbarossa & Raquel Del Rosario	"Addio mia bella addio"
10	Modà & Emma Marrone	"Here's to You"
11	Max Pezzali with Arisa	"Mamma mia dammi cento lire"
12	Roberto Vecchioni	"'O Surdato 'Nnamurato"
13	La Crus with Gnu Quartet	"Parlami d'amore Mariù"
14	Tricarico with Toto Cutugno	"L'italiano"

==== Newcomers section ====
After all the Big Artists' performances, the four newcomers which didn't sing on the second night performed their entries for the first time. As in the previous night, the two artists receiving the lowest rating obtained combining the points given by the Sanremo Festival Orchestra technical jury and by the public's vote were eliminated.

Performances of the newcomers on the third night
R/O	Artist	Song	Songwriter(s)	Place	Points (Orchestra)	Televoting
1	Micaela	"Fuoco e cenere"	Luciano Nigro; Alfio Santonocito; Francesco Muggeo	1	24	7,640
2	Roberto Amadè	"Come pioggia"	Roberto Amadè	2	26	1,771
3	BTwins	"Mi rubi l'amore"	Saverio Grandi; Cesare Chiodo	3	7	9,884
4	Marco Menichini	"Tra tegole e cielo"	Stefano Senesi; Andrea Perrozzi; Maurizio Galli	4	23	4,442

==== Repechage round ====
In the end of the night, the four artists eliminated during the previous nights performed again their entries. The two acts receiving the most votes, Anna Tatangelo and Al Bano, were reinstated in the competition.

Performances of the eliminated "Big Artists"
R/O	Artist	Song	Place	Televotes
1	Patty Pravo	"Il vento e le rose"	4	13.92%
2	Anna Tatangelo	"Bastardo"	2	34.43%
3	Al Bano	"Amanda è libera"	1	34.94%
4	Anna Oxa	"La mia anima d'uomo"	3	15.71%

==== Guests and other performances ====
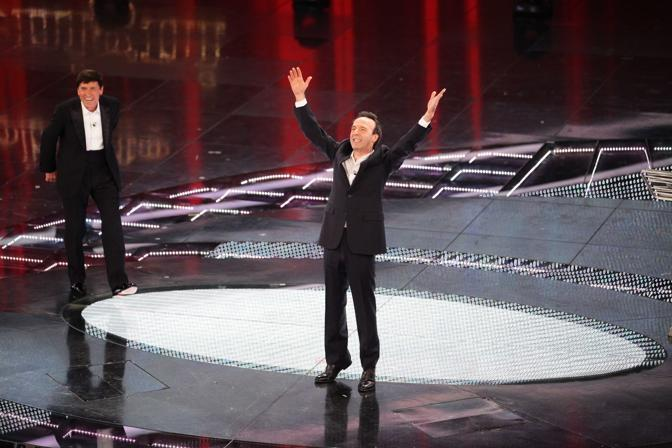
Roberto Benigni (center) performing at Sanremo 2011; host Gianni Morandi is on the left

- Roberto Benigni, after entering the stage on the back of a horse, performed an exegesis of the Italian national anthem, "Il Canto degli Italiani". His long monologue included several references to current political events in Italy.
- Gianni Morandi performed the previously unreleased song "Rinascimento". Its lyrics, referring to the Italian unification, were written by Mogol, while the music was written by Italian singer-songwriter Gianni Bella some years before.
- Luca Bizzarri and Paolo Kessisoglu performed Giorgio Gaber's "Noi due stupidi", as a tribute to the popular Italian singer-songwriter.

=== Fourth night ===
==== Big Artists section ====
During the fourth night, the twelve remaining artists in the Big Artists section performed their entries in a new version, together with guest artists. Each song was ranked by the Sanremo Festival Orchestra technical jury and the results were combined with televoting. The two songs in the bottom two slots were eliminated.

Performances of the contestants of the Big Artists section on the fourth night
R/O	Artist	Song	Guest artist	Place	Points (Orchestra)	Televotes
1	Luca Barbarossa & Raquel del Rosario	"Fino in fondo"	Neri Marcorè	9	1	16,462
2	La Crus	"Io confesso"	Nina Zilli	4	19	7,580
3	Anna Tatangelo	"Bastardo"	Loredana Errore	7	6	16,330
4	Max Pezzali	"Il mio secondo tempo"	Lillo & Greg	11	3	11,612
5	Tricarico	"Tre colori"	Coro Silaso...l	12	8	5,819
6	Giusy Ferreri	"Il mare immenso"	Francesco Sarcina	8	13	3,535
7	Luca Madonia & Franco Battiato	"L'alieno"	Carmen Consoli	10	10	4,131
8	Nathalie	"Vivo sospesa"	L'Aura	6	8	8,845
9	Roberto Vecchioni	"Chiamami ancora amore"	Premiata Forneria Marconi	1	26	32,287
10	Davide Van De Sfroos	"Yanez"	Irene Fornaciari	5	2	28,419
11	Al Bano	"Amanda è libera"	Michele Placido	3	19	17,321
12	Modà & Emma Marrone	"Arriverà"	Francesco Renga	2	17	30,309

==== Newcomers section ====
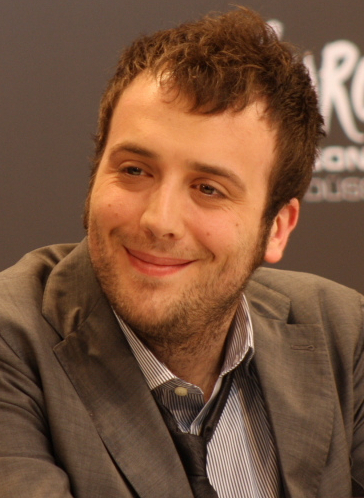
Raphael Gualazzi, winner of the Sanremo Music Festival 2011 in the Newcomers Section.

In the end of the night, the four newcomers still in competition performed their entries for a second time, and the winner was determined by combining the public's vote with the ratings given by the Sanremo Festival Orchestra technical jury.

Performances of the newcomers on the fourth night
R/O	Artist	Song	Place	Points (Orchestra)	Televotes
1	Micaela	"Fuoco e cenere"	2	26	10,243
2	Raphael Gualazzi	"Follia d'amore"	1	32	9,151
3	Roberto Amadé	"Come pioggia"	3	21	3,164
4	Serena Abrami	"Lontano da tutto"	4	9	5,559

==== Guests and other performances ====
- Monica Bellucci and Robert De Niro were interviewed by Gianni Morandi, promoting the film The Ages of Love, directed by Giovanni Veronesi. De Niro was later interviewed a second time by Elisabetta Canalis.
- British pop group Take That performed the single "The Flood". After their performance, Robbie Williams and Gary Barlow were briefly interviewed by Elisabetta Canalis and Belén Rodríguez.
- Luca Bizzarri and Paolo Kessisoglu performed a satiric version of Morandi's "Uno su mille", featuring lyrics about leadership problems in the Italian Democratic Party.

=== Fifth night ===
==== First round ====
During the final of the show, the ten remaining artists in the Big Artists section performed their entries, and were voted by the Sanremo Festival Orchestra technical jury and by the public, through televoting. Music journalist were asked to vote for one of the artists, who received the "Golden Share" and was allowed to gain four slots on the previous chart. The Golden Share was received by Roberto Vecchioni, who already was in the top three artists of the night.

Performances of the "Big Artists" on the first round of the final
R/O	Artist	Song	Place	Points (Golden share)	Points (Orchestra)	Televotes
1	Davide Van De Sfroos	"Yanez"	4	13	7	51,300
2	Roberto Vecchioni	"Chiamami ancora amore"	1	44	25	111,770
3	Anna Tatangelo	"Bastardo"	9	0	5	31,495
4	Luca Barbarossa & Raquel del Rosario	"Fino in fondo"	8	2	1	42,155
5	Al Bano	"Amanda è libera"	3	2	23	32,232
6	La Crus	"Io confesso"	6	21	17	15,273
7	Giusy Ferreri	"Il mare immenso"	10	0	10	9,294
8	Nathalie	"Vivo sospesa"	7	1	8	21,119
9	Modà & Emma Marrone	"Arriverà"	2	16	12	107,318
10	Luca Madonia & Franco Battiato	"L'alieno"	5	8	12	16,026

==== Second round ====
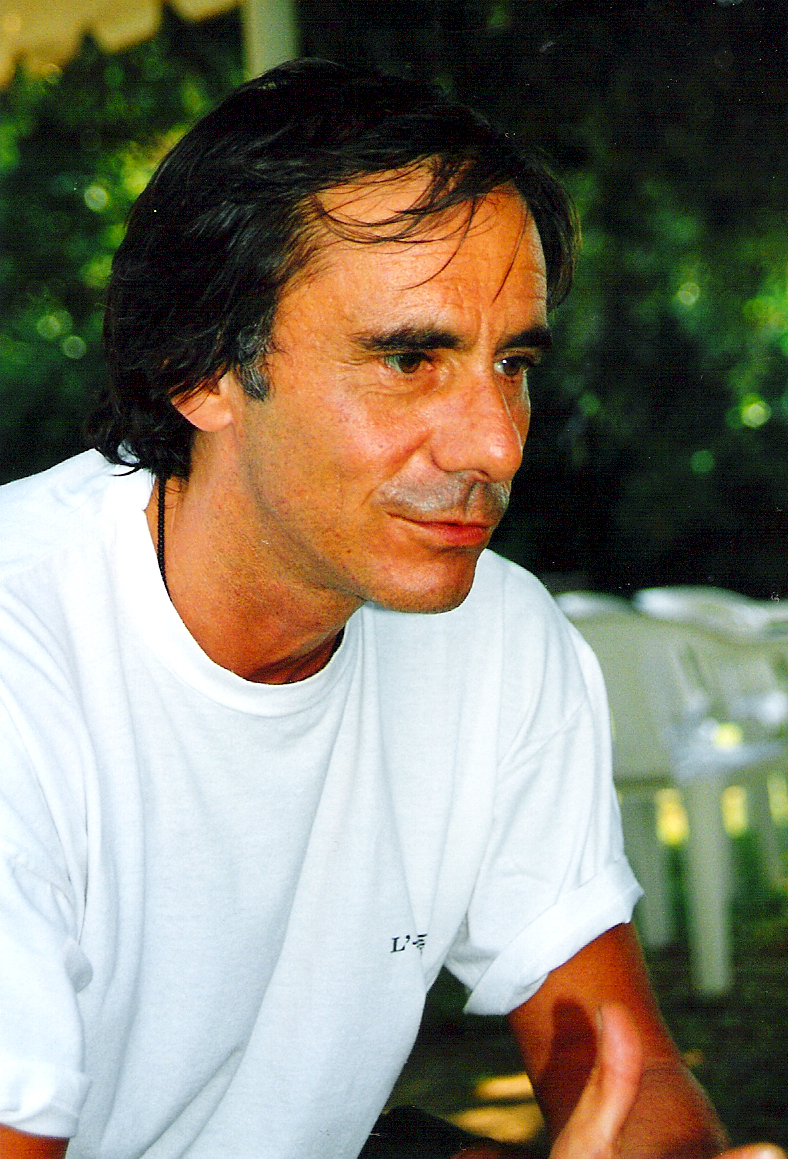
Roberto Vecchioni, winner of the Sanremo Music Festival 2011

In the end of the night, the top three artists performed their entries for the last time, and the winner was determined by televoting only.

Performances of the "Big Artists" on the second round of the final
R/O	Artist	Song	Place	Televotes
1	Roberto Vecchioni	"Chiamami ancora amore"	1	48.34%
2	Modà & Emma Marrone	"Arriverà"	2	39.88%
3	Al Bano	"Amanda è libera"	3	11.77%

==== Guests and other performances ====
- Belén Rodríguez performed the song "Tú", accompanied by her father Gustavo Rodriguez playing guitar.
- Elisabetta Canalis danced to Ciara's song "Like a Boy", with Italian dancer Valerio Pino.
- Luca Bizzarri and Paolo Kessisoglu performed the traditional Italian songs "Reginella" and "Ma se ghe penso", dueting with Massimo Ranieri.
- Canadian singer Avril Lavigne sang her single "What the Hell" and answered a few questions by presenter Gianni Morandi.
- Massimo Ranieri was interviewed by Gianni Morandi. During the interview, they performed together Ranieri's "L'amore è una cosa meravigliosa", Morandi's "La fisarmonica" and Domenico Modugno's "Nel blu dipinto di blu".
- Italian television presenter Milly Carlucci appeared on stage to promote the seventh series of Ballando con le stelle, while Italian actors Giulio Scarpati and Nino Frassica promoted the TV series Cugino & cugino.
- Orchestra conductor Marco Sabiu performed his composition "Sabiu n. 7".
- A few minutes before the announcement of the top three artists, Luca Bizzarri and Paolo Kessisoglu performed Cochi & Renato's "Finché c'è la salute".

== Other awards ==
=== Critics Award "Mia Martini" ===
==== Big Artists section ====
Points received by the Big Artists for the Critics Award
Artist	Song	Points	Result
Roberto Vecchioni	"Chiamami ancora amore"	52	Winner
La Crus	"Io confesso"	22	Second place
Al Bano	"Amanda è libera"	5	Third place
Luca Madonia & Franco Battiato	"L'alieno"	5	Third place
Modà & Emma Marrone	"Arriverà"	5	Third place
Davide Van De Sfroos	"Yanez"	5	Third place
Anna Tatangelo	"Bastardo"	4	Seventh place
Luca Barbarossa & Raquel del Rosario	"Fino in fondo"	3	Eight place
Nathalie	"Vivo sospesa"	3	Eight place
Anna Oxa	"La mia anima d'uomo"	3	Eight place
Tricarico	"Tre colori"	3	Eight place
Giusy Ferreri	"Il mare immenso"	1	Twelfth place
Max Pezzali	"Il mio secondo tempo	1	Twelfth place
Patty Pravo	"Il vento e le rose"	0	Fourteenth place

==== Newcomers section ====
Points received by the newcomers for the Critics Award
Artist	Song	Points	Result
Raphael Gualazzi	"Follia d'amore"	67	Winner
Serena Abrami	"Lontano da tutto"	11	Second place
Marco Menichini	"Tra tegole e cielo"	7	Third place
Roberto Amadé	"Come pioggia"	7	Third place
Anansi	"Il sole dentro"	6	Fifth place
Micaela	"Fuoco e cenere"	6	Fifth place
BTwins	"Mi rubi l'amore"	3	Seventh place
Gabriella Ferrone	"Un pezzo d'estate"	1	Eighth place

=== Press, Radio & TV Award ===
==== Big Artists section ====
- Winner: Roberto Vecchioni with "Chiamami ancora amore".

==== Newcomers section ====
Points received by the newcomers for the Critics Award
Artist	Song	Points	Result
Raphael Gualazzi	"Follia d'amore"	40	Winner
Serena Abrami	"Lontano da tutto"	11	Second place
Micaela	"Fuoco e cenere"	5	Third place
Anansi	"Il sole dentro"	3	Third place
Roberto Amadè	"Come pioggia"	2	Fourth place
Marco Menichini	"Tra tegole e cielo"	2	Fourth place
Gabriella Ferrone	"Un pezzo d'estate"	1	Eighth place

== Ratings ==
Episode	Date	Viewers	Share
Night 1	15 February 2011	11,992,000	46.39%
Night 2	16 February 2011	10,145,000	42.67%
Night 3	17 February 2011	12,363,000	50.90%
Night 4	18 February 2011	10,616,000	46.90%
Night 5	19 February 2011	12,136,000	52.12%

== Broadcasts ==
=== International broadcasts ===
Known details on the broadcasts in each country, including the specific broadcasting stations and commentators are shown in the tables below.

International broadcasters of the Sanremo Music Festival 2011
Country	Broadcaster	Channel(s)	Commentator(s)	Ref(s)
Australia	SBS	SBS ONE (Note: Delayed broadcast every Saturday since 8 May through 4 June at 13:00 (AEST))		

== See also ==
- Italy in the Eurovision Song Contest 2011
