= Andrea Bempensante =

Italian screenwriter

Andrea Bempensante (born 30 December 1969, in Milan) is an Italian screenwriter and senior writer at Le Iene Show, a satirical show on Italian television.

He wrote the movies Assolo (1995), Doom (1996) and Cra-Cra (1997) which won awards at Venice Film Festival, Clermont Ferrand, Tehran, Valencia, Montreal.

In 1999 he wrote the movie 20-Venti (aka 20-Twenty), an on the road movie about a TV journalist and a pornstar (played by Cecilia Dazzi e Anita Caprioli). The plot is divided into twenty episodes, one for each and every cigarette smoked from the same 20 pack. The film was critically acclaimed, premiered at Berlin International Film Festival and won awards at Brooklyn Film Festival, Annecy and others international festivals. In 2000, the movie won best feature film of the year by Duel magazine.

In 2001, he wrote the movie A Farewell to Beat, in which famous Italian translator and critic Fernanda Pivano meets the greatest living American writers like Bret Easton Ellis, Jay McInerney, Barry Gifford and Lawrence Ferlinghetti to narrate the adventure of the Beat Generation.

In 2001, he joined Le Iene, one of the most innovative and successful satirical show of Italian television and wrote many comedy bits about social issues.

In 2009, with Francesco Mandelli, Fabrizio Biggio and Martino Ferro, he created I soliti idioti, an Italian sitcom. The show aired on MTV for four seasons and the main characters were adapted for the big screen in 2011 and 2012. Both the movies were top-grossing film in the Italian box office.

In 2012, with Fabio Volo and Cristian Biondani, he created Voloindiretta, a late show for RaiTre.

In 2013, he wrote DROGA, le Iene Show's manual to drug: history, effects use and abuse.

== Filmography ==
=== Fiction ===
- Assolo (1995)
- Doom (1996)
- Cra Cra (1997)
- A.A.Agenzia Abbandoni (1999)
- 20 – Venti (2000)
- Fernanda Pivano: A Farewell to Beat (2001)
- Bradipo (2001)
- Italoamericano (2008)
- I Soliti Idioti (2009)

=== Television ===
- Sushi e Sashimi (2000)
- Mad (2001)
- Smetto quando Voglio (2001)
- Le Iene (2001–2013)
- The Desk (2010)
- I Soliti Idioti (2009)
- Volo in diretta (2012)
