= Ambra Angiolini =

Italian actress and singer (born 1977)

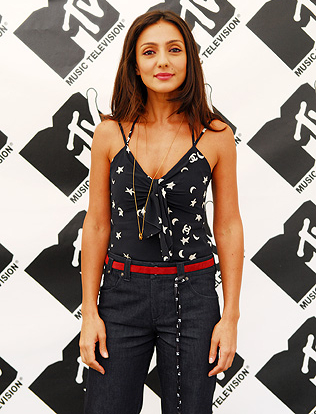
- Born: 22 April 1977 (age 49); Rome, Italy
- Occupations: Actress; singer
- Years active: 1992–present

Ambra Angiolini (born 22 April 1977) is an Italian actress and singer.

She made her film debut in Ferzan Özpetek's Saturn in Opposition (2007) for which she won the David di Donatello for Best Supporting Actress as well as the Nastro d'Argento for Best Supporting Actress, the Ciak d'oro and the Globo d'oro. She continued working as an actress in films like Black and White (2008), The Immature (2011), Viva l'Italia (2013), Do You Remember Me? (2014) and The Choice (2015).

On 9 October 1997, she was in Dario Fo's car recording an interview with him when a car appeared alongside them, displaying an enormous placard in the window reading "Dario, you've won the Nobel prize!", meaning Fo's initial reaction was captured on film.

== Television beginnings and music career ==
In 1992, at the age of 15, she took part in the second edition of Non è la RAI. She left the show in 1995 to host Generazione X in Italia 1. She also hosted the shows Super, Non dimenticate lo spazzolino da denti and Cominciamo bene estate during the subsequent years, as well as Stasera niente MTC in MTV Italy.

Her first album T'appartengo was released in 1994 and it was an instant success. The following year, she recorded a Spanish version, Te pertenezco, which was a moderate hit, reaching No. 21 on the Hot Latin Songs chart of Billboard. In February 1997, she was invited to take part in the Viña del Mar International Song Festival in Chile, where she aspicy and controversial performance with it is iconic today in the festival's history.

Her follow-up album, Angiolini (Angelitos in the Spanish-speaking markets), was released in 1996. Her third album Ritmo vitale was released in 1997 in Italy, and a Spanish version entitled Ritmos vitales followed in 1998. Her last album InCanto was released in 1999 only in Italy.

== Acting career ==
Angiolini won the Nastro d'Argento, the David di Donatello for Best Supporting Actress and the Ciak d'oro alla rivelazione dell'anno for her role in Saturno contro (2007) directed by Ferzan Özpetek.

== Personal life ==
Angiolini was born in Rome to Doriana and Alfredo. She lived in Brescia with the singer-songwriter Francesco Renga and they had two children, Jolanda (born in 2004) and Leonardo (born in 2006). The couple separated in 2015, and between 2017 and 2021 she was in a relationship with the football manager Massimiliano Allegri.

== Discography ==
=== Studio albums ===
List of studio albums, with chart positions and certifications
Title	Album details	Peak chart positions	Certifications
Title	Album details	ITA	Certifications
T'appartengo	Released: 11 November 1994; Label: RTI; Format: CD, vinyl, digital download,	6	FIMI: 3× Platinum; PROMUSICAE: Platinum
Angiolini	Released: 1 January 1996; Label: RTI; Format: CD, digital download	7	FIMI: Platinum
Ritmo vitale	Released: 7 September 1997; Label: RTI; Format: CD, digital download	19	FIMI: Platinum
InCanto	Released: 12 November 1999; Label: Sony; Format: CD, digital download	—	FIMI: Gold

=== Singles ===
==== As lead artist ====
List of singles as lead artist, with chart positions, album name and certifications
Single	Year	Peak chart positions	Certifications	Album	Notes
Single	Year	ITA	Certifications	Album	Notes
"T'appartengo"	1994	52	FIMI: 5× Platinum	T'appartengo	
"L'ascensore"	1995	—		T'appartengo	
"Ti stravoglio"	1996	—		Angiolini	
"Aspettavo te"	1996	—		Angiolini	
"Ritmo vitale"	1997	83		Ritmo vitale	
"Io, te, Francesca e Davide"	1997	—	FIMI: Gold	Ritmo vitale	
"Guardati le spalle"	1997	—		Ritmo vitale	
"Brivido (Remix)"	1997	—		Ritmo vitale	
"Canto alla luna"	1999	—		InCanto	

==== As featured artist ====
List of singles as featured artist, with chart positions, album name and certifications
Single	Year	Peak chart positions	Certifications	Album	Notes
Single	Year	ITA	Certifications	Album	Notes
"Girotondo rap" (Franco Nero featuring Ambra Angiolini and other artists)	1999	—		Non-album single	
"Frena" (Carlotta featuring Ambra Angiolini)	2001	10	FIMI: Gold	Smack!	
"Io, te, Francesca e Davide (Remix)" (Syria featuring Ambra Angiolini)	2017	—		10+10	

=== Guest appearances ===
Title	Year	Other artist(s)	Album
"Nel cuore, nell'anima"	1995	Non è la RAI cast	Non è la RAI: Gran Finale
"Ma che musica maestro"	1999	Platinette	Da Viva - Vol. 1
"Voglia, questa voglia"	2008	None	Stasera niente MTV
"Tunga tunga"	2008	None	Stasera niente MTV
"Lentamente muore"	2010	None	Parole note
"Ti vorrei"	2020	Marco Masini	Masini +1
"Ambra/Tiziano"	2022	Tiziano Ferro	Il mondo è nostro

== Filmography ==
=== Films ===
Year	Title	Role(s)	Notes
2007	Saturn in Opposition	Roberta	
2007	The Fox and the Child	Narrator (voice)	Italian dub; voice role
2008	Black and White	Elena	
2009	Ce n'è per tutti	Eva	
2010	News from the Excavations	La Marchesa	
2010	Insula	Francesca Leone	Short film
2011	All at Sea	Giovanna	
2011	The Immature	Francesca Di Modugno	
2011	It May Be Love But It Doesn't Show	Gisella	
2012	Viva l'Italia	Susanna Spagnolo	
2012	The Immature: The Trip	Francesca Di Modugno	
2012	Ci vediamo a casa	Vilma	
2013	Us in the U.S.	Angela	
2013	Stai lontana da me	Sara	
2014	Maldamore	Veronica	
2014	Do You Remember Me?	Beatrice Benassi	
2014	Ladiesroom	Greta	Short film
2014	Un Natale stupefacente	Genny	
2015	Come un morto ad Acapulco	Sara	Short film
2015	Era bellissima	Serena	Short film
2015	The Choice	Laura	
2016	Al posto tuo	Claudia	
2016	7 Minutes	Greta	
2017	Il colloquio	Annalisa Moretti	Short film
2017	La verità, vi spiego, sull'amore	Dora Biagi	
2017	Couple Therapy for Cheaters	Viviana	
2018	Incredibles 2	Evelyn Deavor / Screenslaver (voice)	Italian dub; voice role
2018	Vengo anch'io	Pharmacist	Cameo appearance
2019	Brave ragazze	Anna Mancini	
2019	Klaus	Alva (voice)	Italian dub; voice role
2020	Arctic Dogs	Jade (voice)	Italian dub; voice role
2021	Per tutta la vita	Sara	
2022	La notte più lunga dell'anno	Luce	
2022	Turning Red	Helen (voice)	Italian dub; voice role

=== Television ===
Year	Title	Role(s)	Notes
1990–1991	Fantastico	Herself / Audience member	Variety show (season 11)
1992	Bulli e pupe	Herself / Contestant	Variety show
1992–1995	Non è la RAI	Herself / Cast member	Variety/musical show
1993	Rock 'n' roll	Herself / co-host	Musical program
1995–1996	Generazione X	Herself / Host	Talk show
1996	DopoFestival 1996	Herself / co-host	Sanremo Music Festival aftershow
1996	Favola	Teresa	Television movie
1996–1997	Non dimenticate lo spazzolino da denti	Herself / co-host	Game show (season 2)
2000	Mary Magdalene	Salome	Television movie
2001	Una donna per amico	Tea	Main role (season 3)
2001–2002	L'assemblea	Herself / Host	Talk show
2002	Gian Burrasca	Luisa	Television movie
2005	Sanremo Music Festival 2005	Herself / Opinionist	Annual music festival
2005–2006	Chicas	Herself / Host	Talk show
2007–2008	Crozza Italia	Herself / Recurring guest	Satirical program
2008	The Simpsons	Lurleen Lumpkin (voice)	Italian dub, Episode: "Papa Don't Leech"
2008	Stasera niente MTV	Herself / Host	Variety show
2009	Nastro d'Argento 2009	Herself / Host	Annual ceremony
2010	All Stars	Anita	Main role; 20 episodes
2010	La nuova squadra	Ludovica Belforte	2 episodes
2011	Eroi per caso	Teresa	Miniseries
2011–2012	Piazza pulita	Herself / co-host	Talk show (season 1)
2014	Zelig	Herself / Guest host	Episode: "7th November"
2017	Amici di Maria De Filippi	Herself / Judge	Talent show (season 16, final stage)
2017	Sanremo Giovani 2017	Herself / Judge	Talent show
2018	Il fulgore di Dory	Dory's mother	Television movie
2019–2020	Il silenzio dell'acqua	Luisa Ferrari	Lead role; 8 episodes
2021	Drag Race Italia	Herself / Guest judge	Episode: "Gran finale"
2022	The Ignorant Angels	Annamaria	Main role; 6 episodes
2022–2023	X Factor	Herself / Judge	Talent show (seasons 16–17)
2023	Gigolò per caso	Margherita	Main role; 6 episodes
2024	Sempre al tuo fianco	Sara Nobili	Lead role
