= The Immature =

- Italian: Immaturi
- Directed by: Paolo Genovese
- Written by: Paolo Genovese
- Produced by: Marco Belardi
- Starring: Raoul Bova; Barbora Bobuľová; Ambra Angiolini; Luca Bizzarri; Paolo Kessisoglu; Ricky Memphis; Anita Caprioli; Luisa Ranieri
- Cinematography: Fabrizio Lucci
- Edited by: Patrizio Marone
- Music by: Andrea Guerra
- Release date: 2011
- Running time: 108 min
- Country: Italy
- Language: Italian

The Immature (Italian: Immaturi) is a 2011 Italian comedy film directed by Paolo Genovese. The film was a commercial success, grossing over 19 million dollars at the Italian box office. It was nominated for three David di Donatello and for four Nastri d'Argento Awards.

A sequel, The Immature: The Trip, was released in 2012.

== Plot summary ==
A group of forty-somethings meet again after many years; they had been classmates in high school (liceo classico), and haven't met since. Each of them has a family, or still lives the anxiety of teenagers, trying to get by in life. One day they receive the news that their final exams have been invalidated for bureaucratic complications. They will have to go back to school as students to retake the exams, if they want their degrees and diplomas to be still valid. The protagonists organize study sessions during the summer, during which they have the chance to relive the passions of the past, which now only teenagers can remember and try.

== Cast ==
- Raoul Bova as Giorgio Romanini
- Barbora Bobuľová as Luisa
- Ambra Angiolini as Francesca
- Luca Bizzarri as Piero Galeazzi
- Paolo Kessisoglu as Virgilio
- Ricky Memphis as Lorenzo Coppetti
- Luisa Ranieri as Marta
- Anita Caprioli as Eleonora
- Giulia Michelini as Cinzia
- Isabelle Adriani as Samantha
- Alessandro Tiberi as Ivano
- Giovanna Ralli as Iole
- Maurizio Mattioli as Luigi

== TV Series ==
In 2017 Mediaset announced the TV show Immaturi la serie

== Remakes ==
In 2026, a Spanish remake titled Seis tramposos directed by Fer García-Ruiz and starring Ernesto Sevilla, Marta Etura, Inma Cuesta, Julián López, Iván Massagué, and Ilse Salas was reported to be in development.

== See also ==
- List of Italian films of 2011
