= Nathalie (singer) =

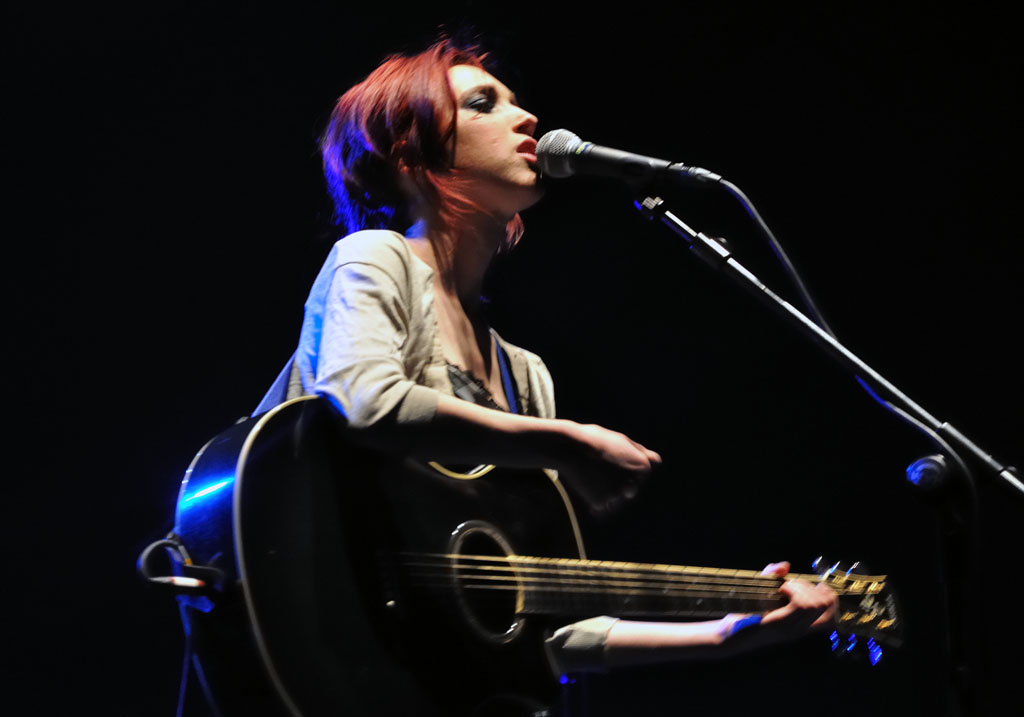
- Nathalie playing in Padua on 15 April 2011

Background information
- Born: Natalia Beatrice Giannitrapani; 16 December 1979 (age 46); Rome, Italy
- Genres: Pop; pop rock
- Occupation: Singer
- Instruments: Vocals; piano; guitar
- Years active: 2003–present
- Labels: Helikonia Edizioni (2006 - 2007); Sony Music (2011 - 2014); Believe Digital (2018 - 2020); Intimate Colours Music/Tunecore (2022-)
- Website: nathalieofficial.it

Natalia Beatrice Giannitrapani (born 16 December 1979), simply known as Nathalie, is an Italian singer. She rose to fame after winning the fourth season of the Italian version of The X Factor in 2010. Her winning single, "In punta di piedi", was released immediately after the final of the show, and debuted atop the FIMI Top Digital Downloads chart.

In 2011, Nathalie competed in the Big Artists section of the 61st Sanremo Music Festival, placing 7th in a field of 14 with the song "Vivo sospesa", which was released as the lead single from her debut album with the same title. Her second studio set, Anima di vento, was released on 17 September 2013.

== Biography ==
=== Early life ===
Nathalie Beatrice Giannitrapani was born in Rome to a Sicilian father of Italian origin from Tunisia and a Belgian mother. She began studying music at the age of 13 and writing her first songs at the age of 15, with lyrics in Italian, English and French (also speaking Spanish). Giannitrapani songs are composed in accompaniment of a guitar and piano.

In 1998, Giannitrapani was ranked third in the Spazio Aperto music competition. After winning the 2000 under-21 category in the Festival Fuoritempo, Giannitrapani returned in 2002 and received the best song award. In the same year Giannitrapani formed her first band, made up of artists; Marco Parente, La Crus and Max Gazzè. From 2003 to 2004, Giannitrapani joined the band "Damage Done", a nu metal band, with the single "Thorns" and an album of the same name. In October 2005 Giannitrapani participated in Biella Festival, placing second, in the following year she won the Premio SIAE per Demo. In 2006, the winner of the sixth edition of MArteLive. Giannitrapani has also worked in the staging of the musicals Les Misérables and The Neverending Story.

=== 2010: X Factor and In punta di piedi ===
In 2010, Giannitrapani auditioned for the fourth series of the Italian X Factor, she passed to the live shows, and placed in the 25+ category, mentored by Elio. Reaching the final on 23 November 2010, Giannitrapani was proclaimed the winner of the show after a final public vote, securing a contract with record company Sony Music worth €300,000, thus becoming the first female winner in the series. Giannitrapani's debut single "In punta di piedi" was released as a digital download, on 24 November, and on CD on 30 November.

At a press conference presenting the fourth series of X Factor, Rai 2 director Massimo Liofredi announced that the winner of the competition "might" advance to represent Italy in the Eurovision Song Contest 2011, rather than participate in the Sanremo Music Festival, like in previous years. On 2 December 2010, it was confirmed that Italy would return to the Eurovision Song Contest having last participated in 1997, but it was later announced that the Italian representative would be chosen through an internal selection among contestants of the Sanremo Music Festival 2011.

=== 2011–2012: Sanremo Music Festival and Vivo sospesa ===
In 2011, Giannitrapani competed in the "Big Artists" section of the 61st Sanremo Festival with her entry "Vivo sospesa". The song finished 7th in a field of 14 and was released as the lead single from Nathalie's debut studio album, titled Vivo sospesa and issued by Sony Music in February 2011.

In 2011, Nathalie also dubbed Gloria in the Italian version of Happy Feet 2. In 2012, Giannitrapani appeared as an actress during an episode of the fifth season of Italian comedy television series I Cesaroni.

=== 2013: Anima di vento ===
In August 2013, Nathalie released the single "Sogno d'estate", featuring Italian singer Raf. The single preceded her second studio album, Anima di vento, released on 17 September 2013 and also featuring duets with Franco Battiato and Toni Childs.

=== Into the Flow and Freemotion ===
The following studio album are Into the Flow (2018) and Freemotion (2024).

== Discography ==
=== Albums ===
List of albums, with selected chart positions, sales, and certifications
Title	Album details	Peak chart positions		Certifications
Title	Album details	ITA	SWI	Certifications
Vivo sospesa	Released: 16 February 2011; Label: Sony Music; Formats: CD, download	6	84	
Anima di vento	Released: 17 September 2013; Label: Sony Music; Formats: CD, download	20	—	
Into the Flow	Released: 11 May 2018; Label: Believe Digital; Formats: CD, download	93	—	
Freemotion	Released: 10 January 2024; Label: Tunecore/Intimate Colours Music (crowdfunding); Formats: CD, download	—	—	

=== Extended plays ===
List of albums, with selected chart positions, sales, and certifications
Title	Album details	Peak chart positions		Certifications
Title	Album details	ITA	SWI	Certifications
In punta di piedi	Released: 23 November 2010; Label: Sony BMG; Formats: CD, download	13	—	
Arcobaleno	Released: 14 July 2023; Label: Tunecore/Intimate Colours Music; Formats: Download, streaming	—	—	
"—" denotes extended plays that did not chart

=== Singles ===
List of singles (incomplete), with chart positions, showing year released and album name
Single	Year	Peak chart positions	Certifications	Album or EP
Single	Year	ITA	Certifications	Album or EP
"In punta di piedi"	2010	1	FIMI: Gold	In punta di piedi
"Vivo sospesa"	2011	7		Vivo sospesa
"Sogno freddo"	2011	—		Vivo sospesa
"Mucchi di gente"	2011	—		Vivo sospesa
"Sogno d'estate" (feat. Raf)	2013	—		Anima di vento
"—" denotes singles that did not chart

=== Other appearances ===
List of other album appearances
Contribution	Year	Album
"L'alba"	2009	The Best of Demo, Vol. 5 by Various Artists
"Bette Davis Eyes" (Roberto Procaccini feat. Nathalie)	2009	Trappola d'autore O.S.T.
"I'm Falling" (Massimo Nunzi with Nathalie)	2010	Crimini (La musica originale della seconda serie TV)
"Il mio canto libero"	2011	Nata per unire
"Numeri" (Raf feat. Frankie Hi-NRG MC & Nathalie)	2011	Numeri
"Tu, forse non-essenzialmente tu"	2011	Dalla parte di Rino
"Non sento più niete" (Matteo Branciamore feat. Nathalie)	2012	Oro trasparente

== Awards and nominations ==
Year	Award	Category	Work	Result
2006	SIAE Award	Best Demo	Herself	Won
2006	MArteLive Award	Best song	L'alba	Won
2010	X Factor's Critics Award	Critics Award	Herself	Won
2011	TRL Awards	Best Talent Show Artist	Herself	Nominated

Preceded by Marco Mengoni	X Factor (Italy); Winner; 2010	Succeeded by Francesca Michielin
