= Do You Remember Me? (film) =

- Ti ricordi di me?
- Directed by: Rolando Ravello
- Written by: Edoardo Maria Falcone; Paolo Genovese; Edoardo Leo
- Story by: Massimiliano Bruno
- Starring: Ambra Angiolini; Edoardo Leo
- Cinematography: Vittorio Omodei Zorini
- Music by: Gianluca Misiti
- Release date: 3 April 2014
- Running time: 91 min
- Country: Italy
- Language: Italian

Do You Remember Me? (Italian: Ti ricordi di me?) is a 2014 Italian romantic comedy film directed by Rolando Ravello. It is based on a stage play with the same name. For his performance in this film Edoardo Leo was nominated for Nastro d'Argento for best actor.

== Plot ==
The troubled relationship between a primary school teacher who has narcolepsy and a kleptomaniac supermarket clerk.

== Cast ==
- Ambra Angiolini as Beatrice "Bea" Benassi
- Edoardo Leo as Roberto Marino
- Paolo Calabresi as Francesco
- Susy Laude as Valeria
- Ennio Fantastichini as Amedeo
- Pia Engleberth as Dr. Grimaldi

== See also ==
- List of Italian films of 2014
