= Hollywood Hollywood =

Studio album by Roberto Vecchioni
- Released: 1982
- Genre: Italian singer-songwriters
- Label: Philips
- Producer: Michelangelo Romano

Roberto Vecchioni chronology
Montecristo (1980)	Hollywood Hollywood (1982)	Il grande sogno (1984)

Hollywood Hollywood is an album by Italian singer-songwriter Roberto Vecchioni.

The theme of the title track is cinema, but intermingled with other themes typical of Vecchioni's art: love, women, drinking. "Sestri Levante" is an autobiographical ballad about a painful love experience. "Parigi" (Paris) is another declaration of love for France and its poets, but, as usual, mixed to personal experiences and themes.

"Morgana" and "Dentro gli occhi" are instead two shows of Vecchioni's fable and dream inspiration.

== Trivia ==
- "Fellini 8½" contains excerpts from Nino Rota's main theme of the homonymous movie by Federico Fellini.
- The album features a gatefold cover by the Italian artist Andrea Pazienza.

== Track listing ==
1. "Hollywood Hollywood"
2. "Ricetta di donna/Fellini 8½ "
3. "Dentro gli occhi"
4. "Sestri Levante"
5. "Parigi (o cara)"
6. "Hollywood Hollywood"
7. "Casa dolce casa"
8. "Morgana (luce di giorni passati)"
