= Art, Science and Peace Prize =

Origin of the Prize
- Awarded for: On the occasion of the "World Conference for the Peace and Welfare of Nations"
- Sponsored by: Man Center; World Interreligious Center; European Commission; United Nations
- Location: Monastery of Sargiano, Arezzo
- Country: Italy
- First award: June 29, 2002; 24 years ago

The Art, Science and Peace Prize is awarded every three years. It is given to artists and scientists who have worked for peace and the welfare of society and the world. The Prize is accompanied by a sum of money that can vary in each edition. The Prize is awarded by a jury appointed by the International Non-Profit Organization "Man Center" in collaboration with the World Interreligious Center. Since its foundation, Pier Franco Marcenaro has been the Chairman of the Jury.

== Prize winners ==
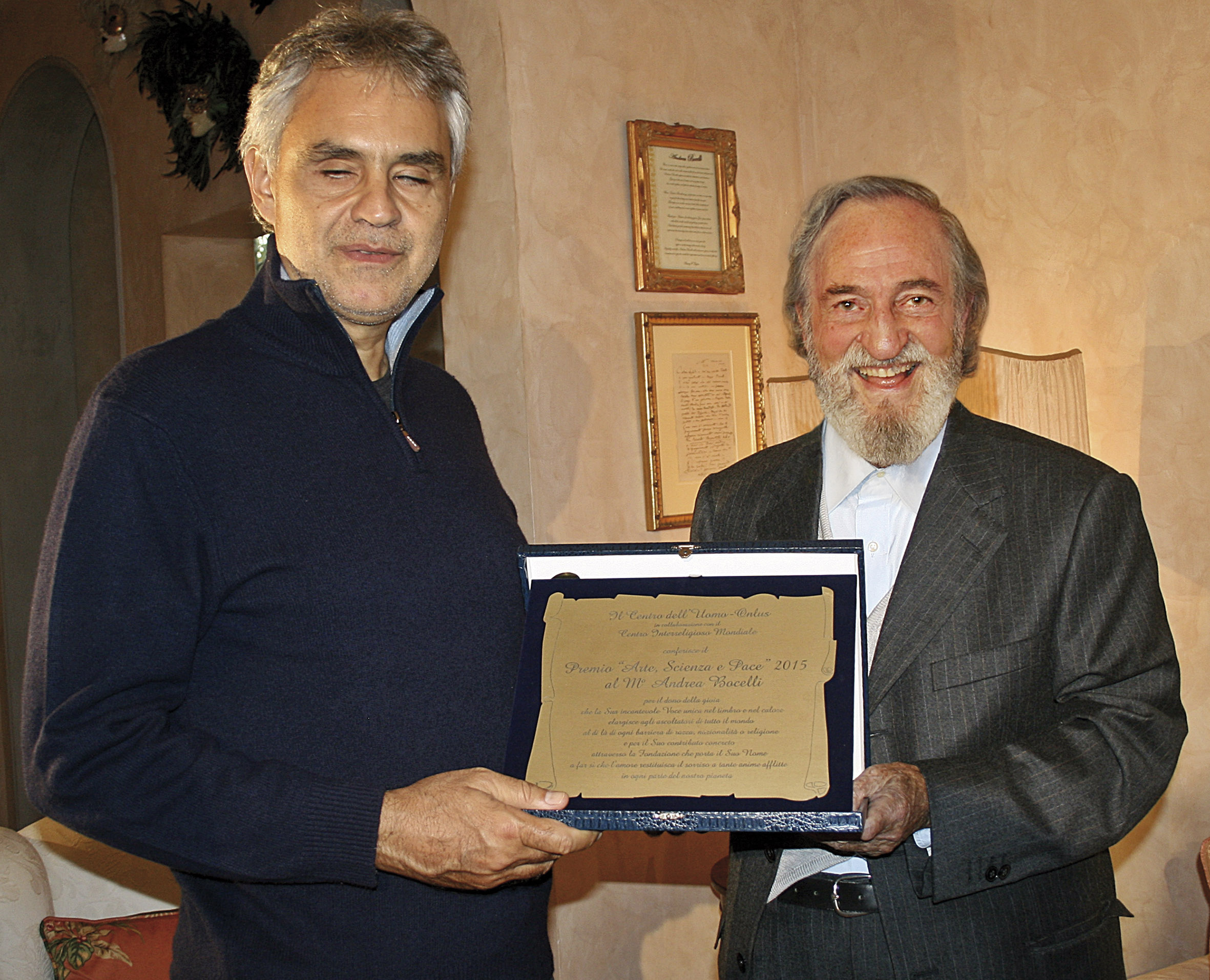
Pier Franco Marcenaro hands over the 2015 Prize to Andrea Bocelli

- 2002: writer and essayist Fernanda Pivano; for translating and disseminating great USA pacifist writers who bring a message of peace and non-violence to the world.
- 2005: director Franco Zeffirelli; for directing the movies Jesus of Nazareth, Brother Sun, Sister Moon and Romeo and Juliet, which have expressed a message of brotherhood and peace worldwide.
- 2008: not awarded.
- 2012: professor Umberto Veronesi; for his long career dedicated to alleviating suffering and spreading principles directed to respect for the human person in the world.
- 2015: tenor Andrea Bocelli. For spreading with his voice a worldwide message of brotherhood and peace, beyond all barriers of race, nationality or religion.
- 2018: actor Roberto Benigni; for his unequalled ability to reach the heart of the public by transmitting a message of high artistic, human and spiritual value aimed at reawakening one's conscience and favoring understanding and love between people and populations.
- 2021: not awarded.
