= Francesca Valtorta =

Italian actress (born 1986)

- Born: 24 February 1986 (age 40); Rome, Italy
- Occupation: Actress
- Years active: 2008–present

Francesca Valtorta (born 24 February 1986) is an Italian actress.

== Early life and career ==
Born in Rome, she was admitted in 2008 to the Centro Sperimentale di Cinematografia where she graduated in December 2010. She also made her debut in 2010 in the film Kiss Me Again directed by Gabriele Muccino, where she co-starred with the role of Anna. In 2011 she starred in the second season of Il commissario Manara 2 directed by Luca Ribuoli. Also in the same year she takes part in the cast of R.I.S. Roma – Delitti imperfetti 2 and 3 directed by Francesco Miccichè and in the Rai fiction Che Dio ci aiuti directed by Francesco Vicario. She also takes part in the short film directed by Gaia Gorrini Il fidanzamento di mia madre with Alessandro Haber and Alessandra Mastronardi. She is one of the protagonists of the theater show L'Orrore, written and directed by Marco Cassini and staged as part of the Maggio Festeggiante theater review in Teramo.

In 2011, she takes part in a music clip of the Italian band About Wayne, The Maniac of the Seventh floor. In 2012 she starred in the film The Immature: The Trip. In 2013 she is engaged in the filming of the sixth season of Squadra antimafia – Palermo oggi, in the role of the new antagonist Rachele Ragno, and she also works with Giacomo Campiotti in the series Braccialetti rossi, in which she plays the role of Cris's sister.

== Filmography ==
=== Film ===
- Kiss Me Again, directed by Gabriele Muccino (2010)
- The Immature: The Trip, directed by Paolo Genovese (2011)
- Ci vuole un fisico, directed by Alessandro Tamburini (2018)
- Flaminia (2024)
- 30 notti con il mio ex (2025)

=== Television ===
- Il commissario Manara, directed by Luca Ribuoli - TV series (2011)
- R.I.S. Roma – Delitti imperfetti, directed by Francesco Miccichè - TV series (2011-2012)
- Che Dio ci aiuti, directed by Francesco Vicario - TV series (2011)
- Braccialetti rossi, directed by Giacomo Campiotti - TV series (2014-2016)
- Le mani dentro la città, directed by Alessandro Angelini - TV series (2014)
- Il restauratore, directed by Giorgio Capitani - TV series (2014)
- A Good Season, directed by Gianni Lepre - TV series (2014)
- Squadra antimafia – Palermo oggi, directed by Pietro Valsecchi - TV series (2014-2016)
- Il paradiso delle signore, directed by Giannandrea Pecorelli - TV series (2015-2018)
- Sacrificio d'amore, directed by Daniele Carnacina - TV series (2017-2018)
- Una nuova vita, directed by Fabrizio Costa - TV miniseries (2026)
