= Le Iene =

Italian television program

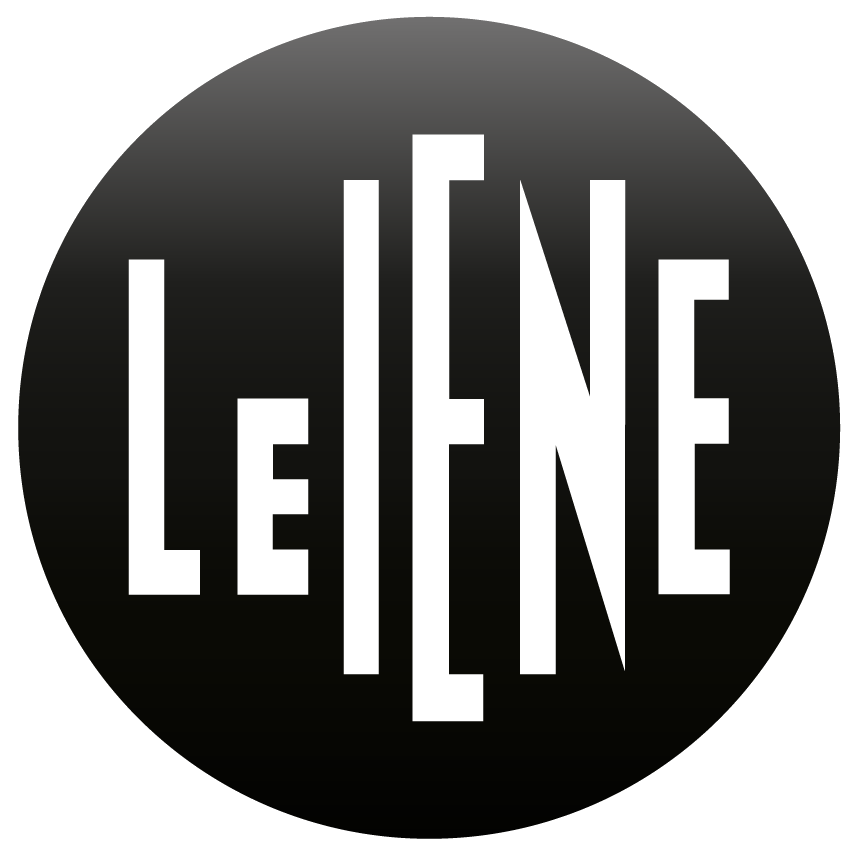
Logo of the program, since 2016

Le Iene (Italian: [le ˈjɛːne]; lit. 'The Hyenas', referencing the Italian name of Quentin Tarantino's 1992 movie Reservoir Dogs) is an Italian television program.

== The program ==
Le Iene is a television program broadcast on the Italian channel Italia 1. Beginning in 1997, it is a comedy/satirical show, with sketches and reports into political affairs and consumer issues. Le Iene is based on an Argentine show Caiga Quien Caiga. Because Le Iene was also the release name in Italy for the Tarantino's film Reservoir Dogs, all the presenters on the program wear (like the protagonists of the Tarantino's movie) trademark black suits, white shirts and black ties. Recurring features of the program, besides the reportage, are the double interviews in which two famous people are asked the same questions, and are edited together on a split-screen, side by side so that they answer one after the other. The first series was hosted by Simona Ventura, Dario Cassini and Peppe Quintale. Since then, many comedians, showgirl, presenter and actors have hosted, such as: Teo Mammucari, Luca Bizzarri, Paolo Kessisoglu, Ilary Blasi, Fabio Volo, Andrea Pellizzari, Alessia Marcuzzi, Miriam Leone, Belén Rodríguez and Luciana Littizzetto. It has featured several writers like Davide Parenti, Lorenzo Maiello, Roberto Marcanti, Andrea Bempensante, and Fabrizio Montagner. The Spanish version aired by Telecinco had to close due to poor ratings, but the program later returned and moved in 2008 to a new network, laSexta.

== Controversies ==
In October 2006, reporter Matteo Viviani from Le Iene covertly tested deputies of Italy's lower house of parliament for drugs, by claiming to be performing TV interviews about the budget, when in fact the "make-up artist" preparing the deputies for the camera was actually swabbing their faces for samples to be tested for drugs. Of the 50 samples from deputies, almost one third tested positive for drug use in the previous 36 hours; 12 for cannabis and 4 for cocaine. When deputies discovered the ruse, they lobbied, on privacy grounds, for the broadcast of the pertinent episode of the show to be blocked, which it was. Matteo Viviani and Davide Parenti had to pay €5000 to avoid going to prison.

In 2013, a report about the controversial stamina therapy was accused of causing pseudo-scientific misinformation.

In October 2015, Stefano Corti, Alessando Onnis, and a cameraman from Le Iene reportedly harassed Moto GP racer Marc Márquez in his garage. Márquez was earlier involved in a controversial collision with Valentino Rossi at the 2015 Malaysian motorcycle Grand Prix. During the altercation, the reporters from Le Iene reportedly attacked Márquez after the latter's father had asked them to leave.
