= The Immature: The Trip =

- Film poster
- Italian: Immaturi - Il viaggio
- Directed by: Paolo Genovese
- Written by: Marco Alessi; Fabrizio Cestaro; Paolo Genovese
- Produced by: Marco Belardi
- Starring: Raoul Bova; Ricky Memphis; Ambra Angiolini; Paolo Kessisoglu; Anita Caprioli; Luca Bizzarri; Barbora Bobuľová; Luisa Ranieri
- Cinematography: Fabrizio Lucci
- Edited by: Patrizio Marone
- Music by: Andrea Guerra
- Release date: 4 January 2012
- Running time: 100 minutes
- Country: Italy
- Language: Italian

The Immature: The Trip (Italian: Immaturi - Il viaggio) is a 2012 comedy film directed by Paolo Genovese, sequel to the 2011 film The Immature.

== Cast ==
- Raoul Bova as Giorgio Romanini
- Ricky Memphis as Lorenzo Coppetti
- Ambra Angiolini as Francesca
- Paolo Kessisoglu as Virgilio
- Anita Caprioli as Eleonora
- Luca Bizzarri as Piero Galeazzi
- Barbora Bobuľová as Luisa
- Luisa Ranieri as Marta
- Maurizio Mattioli as Luigi Coppetti, Lorenzo's father
- Giovanna Ralli as Iole, Lorenzo's mother
- Alessandro Tiberi as Ivano
- Aurora Giovinazzo as Penelope
- Lucia Ocone as Sonia
- Francesca Valtorta as Gloria
- Lavinia Longhi as Rita
- Aurora Cossio as Ina
- Rocío Muñoz Morales as Anna
- Luca Zingaretti as Carlo
- Gabriele Pignotta as the architect
- Vittoria Belvedere as the doctor
- Anna Rezan as the dancer
