= Chiamami ancora amore =

Single by Roberto Vecchioni

from the album Chiamami ancora amore
- Language: Italian
- Released: 16 February 2011
- Genre: Pop
- Length: 4:14
- Label: Universal
- Songwriters: Roberto Vecchioni; Claudio Guidetti
- Producer: Claudio Guidetti

"Chiamami ancora amore" (Italian pronunciation: [ˈkjaːmami aŋˈkoːra aˈmoːre, -mj aŋˈ-]; "Call me 'love' once more") is a song by Italian singer-songwriter Roberto Vecchioni, written by Vecchioni himself, together with Claudio Guidetti, which also produced the track. The song won the 61st Sanremo Music Festival, also receiving the "Mia Martini" Critics' Prize, and the Press, Radio and TV Award.

The song was released as the lead single from Vecchioni's compilation album of the same name. It peaked at number two on the Italian Singles Chart, and it was certified gold by the Federation of the Italian Music Industry.

== Background ==
Describing the lyrical content of the song, Vecchioni claimed it refers to two different "nights" to be fought: "a horrible collective night, and an existential one. We need to agree on something, some kind of faith or hope, otherwise we are not going anywhere". Linguist Giuseppe Antonelli, writing for web magazine Rockol, praised Vecchioni's choice to compose a song with lyrics defending culture and freedom of thought, but using a language which is very close to the commonly spoken Italian.

== Charts ==
Chart (2011)	Peak position
Italy (FIMI)	2
Italy Airplay (EarOne)	13

== Release history ==
Region	Date	Format
Italy	16 February 2011	Mainstream radio
