= In punta di piedi =

Single by Nathalie

from the album In punta di piedi
- Released: 23 November 2010
- Recorded: 2010
- Genre: Pop
- Length: 3:38
- Label: Sony Music
- Songwriters: Natalia Beatrice Giannitrapani (aka Nathalie)

Nathalie singles chronology
"In punta di piedi" (2010)	"Vivo sospesa" (2011)

"In punta di piedi" is the debut single by Nathalie, an Italian singer-songwriter of mixed Tunisian-Belgian origins who won the fourth season of Italian series of The X Factor on 2010.

Written by Nathalie herself, the song was her winner's single. Nathalie performed it for the first time during the semi-finals of the series, aired on 16 November 2010 by Rai 2. The single was officially released by Sony Music as an EP immediately after the announcement of the results with her declared as winner. It hit straight in No. 1 on the Italian Singles Chart for the week 22–29 November 2010 for just one week. The single was later certified gold by the Federation of the Italian Music Industry, for domestic downloads exceeding 15,000 units.

A music video of the song was directed by Saku (Roberto Saku Cinardi) and was made available on 23 December 2010 on Libero TV Web TV portal.

== Charts ==
Chart (2010)	Peak position
Italy (FIMI)	1

=== Year-end charts ===
Chart (2010)	Peak position
Italian Singles Chart	84
