= Luca Bizzarri =

Italian actor and comedian (born 1987)

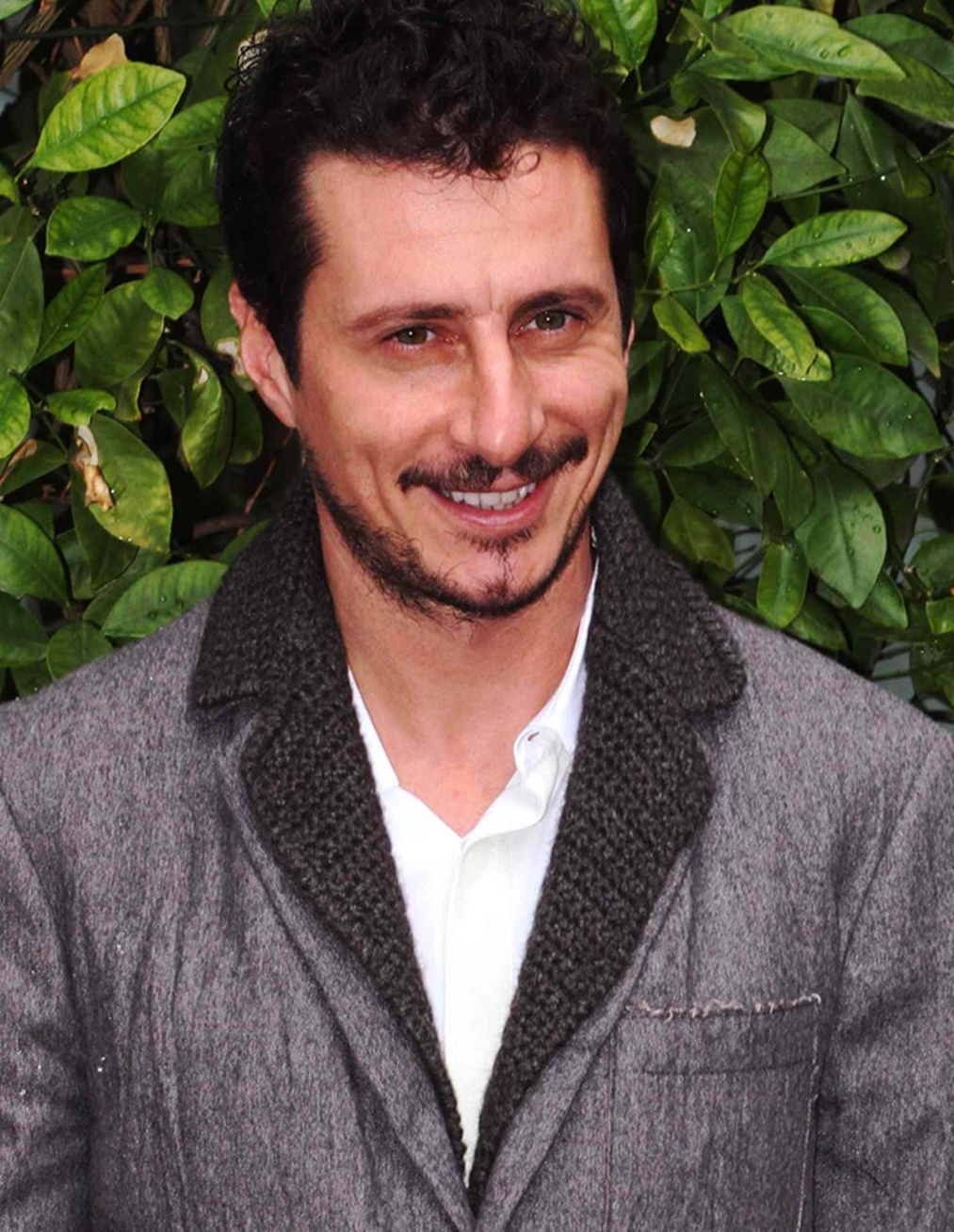
- Bizzarri in 2016
- Born: 13 July 1971 (age 55); Genoa, Liguria, Italy
- Occupations: Actor, comedian, TV and radio host
- Years active: 1994–present

Luca Bizzarri (born 13 July 1971) is an Italian actor, comedian, television and radio host.

== Life and career ==
Starting as a theater actor, Luca Bizzarri graduated from the Genoa's Teatro Stabile acting school in 1994. He gained prominence in theatrical performances and later teamed up with Paolo Kessisoglu to form the comedic duo Luca & Paolo. Together, they appeared in television shows like Le Iene, movies, and sitcoms such as Camera Café. They also co-hosted major TV events, including the Sanremo Music Festival 2011. In 2023, he won the third season of LOL - Chi ride è fuori, together with Fabio Balsamo.

Beyond entertainment, Bizzarri served as president of Genoa's Palazzo Ducale Cultural Foundation from 2017 to 2022.

== Selected filmography ==
Film
Year	Title	Role	Notes
1999	E allora mambo!	Stefano/Ruben	
2000	The Emperor's New Groove	Kuzco (voice)	Italian dub
2000	Tandem	Luca Cavallaro	
2008	Asterix at the Olympic Games	Alpha	
2011	The Immature	Piero Galeazzi	
2012	The Immature: The Trip	Piero Galeazzi	
2013	Colpi di fortuna	Mario	
2014	A Boyfriend for My Wife	Pietro	
2020	Un figlio di nome Erasmus	Ascanio	
2021	Per tutta la vita	Edo	
2022	Il giorno più bello	Giorgio	
2023	Da grandi	Adult Leo	

Television
Year	Title	Role	Notes
2003–2017	Camera Café	Luca Nervi	Sitcom
2007	La strana coppia	Oscar Masi	TV series; 30 episodes
2018	Immaturi: La serie	Piero Mistico	TV series; 8 episodes
2021	Tutta colpa di Freud	Claudio Malesci	TV series; 8 episodes
