= Paolo Kessisoglu =

Italian actor, comedian and TV presenter (born 1969)

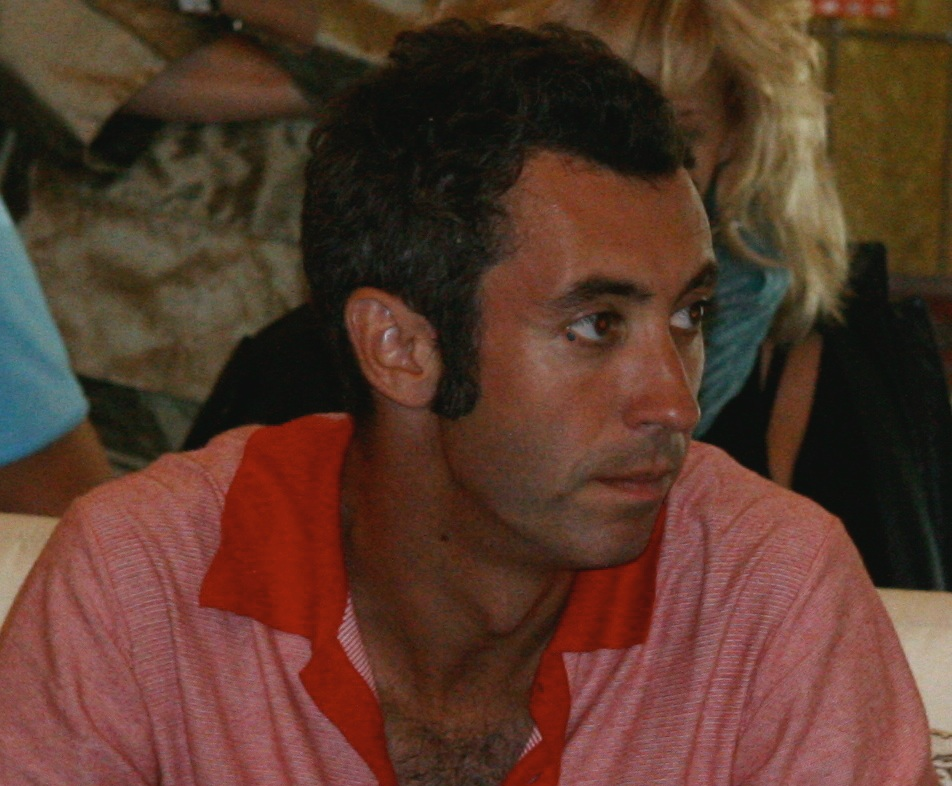
- Kessisoglu at Festival Gaber 2008 in Viareggio
- Born: 25 July 1969 (age 57); Genoa, Italy
- Occupations: Comedian; television presenter; actor; voice actor
- Known for: Part of the duo Luca e Paolo with Luca Bizzarri
- Spouse: Sabrina Donadel (m. 2003)
- Children: 1

Paolo Kessisoglu (Italian pronunciation: [ˈpaːolo kessiˈsɔːɡlu]; born 25 July 1969) is an Italian actor, comedian and television presenter. He is best known for the duo Luca e Paolo, formed with his friend, Luca Bizzarri. Kessisoglu was also a member of the comedic group Cavalli Marci ("Rotten Horses").

== Early and personal life ==
Kessisoglu was born in Genoa to an Armenian family. His paternal grandfather moved as a child with his family from Smyrna (today İzmir, Turkey) to Greece and later to Italy to escape from the Armenian genocide. The family settled in Trieste for several years before finally moving to Genoa. The original surname, Keshishian (Քեշիշյան), was Turkified during the escape in Keşişoğlu (with the Armenian -ian ending replaced by the Turkish patronymic ending -oğlu) to arouse less attention, and then Hellenized to Kesísoglou (Κεσίσογλου).

In June 2003, Kessisoglu married TV anchor and journalist Sabrina Donadel, with whom he has a daughter, Lunita (b. 2003).

== Filmography ==
=== Films ===
Year	Title	Role	Notes
1999	E allora mambo!	Mauro Paternò	
2000	The Emperor's New Groove	Kronk (voice)	Italian dub
2000	Tandem	Pietro Borsello	
2001	The Living Forest	Ho-Ho (voice)	Italian dub
2003	Oggi è una bella giornata	Paolo	Short film
2005	…e se domani	Matteo Cellario	
2008	Asterix at the Olympic Games	Omega	
2008	Tinker Bell	Clank (voice)	Italian dub
2009	Tinker Bell and the Lost Treasure	Clank (voice)	Italian dub
2010	Tinker Bell and the Great Fairy Rescue	Clank (voice)	Italian dub
2011	The Immature	Virgilio Montesi	
2012	The Immature: The Trip	Virgilio Montesi	
2013	Colpi di fortuna	Piero	Segment: "Primo episodio"
2014	Un fidanzato per mia moglie	Pietro	
2020	Un figlio di nome Erasmus	Jacopo	
2021	Per tutta la vita	Mark	
2023	Da grandi	Adult Tato	

=== Television ===
Year	Title	Role	Notes
1997–1998	Ciro, il figlio di Target	Himself/Various	Sketch comedy show (seasons 1–2)
1999	Ciro	Himself/Various	Sketch comedy show
2000–2002	MTV Trip	Himself/co-host	Reality show
2001	Mai dire Gol	Himself/Guest	Sports program (season 11)
2001–2003	Sitting Ducks	Aldo (voice)	Main role; 52 episodes
2001–2011	Le Iene	Himself/co-host	Variety/reality show (seasons 5–11, 13–15)
2003–2017	Camera Café	Paolo Bitta	Co-lead role; 1756 episodes
2004	Superciro	Himself/Various	Sketch comedy show
2007	La strana coppia	Felice "Felix" De Santis	Co-lead role; 30 episodes
2011	Sanremo Music Festival 2011	Himself/co-host	Annual music festival
2011	Così fan tutte	Paolo Bitta	Episode: "Episodio 1"
2012	Scherzi a parte	Himself/co-host	Prank show (season 12)
2014	Giass	Himself/co-host	Game show
2015–2016	Colorado	Himself/co-host	Variety show (seasons 17–18)
2017–present	Quelli che... il Calcio	Himself/co-host	Sports program (seasons 24–present)
2018	Immaturi - La serie	Virgilio Montesi	Main role; 8 episodes
