= The Big Dream (film) =

- Directed by: Michele Placido
- Written by: Michele Placido, Angelo Pasquini, Doriana Leondeff
- Produced by: Pietro Valsecchi
- Starring: Riccardo Scamarcio; Jasmine Trinca; Luca Argentero
- Cinematography: Arnaldo Catinari
- Edited by: Consuelo Catucci
- Music by: Nicola Piovani
- Release date: 2009
- Running time: 101 minutes
- Country: Italy
- Language: Italian

The Big Dream (Italian: Il grande sogno) is a 2009 Italian drama film directed by Michele Placido. It entered the main competition at the 66th Venice International Film Festival, in which Jasmine Trinca won the Marcello Mastroianni Award.

== Plot ==
In 1968, in Rome, at the famous La Sapienza University, a group of young people occupy the institution, starting a student revolt. The group of students is led by the proletarian Libero, son of unemployed workers of Fiat, who wants to permanently change the future for the youth of the country. The police oppose him, while the upper class student Laura falls in love with Libero. In the meantime, however, the Rome police plan to stifle the student revolt, and among these is the young Nicola, who secretly loves the theater, and wants to star in a famous company. When Laura meets Nicola, she changes perspective and the two fall in love. Nicola is tasked by the police to infiltrate the protesters and to discover the weak points so that the police can more easily attack the students.
As soon as the attack begins one day, without warning, Laura discovers the true nature of Nicola, and breaks up with him. While Libero flees to Sicily, avoiding arrest, the young policeman decides to devote himself entirely to the theater.

== Cast ==
- Luca Argentero: Libero
- Riccardo Scamarcio: Nicola
- Jasmine Trinca: Laura
- Marco Iermanò: Andrea
- Brenno Placido: Giulio
- Laura Morante: Maddalena
- Massimo Popolizio: Domenico
- Dajana Roncione: Isabella
- Alessandra Acciai: Francesca
- Silvio Orlando: Police Captain
- Ottavia Piccolo: adult Laura
