= List of Italian films of 2007 =

A list of films produced in Italy in 2007 (see 2007 in film):

| Title | Director | Cast | Genre | Notes |
|---|---|---|---|---|
2007
| 2061: An Exceptional Year | Carlo Vanzina | Diego Abatantuono, Emilio Solfrizzi, Sabrina Impacciatore | Comedy | |
| Il 7 e l'8 | Giambattista Avellino, Ficarra e Picone | Ficarra e Picone, Eleonora Abbagnato, Barbara Tabita | Comedy | |
| Black Sun | Krzysztof Zanussi | Valeria Golino, Kaspar Capparoni | Revenge drama | |
| Il Capo dei Capi | Enzo Monteleone, Alexis Sweet | Claudio Gioè, Daniele Liotti, Salvatore Lazzaro | Crime | |
| Caravaggio | Angelo Longoni | Alessio Boni, Elena Sofia Ricci, Jordi Mollà | Biopic | |
| Cardiofitness | Fabio Tagliavia | Nicoletta Romanoff, Giulia Bevilacqua | Comedy | |
| Come tu mi vuoi | Volfango De Biasi | Cristiana Capotondi, Nicolas Vaporidis | Comedy | |
| Concrete Romance | Marco Martani | Nicolas Vaporidis, Giorgio Faletti, Carolina Crescentini | Neo-noir | |
| Days and Clouds | Silvio Soldini | Antonio Albanese, Margherita Buy | Drama | Entered into the 30th Moscow International Film Festival |
| A Dinner for Them to Meet | Pupi Avati | Diego Abatantuono, Vanessa Incontrada, Inés Sastre | Comedy | |
| Don't Think About It | Gianni Zanasi | Valerio Mastandrea, Anita Caprioli, Giuseppe Battiston, Caterina Murino | Comedy Drama | 3 Venice awards. |
| Don't Waste Your Time, Johnny! | Fabrizio Bentivoglio | Valeria Golino, Fabrizio Bentivoglio | Biopic | |
| Fallen Heroes | Paolo Franchi | Bruno Todeschini, Elio Germano, Irène Jacob, Maria de Medeiros | Crime-drama | Entered into the 64th Venice International Film Festival |
| Family Game | Alfredo Arciero | Sandra Ceccarelli, Stefano Dionisi, Fabio Troiano, Mattia Cicinelli, Elena Bouryka, Manuela Spartà, Eros Pagni | Drama | |
| Flying Lessons | Francesca Archibugi | Giovanna Mezzogiorno, Anna Galiena, Douglas Henshall, Angela Finocchiaro | Drama | |
| Ghost Son | Lamberto Bava | Laura Harring, John Hannah, Pete Postlethwaite | Horror | |
| The Girl by the Lake | Andrea Molaioli | Toni Servillo, Valeria Golino, Fabrizio Gifuni | Giallo | 2 Venice awards. David di Donatello for Best Film |
| Go Go Tales | Abel Ferrara | Willem Dafoe, Bob Hoskins, Matthew Modine, Asia Argento | Comedy | |
| Hidden Love | Alessandro Capone | Isabelle Huppert, Greta Scacchi, Mélanie Laurent | Drama | |
| The Hideout | Pupi Avati | Laura Morante, Rita Tushingham, Treat Williams, Burt Young | Mystery | |
| Imperium: Pompeii | Giulio Base | Lorenzo Crespi, Andrea Osvárt | Drama | |
| In Your Hands | Peter Del Monte | Kasia Smutniak | Drama | |
| I, the Other | Mohsen Melliti | Raoul Bova | Drama | |
| The Lark Farm | Paolo and Vittorio Taviani | Paz Vega, Moritz Bleibtreu, Alessandro Preziosi, Ángela Molina | Drama | |
| Last Minute Marocco | Francesco Falaschi | Valerio Mastandrea, Maria Grazia Cucinotta | Comedy | |
| The Last Mistress | Catherine Breillat | Asia Argento, Fu'ad Aït Aattou | Drama | French-Italian film |
| The Man of Glass | Stefano Incerti | David Coco, Tony Sperandeo, Anna Bonaiuto | Crime | |
| Manual of Love 2 | Giovanni Veronesi | Carlo Verdone, Monica Bellucci, Riccardo Scamarcio, Sergio Rubini | Romantic comedy | |
| Maradona, the Hand of God | Marco Risi | Marco Leonardi | Biopic | |
| Miss F | Daniele Luchetti | Filippo Timi, Valeria Solarino, Sabrina Impacciatore | Drama | |
| The Mother of Tears | Dario Argento | Asia Argento, Daria Nicolodi, Moran Atias | Horror | |
| My Brother Is an Only Child | Daniele Luchetti | Elio Germano, Riccardo Scamarcio, Angela Finocchiaro | Drama | 4 David di Donatello |
| Night Bus | Davide Marengo | Giovanna Mezzogiorno, Valerio Mastandrea, Ennio Fantastichini | Neo-noir | |
| One Hundred Nails | Ermanno Olmi | Raz Degan | Drama | Screened at the 2007 Cannes Film Festival |
| Piano, solo | Riccardo Milani | Kim Rossi Stuart, Michele Placido, Jasmine Trinca, Alba Rohrwacher | Biopic | |
| Il Pirata: Marco Pantani | Claudio Bonivento | Rolando Ravello, Nicoletta Romanoff | Biopic | |
| The Right Distance | Carlo Mazzacurati | Giovanni Capovilla, Valentina Lodovini, Giuseppe Battiston, Fabrizio Bentivoglio | Drama | |
| Saturn in Opposition | Ferzan Özpetek | Pierfrancesco Favino, Margherita Buy, Stefano Accorsi, Isabella Ferrari, Ambra Angiolini, Serra Yilmaz | Drama | Gay interest. Ambra Angiolini won David di Donatello |
| The Seer | Luigi Desole | Michele Morrow, Bella Thorne, Alexander Fiske-Harrison | Thriller | |
| Seven Kilometers from Jerusalem | Claudio Malaponti | Luca Ward, Rosalinda Celentano, Alessandro Haber | Religion | |
| St. Giuseppe Moscati: Doctor to the Poor | Giacomo Campiotti | Giuseppe Fiorello, Ettore Bassi, Kasia Smutniak | Biopic | |
| Sympathy for the Lobster | Sabina Guzzanti | Sabina Guzzanti, Cinzia Leone, Antonello Fassari | Mockumentary | |
| The Sweet and the Bitter | Andrea Porporati | Luigi Lo Cascio, Donatella Finocchiaro, Fabrizio Gifuni, Renato Carpentieri | Crime-drama | Entered into the 64th Venice International Film Festival |
| The Trial Begins | Vincenzo Marra | Fanny Ardant, Michele Lastella | crime-drama | Entered into the 64th Venice International Film Festival |
| Valzer | Salvatore Maira | Maurizio Micheli, Valeria Solarino, Benedicta Boccoli | Drama | |
| I Vicerè | Roberto Faenza | Alessandro Preziosi, Lando Buzzanca, Cristiana Capotondi | Drama | |
