= 2007 in Italian television =

This is a list of Italian television related events from 2007.

== Events ==
- 6 January – Olympic silver medal long jumper Fiona May and her partner Raimondo Todaro win the third season of Ballando con le stelle.
- 19 April – Milo Coretti wins the seventh season of Grande Fratello.
- 23 November – Actress and showgirl Maria Elena Vandone and her partner Samuel Peron win the fourth season of Ballando con le stelle.

== Debuts ==
=== International ===
- 8 October – (Canada) / (United Kingdom) Franny's Feet (Rai 2) (2003–2010)

== Television shows ==
=== Drama ===
- Rino Gaetano, Ma il cielo è sempre più blu (But the sky is more and more blue) – biopic by Marco Turco, with Claudio Santamaria in the title role, Kasia Smutniak and Laura Chiatti; 2 episodes. The movie is criticized by the family of the singer, for his depiction as an alcoholic and the insertion of an imaginary love story.
- Il pirata: Marco Pantani – biopic by Claudio Bonivento, with Rolando Ravello in the title role and Nicoletta Romanoff.

=== Variety ===
- Ballando con le stelle (2005–present)

=== Mediaset ===
- Grande Fratello (2000–present)

== Networks and services ==
=== Launches ===
Network	Type	Launch date	Notes	Source
Cooltoon	Cable and satellite	1 May		
MTV Classic	Cable and satellite	31 August		
Nat Geo Music	Cable and satellite	October		
MTV Pulse	Cable and satellite	1 October		
Iris	Cable and satellite	30 November		

=== Conversions and rebrandings ===
Old network name	New network name	Type	Conversion Date	Notes	Source
Paramount Comedy	Comedy Central	Cable and satellite	29 April		

== See also ==
- List of Italian films of 2007
