= Maria Di Biase =

Italian actress and comedian (born 1974)

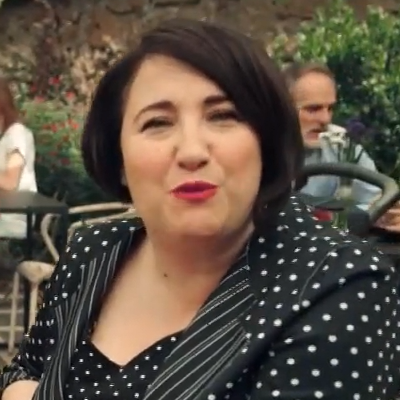
- Di Biase in 2019
- Born: 17 December 1974 (age 51); Montreal, Quebec, Canada
- Occupations: Actress, writer, comedian
- Years active: 2002–present

Maria Di Biase (born 17 December 1974) is an Italian actress, writer and comedian.

== Life and career ==
Born in Montreal, Canada, Di Biase raised in Bonefro, in Molise, Italy. After studying mathematics at the University of Bologna, she developed an interest in acting and met Corrado Nuzzo, with whom she formed the comedy duo "Nuzzo e Di Biase". They made their television debut in 2003 and gained prominence through appearances on shows such as Mai dire lunedì and Mai dire reality by Gialappa's Band, portraying various characters. As a film actress, Di Biase appeared in films including La matassa (2009) and It May Be Love But It Doesn't Show (2011). In 2018, she co-wrote and co-directed her first feature film, I'll Come Too, together with Nuzzo.

In 2020, Di Biase was cast in her first leading role as Carmen, Aldo's wife, in the film I Hate Summer by Aldo, Giovanni e Giacomo. Subsequently, she secured prominent roles in the comedy films Bla Bla Baby by Fausto Brizzi and Needing a Friend? by Alessandro Siani.

Since 2018, she has been involved in radio broadcasting with the program Numeri uni on Rai Radio 2. In 2022, Di Biase competed in the second season of LOL - Chi ride è fuori on Amazon Prime Video, also participating in its spin-off Prova prova sa sa the following year.

== Personal life ==
Di Biase has been in a relationship with her colleague Corrado Nuzzo since 1997. They are not married and do not have children.

== Filmography ==
Film
Year	Title	Role	Notes
2009	La matassa	Svetlana	
2011	It May Be Love But It Doesn't Show	Natasha's friend	
2014	Amici come noi	Marika	
2015	The Last Will Be the Last	Loredana	
2016	Tiramisù	Pizzaiolo's wife	
2016	What's the Big Deal	Linda	
2018	I'll Come Too	Maria	Also writer and director
2018	Arrivano i prof	Prof. Melis	
2020	I Hate Summer	Carmen	
2022	Bla Bla Baby	Celeste	
2023	Needing a Friend?	Filomena	
2023	Lea e il fenicottero	Benedetta	Short film

== Television programs ==
- I Caruso (Happy Channel, 2003)
- Bulldozer (Rai 2, 2003)
- Tutti a scuola (Rai 1, 2003)
- Mai dire Grande Fratello & figli (Italia 1, 2004–2006; Canale 5, 2006)
- Mai dire lunedì (Italia 1, 2005)
- Mai dire reality (Italia 1, 2006)
- Mai dire martedì (Italia 1, 2007)
- Zelig (Canale 5, 2009–2016, 2021)
- Se stasera sono qui (La7, 2012)
- Quelli che... il calcio (Rai 2, 2013–2015)
- Alessandro Borghese - Celebrity Chef (TV8, 2022)
- LOL - Chi ride è fuori (Amazon Prime Video, 2022)
- LOL Xmas Special (Amazon Prime Video, 2022)
- Prova prova sa sa (Amazon Prime Video, 2023)
- Name That Tune - Indovina la canzone (TV8, 2023)
- Pour parler (Rai 2, 2023)
- RIP: Roast in Peace (Amazon Prime Video, 2025)
