= Abbagnato =

Abbagnato is a surname. Notable people with the surname include:

- Anastasia Abbagnato (born 2003), Italian tennis player
- Eleonora Abbagnato (born 1978), Italian ballet dancer, model, and actress
