= Inter. Due stelle sul Cuore =

- Directed by: Carlo A. Sigon
- Screenplay by: Marco Curti; Carlo A. Sigon
- Story by: Marco Curti
- Produced by: Antonio Abete; Emanuele Tulli
- Cinematography: Giuseppe Ceravolo
- Edited by: Guido Notari
- Production companies: Filmmaster; Red Joint Film; Inter Media House
- Distributed by: Nexo Studios
- Release date: 19 September 2024
- Running time: 90 minutes
- Country: Italy
- Language: Italian

Inter. Due stelle sul Cuore (Inter. Two Stars on the Heart) is a 2024 Italian independent sports documentary. The film was directed by Carlo A. Sigon.

== Synopsis ==
The film tells the story of Inter's journey to winning their 20th championship, through exclusive interviews and stories from players, fans, and Nerazzurri celebrities.

== Cast ==
- Lautaro Martínez as himself
- Marcus Thuram as himself
- Hakan Çalhanoğlu as himself
- Federico Dimarco as himself
- Nicolò Barella as himself
- Henrikh Mkhitaryan as himself
- Yann Sommer as himself
- Alessandro Bastoni as himself
- Davide Frattesi as himself
- Francesco Acerbi as himself
- Matteo Darmian as himself
- Carlos Augusto as himself
- Yann Aurel Bisseck as himself
- Kristjan Asllani as himself
- Benjamin Pavard as himself
- Stefan de Vrij as himself
- Marko Arnautović as himself
- Giuseppe Marotta as himself
- Alessandro Antonello as himself
- Javier Zanetti as himself
- Simone Inzaghi as himself
- Gabriele Salvatores as himself
- Luciano Ligabue as himself
- Rose Villain as herself
- Matilde Gioli as herself

== See also ==
- Cinema of Italy
- List of association football films
