= Needing a Friend? =

- Italian: Tramite amicizia
- Directed by: Alessandro Siani
- Written by: Gianluca Ansanelli; Alessandro Siani
- Produced by: Massimo Di Rocco; Federica Lucisano; Fulvio Lucisano
- Starring: Alessandro Siani; Max Tortora; Matilde Gioli; Maria Di Biase
- Cinematography: Giovanni Canevari
- Edited by: Valentina Mariani
- Music by: Umberto Scipione
- Release date: 14 February 2023
- Running time: 90 minutes
- Country: Italy
- Language: Italian
- Box office: $3,212,885

Needing a Friend? (Italian: Tramite amicizia) is a 2023 Italian comedy film directed by Alessandro Siani.

The film was shot in Ferrara and Paris. It was released in Italy on 14 February 2023.

== Cast ==
- Alessandro Siani as Lorenzo Monaco
- Max Tortora as Alberto Dessè
- Matilde Gioli as Maya
- Maria Di Biase as Filomena
- Yari Gugliucci as Ernesto
- Cecilia Dazzi as Fiorenza
- Germano Lanzoni as the Chief of Police
- Gianni Fantoni as the psychotherapist
- Taiyo Yamanouchi as the Japanese boss
- Teresa Del Vecchio as Lorenzo's aunt
- Pippo Santonastaso as Luigi
- Miloud Mourad Benamara as Kiran
- Bruno Gouery as the robber
- Debora Villa as Marisa Calasole
- Roberta Bedogni as Anita
- Enzo Paci and Amedeo Gagliardi as the traffic policemen
- Emanuele Vezzoli as Alberto's lawyer
