= Vincenzo Malinconico, Unsuccessful Lawyer =

2022 Italian television series

- Title card
- Italian: Vincenzo Malinconico, avvocato d'insuccesso
- Genre: Comedy-drama
- Based on: Series by Diego De Silva
- Directed by: Alessandro Angelini (season 1); Luca Miniero (season 2)
- Starring: Massimiliano Gallo; Denise Capezza; Francesco Di Leva; Teresa Saponangelo; Giulia Bevilacqua
- Country of origin: Italy
- No. of seasons: 2
- No. of episodes: 12

Production
- Production companies: Rai Fiction; Viola Films

Original release
- Network: Rai 1
- Release: 20 October 2022 – present

Vincenzo Malinconico, Unsuccessful Lawyer (Italian: Vincenzo Malinconico, avvocato d'insuccesso) is a 2022 Italian comedy-drama television series based on the novels by Diego De Silva. It stars Massimiliano Gallo as the title character, and debuted on Rai 1 on 20 October 2022.

== Cast ==
=== Main ===
- Massimiliano Gallo as Vincenzo Malinconico, a civil attorney in Salerno, who is divorced from Nives and is the father of Alagia and Alfredo
- Denise Capezza as Alessandra Persiano (season 1), a beautiful criminal attorney and Malinconico's love interest
- Francesco Di Leva as Amodio Tricarico, a member of the Camorra who befriends Malinconico and assists him with his cases
- Teresa Saponangelo as Nives Cervi, Malinconico's ex-wife and the mother of Alagia and Alfredo.
- Giulia Bevilacqua as Clelia Cusati (season 2), a journalist and Malinconico's love interest

=== Supporting ===
- Giovanni Ludeno as Espedito Lenza, an accountant and old friend of Malinconico's who shares office space with him
- Luca Gallone as Benny La Calamita, a colleague of Malinconico who became an attorney to please his lawyer father, and is unhappy with his career
- Chiara Celotto as Alagia Malinconico, Nives's daughter and Malinconico's step-daughter
- Francesco Cavallo as Alfredo Malinconico, Malinconico and Nives's son
- Lina Sastri as Assunta, Nives's mother and Malinconico's former mother-in-law

== Episodes ==
=== Overview ===
Series	Episodes	Originally released	
Series	Episodes	First released	Last released
1	6	20 October 2022	10 November 2022
2	4	1 December 2024	16 December 2024

=== Season 1 ===
No. overall	No. in season	Title	Directed by	Written by	Original release date
1	1	"I Didn't Understand Anything - Part One" (Non avevo capito niente - Parte prima)	Alessandro Angelini	Unknown	20 October 2022
2	2	"I Didn't Understand Anything - Part Two" (Non avevo capito niente - Parte seconda)	Alessandro Angelini	Unknown	20 October 2022
3	3	"The Refrigerators of Lonely Men - Part One" (I frigoriferi degli uomini soli - Parte prima)	Alessandro Angelini	Unknown	27 October 2022
4	4	"The Refrigerators of Lonely Men - Part Two" (I frigoriferi degli uomini soli - Parte seconda)	Alessandro Angelini	Unknown	27 October 2022
5	5	"A Quarter of an Hour of Celebrity - Part One" (Un quarto d'ora di celebrità - Parte prima)	Alessandro Angelini	Unknown	3 November 2022
6	6	"A Quarter of an Hour of Celebrity - Part Two" (Un quarto d'ora di celebrità - Parte seconda)	Alessandro Angelini	Unknown	3 November 2022
7	7	"Divorce with Style - Part One" (Divorzio con stile - Parte prima)	Alessandro Angelini	Unknown	10 November 2022
8	8	"Divorce with Style - Part Two" (Divorzio con stile - Parte seconda)	Alessandro Angelini	Unknown	10 November 2022

=== Season 2 ===
No. overall	No. in season	Title	Directed by	Written by	Original release date
9	1	"Episode 1"	Luca Miniero	Unknown	1 December 2024
10	2	"Episode 2"	Luca Miniero	Unknown	8 December 2024
11	3	"Episode 3"	Luca Miniero	Unknown	15 December 2024
12	4	"Episode 4"	Luca Miniero	Unknown	16 December 2024

== Production ==
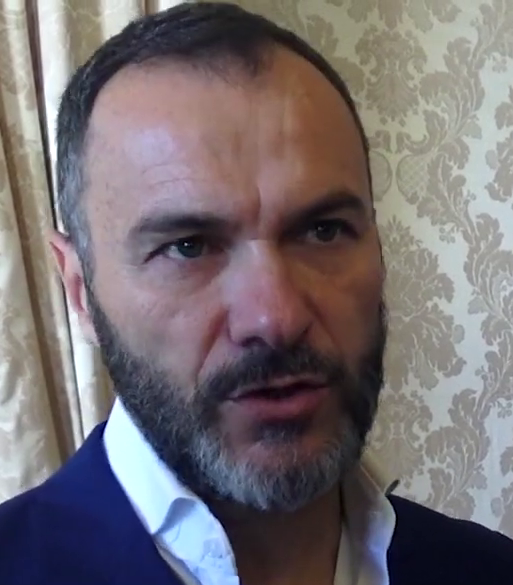
Massimiliano Gallo portrays Vincenzo Malinconico.

Vincenzo Malinconico, Unsuccessful Lawyer is based on the novels by Diego De Silva. It stars Massimiliano Gallo as the title character. The series is produced by Rai Fiction and Viola Film. Season one was directed by Alessandro Angelini,and season two was directed by Luca Miniero.

In 2023, the series was confirmed for a second season.

In June 2025, Gallo announced that a third season of the series was forthcoming, and scheduled for release in 2026.

== Release ==
The series was first presented at the Monte-Carlo Television Festival in 2022, where it was nominated for a Golden Nymph Award for Best TV Series.

Season one debuted on Rai 1 on 20 October 2022, and concluded on 10 November 2022.

Season two was broadcast on Rai 1 from 1 December 2024. to 16 December 2024.
