= What's the Big Deal =

- Theatrical release poster
- Directed by: Edoardo Leo
- Screenplay by: Alessandro Aronadio; Marco Bonini; Edoardo Leo; Renato Sannio
- Story by: Alessandro Aronadio; Edoardo Leo; Renato Sannio
- Produced by: Federica Lucisano; Fulvio Lucisano
- Starring: Edoardo Leo; Anna Foglietta; Rocco Papaleo
- Cinematography: Alessandro Pesci
- Edited by: Patrizio Marone
- Music by: Gianluca Misiti
- Production companies: Warner Bros. Entertainment Italia; Italian International Film
- Distributed by: Warner Bros. Pictures
- Release date: 9 November 2016
- Running time: 105 minutes
- Country: Italy
- Language: Italian
- Box office: $1.7 million

What's the Big Deal (Italian: Che vuoi che sia) is a 2016 Italian comedy film directed and starring Edoardo Leo.

== Plot ==
A young man challenges the web to offer money for a sex tape of him and his girlfriend to finance his work and finally be able to afford having a child. Is it really wrong to sell our own intimacy to afford realizing our dreams?

== Cast ==
- Edoardo Leo as Claudio
- Anna Foglietta as Anna
- Rocco Papaleo as Franco
- Giampiero Judica as Marco
- Marina Massironi as Ivana
- Pierpaolo Spollon as Paolo
- Massimo Wertmüller as Manlio
- Bebo Storti as Ugo
- Maria Di Biase as Linda
