= Tutti contro tutti =

- Directed by: Rolando Ravello
- Written by: Massimiliano Bruno; Rolando Ravello
- Produced by: Domenico Procacci
- Starring: Rolando Ravello; Kasia Smutniak; Marco Giallini
- Cinematography: Paolo Carnera
- Edited by: Clelio Benevento
- Music by: Alessandro Mannarino
- Production company: Fandango
- Distributed by: Warner Bros. Pictures
- Release date: 28 February 2013
- Country: Italy
- Language: Italian

Tutti contro tutti is a 2013 Italian comedy drama film directed by Rolando Ravello and released on February 28, 2013, by Warner Bros. Pictures.

== Cast ==
- Rolando Ravello as Agostino
- Kasia Smutniak as Anna
- Marco Giallini as Sergio
- Stefano Altieri as Nonno Rocco
- Lidia Vitale as Romana
- Antonio Gerardi as Antonio Macchiusi
- Flavio Bonacci as Viperetta
- Ivano De Matteo as Mazzetti
- Agnese Ghinassi as Erica
- Raffaele Lorio as Lorenzo
- Giorgio Caputo as Perdigiorno
- Riccardo De Filippis as Perdigiorno
- Raffaele Vannoli as Tossico
- Lorenza Indovina as Maestra
- Paolo Sassanelli as Tonino Rizzuti
