= Andiamo a quel paese =

- Theatrical release poster
- Directed by: Ficarra e Picone
- Written by: Ficarra e Picone
- Starring: Ficarra e Picone
- Cinematography: Roberto Forza
- Music by: Carlo Crivelli
- Distributed by: Medusa Film
- Release date: 6 November 2014
- Running time: 90 minutes
- Country: Italy
- Language: Italian

Andiamo a quel paese (Italian for "Let's go to that village", a play on the phrase Vai a quel paese!, "Go to hell!") is a 2014 Italian comedy film written, directed and starred by the comedy duo Ficarra e Picone. It premiered out of competition at the 2014 Rome Film Festival.

It was a box office hit, grossing over 8 million euros. It was also the most successful film starred by the comedy duo.

== Plot ==
Salvo and Valentino are two friends who, along with Salvo's wife Donatella and daughter Adele, are evicted from their home in Palermo. With no job prospects, the four relocate to Salvo's hometown of Monteforte, where he is hoping for a job recommendation through a connection with a local bigwig named La Duca. In the meantime, the family relies on the economic support of the retirement benefits of Donatella's mother. Monteforte, once a thriving town thanks to the orange trade, is now economically destitute and the pensions of its elderly citizens are now the only source of income: Salvo finds himself forced to live not only with his mother-in-law, but also with Donatella's aunt Carmela. He only agrees to this after discovering that Aunt Carmela herself has a sizable pension.

Valentino, in the meantime, reconnects with Roberta, the daughter of the superintendent of the local Carabinieri, with whom he had a relationship in his youth before leaving for Palermo. Salvo continues to reflect on the considerable number of his wife's relatives who receive a pension, and he considers the idea of gathering them all to live together in order to get himself authorized to handle their pension withdrawals. This scheme works until some of the relatives begin to die one by one, and the other relatives, convinced that the house is cursed, begin to leave until only Aunt Lucia is left. She is in good health but of an advanced age, and Salvo must think of how to continue to profit off of her. He decides to arrange for her to marry Valentino, who is against the idea.

Aunt Lucia, who has already suffered a heart attack in the past, collapses when Salvo reveals his idea to her. At the hospital, however, she tells the family that she intends to go through with the plan to pass on her pension. The news of the nuptials spreads quickly throughout the town and Valentino becomes the object of gossip of all of Monteforte. Slowly Salvo's scheme gains popularity and the elderly women become desirable to the unemployed men of the town. The parish priest of Monteforte, Father Benedetto, tries to convince Valentino and Aunt Lucia to come to their senses and call off the wedding. The evening before the wedding, Lucia goes to the church for Mass. When it gets late, Salvo and Valentino go looking for her at the church, where they overhear her speaking with Father Benedetto: the two have loved one another for years, but the priest does not want to leave the priesthood despite his love for Lucia.

Back at home, Salvo and Valentino speak with her and together they decide to go forward with the wedding. However, the next morning, the priest interrupts the ceremony, declaring his love for Lucia and showing that he has left the priesthood. Valentino is then free to go to Roberta and finally reveal to her that he is still in love with her. At the end of the film, Valentino and Salvo are waiting to be received by La Duca in order to receive his recommendation; however, they discover that he has recently died.

== Cast ==
- Ficarra as Salvo
- Picone as Valentino
- Tiziana Lodato as Donatella
- Lily Tirinnanzi as Aunt Lucia
- Fatima Trotta as Roberta
- Francesco Paolantoni as Brigadier
- Maria Vittoria Martorelli as Adele
- Mariano Rigillo as Father Benedetto
- Maria Kozhevnikova
- Nino Frassica as Barber
- Christian Maggio (actor) himself
- Ludovico Caldarera as Carmelo
- Giancarlo Ratti as padre Raffaele
- Orio Scaduto as procuratore della Repubblica

== See also ==
- List of Italian films of 2014
