= Killer in Red =

- Directed by: Paolo Sorrentino
- Written by: Paolo Sorrentino
- Story by: J. Walter Thompson
- Starring: Clive Owen
- Release date: 24 January 2017
- Running time: 13 minutes
- Country: Italy
- Language: English

Killer in Red is a 2017 Italian short film directed by Paolo Sorrentino and starring Clive Owen. It is based on an original story by J. Walter Thompson. It is also an advertisement for Campari.

== Cast ==
- Clive Owen as Floyd
- Caroline Tillette as Lady in Red
- Tim Ahern as Mixologist
- Linda Messerklinger as Brunette
- Tom Ashley as Young Mixologist
- Steve Osborne as Producer
- Emily M. Bruhn as Blonde
- Denise Capezza as Young Woman in Black
