= Volevo un figlio maschio =

- Directed by: Neri Parenti
- Written by: Gianluca Bomprezzi; Neri Parenti; Pier Paolo Piciarelli
- Produced by: Flavia Parnasi; Daniele Spinozzi
- Starring: Enrico Brignano; Giulia Bevilacqua
- Cinematography: Gino Sgreva
- Edited by: Luca Montanari
- Music by: Bruno Zambrini
- Distributed by: Medusa Film
- Release date: 5 October 2023
- Running time: 102 minutes
- Country: Italy
- Language: Italian

Volevo un figlio maschio (transl. I wanted a son) is a 2023 Italian comedy film directed by Neri Parenti.

== Cast ==
- Enrico Brignano as Alberto
- Giulia Bevilacqua as Emma
- Mariano Rigillo as Arturo
- Clizia Fornasier as Lara
- Giovanni Guardiano as Piero
- Maurizio Marchetti as the school principal
- Viktorie Ignoto as Anastasia
- Maurizio Casagrande as Dario
- Cristina Bignardi as the teacher
