= Eleonora Abbagnato =

Italian ballet dancer

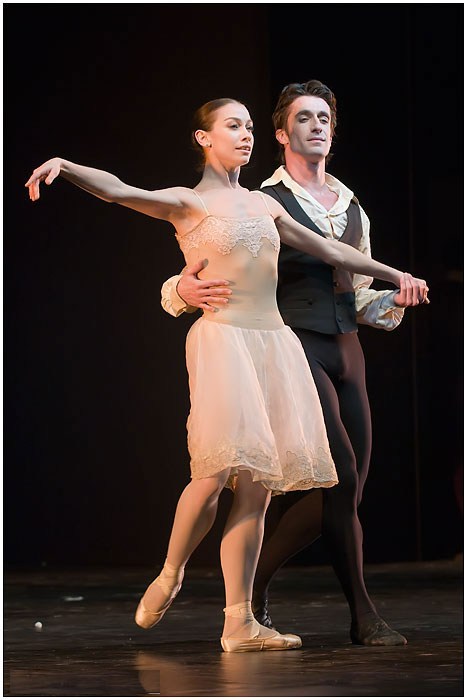
- Abbagnato (left) in 2010
- Born: 30 June 1978 (age 47); Palermo, Sicily, Italy
- Occupations: Ballet dancer; television personality; actress
- Employer: Paris Opera Ballet (1996–2021)
- Spouse: Federico Balzaretti (m. 2011)
- Children: 2

Eleonora Abbagnato (Italian pronunciation: [eleoˈnɔːra abbaɲˈɲaːto]; born 30 June 1978) is an Italian ballet dancer, model, and actress. Between 2013 and 2021 she was ètoile at the Paris Opera Ballet.

== Early life and education ==
Born in Palermo, Abbagnato started dancing at 5 years old, and at 12 she moved to Monte Carlo to enroll in the dance school of Marika Bresobrasova. At 13, she toured Europe with Roland Petit's The Sleeping Beauty, in the role of Aurora as a child. She was then admitted, after a private audition, to the École de Danse of the Paris Opera as a fellowship student.

== Career ==
In 1996, at the age of 18, Abbagnato graduated and joined the corps de ballet of the Opera, where she made a rapid ascent: Coryphée in 1999, Sujet in 2000, Premiere Danseuse in 2001 and Étoile in March 2013. In 2007, Abbagnato debuted as an actress in the film Il 7 e l'8 with Ficarra e Picone. On 18 February 2009, she joined Paolo Bonolis in hosting the second night of the Sanremo Music Festival. The same year, she released her autobiography Un angelo sulle punte (An Angel on her toes).

In 2012, she was the subject of a photographic exhibition with pictures by Massimo Gatti that was held in Milan, Los Angeles, London and Miami. In 2015, Abbagnato was appointed director of the corps de ballet of the Teatro dell'Opera di Roma. Abbagnato was first set to retire from Paris Opera Ballet after a performance of Le Parc in 2019. However, due to the dancers' strike, her farewell had to be delayed. She then chose to have special performance that features works she danced over the course of her career. The show was scheduled on 18 May 2020. However, due to the COVID-19 pandemic and its impact on the performing arts, the performance was cancelled. She eventually bade her farewell to the stage on 12 June 2021 performing a Hommage a Roland Petit.

== Personal life ==
Abbagnato married football player Federico Balzaretti on 13 June 2011. They have two children.

== Filmography ==
=== Film ===
Year	Title	Role	Director	Notes
2007	Il 7 e l'8	Eleonora	Ficarra e Picone, Giambattista Avellino	Feature film debut as an actress
2016	Ballerina	Odette (voice)	Éric Summer, Éric Warin	Italian dub; voice role

=== Television ===
Year	Title	Role	Notes
2009	Sanremo Music Festival 2009	Herself	Italian annual music festival; host in the second episode
2013–2017	Amici di Maria De Filippi	Herself	Italian talent show; coach (season 12); judge (season 16)
2016	Prodigi - La musica è vita	Herself	Italian talent show; judge (season 1)
2023	Scuola di danza - I ragazzi dell'opera	Herself	Docuseries
