= Cardiofitness =

2007 film by Fabio Tagliavia

- Directed by: Fabio Tagliavia
- Written by: Marco Ponti; Barbara Frandino; Lucia Moisio
- Starring: Nicoletta Romanoff; Federico Costantini
- Cinematography: Stefano Ricciotti
- Music by: Alberto Caruso
- Distributed by: 01 Distribution
- Release date: 2007
- Country: Italy
- Language: Italian

Cardiofitness (Italian pronunciation: [ˌkardjoˈfitnes]) is a 2007 romantic comedy film directed by Fabio Tagliavia and starring Nicoletta Romanoff. It is based on a novel with the same name by Alessandra Montrucchio.

== Cast ==
- Nicoletta Romanoff as Stefania
- Federico Costantini as Stefano
- Giulia Bevilacqua as Cecilia
- Sarah Felberbaum as Ilaria
- Daniele De Angelis as Guido
- Fabio Troiano as Maurizio
- Dino Abbrescia as Nick
- Nina Torresi as Cinzia
- Manuela Kustermann as Stefania's Mother
- Gianni Carretta Pontone as Carlo
- Gisella Burinato as Moira
- Stefano Sardo as Jean-Claude
- Giorgio Colangeli as The General

== See also ==
- List of Italian films of 2007
