= Mariano Rigillo =

Italian actor

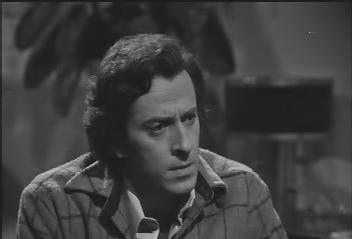
- Mariano Rigillo (1976)
- Born: 12 September 1939 (age 85); Naples, Italy
- Occupation: Actor
- Years active: 1964–present

Mariano Rigillo (born 12 September 1939) is an Italian actor.

== Biography ==
In the 1960s, Rigillo attended the Silvio d'Amico National Academy of Dramatic Arts and began his career on stage playing roles in plays by William Shakespeare, Carlo Goldoni, Bertolt Brecht and Luigi Pirandello, and in those years he met Giuseppe Patroni Griffi with whom he has worked on numerous occasions.

In addition to his career as a theatrical, cinematographic and television actor, Rigillo also worked as a voice actor, giving his voice to Harvey Keitel in Camorra, Ben Gazzara in Il camorrista and Geoffrey Rush in Elizabeth and Elizabeth: The Golden Age.

== Selected filmography ==
- Metti, una sera a cena (1969) - Comedian
- Metello (1970) - Olindo Tinai
- Chronicle of a Homicide (1972) - Luca Binda
- Bronte: cronaca di un massacro che i libri di storia non hanno raccontato (1972) - Nino Bixio
- The Infamous Column (1972)
- Soldier of Fortune (1976) - Albimonte da Peretola
- The Black Corsair (1976)
- Arrivano i bersaglieri (1980) - La Marmora
- Il camorrista (1986) - Il Professore (voice)
- Regina (1987)
- Il Postino: The Postman (1994) - Di Cosimo
- Passaggio per il paradiso (1998) - Lorenzo
- La strategia della maschera (1998) - Windisch-Roth
- Un affare trasversale (1998)
- Per tutto il tempo che ci resta (1998) - Michele Galvano
- A Respectable Man (1999) - Giudice Istruttore Giorgio Fontana
- Sottovento! (2001) - Il professore
- I Can See It in Your Eyes (2004) - Longone
- E ridendo l'uccise (2005) - Boschetti
- The Lark Farm (2007) - Assadour
- Flying Lessons (2007) - Rabbino
- Prova a volare (2007)
- Un amore di Gide (2008) - Gesuino
- Marcello Marcello (2008) - Mayor Del Ponte
- Per Sofia (2009) - Riccardo, padre Isak
- Sorry If I Want to Marry You (2010) - Padre di Alex
- Anna, Teresa e le resistenti (2010)
- Box Office 3D: The Filmest of Films (2011) - Officiante (segment "Il Codice Teomondo Scrofalo")
- To Rome with Love (2012) - Anna's Client
- 100 metri dal paradiso (2012)
- Malanapoli - la ventunesima stella (2013)
- Andiamo a quel paese (2014) - Padre Benedetto
- Leone nel basilico (2014) - Renato
- Oscar (2016) - Oscar ( old )
- Cinderella the Cat (2017) - Renato
- Edhel (2017) - Ermete
- Gatta Cenerentola (2017) - Vittorio Basile (voice)
- Solo no (2019)
- Gli anni più belli (2020) - The lawyer
- Like a Cat on a Highway 2 (2021)
- Volevo un figlio maschio (2023)
