= Bla Bla Baby =

- Directed by: Fausto Brizzi
- Written by: Fausto Brizzi; Paola Mammini; Herbert Simone Paragnani; Mauro Uzzeo
- Produced by: Luca Barbareschi
- Starring: Alessandro Preziosi; Matilde Gioli; Massimo De Lorenzo; Maria Di Biase; Chiara Noschese; Cristiano Caccamo; Nicolas Vaporidis; Nina Torresi; Nico Di Renzo; Fabrizio Nardi
- Cinematography: Federico Annicchiarico
- Edited by: Luciana Pandolfelli
- Music by: Bruno Zambrini
- Release date: 7 April 2022
- Running time: 94 minutes
- Country: Italy
- Language: Italian

Bla Bla Baby is a 2022 Italian fantasy comedy film directed by Fausto Brizzi.

It was released in Italy on 7 April 2022.

== Cast ==
- Alessandro Preziosi as Luca
- Matilde Gioli as Silvia
- Massimo De Lorenzo as Ivano
- Maria Di Biase as Celeste
- Chiara Noschese as Doriana
- Cristiano Caccamo as Mattia De Bortoli
- Nicolas Vaporidis as Herbert
- Nina Torresi as Simona
- Nico Di Renzo as Mauro
- Fabrizio Nardi as Ignazio
- Pietro and Leonardo Veronese as Martino
  - Voiced by Edoardo Vivio
- Nathan and Luis Loi as Giangi
  - Voiced by Emanuele Puccio
- Cecilia and Livia Trivella as Bettina
  - Voiced by Isaia Follega
- Melissa and Valeria Di Fusco as Loredana
  - Voiced by Emma Puccio
- Mattia and Samuele Gennuso as Renatino
  - Voiced by Arturo Sorino
- Adele Ammendola as herself
