= The Trial Begins =

2007 Italian crime film written and directed by Vincenzo Marra

- Directed by: Vincenzo Marra
- Written by: Vincenzo Marra
- Starring: Fanny Ardant; Michele Lastella
- Cinematography: Luca Bigazzi
- Edited by: Luca Benedetti
- Release date: 2007
- Country: Italy
- Language: Italian

The Trial Begins (Italian: L'ora di punta, also known as Rush Hour) is a 2007 Italian crime drama film written and directed by Vincenzo Marra. It entered the competition at the 64th Venice International Film Festival.

== Cast ==
- Fanny Ardant as Caterina
- Michele Lastella as Filippo Costa
- Giulia Bevilacqua as Francesca
- Augusto Zucchi as Comandante Salvi
- Antonio Gerardi as Donati
- Barbara Valmorin as Anna
- Nicola Labate as Patrizi
- Giacomo Piperno as Rizzi
- Kiara Tomaselli as Filippo's Secretary
- Loredana Martinez as Donati's Secretary

== See also ==
- List of Italian films of 2007
