= Four to Dinner =

- Italian: Quattro metà
- Directed by: Alessio Maria Federici
- Written by: Martino Coli
- Starring: Ilenia Pastorelli; Matilde Gioli; Giuseppe Maggio; Matteo Martari; Marta Gastini; Flavio Furno; Nicola Lagioia
- Release date: 5 January 2022
- Running time: 105 minutes
- Country: Italy
- Language: Italian

Four to Dinner (Italian: Quattro metà) is a 2022 Italian romantic comedy film directed by Alessio Maria Federici, written by Martino Coli and starring Matilde Gioli, Giuseppe Maggio, Ilenia Pastorelli, and Matteo Martari.

== Cast ==
- Matilde Gioli
- Giuseppe Maggio
- Matteo Martari
- Tommaso Basili as Alberto
- Ilenia Pastorelli
- Soraia Tavares
- Elmano Sancho
- Mauro Hermínio
- Luís Filipe Eusébio
- Cristiano Piacenti
- Beatrice Barrilà
