= Denise Capezza =

Italian actress (born 1989)

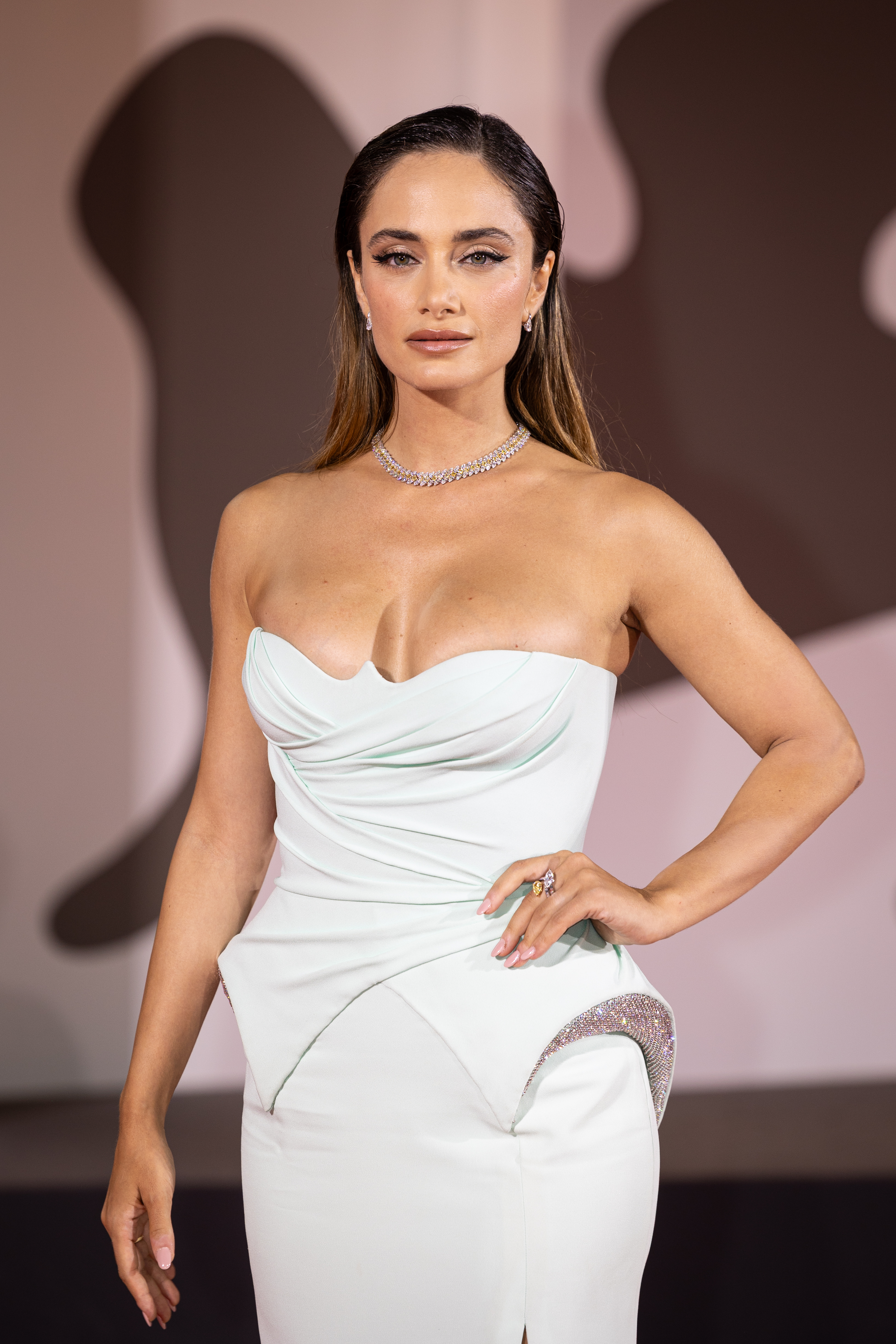
- Capezza at the 2024 Venice Film Festival
- Born: 7 November 1989 (age 35); Naples, Italy
- Occupation: Actress
- Years active: 2012–present
- Spouse: Michele Rosiello (m. 2023)
- Website: denisecapezza.it

Denise Capezza (born 7 November 1989) is an Italian actress.

== Biography ==
Capezza was born in Naples and was raised by a single mother in Portici. She studied classical dance before an injury forced her to quit. Following the injury, she began studying acting at Teatro Elicantropo in Naples and later at the Accademia Beatrice Bracco in Rome.

She married fellow Neapolitan actor Michele Rosiello in 2023.

== Filmography ==
=== Film ===
| Year | Title | Role | Notes | Ref. |
|---|---|---|---|---|
| 2016 | Hep Yek | Camilla | | |
| 2017 | Killer in Red | Young Woman in Black | Short film | |
| 2018 | San Valentino Stories | Chiara | | |
| 2020 | Cobra non è | Angela | | |
| 2022 | Crimes of the Future | Odile | | |
| 2024 | Diva Futura | Moana Pozzi | | |

=== Television ===
| Year | Title | Role | Notes | Ref. |
|---|---|---|---|---|
| 2012 | Uçurum | Felicia Matei | | |
| 2013–2014 | İnadına Yaşamak | Gina | | |
| 2014 | Düşler ve Umutlar | Asya | | |
| 2016–2017 | Gomorrah | Marinella | 5 episodes | |
| 2019–2020 | Baby | Natalia | 8 episodes | |
| 2022 | Bang Bang Baby | Giuseppina Ferraù | 9 episodes | |
| 2022 | Vincenzo Malinconico, avvocato d'insuccesso | Alessandra Persiano | 4 episodes | |
| 2023 | Unwanted | Diletta | 8 episodes | |
| 2024 | Sul più bello - La serie | Aurora | 6 episodes | |
| 2024 | Deceitful Love | Marina | 5 episodes | |
| 2024 | Wonderboys: The Secret Treasure of Naples | Samantha | | |
| 2024–2025 | Portrait of a Scandalous Family | Aniesi | 15 episodes | |
