= Miloud Mourad Benamara =

Italian-Algerian actor

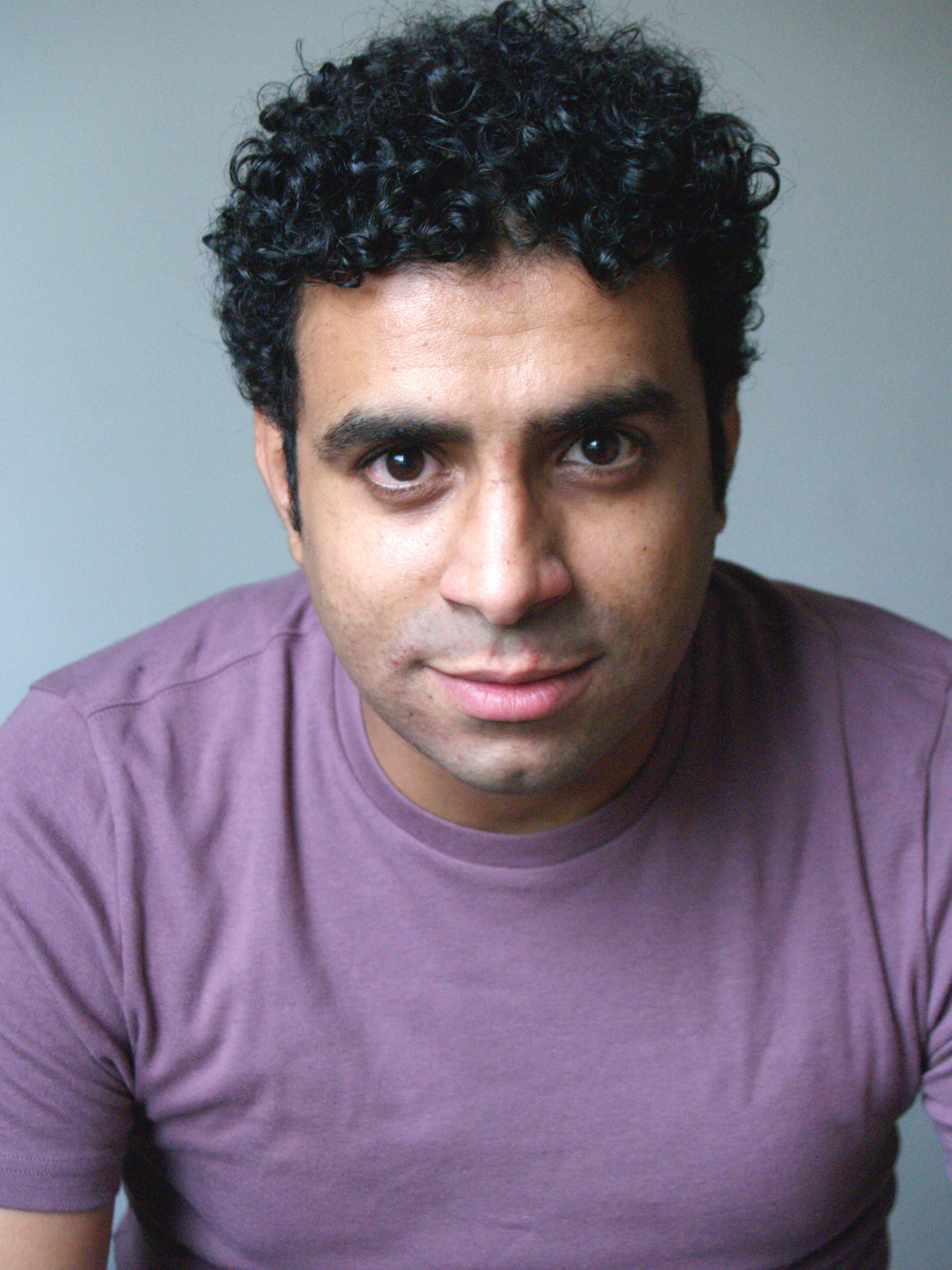
- Born: 28 October 1977 (age 49); Oran, Algeria
- Occupation: Actor
- Years active: 1998–present

Miloud Mourad Benamara (born 28 October 1977) is an Algerian-born Italian actor.

== Early life ==
Benamara is originally from Oran; he studied drama in Algeria before moving to Italy.

== Career ==
In Italy, Benamara has frequently appeared in character actor roles in film and television, usually as an Arab, whether a terrorist or a businessman. He played a street sweeper in the 2015 James Bond film Spectre (2015), and plays Omar, one of three Iraqi businessmen, in the 2021 House of Gucci. In 2021 he doubled Tahar Rahim for Arabic dialog in the film The Mauritanian.

In 2026, the actor performed in Antonio Pisu's play Genitori vs Figli (Parents vs. Children) at the Teatro Sette in Rome, a production of the Teatro Stabile d'Abruzzo.

== Filmography ==
=== Film ===
| Year | Title | Role | Notes |
|---|---|---|---|
| 2014 | Vite in gioco | C.I.A agent | |
| 2014 | Ameluk | Abdul | |
| 2015 | Si accettano miracoli | Karim | |
| 2015 | Spectre | Street Sweeper | |
| 2016 | Poveri ma ricchi | Farouk | |
| 2018 | Finalmente sposi | Amir | |
| 2019 | Nour | Latif | |
| 2021 | House of Gucci | Omar | |
| 2021 | The Mauritanian | Mohamedou Ould Slahi | voice actor |
| 2022 | La ballata dei gusci infranti | Don Ghali | |
| 2023 | Needing a Friend? | Kiran | |

=== Television ===
| Year | Title | Role | Notes |
|---|---|---|---|
| 2011 | Un amore e una vendetta | L'uomo arabo in spiaggia | Episode #1.3 |
| 2012–2013 | Gourmet Wars | Lavapiatti del meneghino | 29 episodes |
| 2016 | Rocco Schiavone | Ahmed | Episode: "La costola di Adamo" |
| 2018 | Murders at Barlume | Abdel | Episode: "Il battesimo di Ampelio" |
| 2020 | Giustizia per tutti | Cherif | Episode #1.4 |
| 2021 | Mina Settembre | Ahmed Bassir | Episode: "Amare è lottare" |

== Awards ==
- In 2019 he won, in Quercianella in the province of Livorno, the award for best actor for the short film Humam by Carmelo Segreto (Premio Quercia).
- Best Actor Protagonist: in The Strange Show of Mr. Ortis at the Sikania Film Festival, Italy, 2024, Sicily.
