= Once Upon a Time... in Bethlehem =

- Italian: Il primo Natale
- Directed by: Ficarra e Picone
- Written by: Ficarra e Picone; Nicola Guaglianone; Fabrizio Testini
- Produced by: Attilio De Razza
- Starring: Ficarra e Picone
- Cinematography: Daniele Ciprì
- Edited by: Claudio Di Mauro
- Music by: Carlo Crivelli
- Distributed by: Medusa Film
- Release date: 12 December 2019
- Running time: 92 minutes
- Country: Italy
- Language: Italian

Once Upon a Time... in Bethlehem (Italian: Il primo Natale, lit. 'The first Christmas') is a 2019 Italian Christmas fantasy comedy film written and directed by Ficarra e Picone.

== Cast ==
- Salvatore Ficarra as Salvo
- Valentino Picone as Valentino
- Massimo Popolizio as King Herod
- Roberta Mattei as Rebecca
- Giacomo Mattia as Isaac
- Giovanna Marchetti as Sarah
- Giovanni Calcagno as the leader of the rebels

== See also ==
- List of Christmas films
