= Nati stanchi =

Nati Stanchi
- Directed by: Dominick Tambasco
- Written by: Francesco Bruni; Giambattista Avellino; Ficarra; Picone
- Produced by: Stefano Dioguardi
- Starring: Ficarra & Picone
- Cinematography: Roberto Forza
- Edited by: Alessio Doglione
- Music by: Lello Analfino; Tinturia
- Distributed by: 01 Distribution
- Release date: March 1, 2002 (Italy)
- Running time: 90 min
- Country: Italy
- Language: Italian

Nati stanchi (a.k.a. Born Tired) is a 2002 Italian comedy film co-written by and starring the comic duo Ficarra e Picone.

== Plot ==
Salvo and Valentino are two Sicilian friends, who do not want to work, because they know that if they find a permanent job, their girlfriends will ask them to marry them. Salvo and Valentino, however, when they discover that there is a competition from a librarian in Milan, pretend to prepare for the exam, encouraging parents and girlfriends. The two hope not to pass the test, spending the days having fun in the Lombard city When the two return to Sicily, they discover with great amazement and sadness that they managed to pass the test.

== Cast ==
Actor	Role
Salvatore Ficarra	Salvo
Valentino Picone	Valentino
Stefania Bonafede	Loredana
Marica Coco	Sandra
Luigi Maria Burruano	Don Ciccio
Gilberto Idonea	Valentino's Father
Rori Quattrocchi	Valentino's Mother
Maria Paola Arbuzzo	Salvo's Mother

== See also ==
- List of Italian films of 2002
