= From the Waist Up =

- Film poster
- Italian: Dalla vita in poi
- Directed by: Gianfrancesco Lazotti
- Written by: Gianfrancesco Lazotti
- Produced by: Pierpaolo Paoluzi
- Starring: Cristiana Capotondi; Filippo Nigro; Nicoletta Romanoff
- Cinematography: Alessandro Pesci
- Release date: July 2010 (Taormina Film Festival)
- Running time: 85 minutes
- Country: Italy
- Language: Italian

From the Waist Up (Italian: Dalla vita in poi) is a 2010 Italian film, written and directed by Gianfrancesco Lazotti.

== Plot ==
Rosalba (Nicoletta Romanoff) loves Danilo (Filippo Nigro), a young man who is serving a long prison sentence. To ease his detention, she decides to write him a sweet letter every day. However it is not easy to translate her feelings into words, so she turns to her best friend Katia (Cristiana Capotondi) for help, who now is on a wheelchair. Katia takes on the role of love promoter, just like Cyrano de Bergerac, but it soon becomes complicated, as little by little those emotions, those poetic lines conceived for Rosalba, become her own, and Danilo's passionate replies begin to belong to Katia. When Rosalba and Danilo break up, Katia sets out to meet him in prison, to see what the man she has fallen for actually looks like. Unfortunately, as she is not a relative, she can't obtain a permission to see him. However, her will is stronger than the rules.

== Cast ==
- Cristiana Capotondi - Katia
- Filippo Nigro - Danilo
- Nicoletta Romanoff - Rosalba
- Pino Insegno - Superintendent Ciarnò
- Carlo Buccirosso - Prison director
- Gianni Cinelli - Assistant Vitale
- Carlo Giuseppe Gabardini - Social worker
- Arcangelo Iannace - Don Paolino
- Norma Vadori - Miriam Pontozzi
- Donatella Rimoldi - Katia's mother
- Pio Milano - Moreno

== Awards ==
- Special Grand Prix of the jury (Montreal World Film Festival): Gianfrancesco Lazotti
- Best Picture (Taormina Film Fest): Gianfrancesco Lazotti
- Best Actor in a Leading Role (Taormina Film Fest): Filippo Nigro
- Best Actress in a Leading Role (Taormina Film Fest): Cristiana Capotondi
