= Il 7 e l'8 =

- Film poster
- Directed by: Giambattista Avellino and Ficarra e Picone
- Produced by: Attilio De Razza
- Starring: Ficarra e Picone; Eleonora Abbagnato; Barbara Tabita
- Cinematography: Roberto Forza
- Music by: Carlo Crivelli
- Distributed by: Medusa Film
- Release date: March 16, 2007
- Running time: 90 minutes
- Country: Italy
- Language: Italian
- Box office: $10.4 million (Italy)

Il 7 e l'8 (lit. '7 and 8') is a 2007 film, directed by Salvatore Ficarra, Valentino Picone and Giambattista Avellino and portrayed by the comic duo Ficarra and Picone. Together with the two comedians, the dancer Eleonora Abbagnato makes her movie debut.

The film obtained in 2007 a nomination for the David di Donatello and to the Nastri d'argento for the best debutant director.

== Plot ==
Palermo, January 6, 1975, in the maternity ward of a clinic, nurse Gino La Monica, to re-claim the fate that made him lose the opportunity to win the first prize of the New Year's lottery, since his ticket differs by a single one number compared to the winning one (the 7 instead of the 8), decides to swap the babies in the cribs 7 and 8.

For the thirty years the two men grow up one in the family of the other, unaware of their swap. Tommaso has become a petty criminal who still lives in his mother's house, a widow, together with his sister Eleonora; while Daniele is a far behind law student, the son of an oppressive Carabinieri colonel, with a relationship to a university assistant, Marcella. Tommaso and Daniele are two deeply different individuals, from their temperament, their personal history and their social level. About thirty years later, a random meeting takes place between them, indeed, a clash: one in a hurry because he's late for an interview with the supervisor of the thesis at the university, the other one while he runs away from the police who's chase him by smuggling.

Destiny brings them together, and a series of elements leads them to realize the swap that has seen them protagonists from infants. From that moment, the awareness of being one instead of the other triggers a series of misunderstandings that seems to never end. When they finally go back to La Monica, who reveals everything to him, a new twist takes over, since while Daniele tries to reveal to his mother that he's not actually his son, the existence of a third father, the biological one of Tommaso, Tommaso "Mimmo" Barresi, who had been sentenced to a long sentence for murder.

As they are investigating, the only clue that Tommaso and Daniele discover on Barresi is a postcard that arrived a few weeks earlier from a mysterious Calabrian country, San Giovanni in Calice. The two therefore leave for the region together with Eleonora, who in the meantime had fallen in love with Daniele; This, before Tommaso reveals the truth. Once to a Franciscan convent, here they make the knowledge of Friar Antonio, from whom they come to know that Barresi died a couple of years earlier. Disappointed, the three return to Palermo where the love at first sight between Tommaso and Marcella, while Eleonora and Daniele learn to love each other as brother and sister, waiting for the propitious time to reveal the truth to their parents who, although they do not suspect anything even though having in the meantime known better following the vicissitudes of their children.

In reality, the friar encountered in San Giovanni in Calice is Mimmo Barresi, prey to remorse for his old life, who, after confronting his superior, leaves the convent determined to take on his paternal responsibilities towards his son.

== Cast ==
- Salvatore Ficarra as Tommaso Scavuzzo / Barresi
- Valentino Picone as Daniele La Blasca / Scavuzzo
- Eleonora Abbagnato as Eleonora Scavuzzo
- Barbara Tabita as Marcella
- Andrea Tidona as Colonel La Blasca
- Lucia Sardo as Miss La Blasca
- Consuelo Lupo as Miss Scavuzzo
- Remo Girone as Mimmo Barresi
- Arnoldo Foà as Padre Superiore
- Tony Sperandeo as Gino La Monica
- Paride Benassai as Ernesto
- Cristina Parodi as herself

== Deleted scenes ==
The scene explaining Tommaso reason for stealing the street signs, because he planned to resell them in stock at a discount to the mayors of Sicilian villages was deleted. The scene however, it is on the special features of the home video edition of the DVD.

== Production ==
Ficarra & Picone, launched by the small screen in cabaret transmissions such as Zelig and L'ottavo nano, after making his debut in the cinema in 2002 as actors in tired births try the great leap in quality by passing to the direction. Shot with the collaboration of Giambattista Avellino.

=== Filming ===
The movie was shot mainly in Palermo (Province and Altavilla Milicia) and Messina (province and in the medieval village of Santa Lucia del Mela, the latter setting of the fictitious town of San Giovanni in Calice), as well as some sequences in Villa San Giovanni, in the Calabrian province.

== Distribution and proceeds ==
The movie was released in Italy on March 16, 2007. It collected about 1 323 000 euros in the first weekend, and totally about 7 730 000 euros. The movie was a hit with the public and received critical acclaim. (In Italy) the DVD was released on September 5, 2007, while the soundtrack on April 13, 2007. The movie was released in Italy on March 16, 2007. It collected about 1 323 000 euros in the first weekend, and totally about 7 730 000 euros.

== Recognition ==
- 2007 – David di Donatello
  - Nomination for best new director to Giambattista Avellino, Salvo Ficarra and Valentino Picone.
- 2007 – Nastro d'Argento
  - Nomination for best new director to Giambattista Avellino, Salvo Ficarra and Valentino Picone.
- 2007 – Capri – Hollywood Film Festival
  - Award for the Capri company to Salvo Ficarra and Valentino Picone.

== Soundtrack ==
- Un corpo e un'anima (Wess & Dori Ghezzi)
- Il ballo di San Vito (Vinicio Capossela)
