= Cooltoon =

Italian television channel

- Country: Italy

Programming
- Language: Italian
- Picture format: 4:3 SDTV

Ownership
- Owner: Cultoon Television Limited

History
- Launched: May 1, 2007
- Replaced: Cultoon
- Closed: April 1, 2011

Cooltoon was an Italian television channel that broadcast anime and cult-animation programming on Sky Italia. It began broadcasting in 2007 and ceased transmission on 1 April 2011.

== Programming ==
- Captain Harlock
- Daltanius
- Desert Punk
- Fat Albert and the Cosby Kids
- Filmation's Ghostbusters
- Future Boy Conan
- Great Teacher Onizuka
- La Linea
- He-Man
- InuYasha
- Invincible Steel Man Daitarn 3
- Ōgon Bat
- Robotech
- Ranma ½
- Saiyuki
- She-Ra
- Six God Combination Godmars
- Samurai 7
- The New Adventures of Flash Gordon
- Transformers
- Urusei Yatsura
