= Giambattista Avellino =

Italian director and screenwriter

- Born: 18 November 1957 (age 68); Livorno, Italy
- Occupations: Director; Screenwriter

Giambattista Avellino (born 18 November 1957) is an Italian director and screenwriter.

== Life and career ==
Born in Livorno, Avellino started his career as a comic book writer, collaborating with the magazines Skorpio and Lanciostory. He debuted as a screenwriter in 1991, for the Aldo Lado's TV-miniseries La stella del parco.

After an intense career on television, Avellino signed his first screenplay for a theatrically released film in 2002, for the Ficarra e Picone's vehicle Nati stanchi. His collaboration with the Sicilian comedy duo continued with Il 7 e l'8 and La matassa, both which they co-directed. For Il 7 e l'8 Avellino and Ficarra e Picone were nominated to David di Donatello for Best New Director and to Silver Ribbon in the same category.

== Selected filmography ==
Screenwriter

- Nati stanchi (2002)
- Easy! (2011)

Director and screenwriter

- Il 7 e l'8 (2007)
- La matassa (2009)
- Some Say No (2011)
