= Giulia Bevilacqua =

Italian actress (born 1979)

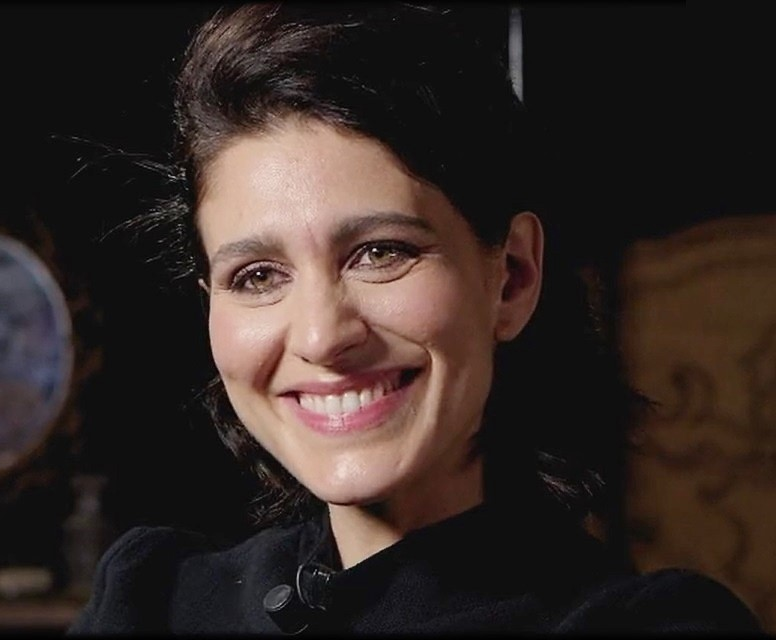
- Bevilacqua in 2022
- Born: 19 May 1979 (age 47); Rome, Italy
- Occupation: Actress

Giulia Bevilacqua (born 19 May 1979) is an Italian film, stage and television actress.

== Life and career ==
Born in Rome, the younger daughter of two architects, Bevilacqua studied at the Accademia Filarmonica as a chorister, and then attended at the Centro Sperimentale di Cinematografia.

Early in her career, Bevilacqua appeared in a number of music videos, including ones with Bon Jovi and Tiromancino.

Since 2002 she has appeared in various TV series. In 2005, she played Paola Alimonti in the Italia 1 series Grandi domani. In the same year, she had her breakthrough in Distretto di Polizia, portraying police officer Anna Gori from the fifth through the ninth seasons.

Bevilacqua made her theatre debut in 2004 in Le ragioni della disfatta directed by Pierpaolo Sepe. In 2007, she debuted in cinema with Cardiofitness, directed by Fabio Tagliavia, and in the same year was co-star in The Trial Begins, directed by Vincenzo Marra.

In 2010, she worked on Ale e Franz Sketch Show on Italia 1. Around the same time, she appeared in the film Come trovare nel modo giusto l’uomo sbagliato alongside Francesca Inaudi and Enrico Silvestrin, with whom she had previously worked on Distretto di Polizia. She also appeared in television productions such as Dov’è mia figlia? and Il delitto di via Poma, both broadcast in autumn 2011.

In 2022, she was among the leads in the film Il principe di Roma, opposite Marco Giallini and directed by Edoardo Falcone. She returned to the big screen in January 2024 under the direction of Leonardo Pieraccioni in the film Pare parecchio Parigi, and in January 2025 she appeared in the film When Mom Is Away... With the In-laws.

== Personal life ==
On 30 September 2017, Bevilacqua married journalist Nicola Capodanno in a civil ceremony in Positano. The couple have two children: a daughter, Vittoria, born on 16 November 2018, and a son, Edoardo, born on 28 May 2020.

== Filmography ==
=== Film ===
Year	Title	Role(s)	Notes
2005	Achille e la tartaruga	Afrodite	Short film
2007	Cardiofitness	Cecilia	
2007	The Trial Begins	Francesca	
2009	Feisbum: The Movie	Valeria Gemma	
2011	Come trovare nel modo giusto l'uomo sbagliato	Penelope	
2012	100 metri dal paradiso	Marcella	
2014	Blame Freud	Barbara	
2015	Natale col Boss	Sara	
2016	Tiramisù	Stefania	
2017	Tainted Souls	Simona	
2018	The King's Musketeers	Milady	
2021	Ritorno al crimine	Lorella	
2022	Tre sorelle	Sabrina	
2022	C'era una volta il crimine	Lorella	
2022	Il principe di Roma	Teta	
2023	Volevo un figlio maschio	Emma	
2024	Pare parecchio Parigi	Ivana Cannistracci	
2025	When Mom Is Away... With the In-laws	Mara	
2025	Giulia del ghetto	Costanza Limentani	

=== Television ===
Year	Title	Role(s)	Notes
2003	Un medico in famiglia	Maya	Episode: "Le belle statuine"
2004	Saint John Bosco: Mission to Love	Bosco's sister-in-law	Two-parts television movie
2004	Don Matteo	Evelina De Magistris	Episode: "Gara di ballo"
2005	Grandi domani	Paola Alimonti	Main role
2005–2011	Distretto di Polizia	Agent Anna Gori	Main role (season 5-9); guest star (season 11)
2010	Ale e Franz Sketch Show	Various	Series regular
2011	Dov'è mia figlia?	Valentina	Miniseries
2011	Il delitto di via Poma	Paola Cesaroni	Television movie
2012	Nero Wolfe	Rosa Petrini	Main role
2013	Come un delfino	Anna	Main role (season 2)
2014–2015	Fuoriclasse	Gaia Marciali	Main role (season 2-3)
2015–2018	È arrivata la felicità	Valeria Camilli	Main role
2017	Amore pensaci tu	Anna Moscati	Main role
2020–2021	Cops - Una banda di poliziotti	Maria Cercola	Main role
2022	Più forti del destino	Arianna Di Villalba	Miniseries
2023	Il metodo Fenoglio: L'estate fredda	Serena Morandi	Main role
2023	Una mamma all'improvviso	Claudia	Television movie
2023–2024	Il patriarca	Elisa Giorgi	Main role
2024	Vincenzo Malinconico, Unsuccessful Lawyer	Clelia Cusati	Main role (season 2)
