= Matilde Gioli =

Italian television and film actress (born 1989)

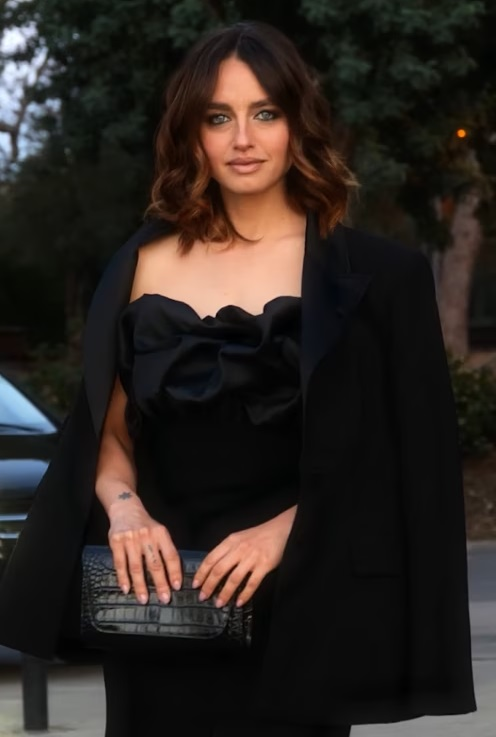
- Gioli in 2024
- Born: Matilde Lojacono; 2 September 1989 (age 37); Milan, Italy
- Education: University of Milan
- Occupation: Actress

Matilde Lojacono (born 2 September 1989), known professionally as Matilde Gioli, is an Italian television and film actress.

== Life and career ==
Born in Milan to a father from Apulia and a mother from Tuscany, from whom she decided to take the surname for her artistic career, Matilde Gioli graduated in Philosophy from the University of Milan. With no previous acting experiences, she became known to the public for her role of Serena Ossola in Paolo Virzì's Human Capital, and for her performance she won the Guglielmo Biraghi Award at the 69th Silver Ribbon Awards. She also won the Alida Valli Award during the Bari International Film Festival and was nominated for the Ciak d'oro for Best Supporting Actress.

== Filmography ==
=== Film ===
Year	Title	Role	Notes
2013	Human Capital	Serena Ossola	
2015	Solo per il weekend	Melissa	
2015	Belli di papà	Chiara Liuzzi	
2015	Un posto sicuro	Raffaella	
2016	Claustrophonia		Short film
2016	2night	Lei	
2016	Radice di 9	Greta	Short film
2017	Mom or Dad?	Matilde	
2017	Alice non lo sa	Barbara	
2017	The Startup: Accendi il tuo futuro	Cecilia	
2017	The Family House	Fanny	
2017	Blue Kids	V	
2018	Dreamfools	Letizia	
2018	Cronache aliene		Short film
2018	The King's Musketeers	Olimpia	
2019	Una tradizione di famiglia	Giulia	
2019	Golden Men	Anna	
2020	È per il tuo bene	Valentina	
2021	Va bene così	Paola	
2021	Futura	Valentina	
2022	Four to Dinner	Giulia	
2022	Bla Bla Baby	Silvia	
2023	Needing a Friend?	Maya	
2026	No Place to Be Single	Elisa	

=== Television ===
Year	Title	Role	Notes	Ref.
2014	Gomorrah	Perla Musi	Episode: "Il ruggito della leonessa"	
2016	Untraditional		Episode: "I rigori nell'armadio"	
2017	Di padre in figlia	Elena Franza	4 episodes	
2020-22	DOC - Nelle tue mani	Giulia Giordano	Main cast, 32 episodes	
2023	Fernanda	Fernanda Wittgens	TV movie	
2025	Blanca	Eva Faraldi	6 episodes	
2026	Chiaroscuro	Leda	8 episodes	
