= It May Be Love But It Doesn't Show =

2011 film

It May Be Love But It Doesn't Show -Anche se è amore non si vede-
- Directed by: Ficarra e Picone
- Written by: Ficarra e Picone; Francesco Bruni
- Produced by: Attilio De Razza
- Starring: Ficarra e Picone; Ambra Angiolini; Sal Borgese
- Music by: Paolo Buonvino
- Release date: November 23, 2011
- Running time: 96 min
- Country: Italy
- Language: Italian

It May Be Love But It Doesn't Show (Italian: Anche se è amore non si vede) is a 2011 Italian comedy film written, directed and starred by the comedy duo Ficarra e Picone. It is their first film in which the setting is not Sicilian.

The film was a box office success, grossing over 6 million euros.

== Plot summary ==
Salvo and Valentino are two Sicilian friends who have moved to Turin, and now run a small business together. They drive foreign tourists around in a double-decker bus, and Salvo always tries to approach the pretty girls. On the other hand, Valentino is a faithful boyfriend but continually pesters his girl Gisella with over-the-top sentimental gestures and gifts. Finally, Gisella becomes totally annoyed and decides to leave him. Since she lacks the courage to tell Valentino herself, she asks Salvo to tell Valentino before she comes back from a work trip.

Salvo, having discovered that his latest tour guide Natasha loves all things African, starts sporting African paraphernalia to impress her. His hopes are buoyed when Natasha tells him that she hasn't heard from her wonderful boyfriend Arturo.

In the meantime, their old friend Sonia arrives in Turin with her American boyfriend Peter. Sonia confides to Valentino that she's about to break up with Peter and has realized that she loves Salvo. Things start to get complicated when Valentino and Natasha turn to each other for comfort from their respective breakups. Gisella observes them dancing up a storm, feels jealous, and starts to regret having broken up with Valentino.

Things come to a head at the wedding of Orazio, another member of the curling team Salvo and Valentino belong to. Misunderstandings abound, stoked by rapidly escalating gossip about Gisella and Salvo. Natasha shows up and discovers "Arturo" is the groom Orazio, and she and the bride thrash him together. In the middle of the tumult, Valentino and Gisella get back together and Salvo and Sonia find love.

== Cast ==
- Salvatore Ficarra as Salvo
- Valentino Picone as Valentino
- Ambra Angiolini as Gisella
- Diane Fleri as Sonia
- Sascha Zacharias as Natasha
- David Furr as Peter
- Giovanni Esposito as Orazio/Arturo
- Sal Borgese as Orazio's Father
- Rossella Leone as Angela
- Antonio Rucco as Angela's Father
- Clelia Piscitello as Angela's Mother
- Thierno Thiam as the Tattooist

== See also ==
- List of Italian films of 2011
