= La matassa =

- Directed by: Giambattista Avellino and Ficarra e Picone
- Written by: Ficarra e Picone; Fabrizio Testini
- Produced by: Attilio De Razza
- Starring: Ficarra e Picone
- Cinematography: Roberto Forza
- Music by: Paolo Buonvino
- Release date: 2009
- Running time: 95 min
- Country: Italy
- Language: Italian

La matassa ("The skein") is a 2009 Italian comedy film written and directed by Giambattista Avellino and by Ficarra e Picone. The film was a box office success, ranking first for two weeks at the Italian box office and grossing $10,007,765.

== Plot summary ==
The movie opens with Paolo (Picone), the owner of Albergo Geraci, standing on the roof and seeming like he's about to jump off as the firefighters and the local priest try to convince him to come down. A mysterious man (Claudio Gioè) climbs on a balcony and reveals he has to show him something important. He mentions that one of the papers is real and the others are what [Paolo's] cousin gave him.

Meanwhile, Gaetano (Ficarra), Paolo's cousin, rushes to the hotel to save his cousin. He sees the mysterious man, who taunts him, and seems perturbed. He walks in and Paolo tells him off.

They start fighting over the hotel's ownership, which had caused their father's fight thirty years before, after which Paolo and Gaetano hadn't seen each other until the funeral of Paolo's father, Gaetano's uncle.

The local priest starts narrating the events that took place in the last month.

Paolo, a weak and anxious man, is grieving his father's recent death while dealing with his hypochondria, while Gaetano owns an illegal marriage agency, which sets up immigrant women to marry Italian men so they have easy access to Italian and EU citizenships, thanks to the ius sanguinis principle.

He gets all his info about the men's health through his friend, the mysterious man who gave Paolo the real documents at the beginning of the movie, who works at a healthcare blood test centre, and he himself married an East-European woman, Olga (Anna Safroncik), who dislikes him and finds him idiotic, so much that she tells everyone they're only partners at work and is filing for divorce.

He's having trouble with a couple of Russian men, the Karamazov. He promised he'd marry off the woman they're protecting but has not been able to yet. Finally, he's found an old man, who wants to get married in a church because of his mother's wish.

Unfortunately for Paolo, the churches where the wedding and the funeral are taking place are close and through a series of misunderstandings, Gaetano stumbles in Paolo's father's funeral and gets applauded, as everyone thinks he wants to smooth things over in the family. Once he gets to the wedding, the groom leaves in an ambulance because his mother is going to the hospital. The Karamazov go after Gaetano, who pretends to want to help Paolo grieve so he can get away and get to the hotel.

Once he's there, he remembers his childhood when he played his cousin, as their fathers were also good friends. Then, when the fight broke out, Gaetano's father dragged him out and never went back, claiming Paolo's father stole the hotel from him.

After the funeral, Paolo finds out his father was having problems with the Camorra, which helped pay rent by sending loans that need to be paid back. He plans on selling the hotel, but Gaetano stops him because he finds out if the ever-so-anxious Paolo were to die, he'd leave Gaetano ownership of the hotel, which he still thinks Paolo's father stole from his side of the family.

He takes Paolo to get a blood test and then swaps the real results with the fake ones of an old, diabetic man. It's after being told he only has weeks to live that Paolo becomes a daredevil, tried out bungee-jumping and asks out the woman he loves and, out of euphoria, punches and kicks the Camorra man who's come for the loan. He then runs over to the police station and ordeals a plan to capture the Camorra bosses who loaned him the money.

Naturally, this puts both of them in a tight spot. The Camorra men threaten Gaetano to tell Paolo to pay in three days time, otherwise, they'll kill Gaetano, since they also think Paolo is dying.

Paolo gives Gaetano ownership of the hotel because he thinks he'll make the most of it, but Gaetano tries to sell it to get the money for the Camorra. He changes his mind when he remembers how they used to be best friends, and that's when he gets the call that Paolo is planning to kill himself. It turns out the mysterious man wanted half of the share, but Gaetano had already changed his mind, so the man revealed the scam.

Paolo is understandably upset and refuses to help Gaetano get the money for the Camorra. He leaves and talks to the man they both tried to sell the hotel to and he remembers their childhood together. He goes back and makes up with Gaetano.

However, now they're both in trouble with the Camorra. Gaetano owes them Paolo's money and Paolo ratted them out to the police. They try to meet up with three Camorra bosses and discuss a solution, but it's no use.

So now they both have to take part in the plot to arrest the Camorra boss that Paolo planned with the police, but all goes haywire and they end up getting chased by the Camorra men and the Karamazovs.

Paolo manages to call the police and set up an ambush where the Camorra men get arrested, but Gaetano still has to hold his end of the bargain and marries the Russian woman, since his wife has divorced him and taken control of the illegal marriage agency in the meantime.

In the end, Paolo and Gaetano are friends again and they both run the hotel together and they sit down to play cards as their fathers used to do thirty years ago.

== Cast ==
- Ficarra: Gaetano
- Picone: Paolo
- Anna Safroncik: Olga
- Claudio Gioè: Antonio
- Domenico Centamore: Ignazio
- Pino Caruso: Don Gino
- Tuccio Musumeci: Totò
- Mario Pupella: Don Mimí
- Mariella Lo Giudice: Paolo's Mother
- Rosa Pianeta: Gaetano's Mother
- Giovanni Martorana: Pietro
- Gino Astorina: Police Commissioner
