= Il Pirata: Marco Pantani =

- Written by: Claudio Bonivento; Nicola Lusuardi; Roberto Jannone
- Directed by: Claudio Bonivento
- Starring: Rolando Ravello
- Composers: Giancarlo Bigazzi; Marco Falagiani
- Original language: Italian

Production
- Cinematography: Emilio Loffredo
- Editor: Antonio Siciliano
- Running time: 100 min.

Original release
- Network: Rai 1
- Release: 2007

Il Pirata: Marco Pantani is a 2007 Italian television film written and directed by Claudio Bonivento.

The film is loosely based on the book Pantani: eroe tragico by Pier Bergonzi, Davide Cassani and Ivan Zazzaroni and it depicts real life events of road racing cyclist Marco Pantani.

== Cast ==
- Rolando Ravello as Marco Pantani, aka Il Pirata
- Nicoletta Romanoff as Christina
- Ivano Marescotti as Beltrame
- Gianfelice Facchetti as Francesco
- Franco Mescolini as Grandpa Sotero
- Solveig D'Assunta as Marco's mother
- Maurizio Tafani as Marco's father
- Massimiliano Franciosa as Giordano
- Marco Rossi as Pantani as a child
- Omero Antonutti as Ridolfi
- Gianni Minà as Himself
- Felice Gimondi as Himself
