= Rolando Ravello =

Italian actor, director, and screenwriter (born 1969)

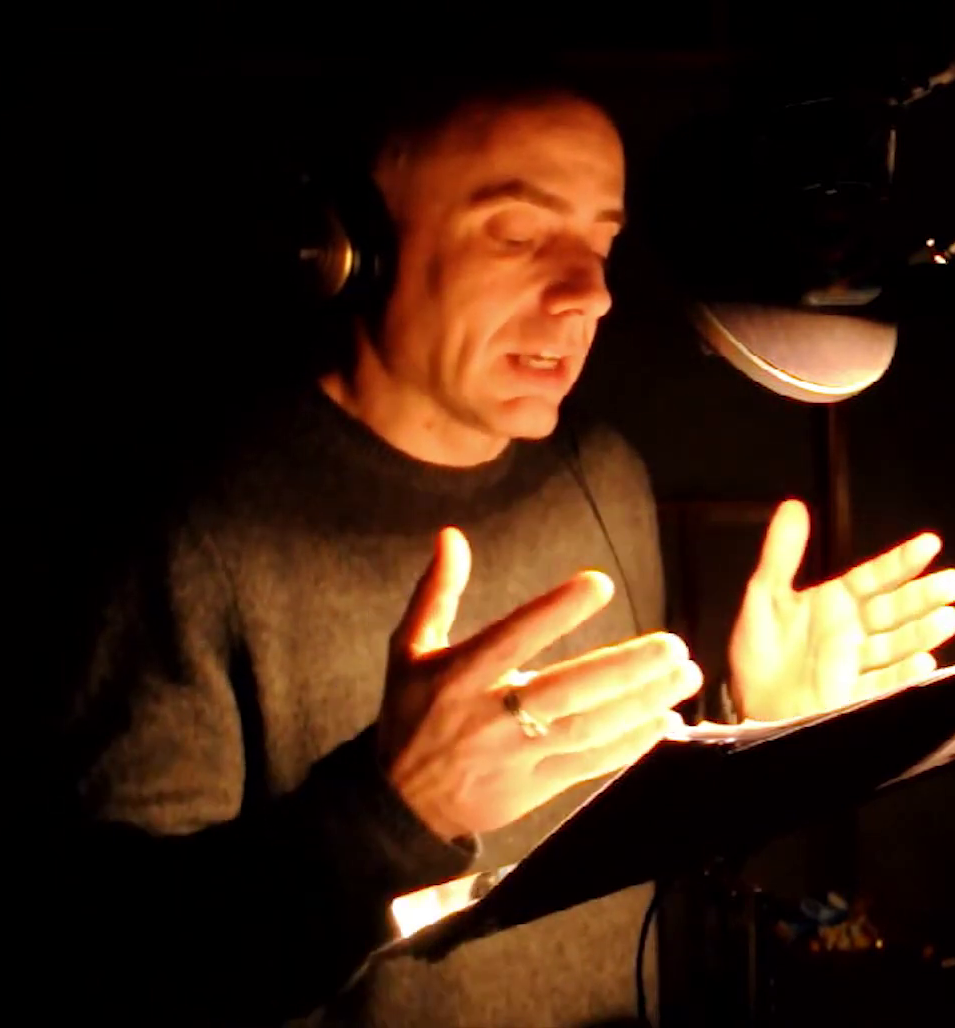
- Born: 4 June 1969 (age 57); Rome, Italy
- Occupations: Actor, director
- Years active: 1988-present
- Height: 1.70 m (5 ft 7 in)

Rolando Ravello (born 4 June 1969) is an Italian actor, director and screenwriter.

== Life and career ==
Born in Rome, at young age Ravello founded a comedy ensemble with Manuela Morabito e Renato Giordano, and in 1988 the trio co-hosted the RAI children variety show Big. Later, he attended some acting courses and performed in several small theaters in his hometown. Ravello had his breakout in 1995, with the main role of Vincenzo in Ettore Scola's Romanzo di un giovane povero. Also active on television, in 2001 he made his directorial debut with the short film La Colla. His 2013 film Tutti contro tutti was nominated for Nastro d'Argento for best comedy film.

== Selected filmography ==
- Romanzo di un giovane povero (1995)
- Viol@ (1998)
- The Dinner (1998)
- Almost Blue (2000)
- Unfair Competition (2001)
- The Good Pope: Pope John XXIII (2003)
- Inferno Below (2003)
- City Limits (2004)
- Il Pirata: Marco Pantani (2007)
- Lessons in Chocolate (2007)
- Balancing Act (2012)
- Diaz – Don't Clean Up This Blood (2012)
- Ever Been to the Moon? (2015)
- C'era una volta il crimine (2022)
- Rumours (2024)

=== Director ===
- Tutti contro tutti (2013)
- Do You Remember Me? (2014)
- La Prima Pietra (2018)
