= Nicoletta Romanoff =

Italian television and film actress

- Born: Nicoletta Consolo; 14 May 1979 (age 47); Rome, Italy
- Occupation: Actress
- Years active: 2003–present
- Spouses: Federico Scardamaglia (m. 1999; div. 2004) Federico Alverà (m. 2019)
- Children: Francesco Scardamaglia; Gabriele Scardamaglia; Maria Pasotti; Anna Alverà
- Parent(s): Giuseppe Consolo; Princess Natalija Nikolaevna Romanov

Nicoletta Romanoff (born Nicoletta Consolo, 14 May 1979) is an Italian television and film actress.

== Acting career ==
Romanoff made her cinematic debut in the 2003 Italian film Remember Me, My Love, directed by Gabriele Muccino. She played the role of Valentina, a teenage girl aggressively pursuing dreams of show business fame. As a film critic described her performance, "Ms. Romanoff, who more or less steals the movie, is completely believable as an Italian post-Britney material girl who is all drive and no modesty." Another critic described Valentina's pivotal role in sustaining the film's tone: "There are occasional flashes of the sardonic tone which promised so much at the start - mostly when the focus is on Valentina's more extreme acts of narcissism. Then Muccino seems to forget how appalling she is and starts applauding these egocentricities as signs of her unquenchable spirit." (translated)

Romanoff has also played lead roles in the 2007 comedy film Cardiofitness and the 2010 film Dalla vita in poi.

== Personal ==
Romanoff is the daughter of an Italian politician, Giuseppe Consolo and his wife, Princess Natalija Nikolaevna Romanov, from whom she gets her stage name. (Romanoff is a variant romanization of the Russian surname Romanov.) Her maternal grandfather is Nicholas Romanov, Prince of Russia, which makes her a great-great-great-great-granddaughter of Emperor Nicholas I of Russia. Romanoff married in 1999 and had two sons before the marriage ended. She then began a long-term relationship with Italian actor Giorgio Pasotti, with whom she had a daughter. Romanoff is now married to Federico Alverà; they have a daughter together.

In 2016, she collaborated with Damiani and created The Romanov Collection of jewellery. This collection is inspired by treasures of the Russian imperial dynasty.

== Filmography ==
=== Cinema ===
Year	Film	Role	Other notes
2003	Remember Me, My Love	Valentina	Directed by Gabriele Muccino
2007	Cardiofitness	Stefania	Directed by Fabio Tagliavia
2010	From the Life and Onward	Rosalba	Directed by Gianfrancesco Lazotti
2012	A flat for three	Lorenza	Directed by Carlo Verdone
2015	Crushed Lives - Il sesso dopo i figli		Directed by Alessandro Colizzi
2017	La casa di famiglia	Masha	Directed by Augusto Fornari
2020	Gli anni più belli	Margherita Angelucci	Directed by Gabriele Muccino

=== Television ===
Year	Film	Role	Other notes
2005	Un anno a primavera	Angela	
2007	Il Pirata – Marco Pantani	Cristina	
