= Ficarra e Picone =

Italian comedy duo

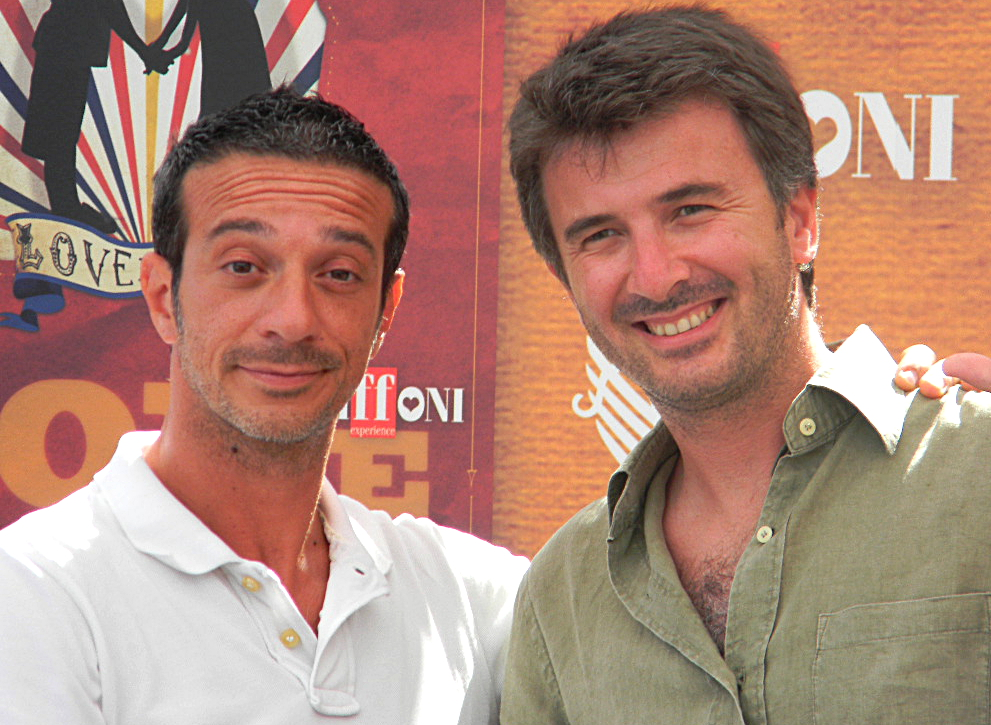
Salvo Ficarra and Valentino Picone at the 2010 Giffoni Film Festival

Salvatore Ficarra (born 27 May 1971, in Palermo) and Valentino Picone (born 23 March 1971, in Palermo) are an Italian comedy duo who work on stage, films, television and books as Ficarra e Picone.

== Life and career ==
They started in 1993 along with Salvatore Borrello as a comedy trio, performing together on stage as "Chiamata Urbana Urgente".

In 1998, the two remaining members began to use their surnames: Ficarra & Picone.

In 2000, Ficarra e Picone made their film debut with Ask Me If I'm Happy by Aldo, Giovanni & Giacomo, and two years later they made the first film as main actors, Nati stanchi.

On 25 April 2005, Ficarra and Picone were the hosts for the satirical television program Striscia la notizia ("The News Slither") for four episodes; they continued the collaboration intermittently from 27 March 2006 up to 5 December 2020.

In 2007 they debuted as directors alongside Gianbattista Avellino with the film Il 7 e l'8, for which they were nominated to David di Donatello for Best New Director and to Silver Ribbon in the same category.

Also in 2007 they were featured as comic characters in the story Zio Paperone e il rapimento teatrale (trad. Uncle Scrooge and the Theatrical Kidnapping), published in the issue 2678 of Topolino.

== Filmography ==
=== Film ===
- Nati stanchi (2002)
- Il 7 e l'8 (2007)
- La matassa (2009)
- Baarìa (2009)
- Women vs. Men (2011)
- It May Be Love But It Doesn't Show (2011)
- Belluscone: A Sicilian Story (2014)
- Andiamo a quel paese (2014)
- It's the Law (2017)
- Once Upon a Time... in Bethlehem (2019)
- Strangeness (2022)
- Santocielo (2023)
- The Illusion (2025)

=== TV series ===
- Framed! A Sicilian Murder Mystery (2022-2023)
- Sicily Express (2025)

== Bibliography ==
- 2003 – Vuoti a perdere, Kowalsky editore
- 2004 – Stanchi, Kowalsky editore
- 2005 – Diciamoci la verità, Mondadori
- 2007 – Sono cose che capitano, Mondadori

== Awards ==
- 2007 – Premio Charlot – Striscia la notizia
- 2007 – Capri Exploit Award
- 2009 – Premio Barocco
