= Zero Comico =

2001 adventure video game

- Developers: GMM Entertainment; Oogo S.r.l.
- Publishers: Medusa Games; Oogo S.r.l.
- Platform: Windows
- Release: WW: November 7, 2001
- Genre: Graphic Adventure
- Mode: Single-player

Zero Comico is an Italian video game published in 2001 and dedicated to the characters of Aldo, Giovanni and Giacomo, with numerous references to their shows and parodies of other video games. It is distributed by Medusa Games, part of Medusa Film, distributor of the trio's films. In the game Aldo, Giovanni and Giacomo are voiced by themselves. The game is imbued with the comedy of the trio and also with some lines already used in theatrical performances.

The name "Zero Comico" (that literally translate as "Comedic Zero") derives from a line from the show of the trio I corti di Aldo, Giovanni & Giacomo, in which the "Zero Comico", understood philosophically as the simplest comic message possible, is represented by Tafazzi, a character played by Giacomo.

== Plot ==
The story takes place on Earth in the third millennium. A phantom technocratic regime established by the planetary federation forces the planet's population to live in bunker houses; the only contact with the outside world is television. In one of these bunker houses live Aldo, Giovanni and Giacomo; one day they are contacted through television by an individual (who looks like Tafazzi) who communicates to the three that they are the people who will have to destroy Pdor (a character played by Giovanni in one of the trio's theatrical shows, Tel chi el telùn), the head of the regime, and bring happiness back to the whole planet. Upon entering the realm of Pdor, he explains that they will have to go through five levels in the world of video games and other kinds of popular references, and upon completion of each of these levels a piece of the device will be delivered that will restore happiness to the whole planet, thus defeating Pdor.

Eventually the three reassemble the device; but when Pdor refuses to admit defeat, Aldo destroys the system by insulting Pdor heavily. The three, however, remain incredulous when they discover that the device that will restore happiness to the whole planet is only a hologram of Tafazzi in his most famous sketch.

== Gameplay ==
The player controls one character at a time. The first three levels are played entirely with one character each (the others, except in a few cutscenes, remain in one room as non-playing characters), while in the last two levels the characters "share" the various corridors, "giving the change" and passing the inventory items. The character is controlled with the directional keys, he can walk or run, collect objects, combine them with each other and use them with elements of the scenario or other characters. Being a graphic adventure, the game is focused on solving puzzles, and the characters have no energy statistics or keystrokes of combat, even if this does not mean that the protagonists never commit violent actions. It is possible at any time to choose between three different types of view: as if there were cameras positioned high along the walls, or in first person view or with a third person view, from behind the back.

== Development ==
The game is made in polygonal 3D graphics, which is also used during short interludes within the levels. The initial, final and intermission films between the various levels are prerendered. Not all dialogues are dubbed, but only those of prerendered interludes and cutscenes, while the others appear only in text format. The character design was curated by Andrea Cuneo.
