= Cattleya (production company) =

Italian film production company

Cattleya S.r.l.
- Type: Subsidiary
- Industry: Entertainment
- Founded: 1997; 29 years ago
- Founder: Riccardo Tozzi
- Headquarters: Rome, Italy
- Key people: Riccardo Tozzi (CEO); Giovanni Stabilini (president, CEO); Marco Chimenz (CEO)
- Products: Films; Television series
- Parent: ITV Studios (2017–present)
- Website: cattleya.it

Cattleya S.r.l. is an Italian film and television production company founded by Riccardo Tozzi.

== History ==
Cattleya was founded by Riccardo Tozzi in 1997, with Giovanni Stabilini and Marco Chimenz as co-CEOs. Francesca Longardi joined as a partner in 1999 and Gina Gardini joined in 2005. In October 2017, British production and distribution outfit ITV Studios acquired a majority stake in the company. In 2023, Chimenz stepped down as co-CEO.

== Filmography ==
=== Film ===
Year	Title	Director	Ref.
1998	Marriages	Cristina Comencini	
1999	Tea with Mussolini	Franco Zeffirelli	
2000	Free the Fish	Cristina Comencini	
2001	Se fossi in te	Giulio Manfredonia	
2001	How Harry Became a Tree	Goran Paskaljević	
2001	Hotel	Mike Figgis	
2001	Our Tropical Island	Marcello Cesena	
2002	The Best Day of My Life	Cristina Comencini	
2002	Ripley's Game	Liliana Cavani	
2002	A Journey Called Love	Michele Placido	
2002	Callas Forever	Franco Zeffirelli	
2002	El Alamein: The Line of Fire	Enzo Monteleone	
2003	I'm Not Scared	Gabriele Salvatores	
2003	Caterina in the Big City	Paolo Virzì	
2004	Stork Day	Giulio Manfredonia	
2004	Don't Move	Sergio Castellitto	
2004	Three Steps Over Heaven	Luca Lucini	
2004	Ovunque sei	Michele Placido	
2004	Eyes of Crystal	Eros Puglielli	
2005	Live and Become	Radu Mihăileanu	
2005	L'uomo perfetto	Luca Lucini	
2005	Once You're Born You Can No Longer Hide	Marco Tullio Giordana	
2005	Don't Tell	Cristina Comencini	
2005	The Method	Marcelo Piñeyro	
2005	Romanzo Criminale	Michele Placido	
2006	L'estate del mio primo bacio	Carlo Virzì	
2006	Mare nero	Roberta Torre	
2006	The Missing Star	Gianni Amelio	
2006	Napoleon and Me	Paolo Virzì	
2006	Commediasexi	Alessandro D'Alatri	
2007	Ho voglia di te	Luis Prieto	
2007	Flying Lessons	Francesca Archibugi	
2007	My Brother Is an Only Child	Daniele Luchetti	
2007	Lessons in Chocolate	Claudio Cupellini	
2008	Black and White	Cristina Comencini	
2008	Parlami d'amore	Silvio Muccino	
2008	At a Glance	Sergio Rubini	
2008	Love, Soccer and Other Catastrophes	Luca Lucini	
2008	Solo un padre	Luca Lucini	
2009	Iago	Volfango De Biasi	
2009	The Ladies Get Their Say	Enzo Monteleone	
2009	Different from Whom?	Umberto Carteni	
2009	A Question of the Heart	Francesca Archibugi	
2009	The Red Shadows	Francesco Maselli	
2009	Oggi sposi	Luca Lucini	
2009	Meno male che ci sei	Luis Prieto	
2009	Nine	Rob Marshall	
2010	La nostra vita	Daniele Luchetti	
2010	Benvenuti al Sud	Luca Miniero	
2010	The Woman of My Dreams	Luca Lucini	
2010	Three Steps Above Heaven	Fernando González Molina	
2010	Un altro mondo	Silvio Muccino	
2011	Some Say No	Giambattista Avellino	
2011	Terraferma	Emanuele Crialese	
2011	When the Night	Cristina Comencini	
2011	The First Man	Gianni Amelio	
2011	Lezioni di cioccolato 2	Alessio Maria Federici	
2012	Benvenuti al Nord	Luca Miniero	
2012	ACAB – All Cops Are Bastards	Stefano Sollima	
2012	Piazza Fontana: The Italian Conspiracy	Marco Tullio Giordana	
2012	Dormant Beauty	Marco Bellocchio	
2012	Cosimo e Nicole	Francesco Amato	
2013	The Unlikely Prince	Alessandro Siani	
2013	Siberian Education	Gabriele Salvatores	
2013	Those Happy Years	Daniele Luchetti	
2013	Stay Away from Me	Alessio Maria Federici	
2014	A Boss in the Living Room	Luca Miniero	
2014	L'Ex de ma vie	Dorothée Sebbagh	
2014	The Face of an Angel	Michael Winterbottom	
2014	La scuola più bella del mondo	Luca Miniero	
2015	Si accettano miracoli	Alessandro Siani	
2015	Torno indietro e cambio vita	Carlo Vanzina	
2015	Suburra	Stefano Sollima	
2016	Un paese quasi perfetto	Massimo Gaudioso	
2016	Troppo napoletano	Gianluca Ansanelli	
2016	Something New	Cristina Comencini	
2016	Non c'è più religione	Luca Miniero	
2017	Mr. Happiness	Alessandro Siani	
2017	Let Yourself Go	Francesco Amato	
2017	Addio fottuti musi verdi	Francesco Ebbasta	
2018	Io sono Tempesta	Daniele Luchetti	
2018	La fuitina sbagliata	Mimmo Esposito	
2019	The Immortal	Marco D'Amore	
2020	In vacanza su Marte	Neri Parenti	
2022	Four to Dinner	Alessio Maria Federici	
2022	The Hanging Sun	Francesco Carrozzini	
2023	Born for You	Fabio Mollo	
2024	Cassino in Ischia	Frank Ciota	
2025	Three Goodbyes	Isabel Coixet	
2025	The Big Fake	Stefano Lodovichi	
2026	Il dio dell'amore	Francesco Lagi	
TBA	Iside	Maria Sole Tognazzi	

=== Television ===
Year	Title	Network	Ref.
2006	Codice rosso	Canale 5	
2008–2010	Romanzo criminale – La serie	Sky Cinema	
2011–2013	Rossella	Rai 1	
2014–2021	Gomorrah	Sky Atlantic	
2015–2018	Tutto può succedere	Rai 1	
2017–2020	Suburra: Blood on Rome	Netflix	
2018–present	Carlo & Malik	Rai 1	
2019–2020	ZeroZeroZero	Sky Atlantic	
2020	Bella da morire	Rai 1	
2020–2022	Summertime	Netflix	
2020–present	Petra	Sky Atlantic	
2020–present	Romulus	Sky Atlantic	
2021	We Children From Bahnhof Zoo	Amazon Prime Video	
2021–present	Masantonio	Canale 5	
2021	Generation 56K	Netflix	
2022–present	Noi	Rai 1	
2022	Circeo	Rai 1	
2022–present	Django	Sky Atlantic	
2023–present	Suburræterna	Netflix	
2024	My Love	Sky Serie	
2024	Deceitful Love	Netflix	
2024–present	Citadel: Diana	Amazon Prime Video	
2025	Public Disorder	Netflix	
2025	Gerri	Rai 1	
2026	Gomorrah: The Origins	Sky Atlantic	
2026	In Utero	HBO Max	
TBA	Untitled TV series on the White Uno Gang		
TBA	SuburraMaxima	Netflix	
