= List of Italian films of 2008 =

A list of films produced in Italy in 2008 (see 2008 in film):

Title	Director	Cast	Genre	Notes
2008
L'allenatore nel pallone 2	Sergio Martino	Lino Banfi, Anna Falchi	Comedy	
Amore che vieni, amore che vai	Daniele Costantini	Fausto Paravidino, Filippo Nigro, Donatella Finocchiaro	crime-drama	
As God Commands	Gabriele Salvatores	Filippo Timi, Elio Germano	drama	Entered into the 31st Moscow International Film Festival
BirdWatchers	Marco Bechis	Chiara Caselli, Claudio Santamaria	drama	
Black and White	Cristina Comencini	Fabio Volo, Ambra Angiolini, Aïssa Maïga	romance	
Blood of the Losers	Michele Soavi	Michele Placido, Barbora Bobuľová, Alessandro Preziosi, Philippe Leroy, Giovanna Ralli	war-drama	
Carnera - The Walking Mountain	Renzo Martinelli	Anna Valle, Paul Sorvino, F. Murray Abraham, Burt Young	Biography	
The Demons of St. Petersberg	Giuliano Montaldo	Miki Manojlović, Carolina Crescentini, Anita Caprioli	Drama	
Il Divo	Paolo Sorrentino	Toni Servillo, Piera Degli Esposti, Anna Bonaiuto, Flavio Bucci	Biography	The story of Italian Prime Minister Giulio Andreotti. Golden Palm nomination. Prix du Jury at the Cannes Film Festival.
Galantuomini	Edoardo Winspeare	Donatella Finocchiaro, Fabrizio Gifuni	Crime-drama	
A Game for Girls	Matteo Rovere	Filippo Nigro	drama	
Un giorno perfetto	Ferzan Özpetek	Isabella Ferrari, Valerio Mastandrea, Nicole Grimaudo	drama	
Giovanna's Father	Pupi Avati		Drama	
Gomorrah	Matteo Garrone	Toni Servillo, Maria Nazionale	Mafia	Golden Palm nomination. Grand Prix at the Cannes Film Festival.
Lecture 21	Alessandro Baricco	John Hurt, Noah Taylor, Leonor Watling	Drama	
The Man Who Loves	Maria Sole Tognazzi	Pierfrancesco Favino, Kseniya Rappoport, Monica Bellucci	Romance Drama	
Mid-August Lunch	Gianni Di Gregorio	Gianni Di Gregorio, Valeria De Franciscis	Comedy	Produced by Matteo Garrone.
Natale a Rio	Neri Parenti	Christian De Sica, Michelle Hunziker, Massimo Ghini	Comedy	
Parlami d'amore	Silvio Muccino	Silvio Muccino, Aitana Sánchez-Gijón, Carolina Crescentini, Geraldine Chaplin	Romance	
The Past Is a Foreign Land	Daniele Vicari	Elio Germano, Michele Riondino, Chiara Caselli, Valentina Lodovini	Crime-drama	
Quiet Chaos (Caos calmo)	Antonello Grimaldi	Nanni Moretti, Valeria Golino, Alessandro Gassman	Drama	Golden Bear nomination.
Il resto della notte	Francesco Munzi	Sandra Ceccarelli, Valentina Cervi	Drama	Premiered at Quinzaine des Réalisateurs at Cannes film festival.
Sandrine in the Rain	Tonino Zangardi	Sara Forestier, Adriano Giannini	Thriller	
Scusa ma ti chiamo amore	Federico Moccia	Raoul Bova, Michela Quattrociocche	Romantic comedy	
La seconda volta non si scorda mai	Francesco Ranieri Martinotti	Alessandro Siani, Elisabetta Canalis	Comedy	
Il seme della discordia	Pappi Corsicato	Caterina Murino, Alessandro Gassman, Martina Stella	Comedy mystery	Nominated for Golden Lion.
This Night Is Still Ours	Genovese & Miniero	Nicolas Vaporidis, Ilaria Spada	comedy	
Torno a vivere da solo	Jerry Calà	Jerry Calà, Don Johnson	Comedy	
Tutta la vita davanti	Paolo Virzì	Elio Germano, Sabrina Ferilli, Valerio Mastandrea	Comedy-drama	
We Can Do That	Giulio Manfredonia	Claudio Bisio, Anita Caprioli	comedy-drama	
Wild Blood	Marco Tullio Giordana	Monica Bellucci, Luca Zingaretti, Alessio Boni	History	About Luisa Ferida and Osvaldo Valenti.
