= Serena Autieri =

Italian singer and actress

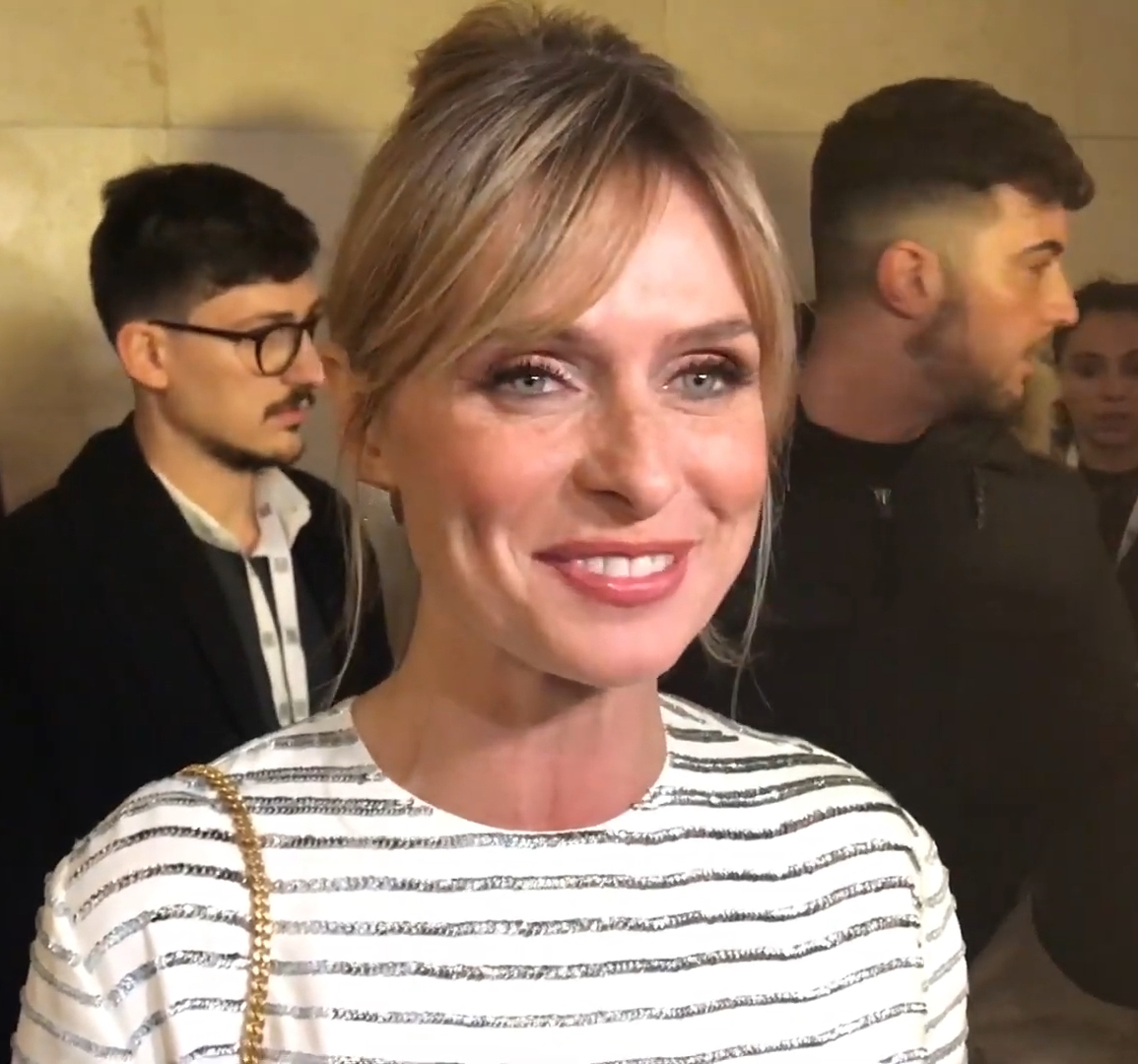
- Autieri in 2019
- Born: 4 April 1976 (age 50); Naples, Italy
- Occupations: Actress; singer; television personality

Serena Autieri (born 4 April 1976) is an Italian actress and singer.

== Career ==
Serena Autieri was born in Naples, Campania. As a child she studied ballet, singing, and acting.

On 14 April 2003, she released her album CD Anima Soul. Her television debut was in 1998 on the soap opera Un posto al sole broadcast by RAI Tre. Autieri made her first appearance on the stage in 2002 in the musical Bulli e pupe. The following year, in 2003, she was co-host for the 52nd edition of the nationally televised Sanremo Music Festival alongside presenter Pippo Baudo and actress Claudia Gerini. In 2004, she had her first starring role in a major picture with Sara May, which was directed by Marianna Sciveres.

Autieri has had roles in several soap operas and television mini-series. These include La maledizione dei templari ("The Curse of the Templars"), in which she portrayed Clemence of Hungary, and L'onore e il rispetto ("Honor and Respect"), where she played the part of Olga.

In 2012, she won the first series of Tale e quale show on Rai 1, the Italian adaptation of Your Face Sounds Familiar.

In 2013, Serena supplied the talking and singing parts for Elsa, the Snow Queen in the Italian dub of the Disney Animation, Frozen, (Italian: "Frozen - Il Regno di Ghiaccio", meaning "Frozen - The Kingdom of Ice"). She took up the role again for the sequel Frozen 2.

Autieri occasionally appears in television commercials.

== Discography ==
- Anima Soul (2003, album CD)

== Theatre ==
- Bulli e pupe (2002)
- Vacanze Romane (2003/2004-05)
- Shakespeare in Jazz (2006)
- Facce da teatro (2007)
- A Midsummer Night's Dream (2008)
- Shakespeare in Jazz (2009)

== Filmography ==
=== Films ===
Film roles showing year released, title, role played, director and notes
Year	Title	Role	Director	Notes
2004	Sara May	Sara May	Marianna Sciveres	Feature film debut
2007	Notte prima degli esami – Oggi	Elisabetta Paliani	Fausto Brizzi	
2009	L'ultimo crodino	Patrizia	Umberto Spinazola	
2010	Natale in Sudafrica	Marta Boffa	Neri Parenti	
2011	Women vs. Men	Diana Mannetta	Fausto Brizzi	
2013	The Unlikely Prince	Jessica Quagliarulo	Alessandro Siani	
2013	Frozen	Elsa (voice)	Chris Buck, Jennifer Lee	Italian voice-over role
2013	Un fantastico via vai	Anita	Leonardo Pieraccioni	
2013	Niente può fermarci	Gilda	Luigi Cecinelli	
2014	Sapore di te	Susanna "Susy" Acampora	Carlo Vanzina	
2014	Walt Disney e l'Italia: Una storia d'amore	Narrator (voice)	Marco Spagnoli	Documentary film
2014	Ambo	Veronica	Pierluigi Di Lallo	
2015	Frozen Fever	Elsa (voice)	Chris Buck, Jennifer Lee	Short film
2015	Si accettano miracoli	Adele Canfora	Alessandro Siani	
2016	Se mi lasci non vale	Sara Luchini	Vincenzo Salemme	
2017	Olaf's Frozen Adventure	Elsa (voice)	Kevin Deters, Stevie Wermers	Italian voice-over role
2018	Ralph Breaks the Internet	Elsa (voice)	Rich Moore, Phil Johnston	Italian voice-over role
2019	Frozen II	Elsa (voice)	Chris Buck, Jennifer Lee	Italian voice-over role
2021	Con tutto il cuore	Clelia	Vincenzo Salemme	

=== Television ===
Television roles showing year released, title, role played, network and notes
Year	Title	Role	Network	Notes
1998–2000	Un posto al sole	Sara De Vito	Rai 3	Series regular (seasons 3–4)
2001	Stranamore	Herself/co-host	Canale 5	Reality show (season 6)
2002–2004	Vento di ponente	Francesca Ghiglione	Rai 2	Lead role; 31 episodes
2003	Sanremo Music Festival 2003	Herself/co-host	Rai 1	Annual music festival
2003	Tutti i sogni del mondo	Cinzia Iannone	Rai 2	Miniseries
2004	2004 David di Donatello	Herself/co-host	Rai 1	Annual ceremony
2005	La maledizione dei Templari	Clémence de Hongrie	France 2	Miniseries
2005	Callas e Onassis	Tina Livanos	Canale 5	Miniseries
2006–2009	L'onore e il rispetto	Olga Miglio	Canale 5	Main role (seasons 1–2); 12 episodes
2007	La lance de la destinée	Vinciane	M6	Miniseries
2008	Agrodolce	Chiara Miele	Rai 3	Recurring role; 3 episodes
2008	Dottor Clown	Serena Laurenti	Canale 5	Television film
2009	Ice Fever	Odette	ZDF	Miniseries
2011	Attenti a quei due - La sfida	Herself/ Guest host	Rai 1	Variety/game show (season 1)
2011	Fratelli detective	Valentina	Canale 5	Main role; 12 episodes
2011	Dov'è mia figlia?	Sabrina Valle	Canale 5	Miniseries
2012	Tale e quale show	Herself/ Contestant	Rai 1	Winner (season 1)
2013	Capodanno in musica	Herself/ Host	Canale 5	Special
2014	Once Upon a Time	Elsa (voice)	ABC	Recurring role; 12 episodes
2016	Mia moglie, mia figlia e due bebè	Amalia Novelli	Rai 1	Television film
2017	Camera Café	Dr. Corte	Rai 2	Recurring role; 3 episodes
2018	Celebrity MasterChef Italia	Herself/ Contestant	Sky Uno	Cooking contest (season 2)
2018	Prodigi - La musica è vita	Herself/ Judge	Rai 1	Talent show (season 3)
2019	Prodigi - La musica è vita	Herself/ Host	Rai 1	Talent show (season 4)
2019	Un passo dal cielo	Ingrid Moser	Rai 1	Main role (season 5); 10 episodes
2021–present	Buongiorno, mamma!	Miriam Castellani	Canale 5	Main role; 6 episodes
2021–present	Dedicato	Herself/ Host	Rai 1	Talk show
