= Love, Soccer and Other Catastrophes =

2008 film

- Directed by: Luca Lucini
- Written by: Fabio Bonifacci; Luca Lucini
- Produced by: Giovanni Stabilini; Marco Chimenz; Riccardo Tozzi
- Starring: Claudio Bisio; Filippo Nigro; Claudia Pandolfi; Andrea De Rosa; Chiara Mastalli; Angela Finocchiaro
- Cinematography: Manfredo Archinto
- Edited by: Fabrizio Rossetti
- Music by: Giuliano Taviani
- Production company: Cattleya
- Distributed by: Warner Bros. Pictures
- Release date: 3 April 2008
- Running time: 112 minutes
- Country: Italy
- Language: Italian
- Box office: $2,222,029

Love, Soccer and Other Catastrophes (Italian: Amore, bugie e calcetto, lit. 'Love, Lies & Calcetto') is a 2008 Italian comedy film co-written and directed by Luca Lucini.

== Plot ==
Seven friends, every week, have an appointment that they cannot, and do not want to miss for any reason: their five-a-side football match, for which they leave family, work, meetings, university lessons. The team participates in an amateur tournament, the winners of which will play against the Old Boys, a team of former professional players.

The striker Vittorio Trebbi is a fifty-year-old divorced, owner of the Diana company, manufacturer of coffee machines and sponsor of the team; Adam, Vittorio's son, is the goalkeeper, who in life is a tattoo artist; Piero, an economics student and Adam's best friend, is in defense; Lele, chief worker in Diana, is the median; Filippo is specialized in going to him and provoking his opponents in order to knock them down or give them warnings; Mina, the captain, is a sports journalist former player of C, now fat and smoker, who enters the field only to beat the free-kicks ("He plays 3 minutes in the whole championship, but scores 20 goals. Mina confirms his average match : 6 cigarettes, 4 coffees, 1 goal and 2 packets of chips "); the Venezia is a worker in Diana, the bench par excellence.

The progress of the championship and the lives of the seven protagonists intertwine and influence each other. Vittorio is in negotiations for the sale of the company to a French group and is dating Viola, a twenty-two year old who juggles various occasional jobs: therefore, he has a forward mentality, vigorous and proactive; Adam was emotionally hurt by an ex-girlfriend of his and badly tolerates his father for cheating on Diana, his mother: he has therefore decided to live his life without initiative and in defense, so the goalkeeper is the perfect role; Piero organizes everything in his life, from the hours of study to those of the couple with Martina (Viola's friend): on the pitch he manages to organize his teammates, from whom he is called "Precisetti"; Lele, as a midfielder, is forced to run on the pitch, but also in life having to juggle work, sport and family life with his wife Silvia and two small children; Filippo manages to be hard-hearted both in the field and at work, often putting the gain in front of human relationships; Venezia has no particular quality, in fact in the game it is always on the bench; Mina is the captain and her role is to advise the team.

Vittorio tries to sell the company (whose name was clearly given in honor of his ex-wife when they were married) to a French group, but mysteriously the group withdraws the offer, the company is devalued enormously and goes into crisis. He also begins to struggle on the pitch, and one night has a tachycardic attack while in bed with Viola. Vittorio at the hospital meets Diana, a doctor on duty: she discovers a series of doping substances in his blood that were about to cause a heart attack. Threatening him to report, she orders him to detox by having her visit him every week. Adam, while bringing his father the change for the night, discovers that he is sleeping with Viola, his ex who broke his heart.

Martina discovers she is pregnant, but confesses to Viola that her father is Adam: suffocated by Piero's meticulous precision she had allowed herself a little leisure on March 8 and, thanks to alcohol and marijuana, she went to bed with him. When Piero accidentally discovers the fact (thinking he is the father) he asks Mina for advice and totally changes his attitude towards life, he takes more initiative and proposes to Martina to open a business of exchange and sale of all those objects for newborns of which after a certain age of the child, families no longer need.

Lele and Silvia experiment with various possible solutions to their married life, arriving at a disastrous dinner in which he puts marijuana in the vegetable pie that serves his wife and Silvia some Viagra in his broth: everything seems to be fine, when the daughter, left on purpose from his grandparents, he breaks his arm and they have to go to hospital in pitiful conditions. In the end, Lele also asks Mina for advice and finds a solution: since Silvia has given up her career as a restorer, she puts herself on leave at the company, becoming a housewife and making her wife work. She thus finds serenity with the job she studied for, and he manages to feel useful for his wife and family.

These upheavals are also reflected on the pitch: Piero and Vittorio switch roles, Adam is completely lost and Lele, after an initial phase of exhaustion, finds strength.

Vittorio talks to Adam and discovers that Diana is still in love with him: the weekly visits are just an excuse to be able to see him. Vittorio finally leaves Viola, to Adam's delight. The company is finally sold to the French, and Vittorio receives a visit from Piero, who asks him for a loan to start the business of buying and selling baby items: Vittorio accepts, as long as he swaps roles in the game with the Old Boys. Vittorio's new vigor leads him to score a goal.

Just after this game (disastrously lost) Vittorio discovers that it was Filippo who maneuvered the movements of the French to make the company devalue and buy it back at a lower price: after hitting him in the face, Vittorio chases Filippo from the team. Here Mina admits that she has always understood Filippo's nature for Nereo Rocco's law, "on the pitch as in life". He bitterly admits that he can only give advice to others and stay on the bench: he too is divorced and his ex-wife is remarrying.

Lele and Silvia rediscover the balance and she is pregnant again.

The new season begins: the new sponsor of the team is Piero's business, Vlad, a violent Serbian client of Adam's, has been taken in for Filippo, and Piero is convinced that he is a father.

== Cast ==
- Claudio Bisio as Vittorio
- Filippo Nigro as Lele
- Claudia Pandolfi as Silvia
- Giuseppe Battiston as Mina
- Chiara Mastalli as Viola
- Andrea De Rosa as Piero
- Pietro Sermonti as Filippo
- Angela Finocchiaro as Diana
- Andrea Bosca as Adam
- Max Mazzotta as Venezia
- Salvatore Schillaci as himself
- Stefano Tacconi as himself
- Moreno Mannini as himself
- Ruggiero Rizzitelli as himself
- Gigi Maifredi as himself

== See also ==
- List of Italian films of 2008
