= Sara Ciocca =

Italian actress (born 2008)

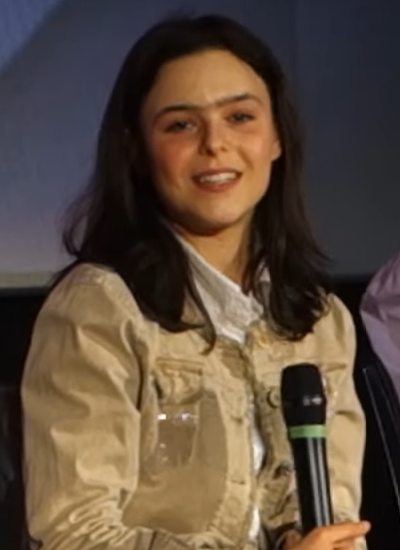
- Sara Ciocca in 2024
- Born: 30 January 2008 (age 18); Rome, Italy
- Occupations: Actress; voice actress
- Years active: 2018–present

Sara Ciocca (born 30 January 2008) is an Italian actress and voice actress.

== Life and career ==
Born in Rome to parents from Riccia, in Molise, she has been studying classical dance, modern jazz, contemporary dance, and piano since the age of three.

Her acting debut came in 2018 at the age of ten, when she played Alma in the television series The Miracle. In 2019, she made her film debut in The Most Beautiful Day in the World by Alessandro Siani. Later that year, Ciocca starred as Martina Muscarà in Ferzan Özpetek's The Goddess of Fortune.

Since 2021, she has starred as Lucia Ottonello in the Rai 1 series Blanca. Ciocca also took part with the role of Salmetta in Volfango De Biasi's Help! My In-Laws Are Vampires!, and its 2023 sequel.

In 2022, she starred in the thriller film I Am the Abyss by Donato Carrisi. That same year, she landed her first leading role in a feature film, starring alongside Diego Abatantuono in the Christmas comedy Improvvisamente Natale, playing the role of Chiara.

In 2023, Ciocca co-starred in Mimì: Prince of Darkness, Brando De Sica's directorial debut, and played the titular character in the fantasy thriller Nina of the Wolves, for which she received the Best New Young Actress Award at the 80th Venice International Film Festival.

Since 2024, she voices Niffty in the Hazbin Hotel Italian dub.

== Filmography ==
Film
Year	Title	Role	Notes
2018	Radici	Caroline	Short film
2019	The Most Beautiful Day in the World	Rebecca	Feature film debut
2019	The Goddess of Fortune	Martina Muscarà	
2020	Tutti per uno, uno per tutti	Ginevra	
2021	America Latina	Lucia	
2021	Help! My In-Laws Are Vampires!	Salmetta	
2021	Who Framed Santa Claus?	Rebecca	
2022	Dove finiscono i mandarini?	Sara	Short film
2022	I Am the Abyss	The Girl with the Purple Hair Lock	
2022	Improvvisamente Natale	Chiara	
2023	A Freaking Wedding!	Salmetta	
2023	Mimì: Prince of Darkness	Carmilla	
2023	Nina of the Wolves	Nina	
2024	The Life Apart	Rebecca Macola at 10	
2024	The Boy with Pink Pants	Sara	
2024	Per il mio bene	Alida	
2025	Invisibles	Elise	
2026	Greta e le favole vere	Greta	
2026	The End Is Blue	Motta	

Television
Year	Title	Role	Notes
2018	The Miracle	Alma Pietromarchi	8 episodes
2020	The Promised Life	Young Sarah	3 episodes
2021	Anna	Snow White	Episode "The Invisible Boar"
2021–present	Blanca	Lucia Ottonello	Main role
2022	Romulus	Etruscan girl	Episode 2x04
