= Who Framed Santa Claus? =

- Italian: Chi ha incastrato Babbo Natale?
- Directed by: Alessandro Siani
- Written by: Gianluca Ansanelli; Tito Buffulini; Alessandro Siani
- Starring: Alessandro Siani; Christian De Sica
- Cinematography: Tani Canevari
- Edited by: Valentina Mariani
- Music by: Umberto Scipione
- Release date: 16 December 2021
- Running time: 104 minutes
- Country: Italy
- Language: Italian
- Box office: $2,349,735

Who Framed Santa Claus? (Italian: Chi ha incastrato Babbo Natale?) is a 2021 Italian Christmas comedy film directed by Alessandro Siani.

== Cast ==
- Alessandro Siani as Genny Catalano
- Christian De Sica as Santa Claus
- Diletta Leotta as Sasha
- Leigh Gill as Romeo
- Martin Francisco Montero Baez as Checco
- Angela Finocchiaro as Befana
- Sara Ciocca as Rebecca
- Leonie Renée Klein as the German tourist's wife
