= Capriccio (1987 film) =

- Directed by: Tinto Brass
- Written by: Tinto Brass; Vincenzo Maria Siniscalchi
- Produced by: Aurelio De Laurentiis; Luigi De Laurentiis; Giovanni Bertolucci
- Starring: Nicola Warren; Andy J. Forest
- Cinematography: Silvano Ippoliti
- Edited by: Tinto Brass
- Music by: Riz Ortolani
- Release date: 25 February 1987
- Running time: 98 minutes
- Country: Italy
- Languages: Italian; English

Capriccio, also released with the international titles Love & Passion and Capri Remembered, is an Italian erotic drama film directed by Tinto Brass. It is a liberal adaptation of the novel Le lettere da Capri by Mario Soldati.

== Plot ==
Jennifer and Fred are an American couple who met during their World War II service on the island of Capri. In the year 1947, they return to the island for their holiday and past memories as well as disappointments of their married life soon lead them to their former crushes on the island to whom they have been writing letters. Jennifer meets Ciro, a womaniser waiter who deflowered her and has now become an affluent pimp while Fred finds prostitute Rosalba. However, they are to realise that years have changed much more than they expected.

== Cast ==
- Nicola Warren: Jennifer
- Andy J. Forest: Fred
- Luigi Laezza: Ciro
- Francesca Dellera: Rosalba
- Isabella Biagini: Stella Polaris
- Vittorio Caprioli: Don Vincenzo
- Venantino Venantini: Alfredo
- Beatrice Brass: Alice the babysitter (credited as Bea)
- Carla Cipriani: the hotel owner (cameo)
- Tinto Brass: the client (cameo)
