= Carla Signoris =

Italian actress

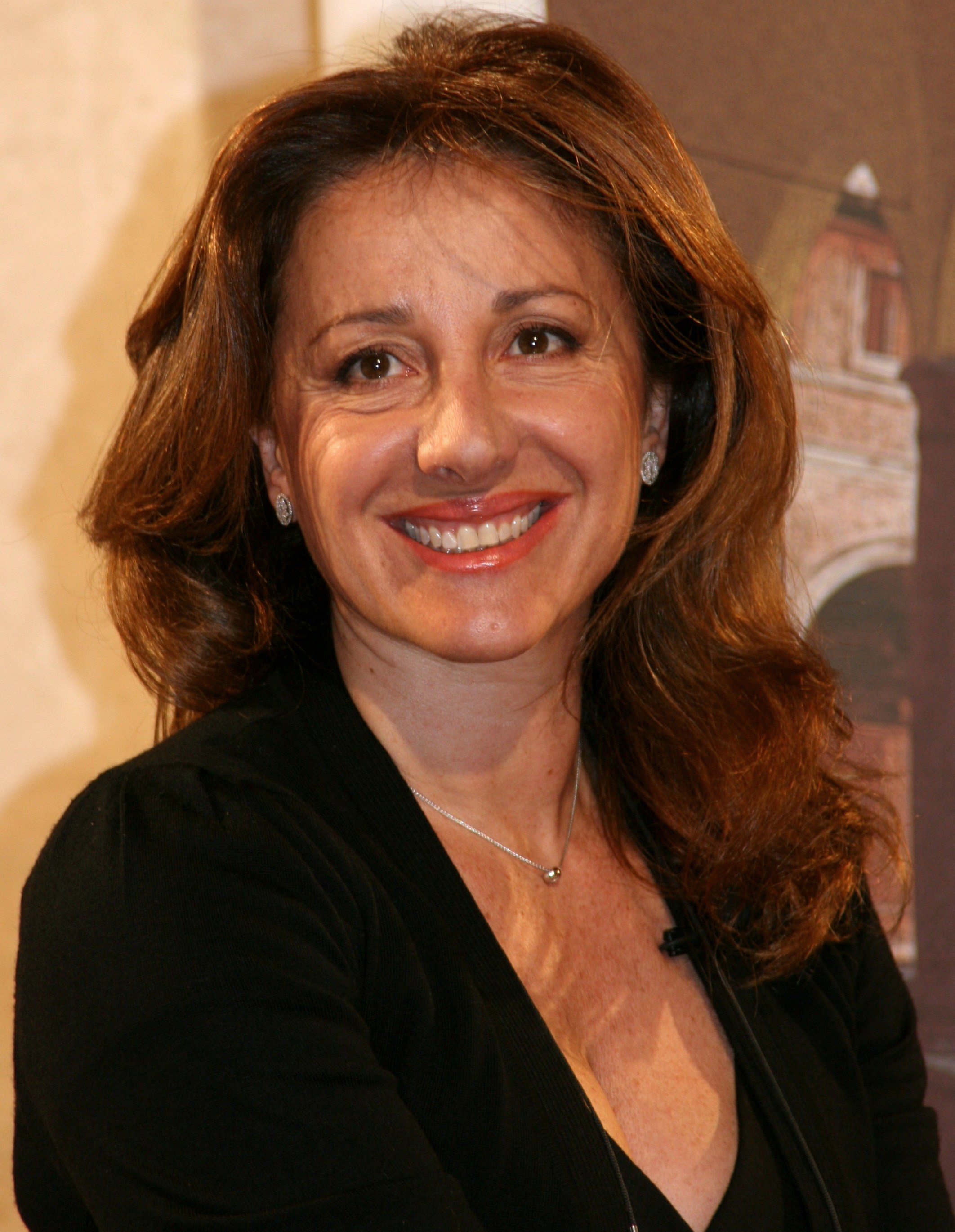
- Signoris in 2011
- Born: 10 October 1958 (age 67); Genoa, Italy
- Occupations: Actress; comedian
- Spouse: Maurizio Crozza

Carla Signoris (Italian pronunciation: [ˈkarla siɲˈɲoːris]; born 10 October 1958) is an Italian actress and comedian.

In 2009 she was nominated to the David di Donatello for Best Supporting Actress for her performance in Ex.

As a dubber, she provided the Italian voice to Dory in Finding Nemo and Finding Dory and to Mrs. Krum in Klaus.

== Filmography ==
=== Films ===
Year	Title	Role	Notes
1995	Peggio di così si muore	Anna	
1995	La bruttina stagionata	Marilina	
1999	All the Moron's Men	President's secretary	
2001	Quore	Silvia	
2003	Finding Nemo	Dory (voice)	Italian voice-over role
2005	Tutto brilla	Actress	Short film
2006	Il giorno + bello	Nina's mother	
2007	Days and Clouds	Nadia	
2009	Many Kisses Later	Loredana	
2010	Happy Family	Marta's mother	
2010	Men vs. Women	Nicoletta	
2011	Women vs. Men	Nicoletta	
2014	Fasten Your Seatbelts	Anna	
2014	Leone nel basilico	Clara	
2015	Le leggi del desiderio	Luciana Marino	
2016	Finding Dory	Dory (voice)	Italian voice-over role
2017	Mr. Happiness	Augusta	
2017	Lasciati andare	Giovanna	
2019	L'agenzia dei bugiardi	Irene	
2019	Don't Stop Me Now	Agata	
2019	La vacanza	Michela	
2019	Klaus	Mrs. Krum (voice)	Italian voice-over role
2022	The Land of Dreams	Claire	
2023	Billy	Regina	
2023	The Best Century of My Life	Gianna	
2024	Diamonds	Alida Borghese	

=== Television ===
Year	Title	Role	Notes
1997	Mamma per caso	Annamaria	Miniseries
1999	Cornetti al miele	Roberta	Television film
2004	Camera Café	Nadia	Recurring role; 3 episodes
2008–2010	Tutti pazzi per amore	Miss Carla	Main role (seasons 1–2); 46 episodes
2022	The Ignorant Angels	Veronica	Main role; 8 episodes
2025	Balene – Amiche per sempre	Milla Cappiello	Main role
