= We Can Do That =

- Theatrical release poster
- Directed by: Giulio Manfredonia
- Written by: Fabio Bonifacci; Giulio Manfredonia
- Story by: Fabio Bonifacci; Alessandro Genovesi
- Produced by: Angelo Rizzoli; Andrea Rizzoli Jr.
- Starring: Claudio Bisio; Anita Caprioli; Giuseppe Battiston
- Cinematography: Roberto Forza
- Edited by: Cecilia Zanuso
- Music by: Pivio and Aldo De Scalzi
- Production companies: Rizzoli Film; RTI
- Distributed by: Warner Bros. Pictures
- Release date: 31 October 2008
- Running time: 111 minutes
- Country: Italy
- Language: Italian
- Box office: $2.7 million

We Can Do That (Italian: Si può fare) is a 2008 Italian comedy-drama film directed by Giulio Manfredonia.

== Plot ==
1983, Milan. Nello is a trade unionist who after having written a book on the world of the market is severely attacked by his "comrades"; he was then transferred to Cooperative 180, one of the many that arose after law 180 to accommodate patients discharged from mental hospitals. After some initial friction with patients, Nello decides to make them understand the true spirit of a cooperative by involving them more.

Listening to everyone's ideas, in an assembly the decision is made to abandon care work and enter the market by becoming parquet installers: each patient will play a role within the cooperative according to his own characteristics. After their first job, which failed due to inexperience, they manage to get a contract in a high fashion atelier. On the day of the delivery deadline, the wood ends: so Luca and Gigio, given their artistic ability, decide to use the scraps to make a panel depicting a star and thus cover the entire floor. The idea, in addition to being highly appreciated, makes its way and the cooperative gets more and more contracts.

Nello realizes that there is a need to reduce the dosage of drugs, but to this Dr. Del Vecchio is strongly opposed. At this point Nello relies on dr. Furlan and with the funds received from the European Union, the partners move to a new location. When everything seems to be going well a tragedy occurs: in the meantime, in fact, Gigio falls in love with Caterina, a girl he worked for, who then invites him and Luca to a party in his house; that evening, however, they are laughed at by Caterina's friends, Luca loses control and starts a small fight. At the police station, Gigio hears Caterina who, while trying to have the complaint withdrawn, defines them as "poor things" and suggests that she has not given much importance to the kiss she had given to Gigio; as a result of this Gigio commits suicide and the fact is also attributed to the high reduction of drugs.

Patients are brought back to the old site under the assistance of Dr. Del Vecchio. Nello loses all hope, convinced that he will end up in prison for the death of Gigio, but any possible accusation against him does not take place, because Del Vecchio admits that he has found unthinkable improvements due to his work. The boy's suicide was caused in part by everyone, including Del Vecchio himself who did not want to collaborate, so the matter is closed and Nello, after some hesitation, returns to direct the cooperative which gets a large contract in Paris to decorate the stops of the new underground line.

Six months after the work for Paris is almost finished, Nello finally manages to manage the group without neglecting his girlfriend Sara (who has always remained close to him, apart from a few quarrels over her shortcomings), and Dr. Furlan brings new partners with disabilities.

== Cast ==
- Claudio Bisio as Nello
- Anita Caprioli as Sara
- Giuseppe Battiston as Dr. Federico Furlan
- Giorgio Colangeli as Dr. Del Vecchio
- Andrea Bosca as Gigio
- Giovanni Calcagno as Luca
- Michele De Virgilio as Niki
- Carlo Giuseppe Gabardini as Goffredo
- Andrea Gattinoni as Roby
- Natascia Macchniz as Luisa
- Rosa Pianeta as Enrica
- Daniela Piperno as Miriam
- Franco Pistoni as Ossi
- Pietro Ragusa as Fabio
- Franco Ravera as Carlo
- Maria Rosaria Russo as Caterina
- Bebo Storti as Padella
- Giulia Steigerwalt as Chiara

== See also ==
- List of Italian films of 2008
