= Francesca Dellera =

Italian actress and model (born 1965)

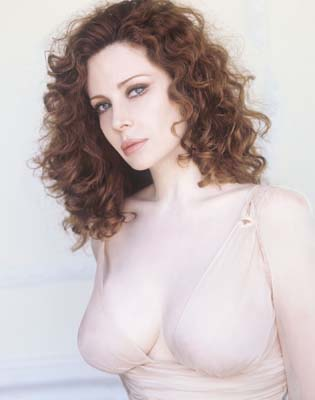
- Born: 2 October 1965 (age 61); Latina, Lazio, Italy
- Occupations: Model; actress

Francesca Dellera (born 2 October 1965) is an Italian actress and model.

== Life and career ==
Dellera was born in a Jewish family in Italy. After her high school degree in classical studies, Francesca Dellera started working as a model. She was shot by world-class photographers such as Helmut Newton, Dominique Issermann, Greg Gorman, Michel Comte as well as others. The fashion journalist Natalia Aspesi described Francesca Dellera in the following way: "When compared to the unsexy parameters that are part of the current times, Francesca Dellera is a young woman from a different era, her soft white skin is something one does not see anymore. Today, femininity is something flashy and without sex appeal as often portrayed in television or even in fashion".

Dellera was launched by film director Tinto Brass, who chose her as main actress in the erotic movie Capriccio (1987); the film was a great success making her one of the most popular actresses in Italy at the time.

The following year she shot the TV miniseries La romana, directed by Giuseppe Patroni Griffi and opposite Gina Lollobrigida.

La Romana was the television version of the film bearing the same name directed by Luigi Zampa. The film itself was based on the novel by Alberto Moravia, and in the television series, an audience of over 10 million watched Dellera in her lead role with Gina Lollobrigida (leading actress in the original film). For her performance Dellera won the Telegatto award.

With the 1991 film The Flesh directed by Marco Ferreri Dellera reached international acclaim. The film entered the 1991 Cannes Film Festival and the actress suddenly gained much popularity in France; Ferreri described Dellera as having "the most beautiful skin in Italian cinema". One of the most important Italian film critics Tullio Kezich said about Dellera in The Flesh: "Her physical allure speaks for itself. As an actress, she has something exceptionally special. She is so comfortable in front of the movie camera that when she is dressed, she seems nude, and when she is nude, she seems dressed".

Federico Fellini chose her for the role of the fairy for a film based on Collodi's Pinocchio, opposite Roberto Benigni in the main role, but the film was never made due to the director's sudden death.

Later she moved to Paris, where she had an affair with Christopher Lambert and she was also a catwalk model for Jean Paul Gaultier. The singer Prince flew to Paris to meet with her and rented out an entire theatre to watch her movie "The Flesh" by himself. He proposed for her to appear in one of the videos to his songs, too. Although she had to turn down the offer due to other professional commitments.

In 1994 she starred in Jacques Deray's L'Ours en peluche, alongside Alain Delon, her last film; after that, she only shot TV-series.

After some years she returned in Italy where in 1999 she played the title role in Nanà, a television mini-series directed by Alberto Negrin, based on the eponymous novel by Émile Zola. After a lack of some year, in 2006 she returned in the TV film La contessa di Castiglione, an Italian-French co-production directed by Josée Dayan, alongside Jeanne Moreau; this is her last appearance on screen.

She also appeared in several advertising campaigns.

== Filmography ==
=== Films ===
Year	Title	Role	Notes
1986	Grandi magazzini	Girl in red	Cameo appearance
1987	Capriccio	Rosalba Moniconi	
1987	Roba da ricchi	Princess Topazia	Segment: "Terzo episodio"
1991	The Flesh	Francesca	
1994	The Teddy Bear	Chantal	

=== Television ===
Year	Title	Role	Notes
1988	La romana	Adriana	Miniseries
1989	La bugiarda	Isabella	Television film
2001	Nanà	Nanà	Miniseries
2006	La contessa di Castiglione	Virginia Oldoini, Countess of Castiglione	Television film
