= La seconda volta non si scorda mai =

2008 Italian romantic comedy film

- Film poster
- Directed by: Francesco Ranieri Martinotti
- Written by: Francesco Albanese; Francesco Ranieri Martinotti; Alessandro Siani
- Produced by: Mauro Berardi
- Starring: Alessandro Siani; Elisabetta Canalis
- Cinematography: Mario Amura
- Music by: Pino Daniele
- Release date: 11 April 2008
- Running time: 100 minutes
- Country: Italy
- Language: Italian

La seconda volta non si scorda mai (The Second Time Is Never Forgotten) is a 2008 Italian romantic comedy film directed by Francesco Ranieri Martinotti and starring Alessandro Siani and Elisabetta Canalis. The theme song, "O munn va", by Pino Daniele, was nominated for a Nastro d'Argento award for Best Original Song.

== Synopsis ==
Young Giulio is a successful real estate agent. One day, he discovers that the girlfriend of one of his clients is Ilaria, a girl that Giulio loved at school. Inside Giulio, the old flame is rekindled; however, Ilaria is about to marry a man much older than her. When she sends Giulio an email, asking him to meet, he discovers that the passion is mutual and the two become lovers. The emotional response of Giulio's parents, combined with the fact that Ilaria is ready to give up her impending marriage for him, send Giulio into a state chaos.

== Cast ==
- Alessandro Siani as Giulio Terracciano
- Elisabetta Canalis as Ilaria Fiorito
- Paolo Ruffini as Filippo
- Marco Messeri as Monsignor Guidoni
- Francesco Albanese as Mario Saggiamo
- Sergio Solli as Nicola Terracciano
- Enzo De Caro as Alberto Ridolfi
- Fiorenza Marchegiani as Marisa Terracciano
- Clara Bindi as Clara
- Niccolò Senni as Giacomo Battistero

== See also ==
- List of Italian films of 2008
