= Fiorenza Marchegiani =

Italian actress (1953–2026)

- Born: 31 July 1953; Osimo, Italy
- Died: 11 August 2026 (aged 73); Albano Laziale, Italy
- Occupation: Actress

Fiorenza Marchegiani (31 July 1953 – 11 August 2026) was an Italian actress.

Marchegiani alternated between film and stage acting throughout her career, and was the mother of footballer Filippo Scardina.

Marchegiani died in Albano Laziale on 11 August 2026, at the age of 73.

== Filmography ==
- I'm Starting from Three (1981)
- Scusa se è poco (1982)
- D'Annunzio (1987)
- Natale a New York (2006)
- La seconda volta non si scorda mai (2008)
