= The Flesh =

1991 film

- Film poster
- Directed by: Marco Ferreri
- Written by: Liliane Betti; Massimo Bucchi; Paolo Costella; Marco Ferreri
- Produced by: Giuseppe Auriemma
- Starring: Sergio Castellitto; Francesca Dellera
- Cinematography: Ennio Guarnieri
- Edited by: Ruggero Mastroianni
- Distributed by: Variety Distribution
- Release date: 21 August 1991
- Running time: 90 minutes
- Country: Italy
- Language: Italian

The Flesh (Italian: La carne) is a 1991 Italian drama film directed by Marco Ferreri. It was entered into the 1991 Cannes Film Festival.

== Plot ==
Paolo is a municipal employee, who in his spare time works at the piano bar of a club, is divorced and has two children who live with his ex-wife. Paolo often recalls his mother and his First Communion, with which he seems to live a totalizing experience in the divine.

In his friend Nicola's nightclub, Paolo meets the young Francesca, back from a relationship with an Indian guru, who has just had an abortion and is alone. Intimacy develops between the two: according to Paolo, this is the victory of the ultra sex and of the fusion that completes and exalts everything, a fusion that Francesca assures him thanks to a special oriental technique, which allows the partner a state of permanent efficiency.

They shut themselves up in his beach house south of Rome where, after filling the fridge, they spend their time eating and making love, interrupted only by a quick incursion of Paolo's children visiting him and a small group of friends. But Francesca at a given moment thinks of leaving for other shores, while Paolo understands that in order to "communicate" there is really only one alternative: either to love each other totally, or to tear apart that voluptuous female body, put it in the fridge and eat it by the sea in front of the sun. Thus, after having made animalistic love in the kennel of the beloved dog Giovanni, Paolo's insane anxiety is satisfied: he kills Francesca, cuts her up and keeps her in the refrigerator, eating her piece by piece.

== Cast ==
- Sergio Castellitto - Paolo
- Francesca Dellera - Francesca
- Philippe Léotard
- Farid Chopel
- Petra Reinhardt
- Gudrun Gundelach
- Nicoletta Boris
- Clelia Piscitelli
- Elena Wiedermann
- Sonia Topazio
- Fulvio Falzarano
- Pino Tosca
- Eleonora Cecere
- Matteo Ripaldi
- Daniele Fralassi
- Salvatore Esposito
