= Non c'è più religione =

2016 Italian comedy film

- Film poster
- Directed by: Luca Miniero
- Written by: Luca Miniero; Sandro Petraglia; Astutillo Smeriglia
- Starring: Claudio Bisio; Alessandro Gassmann; Angela Finocchiaro
- Cinematography: Daniele Ciprì
- Edited by: Francesca Calvelli
- Music by: Pasquale Catalano
- Production companies: Cattleya; Rai Cinema
- Distributed by: 01 Distribution
- Release date: December 7, 2016 (Italy)
- Running time: 90 minutes
- Country: Italy
- Language: Italian

Non c'è più religione (lit. 'There's no religion anymore') is a 2016 Italian comedy film directed by Luca Miniero.

== Cast ==
- Claudio Bisio as Cecco
- Alessandro Gassmann as Bilal
- Angela Finocchiaro as Sister Marta
- Nabiha Akkari as Haida
- Mehdi Meskar as Alì
- Laura Adriani as Maddalena
- Giovanni Cacioppo as Aldo
- Massimo De Lorenzo as Don Mario
- Giovanni Esposito as the Bishop's secretary
- Roberto Herlitzka as the Bishop
- Paola Casella as Addolorata
- Nunzia Schiano as Bilal's mother
- Mounir Echchaoui as Ahmed
- Grazia Daddario as Gilda
