= Benvenuti al Sud =

2010 film by Luca Miniero

- Theatrical release poster
- Directed by: Luca Miniero
- Screenplay by: Massimo Gaudioso
- Based on: Welcome to the Sticks by: Dany Boon; Franck Magnier; Alexandre Charlot
- Produced by: Riccardo Tozzi; Giovanni Stabilini; Marco Chimenz; Francesca Longardi
- Starring: Claudio Bisio; Alessandro Siani; Angela Finocchiaro; Valentina Lodovini; Nando Paone; Giacomo Rizzo
- Cinematography: Paolo Carnera
- Edited by: Valentina Mariani
- Music by: Umberto Scipione
- Production companies: Medusa Film; Cattleya; Sky; Constantin Film Production
- Distributed by: Medusa Distribuzione (Italy); Constantin Film (Germany)
- Release dates: 1 October 2010 (Italy); 5 May 2011 (Germany)
- Running time: 106 minutes
- Countries: Italy; Germany
- Languages: Italian; Western Lombard; Neapolitan; French

Benvenuti al Sud (English: Welcome to the South) is a 2010 comedy film directed by Luca Miniero, a remake of the 2008 French film Welcome to the Sticks. The film was dedicated to Angelo Vassallo, an Italian mayor murdered for his anti-crime campaign. A sequel, Benvenuti al Nord, was released in 2012.

== Plot ==
Alberto Colombo is the postmaster of Usmate Velate in Brianza, fails to secure a transfer to Milan, which was given to a disabled colleague, much to the disappointment of both himself and his wife, who both wanted to move to the Lombardic capital for a number of reasons, including securing their son Chicco's future. In an attempt to get the transfer he feigns Paraplegia, however, he inadvertently stands up while meeting the inspector sent to verify his disability. As punishment, Alberto is transferred South to become postmaster of the provincial village of Castellabate, described in the movie as being near Naples. Should he refuse this transfer, he would be dismissed.

Before moving, he informs himself as to the living conditions in the South with members of the Academy of the gorgonzola to which he belongs. Alberto is warned that there are many significant problems with the south, including mafia, garbage in the streets, and stifling heat. After loading his car with fire extinguishers, sunscreen with a high protection, body armor, and mousetraps, and hiding his wedding ring, Alberto departs for Castellabate. After a long journey, exacerbated by a major traffic jam, in which he compares his situation to that of his brother, who fought in the Kosovo War, he arrives late at night, greeted by pouring rain. Despite his initial trepidation, he eventually befriends postman Mattia Volpe, Maria Flagello, and constables "Grande" (meaning "Large") and "Piccolo" (meaning "Small"), and ends up appreciating the beauty and the lifestyle of the town, realising that all of the negative perceptions of the south that he held were mere prejudice.

However, he conveys the opposite impression to Silvia, who seems biased against the south, and seeing an opportunity to strengthen their relationship, lies to her about conditions in the south, telling her that it is dangerous, unsanitary, and unpleasant. Silvia eventually decides to visit, and Alberto is forced to admit to his friends that he lied to his wife about the south, and spoke ill of them behind their backs. His friends initially resent him for what he did, but eventually the entire village decides to pull an elaborate ruse designed to give Silvia the impression that the south really is as bad as Alberto had been saying. The ruse works for some time, but then Silvia finds out and threatens divorce, thinking that Alberto was having an affair with Maria.

However, with Alberto's encouragement, Mattia and Maria get back together, as do Silvia and Alberto. Alberto's family joins him in the south, and after some time, he finally receives his long-awaited transfer to Milan. Though he and Silvia are happy to go home, they leave the south with heavy hearts.

== Cast ==
- Claudio Bisio as Alberto Colombo
- Alessandro Siani as Mattia Volpe
- Angela Finocchiaro as Silvia Colombo
- Valentina Lodovini as Maria
- Nando Paone as constable "Piccolo"
- Riccardo Zinna as the traffic policeman
- Nunzia Schiano as Mattia's mother
- Salvatore Misticone as Signor Scapece
- Francesco Albanese as the motorcyclist
- Naike Rivelli as a policewoman
- Teco Celio as Gran Maestro
- Giacomo Rizzo as constable "Grande"
- Fulvio Falzarano as Mario
- Alessandro Vighi as Chicco Colombo
