= Sandrine in the Rain =

2008 film directed by Tonino Zangardi

- Directed by: Tonino Zangardi
- Written by: Angelo Orlando; Tonino Zangardi
- Produced by: Pier Luigi Corvi-Mora
- Starring: Sara Forestier; Adriano Giannini; Goya Toledo; Luca Lionello; Monica Guerritore; Alessandro Haber
- Cinematography: Giovanni Mammolotti
- Edited by: Osvaldo Bargero
- Release date: 2008
- Countries: Italy; Germany
- Language: English

Sandrine in the Rain (Italian: Sandrine nella pioggia) is a 2008 thriller film written and directed by Tonino Zangardi and starring Sara Forestier and Adriano Giannini. It premiered at the 2008 Busan International Film Festival.

== Plot ==
During a shootout with bandits who have just robbed a bank, a police officer inadvertently hits an innocent young woman, Martine, killing her. Destroyed by guilt, Leonardo leaves his post as an agent to move on to an office job and groped to recover his inner balance away from the road. But he knows the charming Sandrine who arrives in him life upsetting him. Sandrine is actually Martine's sister and her goal was to ruin the agent's life to avenge her sister. However Sandrine falls in love with Leonardo and the plan would fail, were it not for Vincent, Sandrine's accomplice.

== Cast ==
- Sara Forestier as Sandrine
- Adriano Giannini as Leonardo
- Luca Lionello as Vincenzo
- Goya Toledo as Giuliana
- Monica Guerritore as Carolina
- Alessandro Haber as Conte
- Elsa Mollien as Martine
- Gaetano Carotenuto as Vincent

== See also ==
- List of Italian films of 2008
