= Giacomo Rizzo =

Italian film actor

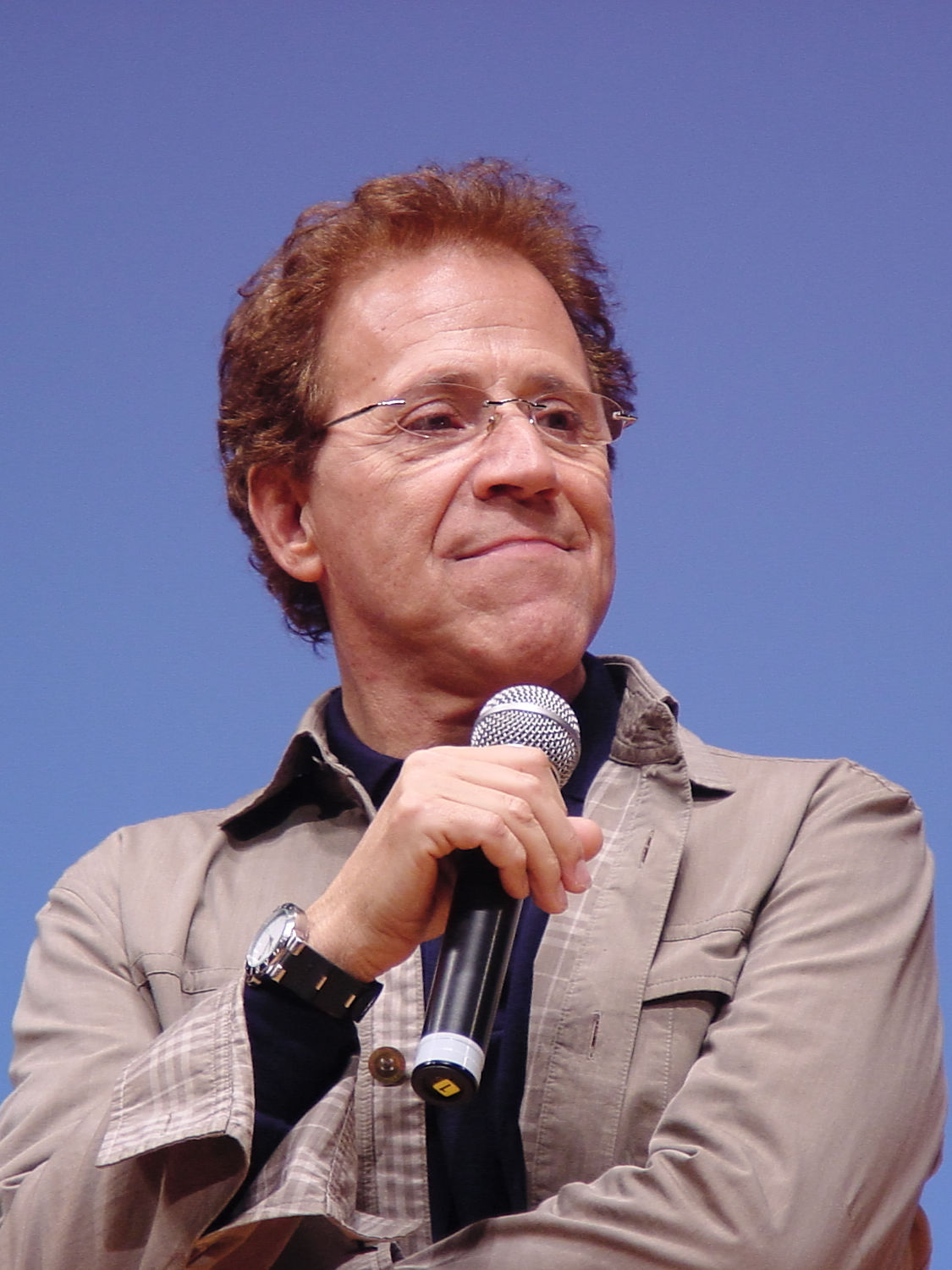
- Born: 17 January 1939 (age 87); Naples, Italy
- Occupation: Actor
- Years active: 1970–present
- Height: 1.66 m (5 ft 5 in)

Giacomo Rizzo (born 17 January 1939) is an Italian film actor. He has appeared in more than 40 films since 1970. He starred in The Family Friend, which was entered into the 2006 Cannes Film Festival.

== Selected filmography ==
- Le notti peccaminose di Pietro l'Aretino (1972)
- Il sindacalista (1972)
- The Ribald Decameron (1972)
- Little Funny Guy (1973)
- Bawdy Tales (1973)
- The Black Hand (1973)
- Erotomania (1974)
- 1900 (1976)
- Sex Diary (1976)
- La professoressa di scienze naturali (1976)
- The Virgo, the Taurus and the Capricorn (1977)
- Taxi Girl (1977)
- Deadly Chase (1978)
- A Policewoman on the Porno Squad (1979)
- Dracula Blows His Cool (1979)
- Zappatore (1980)
- A Policewoman in New York (1981)
- The Mafia Triangle (1981)
- The Family Friend (2006)
- Benvenuti al Sud (2010)
- Benvenuti al Nord (2012)
- Si accettano miracoli (2015)
