= Bar Sport =

2011 film

- Film poster
- Directed by: Massimo Martelli
- Written by: Massimo Martelli; Nicola Alvau; Giannandrea Pecorelli; Michele Pellegrini
- Produced by: Giannandrea Pecorelli
- Starring: Claudio Bisio
- Cinematography: Roberto Cimatti
- Music by: Gatto Ciliegia
- Distributed by: 01 Distribution
- Release date: October 21, 2011
- Country: Italy
- Language: Italian

Bar Sport is a 2011 comedy film written and directed by Massimo Martelli and starring Claudio Bisio. It is based on a novel with the same name written by Stefano Benni.

== Plot ==
The film, set in the mid-seventies, tells episodes of daily life that involve regulars and patrons of a modest bar in the Bolognese province. From a trip out of town to have lunch in a cramped farmhouse recommended by one of the customers, to unfortunate trips to follow Bologna, to the tales of the deeds of unlikely and surreal sports champions, to then conclude with the classic Christmas raffle organized by the manager: a to frame all this there is always the Bar Sport.

== Cast ==
- Claudio Bisio as Eros
- Giuseppe Battiston as Onassis
- Antonio Catania as Muzzi
- Bob Messini as Cocosecco
- Angela Finocchiaro as Old Lady
- Lunetta Savino as Old Lady
- Antonio Cornacchione as Bovinelli
- Teo Teocoli as Renzo
- Stefano Bicocchi as Buzzi
- Aura Rolenzetti as Clara
- Gianluca Impastato as Pinotti
- Alessandro Sampaoli as Poluzzi
- Claudio Amendola as Client
- Giorgio Comaschi as Client

== See also ==
- List of Italian films of 2011
