= La scuola più bella del mondo =

2014 Italian comedy film

- Film poster
- Directed by: Luca Miniero
- Written by: Daniela Gambaro; Massimo Gaudioso; Luca Miniero
- Starring: Christian De Sica; Rocco Papaleo; Angela Finocchiaro; Miriam Leone
- Cinematography: Federico Angelucci
- Edited by: Giogiò Franchini
- Music by: Santi Pulvirenti
- Production companies: Cattleya; Banca Popolare di Vicenza
- Distributed by: Universal Pictures
- Release date: 13 November 2014 (Italy)
- Running time: 90 minutes
- Country: Italy
- Language: Italian

La scuola più bella del mondo (lit. 'The most beautiful school in the world') is a 2014 Italian comedy film directed by Luca Miniero.

== Cast ==
- Christian De Sica as Principal Filippo Brogi
- Rocco Papaleo as Professor Gerardo Gergale
- Angela Finocchiaro as Professor Wanda Pacini
- Miriam Leone as Professor Margherita Rivolta
- Lello Arena as Principal Arturo Moscariello
- Massimo De Lorenzo as the Inspector
- Roberto Farnesi as Principal Virgilio Neri
- Ubaldo Pantani as Assessor Duccio Burroni
- Swami Caputo as Gaia
- Nicola Rignanese as Augusto Soreda
- Nadia Aldridge as Lady Coleridge
- Giulia Mombelli as Mrs. Ghioni
