= Zanzibar (TV series) =

- Genre: Sitcom
- Starring: Gigio Alberti; Cesare Bocci; Karina Huff; Angela Finocchiaro; Silvio Orlando; Gianni Palladino; Antonio Catania; Claudio Bisio; David Riondino
- Theme music composer: David Riondino
- Country of origin: Italy
- No. of seasons: 1
- No. of episodes: 41

Production
- Camera setup: Multiple
- Running time: 25 minutes

Original release
- Network: Italia Uno
- Release: September 12 – November 5, 1988

Zanzibar is an Italian television sitcom which aired from 12 September to 5 November 1988. It was broadcast on the private TV channel Italia Uno. The cast included Claudio Bisio, David Riondino, Cesare Bocci, and Antonio Catania.

== See also ==
- List of Italian television series
