= Si accettano miracoli =

- Directed by: Alessandro Siani
- Screenplay by: Alessandro Siani; Gianluca Ansaleni; Tito Buffolini
- Story by: Alessandro Siani; Gianluca Ansaleni; Tito Buffolini
- Starring: Alessandro Siani; Fabio De Luigi; Serena Autieri
- Cinematography: Paolo Carnera
- Music by: Umberto Scipione; Sal Da Vinci
- Production companies: Cattleya; Rai Cinema (it)
- Distributed by: 01 Distribution (it)
- Release date: January 1, 2015
- Running time: 110 min
- Country: Italy
- Language: Italian
- Box office: US$17.3 million

Si accettano miracoli is a 2015 Italian comedy film starring and directed by Alessandro Siani. The film was released on January 1, 2015 to generally positive reviews and favorable responses.

== Plot ==
Fulvio arrives in a small town in Campania, after an altercation when being fired from the company where he worked. After a period locked up, he has been released into the supervision of his sister and his brother, Don Germano, the minister. Fulvio understands that the situation in the town is desperate. Don Germano reveals that the situation is dire because the Lower Citadel does not bring in tourism, so the amenities are as ancient as the citizens. Fulvio notices a loose panel on the ceiling of the chapel that pours water onto the face of the statue of St. Thomas. Fulvio, as a management professional, researches about miracles and makes plans. One day, while Fr. Don Germano is celebrating Mass, a devout old woman sees the drops of this water, believes they are tears, and declares to the others that it is a miracle. The news spreads, and so leads to pilgrimages from cities all over Italy to see the statue of the crying saint. Fulvio exploits this to the maximum with various branding and marketing strategies. This brings economic benefit for the lower town as well as the orphanage. However, locals from the rival Upper Citadel are not happy with this popularity and the Vatican is brought in to investigate the matter ...meanwhile Fulvio is lovestruck in the village but is offered a job back in the city. Does the town get a second-chance, will there be a divine intervention?

Does Fulvio get together with his love, does he get the new job? Is the town's problem solved by Fr. Germano, can Fr. Germano convince the Vatican investigators...? All these puzzles are played out in this hilarious movie with the scenic backdrop of the Amalfi coast.

== Cast ==
- Alessandro Siani: Fulvio Canfora
- Fabio De Luigi: Don Germano Canfora
- Serena Autieri: Adele Canfora
- Ana Caterina Morariu: Chiara
- Giovanni Esposito: Vittorio
- Giacomo Rizzo: Carmine
- Miloud Mourad Benamara: Karim

== Production ==
The film was shot between Naples, Sant'Agata de' Goti and the town of Scala, on the Amalfi coast near Ravello, in May 2014.

During filming in the town of Benevento, the entire television crew was the protagonist of an external rehearsal of MasterChef Italia 4, in which the contestants prepared 80 baskets to be consumed during the lunch break.

== Reception ==
After its second weekend, the film had earned US$8.5 million at the Italian box office. As of February 1, 2015, it had grossed US$17.3 million at the Italian box office.
