= Arnaldo Catinari =

Italian cinematographer and film director (born 1964)

- Born: 9 January 1964 (age 61); Bologna, Italy
- Occupation: Cinematographer
- Years active: 1985—present

Arnaldo Catinari (born 9 January 1964) is an Italian cinematographer and film director.

== Career ==
Born in Bologna, Catinari studied architecture at the University of Florence and in 1983 he enrolled in a course in cinematography at the Centro Sperimentale di Cinematografia under Carlo Di Palma and Giuseppe Lanci. From 1985, he worked extensively as a cinematographer for short films and, since the mid-1990s, for feature films. He has also been active as a director of short films and in 1992 he directed his first and only feature-length film, Dall'altra parte del mondo.

== Awards ==
Catinari won a Nastro d'Argento for best cinematography in 2008 for his work in the films The Demons of St. Petersberg and Parlami d'amore.
