= Fulvio Falzarano =

Italian actor

- Born: 1959 (age 66–67); Trieste, Italy
- Occupation: Actor

Fulvio Falzarano is an Italian actor.

== Career ==
Fulvio Falzarano has worked in various companies in major Italian theatres. He worked with directors such as Mario Monicelli, Armando Pugliese, Renato Sarti and Giorgio Pressburger. He participated in two plays in one act of Peppino De Filippo with the Italian actors Silvio Orlando, Marina Confalone and Enzo Cannavale. With the Teatro Stabile del Veneto he played in Le Triomphe de l'amour di Marivaux, directed by Luca De Fusco.

For cinema he worked with Marco Ferreri, and he played the role of Sergeant Venerato Barzottin in Mario Monicelli's film Le rose del deserto (2006). He appeared in a few TV programmes with Renzo Arbore. In 2010, he gained fame with the role of Mario in the film Benvenuti al Sud, and he interpreted the same character in 2012 in the film Benvenuti al Nord.

== Selected filmography ==
- The House of Smiles (La casa del sorriso), by Marco Ferreri (1991)
- La carne, by Marco Ferreri (1991)
- Supplì, by Vincenzo Verdecchi (1993)
- Più leggero non-basta, by Elisabetta Lodoli (1998) – film TV
- La scarpa rossa, by Fabrizio Ancillai (2002), short film
- Le rose del deserto, by Mario Monicelli (2006)
- Questioni di pelle, by Bibi Bozzato (2006)
- Dall'altra parte del mare, by Jean Sarto (2009)
- Diverso da chi?, by Umberto Riccioni Carteni (2009)
- Ruggine, by Daniele Gaglianone (2010)
- Tempo di reazione, by Antonio Micciulli (2010)
- Benvenuti al Sud, by Luca Miniero (2010)
- Benvenuti al Nord, by Luca Miniero (2012)
- Un caso di coscienza 5, by Luigi Perelli, episode "Una promessa mantenuta" (2013)
- Wannabe Widowed, by Massimo Venier (2013)
