= Angela Finocchiaro =

Italian actress

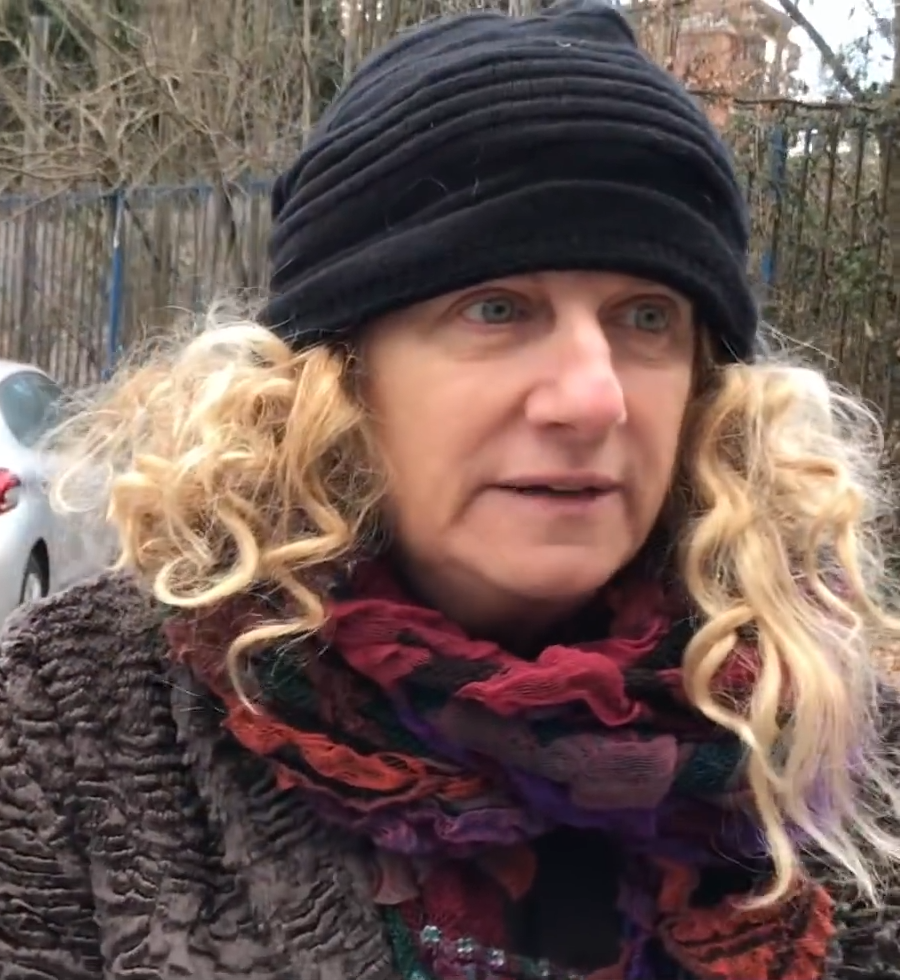
- Born: 20 November 1955 (age 70); Milan, Italy
- Occupation: Actress
- Height: 1.72 m (5 ft 8 in)

Angela Finocchiaro (born 20 November 1955) is an Italian actress.

She won the David di Donatello for Best Supporting Actress in 2006 for her performance in Don't Tell and in 2007 for her role of Amelia Benassi in My Brother Is an Only Child.

== Filmography ==
=== Film ===
Year	Title	Role(s)	Notes
1976	Allegro Non Troppo	Member of The Orchestra	Voice role
1979	Ratataplan	The Girl of The Rags	
1980	I Made a Splash	Angela	
1986	Il burbero	Emilia	
1987	Man on Fire	Marisa, Foot Race Pro	Cameo appearance
1988	It's Happening Tomorrow	Lady Rowena	
1989	Luisa, Carla, Lorenza e... le affettuose lontananze	Carla	
1989	Io, Peter Pan	Daniela	
1991	To Want to Fly	Martina	
1991	The Yes Man	Irene	
1991	The Invisible Wall	Giannina	
1992	Acquitted for Having Committed the Deed	Mariuccia	
1992	Ostinato destino	Lucrezia Rambaldi	
1993	The Storm Is Coming	Concettina	
1994	Quando le montagne finiscono	Mariangela	
1995	Bidoni	Sandra	
1998	Kaputt Mundi	Mrs. Rinaldi	
2004	Don't Move	Ada	
2004	13 at a Table	Piera	
2005	Don't Tell	Maria	
2007	Flying Lessons	Annalisa	
2007	My Brother Is an Only Child	Amelia Benassi	
2008	Love, Soccer and Other Catastrophes	Dr. Diana Ponti	
2008	A Perfect Day	Silvana	
2008	Il cosmo sul comò	Alexandra Frinzi	
2009	I mostri oggi	Renzina	Segment: "Il vecchio e il cane"
2009	I mostri oggi	Angela	Segment: "La fine del mondo"
2009	I mostri oggi	Analyst	Segment: "Terapia d'urto"
2010	Me, Them and Lara	Dr. Elisa Draghi	
2010	Benvenuti al Sud	Silvia Colombo	
2010	The Santa Claus Gang	Inspector Bestetti	
2011	Bar Sport	Angela	
2011	Lessons in Chocolate 2	Amelia Orsetti	
2012	Benvenuti al Nord	Silvia Colombo	
2012	Il sole dentro	Chiara	
2013	Guess Who's Coming for Christmas?	Marina	
2014	A Boss in the Living Room	Doriana Manetti	
2014	La scuola più bella del mondo	Professor Wanda Pacini	
2015	Latin Lover	Susanna	
2015	Vacanze ai Caraibi	Gianna	
2016	Moana	Tala	Italian dub, voice role
2016	Solo	Valeria	
2016	Non c'è più religione	Sister Marta	
2018	I'm Back	Herself	Cameo appearance
2019	Scappo a casa	Ursula	
2020	Burraco fatale	Eugenia	
2020	La mia banda suona il pop	Micky	
2021	Who Framed Santa Claus?	Befana	
2022	Il mammone	Anna	
2022	The Price of Family	Anna Dalle Fave	
2022	Educazione fisica	Rossella	
2024	Still Fabulous	Grazia	
2024	The Price of Nonna's Inheritance	Anna Delle Fave	
2024	Amiche mai	Anna Ricca	
2024	Moana 2	Tala	Italian dub; voice role
2025	The Opera!	Orfeo's Mother	
2025	Natale senza Babbo	Therapist	
2026	Still Sexy	Grazia	
2026	It Will Happen Tonight		

=== Television ===
Year	Title	Role(s)	Notes
1988	Zanzibar	Maria	Main role
1994	A che punto è la notte	Luigina Pietrobono	Television film
1996–1998	Dio vede e provvede	Sister Amelia	Lead role
2003–2004	Mammamia!	Mamma	Lead role
2005	Belli dentro	Matilde	Episode: "L'ospite"
2005	Il supermercato	Cinzia	Main role
2008	Dottor Clown	Barbara	Television film
2009	Due mamme di troppo	Gabry Terrani	Television film
2018–2022	Carlo & Malik	Giovanna Di Castro	Main role
2019–2022	Volevo fare la rockstar	Nice Zignoni	Main role
2024	LOL - Chi ride è fuori	Herself – Contestant	Season 4
