= I mostri oggi =

- Theatrical release poster
- Directed by: Enrico Oldoini
- Written by: Franco Ferrini; Enrico Oldoini; Giacomo Scarpelli; Silvia Scola; Marco Tiberi
- Produced by: Adriano De Micheli
- Starring: Diego Abatantuono; Sabrina Ferilli; Giorgio Panariello; Claudio Bisio; Angela Finocchiaro; Carlo Buccirosso
- Cinematography: Federico Masiero
- Edited by: Mirco Garrone
- Music by: Louis Siciliano
- Production companies: Colorado Film; Dean Film
- Distributed by: Warner Bros. Pictures
- Release date: 27 March 2009
- Running time: 102 minutes
- Country: Italy
- Language: Italian
- Box office: $2,486,257

I mostri oggi (lit. 'The monsters today') is a 2009 Italian sketch comedy film directed by Enrico Oldoini.

The film is a tribute to Dino Risi's classic comedies I mostri and I nuovi mostri.

== Cast ==
- Diego Abatantuono as Diego / Daniel / Priest / Landlord / Davide / Pirate
- Sabrina Ferilli as Sabrina / Mom / Alice / Wife
- Giorgio Panariello as Remo / Giorgio / Emilio / Gino / Poor guy
- Claudio Bisio as Claudio / Patient / Enzo / Husband
- Angela Finocchiaro as Renzina / Angela / Analyst / Golf woman
- Carlo Buccirosso as Carlo / Michele / Gregorio / Sotto
- Mauro Meconi as Romeo / Boyfriend
- Susy Laude as Juliet / Girlfriend
- Anna Foglietta as Alessia / Tourist
- Sergio Forconi as Remo's father
- Pietro Fornaciari as Canaro
- Emanuela Aureli as Elda
- Rocco Giusti as Tonino
- Pilar Abella as Sabrina
- Paola Lavini as Katia
- Enzo Cannavale as Alessia's grandfather
- Rosalia Porcaro as Adele
- Mohamed Zouaoui as Ali
- Ugo Conti as Ghigo's brother
- Enzo Polidoro as the producer
- Cecilia Albertini as Cecilia
- Valeria De Franciscis as the Baroness
- Tushar as the caregiver
- Neri Marcorè as Fosco
- Antonella Morea as Margherita
- Massimo Giletti as himself
