= Natale a New York =

2006 film by Neri Parenti

- Theatrical release poster
- Directed by: Neri Parenti
- Written by: Neri Parenti; Fausto Brizzi; Marco Martani; Alessandro Bencivenni; Domenico Saverni
- Produced by: Aurelio De Laurentiis; Luigi De Laurentiis
- Starring: Christian De Sica; Sabrina Ferilli; Massimo Ghini; Claudio Bisio; Elisabetta Canalis; Alessandro Siani; Fabio De Luigi; Paolo Ruffini; Francesco Mandelli
- Cinematography: Daniele Massaccesi
- Edited by: Luca Montanari
- Music by: Bruno Zambrini
- Production company: Filmauro
- Distributed by: Filmauro
- Release date: 15 December 2006 (Italy)
- Running time: 111 minutes
- Country: Italy
- Language: Italian
- Box office: $30.4 million

Natale a New York (lit. 'Christmas in New York') is a 2006 Italian Christmas comedy film co-written and directed by Neri Parenti, starring Christian De Sica, Sabrina Ferilli, Massimo Ghini, Claudio Bisio, Elisabetta Canalis, Alessandro Siani, Fabio De Luigi, Paolo Ruffini and Francesco Mandelli. It is Parenti's first film since De Sica and Massimo Boldi ended their partnership. In Italy, the film grossed $4,844,101 (€3,701,000) in its opening weekend and $30,437,121 (€23,513,000) in total. According to Filmauro, Natale a New York was the highest-grossing film of the 2006 Christmas season.

The film was never released in the United States and to this date has not yet been released with either English subtitles or distributed in Region 1 format for DVD or Blu-ray Disc play in the US. A special edition double DVD in PAL format (DVD Region 2) was also released sometime in 2007 in Italy and Europe containing not only the feature film but a second DVD containing extra behind the scenes footage, five deleted scenes, footage from the premiere event in Italy, as well as two "TV spot" trailers. To date, the film has not been released on Blu-ray.

== Plot ==
During the Christmas holidays, three groups of funny characters depart from Italy to spend the Christmas holiday season in New York City. Camillo (Lillo) is a penniless pianist who has the fortune of marrying a rich woman named Milena. Although happy living in comfort with his wife and beautiful dependent daughter Carlotta, Lillo is still in love with Barbara, a beautiful, uneducated Roman peasant with whom he had dated years earlier. He must be careful not to break his prenuptial agreement demanded by his father-in-law before he could marry Milena and gain access to her vast fortune. Should he be untrue to Milena, he could lose all his marital gains and return to being a poor musician. A chance meeting reunites Lillo and Barbara and they resume their affair in secret. Barbara, however, is now married to Claudio, a wealthy doctor, who is also having a secret affair and is in love with Lillo's daughter Carlotta.

Dr. Severino Benci ships his assistant Filippo Vessato to New York with a mandate to deliver an expensive and rare antique medical parchment as a gift to his son Francesco, who studies in the same university in New York City his father graduated from years earlier. Filippo is also to be married that week in New York and is dismayed that his boss, the Doctor, would send him on such a distracting task. Francesco is a pleasure-loving slacker who does not attend classes, partakes in recreational drugs and hosts large parties for his friends. Filippo becomes corrupted by both Francesco and his cousin and fellow underachieving student Paolo Benci during this short visit in order to complete his task. He is having fun with them and falls in love with a college cheerleader named Sylvia during a psychedelic-induced episode at one of Francesco's parties. Filippo ends up covering for the delinquent students and lies to Dr. Benci that his son is to receive the "Student of the Year" achievement award, but Dr. Benci comes to New York to see for himself and soon suspects something is wrong. However, Filippo is to marry the love of his life in the days to come. Christmas in New York leads to some more surprises for all parties involved as their lives and situations intersect and crash during their Christmas holiday in the city.

== Cast ==
The cast of Natale a New York at Sleepy Hollow Country Club in Briarcliff Manor, New York

- Christian De Sica as Camillo "Lillo" Ferri
- Sabrina Ferilli as Barbara Ricacci
- Massimo Ghini as Claudio Ricacci
- Fabio De Luigi as Filippo Vessato
- Paolo Ruffini as Paolo Benci
- Francesco Mandelli as Francesco Benci
- Alessandro Siani as Lello
- Claudio Bisio as Dr. Severino Benci
- Elisabetta Canalis as Carlotta Ferri
- Fiorenza Marchegiani as Milena Ferri
- Amanda Gabbard as Mary
- Erika J. Othen as Sylvia
- Pamela Paul as Mary's mother
- Roy Yeager as Mary's father
- Jesse Buckler as Roosevelt Hotel director
- Eric Bright as George
- William J. Vila as taxi driver
- Bob Senkewicz as doctor
- Michael Muldoon as Detective John Palmer
- Peter Stoehr as priest
- Poofy as small white dog
- Ting Zhang as cheerleader #1 (uncredited)

== Soundtrack ==
1. Bob Sinclar feat. Steve Edwards - "World, Hold On (Children of the Sky)" (Radio Edit)
2. Michael Gray feat. Shelly Poole - "Borderline" (Radio Edit)
3. Lily Allen - "Smile" (Radio Edit)
4. The Kooks - "Naïve"
5. Corinne Bailey Rae - "Put Your Records On"
6. Seth Lakeman - "Lady of the Sea (Hear her Calling)" (New Radio Version)
7. Montefiori Cocktail - "Crazy" (Radio Edit)
8. Kenny - "I Love New York"
9. The House Keepers - "Feel Da Feeling" (Radio Edit)
10. Karis & Luke feat. Groove In Mind - "Dancer"
11. T-bone - "And I Feel Like"
12. Roselyn - "Music in Me"
13. Big Apple - "In The City" (House Mix)
14. Gnarls Barkley - Smiley faces (Edit)
15. Resound - "La mia faccia inutile (Lei che ride)"
16. Paolo Sandrini - "Green Sea"

== Production ==
=== Deleted scenes ===
1. "In piscina" (By the Pool Somewhere in Italy - perhaps this would have been one of the funniest scenes in the film and shouldn't have been deleted - Christian De Sica at his best - deleted take)
2. "Camera d'Albergo" (Roosevelt Hotel scene with Ghini and Ferilli planning on cheating on each other some more - deleted take)
3. "Jeep" (Governor's Island location as Riverside College - appears to be a scene of the students and Vesato (De Luigi) getting a ride in the Jeep to the Wedding Rehearsal Dinner - deleted take)
4. "Tartaruga" (Marlboro Avenue Brooklyn location - The full un-edited 'reclamation of the wedding ring' scene at the inlaws' Wedding rehearsal dinner party - this version of this scene may have been a bit too graphic for Christmas audiences and this full version of the scene with the Turtle was cut yet is very funny - deleted edit)
5. "Il bacio" ('The Million Dollar Loft' scene as Carlota's parents apartment in New York City - a cute romantic scene with Canalis and Siani ending with a kiss - deleted take)

=== Locations ===
The film was mostly shot in the New York City Metropolitan area on location and a few scenes were also shot in a soundstage in Greenpoint, Brooklyn. Most scenes were filmed in New York State less a few scenes from the start of the film which were shot in Italy earlier in 2006. New York Production started some time in mid to late September and continued through mid November. Post production was done mostly in Italy and was released for Christmas week. The New York locations included Times Square, The Roosevelt Hotel, Governors Island and the Church of Our Lady of Peace in Manhattan, as well as Water's Edge Restaurant in Queens.

=== Crew ===
The main production core crew were brought in from Italy and spoke mostly in Italian on set although they did direct the NY Union crew in English. A swing gang did some overlap scenes in New York and the earlier scenes in the film were done in Italy by the core crew and local film crew. These include scenes of; Lillo's Mansion, Lillo reuniting with Barbara, Lillo and Barbara cheating together at an apartment as well as the scene with Barbara and her husband on their Yacht.

=== Cameo scene in another Christmas film ===
In the 2011 film Vacanze di Natale a Cortina, there is a very short clip used from this film depicting Poofy the dog (actually a mechanical stunt double for Poofy) saved from an oncoming truck accident by actor Fabio De Luigi. The cameo scene is viewed by the maid, her boyfriend and dog while watching a Christmas film (Natale a New York) on the television during New Years Eve while they house-sit at their patrons home. This brief cameo scene with Poofy and De Luigi is a hidden easter egg.

== See also ==
- List of Christmas films
