= The Teddy Bear =

- Directed by: Jacques Deray
- Written by: Jacques Deray; Jean Curtelin
- Starring: Alain Delon; Francesca Dellera
- Cinematography: Luciano Tovoli
- Edited by: Nino Baragli
- Music by: Romano Musumarra
- Release date: 1994
- Countries: France; Italy
- Language: French

The Teddy Bear (French: L'ours en peluche, Italian: L’orso di peluche) is a 1994 French-Italian thriller-drama film directed by Jacques Deray. It is based on the novel L'ours en peluche by Georges Simenon.

== Cast ==
- Alain Delon as Jean Rivière
- Francesca Dellera as Chantal
- Laure Killing as Christine Rivière
- Alexandra Winisky as Axelle Rivière
- Madeleine Robinson as Mother of Jean
- Claudia Pandolfi as Claudia Spinelli
- Mattia Sbragia as Giorgio Spinelli
- Regina Bianchi as Grandmother of Claudia
- Paolo Bonacelli as Novacek
- Franco Interlenghi as Sylvain
