= Improvvisamente Natale =

2022 Italian comedy film

- Film poster
- Directed by: Francesco Patierno
- Written by: Francesco Patierno; Federico Baccomo; Neri Parenti; Gianluca Bomprezzi
- Produced by: Guglielmo Marchetti
- Starring: Diego Abatantuono; Sara Ciocca; Violante Placido; Lodo Guenzi; Michele Foresta; Antonio Catania; Gloria Guida; Anna Galiena; Nino Frassica
- Cinematography: Mike Stern Sterzynksi
- Edited by: Renata Salvatore
- Music by: Pino Donaggio
- Production company: Notorious Pictures
- Distributed by: Amazon Prime Video
- Release date: 1 December 2022 (Italy)
- Running time: 105 minutes
- Country: Italy
- Language: Italian

Improvvisamente Natale (lit. 'Suddenly Christmas') is a 2022 Italian comedy film directed by Francesco Patierno, starring Diego Abatantuono and Sara Ciocca.

The film was released via Amazon Prime Video on 1 December 2022. A sequel entitled Improvvisamente a Natale mi sposo was theatrically released on 6 December 2023.

In 2024, the American remake A Sudden Case of Christmas was released, directed by Peter Chelsom, and starring Danny DeVito and Andie MacDowell.

== Cast ==
- Diego Abatantuono as Lorenzo
- Sara Ciocca as Chiara
- Violante Placido as Alberta
- Lodo Guenzi as Giacomo
- Michele Foresta as Otto
- Antonio Catania as Mario
- Gloria Guida as Claudia
- Anna Galiena as Rosa
- Nino Frassica as Don Michele
- Luca Vecchi as Paolo
- Noli Sta Isabel as Zhou
- Paolo Hendel as Franz
- Christian Dei as Nicolò
- Luca Charles Brucini as Walter
- Dedalo Saudino as Pietro
- Ludovica Bersani as Johanna
- Karen Piana as Giorgia
- Marco Ghirlandi as Filippo
- John Kennedy Ben Gomas as Long
