= Leigh Gill =

English actor

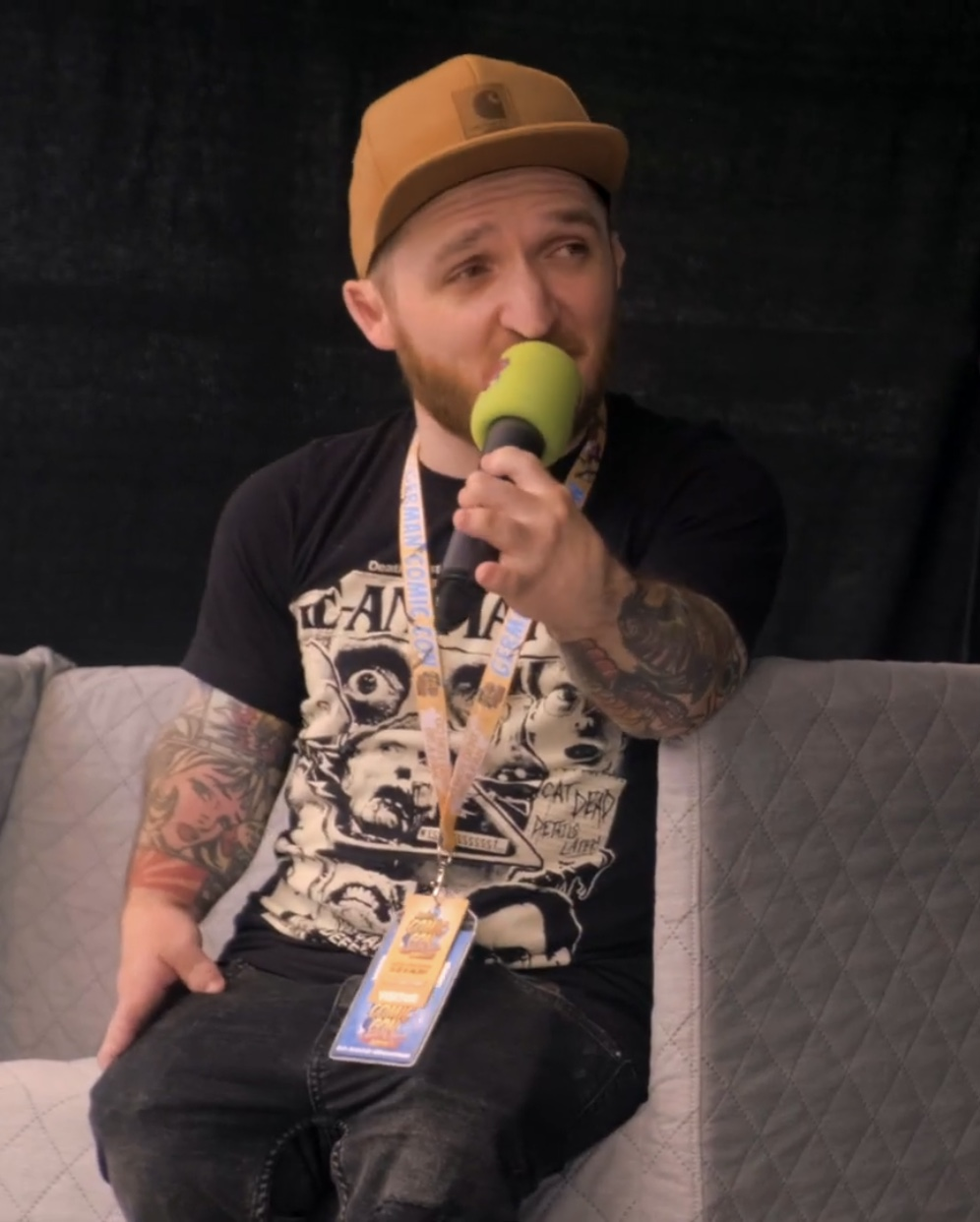
- Gill at the 2021 German Comic Con Limited Edition
- Occupation: Actor
- Years active: 2014–present

Leigh Gill is an English actor. He is best known for his roles as Bobono in Game of Thrones (2016) and as Gary Puddles in Joker (2019) and its sequel Joker: Folie à Deux (2024).

== Early life and career ==
Gill's father was in the British Army, so he moved around a lot in his childhood.

He appeared in three episodes of Game of Thrones (2016), and played Red in Fantastic Beasts and Where to Find Them (2016).

He worked alongside Joaquin Phoenix, in the movie Joker (2019) and its sequel Joker: Folie à Deux (2024). He also appeared as One-Eyed Dwarf in an episode of The Witcher in 2019.

In September 2025, it was announced that Gill would portray Griphook in the upcoming HBO Harry Potter series. He plays one of the brothers Ferox in the Starz series Spartacus: House of Ashur.

== Filmography ==
=== Film ===
Year	Title	Role	Notes
2014	Get Santa	Specs	
2015	The Scorpion King 4: Quest for Power	Chief Onus	Direct-to-video
2016	Fantastic Beasts and Where to Find Them	Red	
2018	Hot Dog	Kevin	
2018	Head Full of Honey	Vince	
2019	Joker	Gary Puddles	
2019	The Most Beautiful Day in the World	Orazio Bollè	
2021	A Woman at Night	Lee	
2021	Who Framed Santa Claus?	Romeo	
2024	Joker: Folie à Deux	Gary Puddles	
2024	Blitz	Mickey Davis	

=== Television ===
Year	Title	Role	Notes
2016	Game of Thrones	Bobono	3 episodes
2019	The Witcher	One-Eyed Dwarf	1 episode
2025–2026	Spartacus: House of Ashur	Satyrus	Main role
2026–present	Harry Potter	Griphook	
