= Many Kisses Later =

- Film poster
- Directed by: Fausto Brizzi
- Written by: Fausto Brizzi; Massimiliano Bruno; Marco Martani
- Produced by: Federica Lucisano; Fulvio Lucisano
- Starring: Claudio Bisio; Nancy Brilli; Cristiana Capotondi; Cécile Cassel; Fabio De Luigi; Alessandro Gassmann; Claudia Gerini; Flavio Insinna; Silvio Orlando; Martina Pinto; Carla Signoris; Gianmarco Tognazzi; Giorgia Würth; Malik Zidi
- Cinematography: Marcello Montarsi
- Edited by: Luciana Pandolfelli
- Music by: Bruno Zambrini
- Distributed by: 01 Distribution (Italy)
- Release date: 6 February 2009
- Running time: 120 minutes
- Countries: Italy; France
- Language: Italian
- Budget: €10 million
- Box office: €10.7 million (Italy)

Many Kisses Later (Italian: Ex) is a 2009 Italian-French romantic comedy film directed and co-written by Fausto Brizzi and interpreted by an ensemble cast.

The film, produced by Italian International Film, in co-production with the French company and Mes Films in collaboration with Rai Cinema. It was released 6 February 2009 in Italian cinema and has been recognized as "national cultural interest" by the Directorate General for Cinema of the Ministry of Heritage and Culture.

== Plot ==
The film presents the love stories of six couples, intertwined and developed between Christmas and Valentine's Day.

Sergio (Claudio Bisio), psychologist, divorced for years by Michela (Elena Sofia Ricci), is engaged to Roberta (Giorgia Wurth), but is found to be a father of two teenagers, after the sudden death of former wife, discovering by the daughters themselves, that Michela has always loved him, despite the divorce.

Filippo (Vincenzo Salemme) and Caterina (Nancy Brilli), are both divorced and struggling not to have custody of the children who see only as an obstacle to their activities. Judge Luca (Silvio Orlando) instead forces them to stay all four together and spend time doing the activities to which children are interested and then going to the theater, exhibitions and nature parks. The two not only enjoy, but find they still love each other.

The same judge Luca and his wife Loredana (Carla Signoris) are broken, and he moved to live in the student house of his son, to live with pleasure seeking divorced life. Due to an accident which occurred to her, there will be a rapprochement.

Giulia (Cristiana Capotondi), daughter of Luca and Loredana, lives with Marc (Malik Zidi) in Paris, but she is transferred from the embassy where she works, due to promotion to Wellington, New Zealand.

Elisa (Claudia Gerini) is about to marry Corrado (Gianmarco Tognazzi), but his former boyfriend Lorenzo (Flavio Insinna) in the most unpredictable: it is the priest (Don Lorenzo) that will get them married. On the altar of the three will have an important turn.

Monique (Cécile Cassel), a friend of Elisa's, is engaged to Paolo (Fabio De Luigi), a surgeon, who is threatened by the policeman Davide (Alessandro Gassman), former boyfriend of Monique. In the end, Monique leaves Paolo, who finds himself having to operate the same Davide, wounded in the stomach with a bullet. Although Paolo has repeatedly threatened, he will perform his mission and they become friends.

== Cast ==
- Alessandro Gassman: Davide
- Cécile Cassel: Monique
- Claudia Gerini: Elisa
- Cristiana Capotondi: Giulia
- Malik Zidi: Marc
- Gianmarco Tognazzi: Corrado
- Silvio Orlando: Luca
- Fabio De Luigi: Paolo
- Claudio Bisio: Sergio
- Vincenzo Salemme: Filippo
- Flavio Insinna: Don Lorenzo
- Giorgia Wurth: Roberta
- Elena Sofia Ricci: Michela
- Enrico Montesano: Mario
- Nancy Brilli: Caterina
- Carla Signoris: Loredana
- Martina Pinto: Valentina
- Vincenzo Alfieri: Andrea
- Angelo Infanti: Elisa's father
- Francesca Nunzi:Antonella
- Nathalie Rapti Gomez: Noemi
- Arthur Dupont: Jacques

== Production ==
Filming began on 15 July 2008 and ended on 4 October and the film was shot in Rome, Paris and South Africa.

Biagio Antonacci composed two songs specially for the film, "Il cielo ha una porta sola" (it, "The Sky Has a Single Door") and "Aprila" ("Open It"), both included on the album Il cielo ha una porta sola. The video for "Open It" was played by Giorgia Wurth.

The original soundtrack of the movie is by Bruno Zambrini. The soundtrack in two CD includes several Italian and foreign songs of the past, including "Fiumi di parole" ("Rivers of Words") done live in the film in a cameo by Alessandra Drusian and Fabio Ricci, known to the public as the duo Jalisse. Enzo Salvi and Dario Cassini also make cameo appearances in the film.

In the closing credits of the film there are photos and videos of a hundred anonymous kisses, sent to the web site of the film during the months preceding the release.

It became a box office hit in Cannes becoming the best selling Italian film among the participating nations.

== Box office ==
In Italian cinemas, the film earned a revenue of €10,600,000 according to data from Cinetel.

== Other media ==
The book Il manuale degli Ex (The Handbook of Ex), written by Fausto Brizzi and published by Mondadori, was released at the same time as the film.

== Awards ==
Ex received 10 David di Donatello nominations: best film, director, screenplay, supporting actor Claudio Bisio, Actress Carla Signoris, editing, music, original song, sound, David Young It also received six nominations for the Silver Ribbon: Best Comedy, Best Screenplay, Editing, Original Song, Supporting Actor Claudio Bisio – Silvio Orlando (all candidates), actress Carla Signoris, the film won the Silver Ribbon for best comedy special.

== Remake ==
A French remake entitled The Exes (film) (Les Ex in French speaking markets) was released in 2017. The film was written and directed by Maurice Barthélemy and stars Jean-Paul Rouve, Patrick Chesnais, Arnaud Ducret, Baptiste Lecaplain, Stéfi Celma, Judith El Zein, Natacha Lindinger, Alice David, Zoé Duchesne, Claudia Tagbo, Amaury de Crayencour and Maurice Barthélemy among others.
