= Mammamia! =

- Genre: Comedy
- Created by: Susanna Bacci; Maurizio Nichetti; Nello Correale
- Screenplay by: Maurizio Nichetti; Nello Correale
- Directed by: Maurizio Nichetti; Nello Correale
- Starring: Angela Finocchiaro; Maurizio Nichetti
- Theme music composer: Rumblefish Inc.
- Composers: Andrea Zuppini; Giuseppe Rinaldi
- Country of origin: Italy
- Original language: Italian
- No. of seasons: 1
- No. of episodes: 30

Production
- Executive producer: Francesco Paglioli
- Cinematography: Mario Battistoni
- Running time: 8 minutes
- Production companies: RAI; Paypermoon

Original release
- Network: Rai 2
- Release: December 24, 2003 – April 3, 2004

Mammamia! (from the interjection, meaning "My mother!") is an Italian television series, consisting of 30 non-dialogical episodes lasting 8 minutes each. Premiering in 2003–2004, it starred Angela Finocchiaro, who played the role of a mother dealing with the everyday troubles of her 4-, 7-, and 13-year-old children.

== Main cast and roles ==
Actor	Role
Angela Finocchiaro	mom
Maurizio Nichetti	security guard
Micol Camalich	13-year-old daughter
Fernanda Beretta	grandmom
Onesto Beretta	grandad
Riccardo Peroni	doctor
Paola Lorenzoni	babysitter
Osvaldo Salvi	fireman
Linda Cerabolini	perfect mom
Claudia Birilli	fit woman
Claudia Lawrence	supermarket's cunning woman
Carlina Torta	supermarket rival

== See also ==
- List of Italian television series
