= List of 2017 box office number-one films in Italy =

The following is a list of 2017 box office number-one films in Italy.

#	Date	Film	Gross	Notes
1	8 January 2017	Mister Felicità	US$3,348,930	
2	15 January 2017	Collateral Beauty	US$2,244,543	
3	22 January 2017	L'ora legale	US$3,482,059	
4	29 January 2017	L'ora legale	US$2,603,947	
5	5 February 2017	La La Land	US$1,769,344	
6	12 February 2017	Fifty Shades Darker	US$6,830,852	
7	19 February 2017	Fifty Shades Darker	US$3,038,014	
8	26 February 2017	The Great Wall	US$1,394,714	
9	5 March 2017	Logan	US$2,158,757	
10	12 March 2017	Kong: Skull Island	US$1,541,379	
11	19 March 2017	Beauty and the Beast	US$7,435,444	
12	26 March 2017	Beauty and the Beast	US$5,080,207	
13	2 April 2017	Beauty and the Beast	US$2,443,443	
14	9 April 2017	Smurfs: The Lost Village	US$870,792	
15	16 April 2017	The Fate of the Furious	US$6,677,151	
16	23 April 2017	The Fate of the Furious	US$2,720,376	
17	30 April 2017	Guardians of the Galaxy Vol. 2	US$2,393,328	
18	7 May 2017	Guardians of the Galaxy Vol. 2	US$1,233,356	
19	14 May 2017	Alien: Covenant	US$1,239,104	
20	21 May 2017	Alien: Covenant	US$607,946	
21	28 May 2017	Pirates of the Caribbean: Dead Men Tell No Tales	US$4,558,861	
22	4 June 2017	Pirates of the Caribbean: Dead Men Tell No Tales	US$2,686,505	
23	11 June 2017	The Mummy	US$1,740,095	
24	18 June 2017	The Mummy	US$895,529	
25	25 June 2017	Transformers: The Last Knight	US$2,036,054	
26	2 July 2017	Transformers: The Last Knight	US$1,029,492	
27	9 July 2017	Spider-Man: Homecoming	US$3,022,513	
28	16 July 2017	Spider-Man: Homecoming	US$1,474,396	
29	23 July 2017	Spider-Man: Homecoming	US$840,664	
30	30 July 2017	Spider-Man: Homecoming	US$516,421	
31	6 August 2017	Annabelle: Creation	US$1,095,622	
32	13 August 2017	The Dark Tower	US$836,540	
33	20 August 2017	Atomic Blonde	US$605,565	
34	27 August 2017	Despicable Me 3	US$6,430,980	
35	3 September 2017	Despicable Me 3	US$4,281,433	
36	10 September 2017	Despicable Me 3	US$2,974,290	
37	17 September 2017	Cars 3	US$4,161,313	
38	24 September 2017	Cars 3	US$2,078,942	
39	1 October 2017	The Emoji Movie	US$1,284,266	
40	8 October 2017	Blade Runner 2049	US$2,340,495	
41	15 October 2017	Blade Runner 2049	US$1,322,802	
42	22 October 2017	It	US$7,635,649	
43	29 October 2017	Thor: Ragnarok	US$3,521,059	
44	5 November 2017	Thor: Ragnarok	US$1,985,278	
45	12 November 2017	The Place	US$1,950,346	
46	19 November 2017	Justice League	US$3,544,847	
47	26 November 2017	Justice League	US$1,761,400	
48	3 December 2017	Murder on the Orient Express	US$3,844,701	
49	10 December 2017	Murder on the Orient Express	US$4,208,865	
50	17 December 2017	Star Wars: The Last Jedi	US$5,411,401	
51	24 December 2017	Star Wars: The Last Jedi	US$2,262,280	
52	31 December 2017	Coco	US$3,321,174	
