= The Most Beautiful Day in the World =

- Film poster
- Italian: Il giorno più bello del mondo
- Directed by: Alessandro Siani
- Written by: Gianluca Ansanelli; Alessandro Siani
- Starring: Alessandro Siani
- Cinematography: Michele D'Attanasio
- Edited by: Valentina Mariani
- Music by: Umberto Scipione
- Release date: 31 October 2019
- Running time: 104 minutes
- Country: Italy
- Language: Italian
- Box office: $7,088,166

The Most Beautiful Day in the World (Italian: Il giorno più bello del mondo) is a 2019 Italian fantasy comedy film directed by Alessandro Siani.

== Cast ==
- Alessandro Siani as Arturo Meraviglia
- Stefania Spampinato as Flavia Mainardi
- Giovanni Esposito as Gianni Pochi Pochi
- Leone Riva as Gioele
- Sara Ciocca as Rebecca
- Stefano Pesce as Francesco Gagliardi
- Leigh Gill as Orazio Bollè
- Jun Ichikawa as Kaori
- Benedetto Casillo as Fefè
- Nicola Rignanese as Ernesto
- Gianni Ferreri as Eduardo
- Enzo Paci as Mago Altanus
- Enrico Ianniello as Cosimo Meraviglia
