= The House of Smiles =

1991 film

- Directed by: Marco Ferreri
- Written by: Marco Ferreri; Liliane Betti; Antonino Marino
- Starring: Ingrid Thulin; Dado Ruspoli
- Release date: February 1991
- Running time: 110 minutes
- Country: Italy
- Language: Italian

The House of Smiles (Italian: La casa del sorriso) is a 1991 Italian film directed by Marco Ferreri. It depicts a romance between an old man and an old woman inside a care home.

The film won the Golden Bear at the 41st Berlin International Film Festival.

== Cast ==
- Ingrid Thulin as Adelina
- Dado Ruspoli as Andrea
- Enzo Cannavale as Avvocato
- María Mercader as Elvira
- Lucia Vasini as Giovanna
- Francesca Antonelli as Rosy
- Elisabeth Kaza as Esmeralda
- Nunzia Fumo
- Fulvio Falzarano
