= Parlami d'amore =

- Promotional poster
- Directed by: Silvio Muccino
- Written by: Silvio Muccino; Carla Vangelista
- Produced by: Marco Chimenz; Giovanni Stabilini; Riccardo Tozzi; Francesca Longardi
- Starring: Silvio Muccino; Aitana Sánchez-Gijón; Carolina Crescentini
- Cinematography: Arnaldo Catinari
- Edited by: Patrizio Marone
- Music by: Andrea Guerra
- Distributed by: On Pictures (Spain)
- Release dates: 14 February 2008 (Italy); 17 July 2009 (Spain)
- Running time: 115 minutes
- Countries: Italy; Spain
- Language: Italian

Parlami d'amore (English: Tell me about love) is a 2008 Italo-Spanish film directed by Silvio Muccino. The film is based on Muccino's novel of the same name that he co-wrote with Carla Vangelista. The film was nominated for 8 David di Donatello awards. The film was released in Italy on 14 February 2008. It was released theatrically in Spain by On Pictures on 17 July 2009.

== Plot ==
Distracted by taking her antidepressants, Nicole (Sanchez-Gijon) causes an accident with Sasha (Muccino), who's just left a communal home for the families of drug addicts. Despite the circumstances of their meeting, the pair become friends and Sasha seeks Nicole's help in pursuing his love interest, Benedetta (Crescentini). Despite her beauty, Benedetta is the spoiled daughter of Sasha's patron, Riccardo (Colangeli). She appears to spend much of her time abusing alcohol, surrounded by like-minded rich youth that also delve into cocaine.

Sasha is then approached by a former acquaintance, former addict, Fabrizio (Mazzotta) who is looking for money to participate in an upcoming poker game. Sasha decides to get involved in the game himself. He scores big and adapts to the gambler's lifestyle, gaining respect from Benedetta's spoiled friends. Meanwhile Nicole's life continues to unravel, racked by feelings of guilt over the death of her former lover ten years earlier. She even visit's the forgiving mother (Chaplin) of her former lover. She also looks for escape from her passionless marriage and looks towards Sasha.

== Cast ==
- Silvio Muccino as Sasha
- Aitana Sánchez-Gijón as Nicole
- Carolina Crescentini as Benedetta
- Geraldine Chaplin as Amelie
- Giorgio Colangeli as Riccardo
- Niccolò Senni as Giacomo
- Flavio Parenti as Tancredi
- Max Mazzotta as Fabrizio
- Andrea Renzi as Lorenzo
- Giorgio Sgobbi as Architetto

== Reception ==
The film debuted at no. 1 on the Italian box office. It had grossed over $11. 5 million by the end of March 2008.

=== Awards ===
- David di Donatello for David of the Youth
- Nastro d'Argento for Best Cinematography

=== Nominations ===
- David di Donatello for Best Cinematography
- David di Donatello for Best Costumes
- David di Donatello for Best Score
- David di Donatello for Best New Director
- David di Donatello for Best Supporting Actress
- Nastro d'Argento for Best New Director
- Nastro d'Argento for Best Producer
- Nastro d'Argento Best Production Design

== See also ==
- List of Italian films of 2008
- List of Spanish films of 2009
