= Mr. Happiness =

- Italian: Mister Felicità
- Directed by: Alessandro Siani
- Screenplay by: Alessandro Siani; Fabio Bonifacci
- Starring: Alessandro Siani; Diego Abatantuono; Carla Signoris; Elena Cucci; Cristiana Dell'Anna
- Music by: Umberto Scipione
- Distributed by: 01 Distribution
- Release date: 1 January 2017
- Running time: 90 minutes
- Country: Italy
- Language: Italian
- Box office: US$10.5 million

Mr. Happiness (Italian: Mister Felicità) is a 2017 Italian comedy film directed by Alessandro Siani and starring Siani, Diego Abatantuono and Carla Signoris. It was released in Italy by 01 Distribution on 1 January 2017.

== Plot ==
Martino is a lazy young Neapolitan who lives in Switzerland at his sister's place. When she suffers an accident, he has to replace her in at work as a cleaning lady.

Martino cleans the office of a psychologist and mental coach and one day, when the doctor is absent, he decides to try to replace him, assuming the name "Mr. Happiness". So Martino meets a doctor's patient, Caterina (a high level ice skater facing a performance drop) and falls in love with her, even though she has relationship problems with her strict mother.

== Cast ==
- Alessandro Siani as Martino
- Diego Abatantuono as Guglielmo Gioia
- Carla Signoris as Augusta
- Elena Cucci as Arianna Crof
- Cristiana Dell'Anna as Caterina De Simone
- Yari Gugliucci as Procolo
- David Zed as the team coach
- Ernesto Mahieux as the team president

== Reception ==
The film was number two on its opening weekend in Italy, with US$1.98 million. It was number-one on its second weekend, with US$3.35 million.
