= Elisabetta Canalis =

Italian actress, singer and showgirl

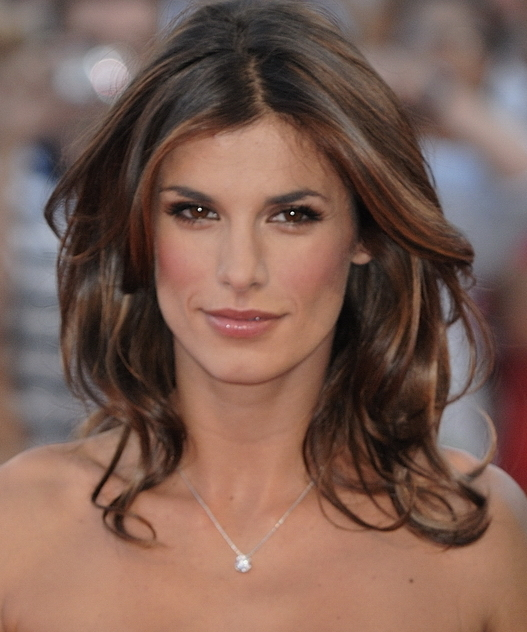
- Canalis at the 2009 Venice Film Festival
- Born: 12 September 1978 (age 48); Sassari, Italy
- Occupations: Television personality; actress
- Years active: 1999–present
- Spouse: Brian Perri (m. 2014)
- Children: 1
- Website: elisabettacanalis.it

Elisabetta Canalis (Italian: [elizaˈbɛtta kaˈnaːlis]; born 12 September 1978) is an Italian actress and television personality.

== Early life ==
Elisabetta Canalis was born in Sassari, Sardinia, in Italy. Her father, Cesare, is a clinical radiologist at the University of Sassari, and her mother, Bruna, was a teacher. She has a brother named Luigi, also a radiologist, who was involved in a Switzerland debt scandal.

Canalis was educated at Sassari's "classical" high school (liceo classico). She went on to study foreign languages at the University of Milan, but she quit her course without graduating at the age of twenty-one in order to work as a dancer for Silvio Berlusconi's TV channel Canale 5.

== Career ==
=== Acting and presenting ===
Elisabetta Canalis was a dancer on the Canale 5 TV show Striscia la notizia from 1999 to 2002. Canalis had minor roles in the films Deuce Bigalow: European Gigolo and Virgin Territory, a comedy produced by Roberto Cavalli. In 2005, she replaced a busy Michelle Hunziker in Love Bugs 2, the second season of the sitcom Love Bugs. In 2007, she co-hosted the annual Italian music festival, Festivalbar but the TV program closed. In 2009, she replaced a pregnant Elena Santarelli on the Italian version of Total Request Live, on MTV Italia. Elisabetta hosted the Trofeo Birra Moretti 2008, a summer football competition played between S.S.C. Napoli, A.C. Milan and Juventus.

In 2010, she played a recurring character in season 3 of the TNT series Leverage. In February 2011, she co-hosted the most important Italian song contest, Sanremo Music Festival with Gianni Morandi and Belen Rodriguez, during which she interviewed Robert De Niro . Canalis appeared on the 13th season of Dancing with the Stars. She was paired with Valentin Chmerkovskiy and was the second to be eliminated on 27 September 2011. She was interviewed on The Ellen DeGeneres Show in September 2011. She posed for PETA's "I'd Rather Go Naked than Wear Fur" campaign in 2011. For two nights, she co-hosted for the second time the Sanremo Music Festival 2012 and acted with the singer Adriano Celentano in the role of "Messy Italia".

In March 2015, she was appointed Goodwill Ambassador UNICEF Italy.

Canalis returned to acting for the 2024 Gianluca Ansanelli film Come far litigare mamma e papà.

=== Modeling ===
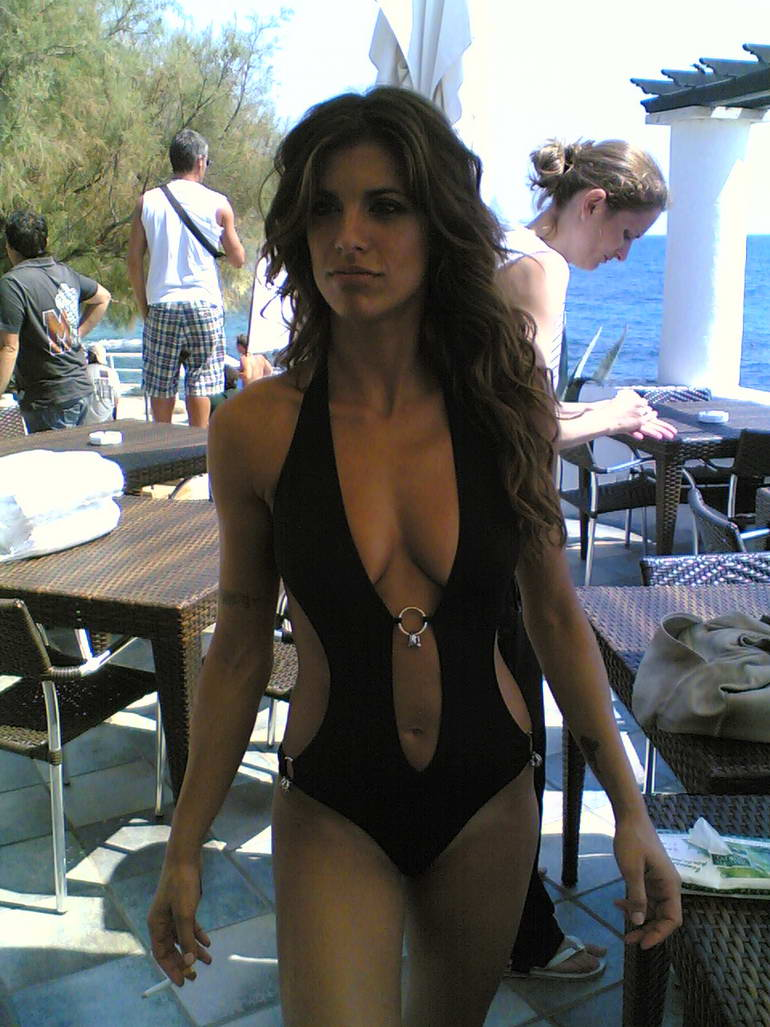
Canalis in 2007

Canalis was featured in the 2003 Max nude calendar. She has been a spokeswoman and runway model from 2006 to 2009 for the fashion brand "Hollywood Milano", a Milan-based disco club. She promoted in a spot recorded in New York the new city limousine Musa "5th Avenue". In June 2011 she appeared in a photoshoot of the Spanish version of Vogue, and in September 2011 in the Arabian version of Harper's Bazaar. That same year, she modeled for Roberto Cavalli.

Canalis was June 2010 cover girl for the third time on Vanity Fair. In the same year, she is, for the Italian version of Vanity Fair, the 4th woman most beautiful in 2010. She has been also on 2010 the 7th most beautiful woman for Maxim and in top 50 for DT Spain magazine. Thanks to Clooney, she gained a contract as spokesmodel for Pantene. In The Netherlands, she is a spokesperson for Auping. She was the covergirl for a June 2012 edition of Sportweek Dreams, a special edition of La Gazzetta dello Sport. The shoot was in Santo Domingo. She appeared in a July 2012 advertisement for PETA. For Milano Fashion Week that year she modeled on the runway for Philipp Plein and for the new collection of Miss Bikini. On 2016 she became testimonial for the sportwear brand DEHA.

== Personal life ==
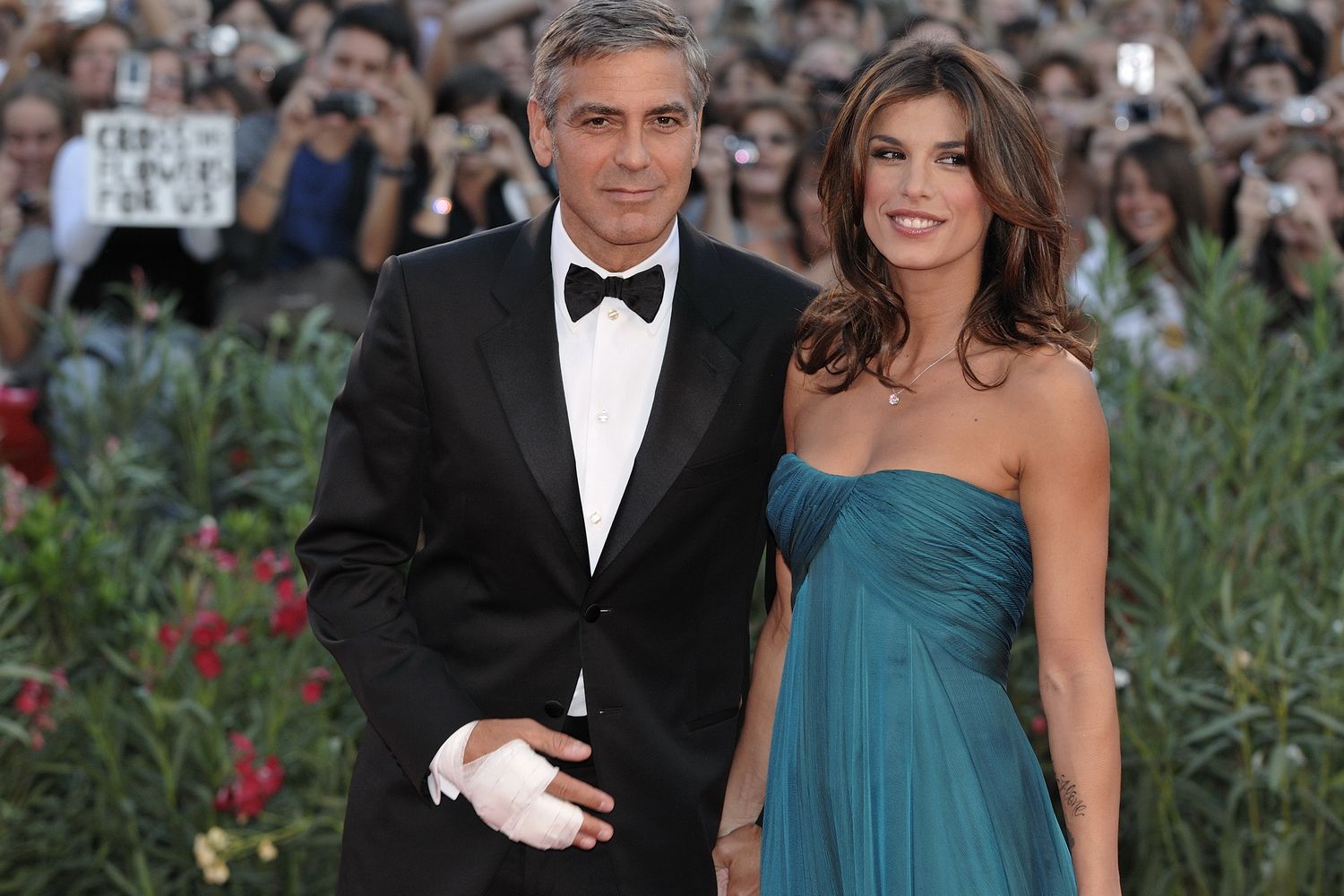
Canalis with George Clooney at 66th Venice International Film Festival (2009)

Canalis was previously engaged to footballer Christian Vieri, and she also had a short relationship with film director Gabriele Muccino following his divorce. Canalis subsequently had a short relationship with football player Reginaldo.

Canalis dated American actor George Clooney for two years before breaking up in June 2011. On 23 November 2011, Canalis and Clooney were among 200 witnesses accepted by a Milan court in the trial of former Italian Prime Minister Silvio Berlusconi for allegedly paying for sex with an underage prostitute, a scandal dubbed "Rubygate".

Canalis married American orthopedic surgeon Brian Perri on 14 September 2014 in Alghero, Sardinia. During the wedding, Italian singer Bianca Atzei sang the traditional Sardinian song Ave Maria. On 29 September 2015, Canalis gave birth to their daughter, Skyler Eva. In July 2023, Canalis said that she and Perri were separated pending a divorce, and that she was romantically involved with Romanian kickboxer Georgian Cimpeanu.

== Filmography ==
Films
Year	Title	Role	Notes
2005	Deuce Bigalow: European Gigolo	Castle lady	Cameo appearance
2006	Natale a New York	Carlotta Ferri	
2007	Virgin Territory	Sister Gabriella	
2008	La seconda volta non si scorda mai	Ilaria Fiorito	
2008	La fidanzata di papà	Felicity	
2010	A Natale mi sposo	Paloma	
2024	Come far litigare mamma e papà	Amalia	

Television
Year	Title	Role	Notes
2003–04	Carabinieri	Alessandra Ferri	Main role; 48 episodes
2005	Love Bugs	Elisabetta	Main role (season 2)
2007	Buona la prima!	Herself	Episode: "Non c'è 2 senza trendy"
2008	Medici miei	Vittoria Colombini	Main role; 11 episodes
2010	Fratelli Benvenuti	Krishna	Recurring role; 6 episodes
2010	Leverage	Mystery Woman	Recurring role; 5 episodes
2014	Party On	Party guest	Episode: "Sardinia"
2018	L'isola di Pietro	Giulia Canale	Main role (season 2); 6 episodes
