= Tonino Zangardi =

Italian director and screenwriter (1957–2018)

- Born: Antonio Zangardi; 23 April 1957; Rome, Italy
- Died: 19 February 2018 (aged 60); Rome, Italy
- Occupation(s): Director, Screenwriter
- Years active: 1992–2018

Tonino Zangardi (born Antonio Zangardi, 23 April 1957 – 19 February 2018) was an Italian director and screenwriter.

== Biography ==
Born in Rome in 1957, Zangardi directed his first feature film Allullo drom - L'anima zingara, starring Isabella Ferrari, in 1992, telling a story of a gipsy community in Tuscany. His fourth film Prendimi e portami via, starring Valeria Golino, dealt as well with the Romani community.

In 2008, his thriller film Sandrine in the Rain, starring Sara Forestier and Adriano Giannini, premiered at the Busan International Film Festival.

In 2017, Zangardi founded in Mantua the Master Film Academy, where he taught directing techniques.

=== Death ===
He died in Rome on 19 February 2018, at the age of 60, after a long illness.

== Filmography ==
- Allullo drom - L'anima zingara (1992)
- Un altro giorno ancora (1995)
- L'ultimo mundial (1999)
- Prendimi e portami via (2003)
- Ma l'amore... sì! (2006)
- Sandrine in the Rain (2008)
- L'esigenza di unirmi ogni volta con te (2015)
- My Father Jack (2016)
- Quando corre Nuvolari (2018)
