= Benvenuti al Nord =

- Directed by: Luca Miniero
- Written by: Luca Miniero, Fabio Bonifacci (from Dany Boon)
- Produced by: Riccardo Tozzi
- Starring: Claudio Bisio; Alessandro Siani; Angela Finocchiaro; Valentina Lodovini
- Music by: Umberto Scipione
- Distributed by: Medusa Film
- Release date: 18 January 2012
- Running time: 110 minutes
- Country: Italy
- Languages: Italian, Neapolitan and Northern dialect, French

Benvenuti al Nord (eng: "Welcome to the North") is a 2012 Italian comedy film directed by Luca Miniero.

It is the sequel of the high-grossing film Benvenuti al Sud. It was a commercial success, earning more than 27 million euros during its Italian theatrical release; it had the third best opening in Italian market history.

== Plot ==
While Alberto is back in his beloved northern Italy in Milan, his friend Mattia is still in Naples with his friends. He has problems with his wife Maria, because she wants him to take his postal job seriously, now that the two have a son to look after. Then after a dispute, Mattia decides to transfer to northern Italy, in the town of Pordenone. Mattia appears to be willing to leave his little town, but as soon as the transfer comes through, he begins to despair. Many locals offer their opinions; his wise old mother tells him that the people in northern Italy are terribly cold and cruel.

Mattia is slightly reassured and in the blink of an eye is in Milan, a whole new world for him as a citizen of the South. Alberto welcomes him very coldly because he is in big trouble. The director of Milan's largest postal company intends to provide Italy with a whole new economic plan from Japan to modify the postal service. Mattia starts working in the post office where Alberto is the deputy director, but he soon realizes how different the local mentality is: people are not like that back home.

Much like Benvenuti al Sud, this film ironically jokes about the differences and diversity from the South to the North of Italy, occasionally challenging and often confirming these stereotypes.

== Cast ==
- Claudio Bisio as Alberto Colombo
- Alessandro Siani as Mattia Volpe
- Angela Finocchiaro as Silvia Colombo/Erminia, her mother
- Valentina Lodovini as Maria Flagello
- Nando Paone as Costabile Piccolo (Little Constable)
- Nunzia Schiano as Mattia's mother
- Salvatore Misticone as Scapece
- Teco Celio as the Lega Nord supporter
- Paolo Rossi as Palmisan
- Giacomo Rizzo as Costabile Grande (Big Constable)
- Fulvio Falzarano as Mario "Ciaparatt"
- Gianmarco Pozzoli as the blind man/disabled man/hunchback
- Katia Follesa as the taxi driver
- Giuseppe Pirozzi as Edinson
- Ippolita Baldini as Dodi
- Francesco Brandi as Sandrino
- Francesco Migliaccio as Comisoni
- Alessandro Vighi as Chicco
- Carlo Giuseppe Gabardini as the barman
- Maria Bolignano as Mattia's neighbour
- Camilla Diana as the girl at the disco
- Stella Maris as Alberto's neighbour
- Daniela Gervasi as the aperitif girl
- Hu Jinyue as the greengrocer
- Sara Laura Lorenzetti as the Duomo dancer
- Emma Marrone as herself
