= Claudio Bisio =

Italian actor and comedian

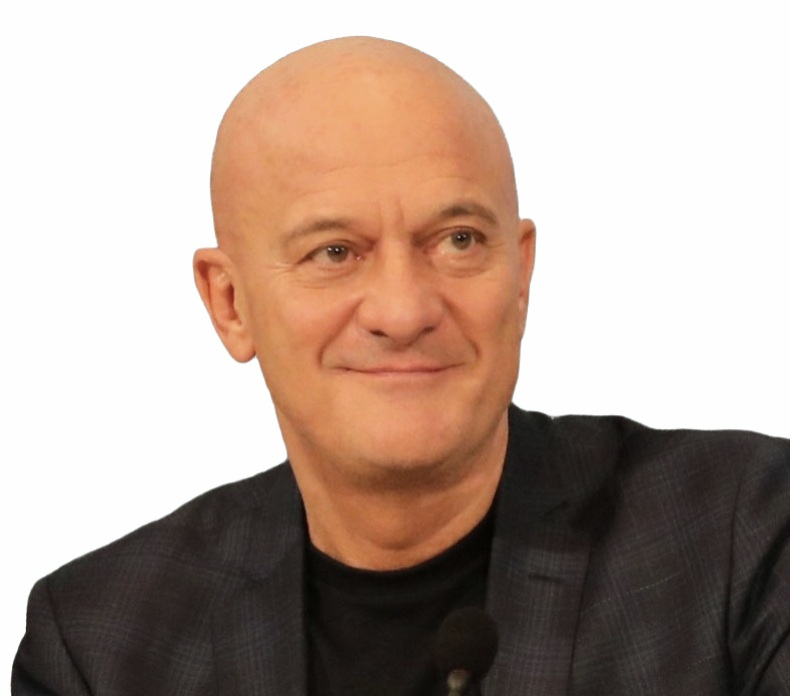
- Bisio in 2019
- Born: Claudio Giuseppe Bisio; 19 March 1957 (age 69); Novi Ligure, Italy
- Occupations: Actor; comedian; television presenter
- Years active: 1983–present
- Political party: Workers Vanguard (1970s–1978)
- Spouse: Sandra Bonzi (m. 2003)
- Children: 2

Claudio Giuseppe Bisio (Italian pronunciation: [ˈklaudjo ˈbiːzjo]; born 19 March 1957) is an Italian actor, voice actor, comedian, and television presenter.

== Early life ==
Bisio was born in Novi Ligure, Piedmont, and raised in Milan, Lombardy. He attended scientific lyceum Luigi Cremona of Milan and graduated from drama school of Piccolo Teatro of Milan.

== Career ==
Bisio started his career as theatre actor performing classical and modern drama; he began his movie career in 1983 with Come dire... (How to say). His first major appearance on TV was in 1998 during Zanzibar, an Italian TV show. He has been the presenter of Zelig, an Italian sketch comedy, for 13 years (in 1997 and from 2000 to 2012).

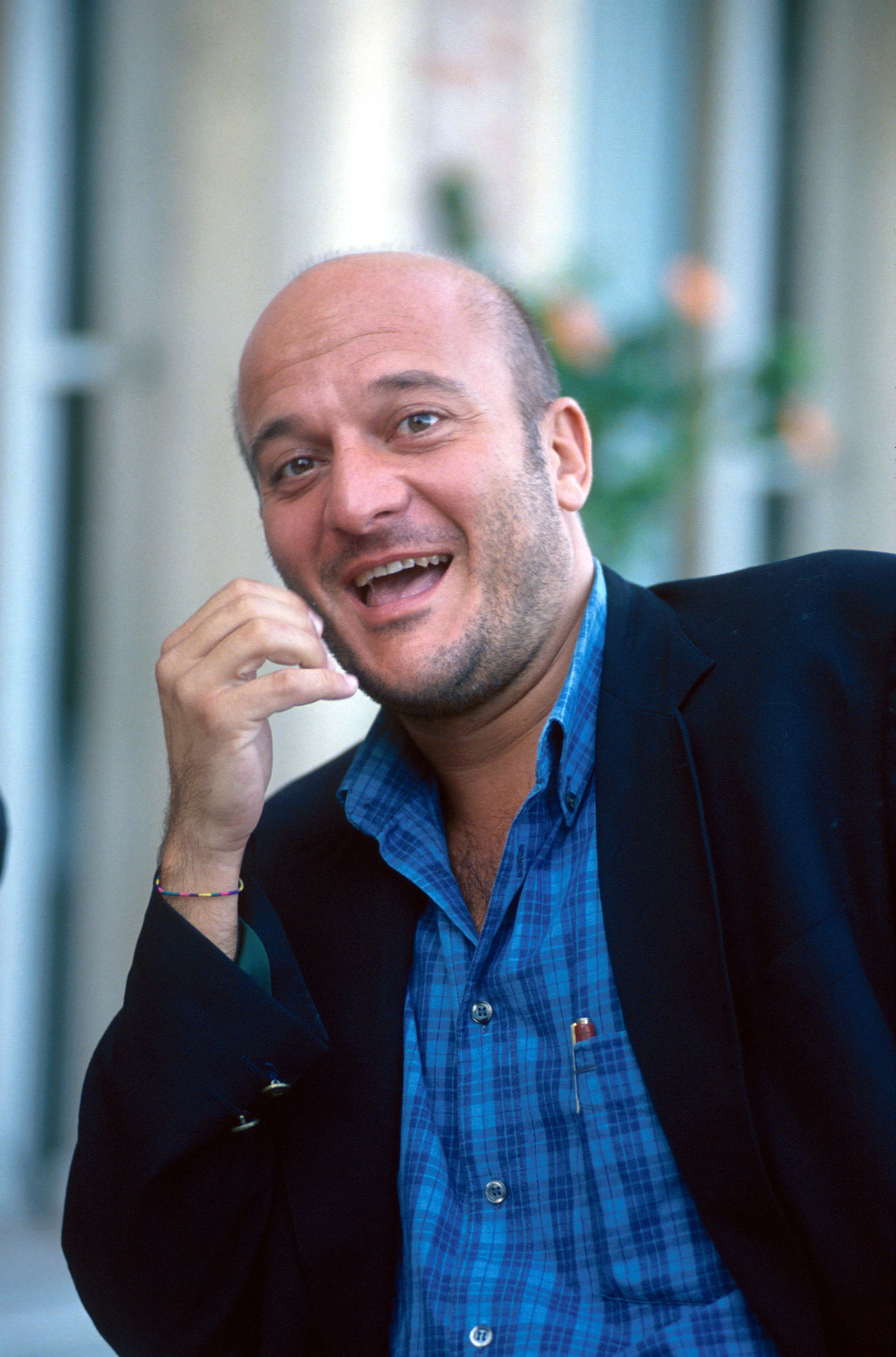
Bisio in 1991

In 2009, he played in Ex and gained a David di Donatello nomination for best supporting actor. In 2010 he was the protagonist of Benvenuti al Sud (Welcome to the South) and Maschi contro femmine (Males vs Females) and in 2011 of Benvenuti al Nord (Welcome to the North) and Femmine contro maschi (Females vs Males).

In the Italian version of the Ice Age series, Bisio is the voice of Sid (one of the protagonists of the film). He is also the voice of Count Dracula in the Italian version of Hotel Transylvania.

In the summer of 2014 has been announced he will be part of Italia's Got Talent jury for its sixth series, aired in 2015 by the pay-TV Sky Uno.

== Personal life ==
Bisio is married to Sandra Bonzi. He has two children, Alice and Federico.

He is an atheist.

== Filmography ==
=== Film ===
Year	Title	Role	Notes
1983	Dream of a Summer Night	Moth	
1984	Domani mi sposo	Wolmer	
1985	Madman at War	Lieutenant Pintus	
1987	The Rogues	Chief of the Slaves	
1987	The Strangeness of Life	Patient #1	Cameo appearance
1987	Kamikazen: Last Night in Milan	Vincenzo Amato	
1987	Topo Galileo	460	
1988	The Camels	Attendant	Cameo appearance
1990	On Tour	Tank Man	Cameo appearance
1991	Mediterraneo	Corrado Noventa	
1992	Puerto Escondido	Alex	
1993	Bonus Malus	Baldini	
1993	Sud	Giacomo Fiori	
1994	Dietro la pianura	Antonio	
1996	Albergo Roma	Danilo Giorgini	
1996	Bits and Pieces	Various	
1997	Nirvana	Corvo Rosso	
1997	The Truce	Ferrari	
1999	Asini	Italo	
2001	Atlantis: The Lost Empire	Gaetan "Mole" Molière (voice)	Italian voice
2002	Ice Age	Sid (voice)	Italian voice
2004	Terkel in Trouble	Leon (voice)	Italian voice
2006	The Bodyguard's Cure	Sandrone	
2006	Ice Age: The Meltdown	Sid (voice)	Italian voice
2006	Natale a New York	Severino Benci	
2007	Manual of Love 2	DJ Fulvio	
2008	Love, Soccer and Other Catastrophes	Vittorio Trebbi	
2008	We Can Do That	Nello	
2009	Ice Age: Dawn of the Dinosaurs	Sid (voice)	Italian voice
2009	Many Kisses Later	Sergio	
2009	I mostri oggi	Various	
2010	Benvenuti al Sud	Alberto Colombo	
2010	Men vs. Women	Marcello	
2011	Women vs. Men	Marcello	
2011	Bar Sport	Eros	
2012	Benvenuti al Nord	Alberto Colombo	
2012	Ice Age: Continental Drift	Sid (voice)	Italian voice
2012	Hotel Transylvania	Dracula (voice)	Italian voice
2012	Ernest & Celestine	Ernest (voice)	Italian voice
2013	Welcome Mr. President	Giuseppe Garibaldi	
2013	Guess Who's Coming for Christmas?	Domenico	
2014	People Who Are Well	Umberto Durloni	
2014	Happily Mixed Up	Marcello	
2015	Animal Kingdom: Let's Go Ape	Ian (voice)	Italian voice
2015	What a Beautiful Surprise	Guido	
2015	Hotel Transylvania 2	Dracula (voice)	Italian voice
2016	Ice Age: Collision Course	Sid (voice)	Italian voice
2016	Non c'è più religione	Cecco	
2017	Couch Potatoes	Giorgio Selva	
2018	Arrivano i prof	Mario Locuratolo	
2018	Hotel Transylvania 3: Summer Vacation	Dracula (voice)	Italian voice
2019	Beware the Gorilla	Peppe the Gorilla	Voice
2019	Welcome Back Mr. President	Giuseppe Garibaldi	
2019	Se mi vuoi bene	Diego	
2021	Mollo tutto e apro un chiringuito	Boss	
2022	The Ice Age Adventures of Buck Wild	Sid (voice)	Italian voice
2022	Hotel Transylvania: Transformania	Dracula (voice)	Italian voice
2022	Vicini di casa	Giulio	
2022	Ernest & Celestine: A Trip to Gibberitia	Ernest (voice)	Italian voice
2023	Io, noi e Gaber	Himself	Docu-film
2023	L'ultima volta che siamo stati bambini	Anacleto Barocci	Also director
2024	Una terapia di gruppo	Federico	
2027	Ice Age: Boiling Point †	Sid (voice)	Italian voice
TBA	Bentornati al Sud †	Alberto Colombo	Filming

=== Television ===
Year	Title	Role	Notes
1988–1989	Zanzibar	Italo	Main role; 40 episodes
1990–1993	Eurocops	Giulio	Recurring role; 5 episodes
1992	Casa dolce casa	Dr. Cipressi	Episode: "Studio cercasi"
1996–present	Zelig	Himself / Host	Variety show
1997	Un giorno fortunato	Rolando	Television movie
1997–1998	Mai dire Gol	Himself / Host	Season 8
2001	Le Iene	Himself / Co-host	Only Le Iene Show episodes
2004	Concerto del Primo Maggio	Himself / Host	Annual concert special
2005	Concerto del Primo Maggio	Himself / Host	Annual concert special
2005	Belli dentro	The Prison Warden	Episode: "Il direttore"
2006	Concerto del Primo Maggio	Himself / Host	Annual concert special
2007	Due imbroglioni e… mezzo!	Lello	Television movie
2015–2019	Italia's Got Talent	Himself / Judge	Talent show (season 6-9)
2016	Untraditional	Himself	Episode: "Un ricco spuntino"
2017	The Comedians	Claudio	Lead role; 10 episodes
2018	Saturday Night Live from Milano	Various	Cast member (season 8)
2019	Sanremo Music Festival 2019	Himself / Co-host	Annual music festival
2020–2021	Cops	Inspector Valerio Cinardi	Lead role; 4 episodes
2021	Blame Freud: The Series	Frangesco Tamarelli	Lead role; 8 episodes
2023	Vivere non è un gioco da ragazzi	Saguatti	Main role; 6 episodes
2026	Uno sbirro in Appennino	Vasco Benassi	Lead role; 8 episodes

== Stage ==
- Sogno di una notte di estate, 1981 (G. Salvatores)
- Nemico di Classe (di N. Williams), 1983 (Elio De Capitani)
- Café Procope, 1985 (G. Salvatores)
- Comedians (di T. Griffiths), 1985 (G. Salvatores)
- Accidental Death of an Anarchist, 1987 (Dario Fo)
- Guglielma, 1990 (Gigio Alberti)
- Aspettando Godo, 1991 (Paola Galassi)
- Le nuove mirabolanti avventure di Walter Ego, 1993
- Tersa Repubblica, 1994–1995
- Monsieur Malaussène au théâtre (di Daniel Pennac), 1997–2001 (G. Gallione)
- La buona novella (di Fabrizio De André), 2000–2001 (G. Gallione)
- Appunti di viaggio, 2002 (G. Gallione)
- I bambini sono di sinistra, 2003 (G. Gallione)
- Grazie (di Daniel Pennac), 2005 (G. Gallione)
- Coèsi se vi pare (with Elio e le Storie Tese), 2006

== Bibliography ==
- Quella vacca di Nonna Papera 1993.
- Prima comunella poi comunismo 1996. ISBN 88-8490-185-5.
- I bambini sono di sinistra 2005
- Doppio misto. Autobiografia di coppia non-autorizzata 2008

== Discography ==
- Paté d'animo (1991)
