= The Unlikely Prince =

- Film poster
- Italian: Il principe abusivo
- Directed by: Alessandro Siani
- Written by: Fabio Bonifacci; Alessandro Siani
- Starring: Alessandro Siani; Christian De Sica; Sarah Felberbaum; Serena Autieri
- Cinematography: Paolo Carnera
- Edited by: Valentina Mariani
- Music by: Umberto Scipione
- Release date: 14 February 2013
- Running time: 97 minutes
- Country: Italy
- Language: Italian

The Unlikely Prince (Italian: Il principe abusivo) is a 2013 Italian comedy film directed by Alessandro Siani.

== Cast ==
- Alessandro Siani as Antonio De Biase
- Christian De Sica as Anastasio "Ciambellone"
- Sarah Felberbaum as Princess Letizia
- Serena Autieri as Jessica Quagliarulo
- Lello Musella as Pino
- Marco Messeri as the King
- Alan Cappelli Goetz as Prince Gherets of Belgium
- Salvatore Misticone as Professor Ruotolo
- Nello Iorio as Ciro
- Gisella Sofio as the old Countess
- Sergio Graziani as the old Count
- Aldo Bufi Landi as the old barman
- Clara Bindi as the old barwoman
