= Alessandro Siani =

Italian comedian and actor (born 1975)

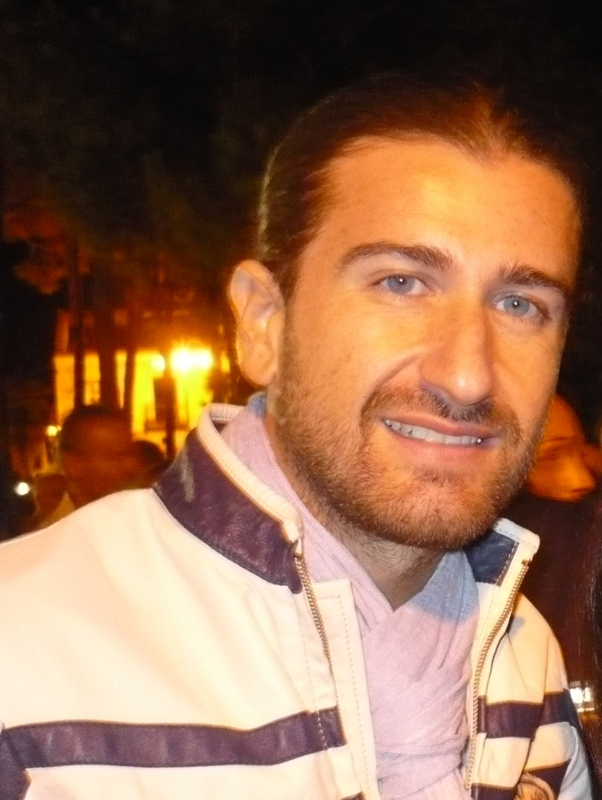
- Siani in 2010
- Born: Alessandro Esposito; 17 September 1975 (age 50); Naples, Italy
- Occupations: Stand-up comedian; actor; film producer; filmmaker; screenwriter; author; television personality
- Height: 1.78 m (5 ft 10 in)

Alessandro Esposito (born 17 September 1975), known professionally as Alessandro Siani, is an Italian actor, director, screenwriter and stand-up comedian.

== Life and career ==
Born in Naples, Siani formed at the Tunnel Cabaret's acting laboratory in his hometown. In 1995, shortly after having won the "Charlot Prize" as best comedian, he decided to adopt the stage name Siani in honour of the journalist and camorra victim Giancarlo Siani. After being part of the comedy trio "A Testa in giù" and after having appeared in a number of variety shows, he got his first success in 2004 as a stand-up comedian with the stage show Fiesta.

Siani made his film debut in 2006 in the romantic comedy Ti lascio perché ti amo troppo, and following a few other roles he had his breakout in 2010 with the box office hit Benvenuti al Sud, which also got him a nomination for David di Donatello for Best Supporting Actor. In 2013 he debuted as director with The Unlikely Prince.

In 2025, he was a judge on the RAI programme Tale e quale show, the Italian adaptation of Your Face Sounds Familiar.

== Filmography ==
=== Director ===
- The Unlikely Prince (2013)
- Si accettano miracoli (2015)
- Mr. Happiness (2017)
- The Most Beautiful Day in the World (2019)
- Who Framed Santa Claus? (2021)
- Needing a Friend? (2023)
- Big Family (2024)
- Io e te dobbiamo parlare (2024)

=== Actor ===
- Ti lascio perché ti amo troppo (2006)
- Natale a New York (2006)
- Natale in crociera (2007)
- La seconda volta non si scorda mai (2008)
- Benvenuti al Sud (2010)
- The Worst Week of My Life (2011)
- Benvenuti al Nord (2012) (actor)
- The Unlikely Prince (2013)
- Si accettano miracoli (2015)
- Mr. Happiness (2017)
- The Most Beautiful Day in the World (2019)
- Who Framed Santa Claus? (2021)
- Needing a Friend? (2023)
- Big Family (2024)
- Io e te dobbiamo parlare (2024)

== Producer ==
- Troppo Napoletano (2016) (producer)

== Literary works ==
- 2010 - Un napoletano come me...e che t'o dico a fà!, Rizzoli (100k copies sold)
- 2013 - Non si direbbe che sei napoletano, Mondadori (Best Seller)
- 2013 - L'Italia abusiva. Viaggio comico in un paese diversamente autorizzato (Best Seller)
- 2015 - Troppo napoletano, Mondadori
- 2019 - Napolitudine. Dialoghi sulla vita, la felicità e la smania 'e turnà, with Luciano De Crescenzo, Milano, Mondadori. ISBN 978-88-04-68505-0. (Ranked for over ten weeks)
