= 49th David di Donatello =

2004 Italian film awards

- Date: 14 April 2004
- Site: Palazzo dei Congressi, Rome
- Hosted by: Pippo Baudo

Highlights
- Best Picture: The Best of Youth
- Most awards: The Best of Youth (6)
- Most nominations: What Will Happen to Us (12)

Television coverage
- Network: Rai 1

The 49th David di Donatello ceremony, presented by the Accademia del Cinema Italiano, was held on 14 April 2004.

== Winners and nominees ==
Best Film: The Best of Youth, directed by Marco Tullio Giordana; Good Morning, Night, directed by Marco Bellocchio; What Will Happen to Us, directed by Giovanni Veronesi; I'm Not Scared, directed by Gabriele Salvatores; Don't Move, directed by Sergio Castellitto	Best Producer: Angelo Barbagallo – The Best of Youth; Luigi Musini, Roberto Cicutto – Singing Behind Screens; Aurelio De Laurentiis – What Will Happen to Us; Riccardo Tozzi, Giovanni Stabilini, Marco Chimenz – Don't Move; Domenico Procacci – First Love
Best Director: Marco Tullio Giordana – The Best of Youth; Pupi Avati – Christmas Rematch; Marco Bellocchio – Good Morning, Night; Sergio Castellitto – Don't Move; Matteo Garrone – First Love	Best New Director: Salvatore Mereu – Three-Step Dance; Andrea Manni – The Fugitive; Francesco Patierno – Pater Familias; Piero Sanna – La destinazione; Maria Sole Tognazzi – Past Perfect
Best Actor: Sergio Castellitto – Don't Move; Giuseppe Battiston – Agata and the Storm; Luigi Lo Cascio – The Best of Youth; Silvio Muccino – What Will Happen to Us; Carlo Verdone – Love Is Eternal While It Lasts	Best Actress: Penélope Cruz – Don't Move; Michela Cescon – First Love; Licia Maglietta – Agata and the Storm; Violante Placido – What Will Happen to Us; Maya Sansa – Good Morning, Night
Best Supporting Actor: Roberto Herlitzka – Good Morning, Night; Diego Abatantuono – I'm Not Scared; Elio Germano – What Will Happen to Us; Fabrizio Gifuni – The Best of Youth; Emilio Solfrizzi – Agata and the Storm	Best Supporting Actress: Margherita Buy – Caterina in the Big City; Anna Maria Barbera – Suddenly Paradise; Claudia Gerini – Don't Move; Jasmine Trinca – The Best of Youth; Giselda Volodi – Agata and the Storm
David di Donatello for Best Screenplay: Sandro Petraglia, Stefano Rulli – The Best of Youth; Marco Bellocchio – Good Morning, Night; Francesco Bruni, Paolo Virzì – Caterina in the Big City; Giovanni Veronesi, Silvio Muccino – What Will Happen to Us; Margaret Mazzantini, Sergio Castellitto – Don't Move	Best Cinematography: Italo Petriccione – I'm Not Scared; Danilo Desideri – Love Is Eternal While It Lasts; Fabio Olmi – Singing Behind Screens; Marco Onorato – First Love; Fabio Zamarion – What Will Happen to Us
Best Production Design: Luigi Marchione – Singing Behind Screens; Paola Bizzarri – Agata and the Storm; Franco Ceraolo – The Best of Youth; Marco Dentici – What Will Happen to Us; Francesco Frigeri – Don't Move	Best Score: Banda Osiris – First Love; Ezio Bosso – I'm Not Scared; Andrea Guerra – What Will Happen to Us; Riz Ortolani – Christmas Rematch; Giovanni Venosta – Agata and the Storm
Best Editing: Roberto Missiroli – The Best of Youth; Francesca Calvelli – Good Morning, Night; Claudio Di Mauro – What Will Happen to Us; Patrizio Marone – Don't Move; Jacopo Quadri – The Dreamers	Best Sound: Fulgenzio Ceccon – The Best of Youth; Gaetano Carito – Good Morning, Night; Mario Iaquone – Don't Move; Mauro Lazzaro – I'm Not Scared; Miguel Polo – What Will Happen to Us
Best Costumes: Francesca Sartori – Singing Behind Screens; Gemma Mascagni – What Will Happen to Us; Elisabetta Montaldo – The Best of Youth; Silvia Nebiolo – Agata and the Storm; Isabella Rizza – Don't Move	Best Special Visual Effects: Ubik Visual Effects – Boss Film – Singing Behind Screens; Proxima – Agata and the Storm; Digitrace Tech – L'apetta Giulia e la Signora Vita; Sergio Stivaletti – È già ieri; LCD – Opopomoz; Chinatown – Totò Sapore e la magica storia della pizza
Best Documentary Feature: War, directed by Pippo Delbono; A scuola, directed by Leonardo Di Costanzo; L'esplosione, directed by Giovanni Piperno; Padre Pio Express, directed by Ilaria Freccia; Segni particolari: appunti per un film sull'Emilia–Romagna, directed by Giuseppe Bertolucci; L'uomo segreto, directed by Nino Bizzarri	Best Short Film: Sole, directed by Michele Carrillo (ex aequo); Zinanà, directed by Pippo Mezzapesa (ex aequo); Aspettando il treno, directed by Catherine McGilvray; Interno 9, directed by Davide Del Degan; Un amore possibile, directed by Amanda Sandrelli
Best European Film: Dogville, directed by Lars von Trier (ex aequo); Rosenstrasse, directed by Margarethe von Trotta (ex aequo); Good Bye, Lenin!, directed by Wolfgang Becker; Mondays in the Sun, directed by Fernando León de Aranoa; Girl with a Pearl Earring, directed by Peter Webber	Best Foreign Film: The Barbarian Invasions, directed by Denys Arcand; Big Fish, directed by Tim Burton; Lost in Translation, directed by Sofia Coppola; Master and Commander: The Far Side of the World, directed by Peter Weir; Mystic River, directed by Clint Eastwood
David Youth Award: I'm Not Scared, directed by Gabriele Salvatores	Special David Awards: Goffredo Lombardo; Steven Spielberg; Peter Falk
