= Tommaso Ragno =

Italian actor (born 1967)

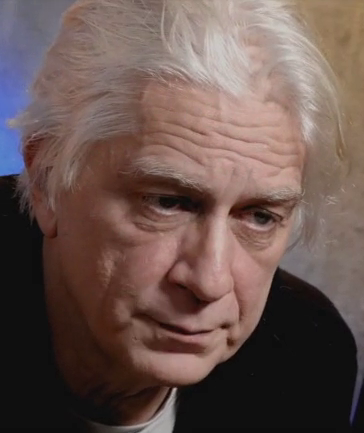
- Born: 1 June 1967 (age 59); Vieste, Apulia, Italy
- Education: Paolo Grassi School of Dramatic Art
- Occupation: Actor
- Years active: 1988–present
- Height: 1.80 m (5 ft 11 in)

Tommaso Ragno (born 1 June 1967) is an Italian stage and film actor.

== Biography ==
=== Early life and education ===
Tommaso Ragno was born on 1 June 1967 in Vieste, a coastal town in the province of Foggia, as the eldest of two children. His family, mainly from Apulia and on the grand-maternal side from ex-Yugoslavia, moved to Piacenza when he was two years old. Always having been very introverted, he spent a lot of time in solitude reading books and studying literature, planning on becoming a writer. However, later he went on to study acting at the Paolo Grassi School of Dramatic Art in Milan.

After having spent a part of his life living in Berlin, Ragno currently resides in Rome, where he also spent the pandemic lockdown.

=== Stage and film career ===
In 1988, he debuted as a stage actor in the Greek tragedy La seconda generazione, a collection of pieces by Aeschylus, Sophocles and Euripides directed by Mario Martone. Since the 1990s, he has worked repeatedly with Carlo Checci, whom he calls his "greatest teacher".

He made his film debut in 1997, starring in We All Fall Down by Davide Ferrario. In 2001 he was the lead in Chimera, directed by Pappi Corsicato, and in 2007, alongside Isabelle Huppert, in Medea Miracle by Tonino De Berdani. He also starred in The Council of Egypt (2002), L'uomo privato (2007), Me and You (2012), Like Crazy (2016) and Bloody Richard (2017).

In 2018, he starred in Happy as Lazzaro, directed by Alice Rohrwacher, who won the Award for the best Screenplay for it at the Cannes Film Festival as well as the American National Board of Review's Best Foreign Language Film Award. In his role as the grown-up Tancredi, Ragno has been nominated at the CinEuphoria Awards for Best Ensemble - International Competition. Other notable works he starred in include Nanni Moretti's Three Floors in 2021 and Paolo Virzì's Dry in 2022. directed by Paolo Virzi, both of which were shot before the pandemic. In 2022, he won the Nastro d'Argento for the Best Supporting Actor for his role in Mario Martone's Nostalgia.

=== Radio and television ===
Starting in 1998 with Più luce non basta directed by Elisabetta Lodoli, Ragno has played various roles in different television productions, establishing himself as the protagonist in the series Distretto di polizia and Il tredicesimo apostolo.

Since 2004 he has been narrating literary classics such as The Picture of Dorian Gray, Dracula, A Room with a View and Frankenstein on the program Ad alta voce on Rai Radio 3.

For his role of Marcello in the 2018 series Il miracolo, directed by Niccolò Ammaniti, he won the Flaiano Prize as well as the Golden Screen Award. In 2020, he played the Italian mafia boss Donatello Fadda in the fourth season of Fargo, written and directed by Noah Hawley.

== Filmography ==
=== Films ===
| Year | Title | Role(s) | Notes |
|---|---|---|---|
| 1997 | We All Fall Down | Lurido | |
| 2001 | Chimera | Sal | |
| 2002 | The Council of Egypt | Francesco Paolo Di Blasi | |
| 2004 | L'iguana | Don Fidenzio | |
| 2005 | Along the Ridge | Bontempo | |
| 2005 | Amatemi | Angelo | |
| 2005 | Sexum superando - Isabella Morra | Diego Sandoval | |
| 2007 | Medea Miracle | Jason | |
| 2007 | L'uomo privato | Private Man | |
| 2010 | La Passione | Stefano | |
| 2011 | Missione di pace | Colonel Cervo | |
| 2012 | Me and You | Ferdinando | |
| 2012 | Pandemia | Rino | |
| 2014 | A Golden Boy | Ludovica's husband | |
| 2014 | Mafia and Red Tomatoes | Nicola Sansone | |
| 2015 | I Killed Napoléon | Gabriele | |
| 2015 | Poli opposti | Paolo | |
| 2015 | Land of Saints | Alfredo Raso | |
| 2016 | Like Crazy | Giorgio Lorenzini | |
| 2017 | I peggiori | Durim | |
| 2017 | Bloody Richard | Edoardo | |
| 2018 | Hotel Gagarin | Franco Paradiso | |
| 2018 | Happy as Lazzaro | Adult Tancredi | |
| 2019 | Copperman | Silvano | |
| 2020 | Il buco in testa | Guido Mandeli | |
| 2020 | The Bad Poet | Giancarlo Maroni | |
| 2021 | Three Floors | Luigi | |
| 2021 | State a casa | Spatola | |
| 2021 | With or Without You | Rigoni | |
| 2021 | Security | Walter Spezi | |
| 2022 | Vetro | Father | |
| 2022 | Nostalgia | Oreste Spasiano | |
| 2022 | Burning Hearts | Michele Malatesta | |
| 2022 | Dry | Alfredo | |
| 2022 | My Soul Summer | Vins | |
| 2022 | Robbing Mussolini | Marcello Davoli | |
| 2023 | Like Sheep Among Wolves | Sante | |
| 2024 | Vermiglio | Cesare Graziadei | |
| 2024 | Sicilian Letters | Papacena | |
| 2025 | The Illusion | Giuseppe Garibaldi | |
| 2025 | Anna | Roberto Rossellini | |
| 2026 | The Fire Within You | | |

=== Television ===
| Year | Title | Role(s) | Notes |
|---|---|---|---|
| 1998 | Più leggero non basta | Paolo | Television movie |
| 2001 | Distretto di Polizia | Lorenzo | Episode: "L'altro" |
| 2003 | Un papà quasi perfetto | Music teacher | Episode: "Episodio 3" |
| 2005 | Orgoglio | Danilo Foschi | Main role (season 2) |
| 2005 | Il maresciallo Rocca | Corrado Gianni | Episode: "Il figlio di nessuno" |
| 2005 | Elisa di Rivombrosa | King Vittorio Amedeo III | Main role (season 2) |
| 2008 | RIS Delitti Imperfetti | Tullio Gibertini | Episode: "Killer in fuga" |
| 2011–2012 | Distretto di Polizia | Antonio Corallo | Main role (season 11) |
| 2012–2014 | Il tredicesimo apostolo | Bonifacio Serventi | Main role |
| 2015 | Le tre rose di Eva | Francesco Maniero | Main role (season 3) |
| 2015 | Fuoriclasse | Filippo Iaconello | Recurring role |
| 2015 | 1992 | Michele Mainaghi | Recurring role |
| 2016 | Thou Shalt Not Kill | Boris | Episode: "Episodio 11" |
| 2017 | Kommissarin Lucas | Daniele Grasso | Episode: "Familiengeheimnis" |
| 2017 | 1993 | Michele Mainaghi | 2 episodes |
| 2017–2023 | La porta rossa | Elvio Mayer | Main role |
| 2018 | The Miracle | Father Marcello | Main role |
| 2018 | Fabrizio De André – Principe libero | Riccardo Mannerini | Television movie |
| 2018–2020 | Baby | Alberto Fedeli | Main role |
| 2019 | La stagione della caccia – C'era una volta Vigata | Filippo Peluso | Television movie |
| 2019 | The Trial | Gabriele Monaco | Main role |
| 2020 | Fargo | Donatello Fadda | 2 episodes |
| 2021 | Anna | Twins father | Episode: "Ridono le iene" |
| 2021 | Luna Park | Antonio Marini | Main role |
| 2021 | Maradona: Blessed Dream | Pope John Paul II | Episode: "Libero" |
| 2022–2023 | Monterossi | Carella | Main role |
| 2024 | No Activity: Italy | Leonida De Luca | 3 episodes |
| 2025 | Imma Tataranni: Deputy Prosecutor | Vasco Parisi | Recurring role (season 4) |
| 2025 | Hotel Costiera | Augusto Caetani | Main role |
| 2026 | Portobello | Marco Pannella | Recurring role |

== Awards ==
| Year | Award | Category | Production | Status |
|---|---|---|---|---|
| 2022 | Nastro d'Argento | Best Supporting Actor | Nostalgia (2022) | Won |
| 2021 | Golden Ciak | Best Supporting Actor | Il buco in testa (2020) | Nominated |
| 2019 | CinEuphoria Awards | Best Ensemble - International Competition | Happy as Lazzaro (Lazzaro felice) (2018) | Nominated |
| 2019 | Flaiano Awards | Best interpretation Award in Theatre, Cinema and Television | The Miracle (Il Miracolo) (2018) | Won |
| 2019 | Golden Screen Awards | Best Interpretation | The Miracle (Il Miracolo) (2018) | Won |
| 2019 | Franco Enriquez Award | Best Actor | The Hunting Season (2019) | Won |
| 2018 | Series Mania | International Competition — Best Actor | The Miracle (Il Miracolo) (2018) | Won |
| 2017 | Voci Nell'Ombra | Best Audio Book Narration | The Name of the Rose by Umberto Eco | Nominated |
