= La vita intima =

2023 novel by Niccolò Ammaniti

- Author: Niccolò Ammaniti
- Language: Italian
- Genre: Fiction narrative
- Published: 2023 (Einaudi) (Italian); 2023 (Eisele Verlag) (German); 2024 (Anagrama) (Spanish)
- Publication place: Italy
- Media type: Print
- Pages: 301
- ISBN: 9788806255152
- OCLC: 1360269490

La vita intima (transl. The intimate life) is a novel by Niccolò Ammaniti.

La vita intima won the 2023 Viareggio Prize, the second time for Ammaniti 22 years after I'm Not Scared.

== Plot ==
Maria Cristina Palma seems to lead a perfect life: she is beautiful, wealthy, and famous, and the world revolves around her. One day, she receives a video on her phone that changes everything. Her past holds a secret she has yet to come to terms with.
