= Muccino =

Muccino is an Italian surname. Notable people with the surname include:

- Gabriele Muccino (born 1967), Italian film director
- Silvio Muccino (born 1982), Italian actor, film director and screenwriter
