= As God Commands (novel) =

2006 novel by Niccolò Ammaniti

- Cover of As God Commands
- Author: Niccolò Ammaniti
- Original title: Come Dio comanda
- Translator: Jonathan Hunt
- Language: Italian
- Genre: Fiction narrative
- Published: 2006 (Arnoldo Mondadori Editore) (Italian); 2009 (Black Cat) (English)
- Publication place: Italy
- Media type: Print
- Pages: 495
- ISBN: 8804502797
- OCLC: 74311261

As God Commands (Italian: Come Dio comanda), also known as The Crossroads, is a novel by Niccolò Ammaniti.

In 2008, director Gabriele Salvatores adapted the novel into a film of the same name.

== Plot ==
It tells the misadventure of Cristiano Zena, 13 year-old, and his father Rino in an Italian suburban area.

== Reception ==
The Guardian described the novel as "overexplicit" and flipping "over into the truly grotesque". The New Yorker outlined the story of the novel as "grim but redemptive". The Los Angeles Times praised the novel "as gritty as it is suspenseful".

As God Commands won the 2007 Strega Prize with 144/356 votes.
