= Volare (film) =

2019 Italian drama film

- Film poster
- Italian: Tutto il mio folle amore
- Directed by: Gabriele Salvatores
- Written by: Fulvio Ervas (story); Umberto Contarello; Sara Mosetti
- Starring: Claudio Santamaria; Valeria Golino; Diego Abatantuono; Giulio Pranno
- Cinematography: Italo Petriccione
- Edited by: Massimo Fiocchi
- Music by: Mauro Pagani
- Release dates: September 2019 (Venice); October 24, 2019
- Running time: 97 minutes
- Country: Italy
- Language: Italian

Volare (Italian: Tutto il mio folle amore, lit. 'All my crazy love') is a 2019 Italian drama film directed by Gabriele Salvatores. The film tells the true story of Franco and Andrea Antonello, a father and son with autism, who took a long motorcycle trip to South America.

The film is loosely based on the novel If I Hug You, Don't Be Afraid by Fulvio Ervas, and the film's Italian title is a reference to the song "Cosa sono le nuvole" written by Pier Paolo Pasolini and performed by Domenico Modugno.

== Plot ==
Sixteen-year-old Vincent, an autistic boy, was raised with difficulty by his mother, Elena, and her husband, Mario, who adopted him. One evening, Willy, the boy's biological father, known as the Modugno of Dalmatia, after a concert and heavily intoxicated, sneaks into Elena and Mario's house, who greets him by calling him "the shit." Awakened by his mother's screams, Vincent accidentally overhears the argument. Willy sees his son for the first time and discovers that he isn't what he imagined. Angrily, Elena chases him away.

The next morning, Vincent is missing. He had hidden under a tarp in the bed of his father's pickup truck, and his father, unaware of his presence, leaves the tour stops where he was scheduled to perform. They stop for lunch, and it turns out Vincent only wants potatoes. When his father tries to speak to him, he almost automatically replies: "Vincent Masato, born in Trieste on July 13, 2003, to Elena Masato, adopted by Mr. Mario Topoli, your name is Willy boy and you're my dad."

These words stir a breeze that moves the curtains and ignites something in Willy. Various events follow, including their car breaking down, the purchase of a motorcycle that they have an accident on, their first sexual experience, and an illegal border crossing because Vincent has no documents. During these intense days, the two learn to grow closer, establishing a strong father-son bond. Elena and Mario, desperately searching for them, find them half-asleep, cradled in inflatable chairs in a pool at a wedding party where Willy had sung.

== Cast ==
- Claudio Santamaria as Willy
- Valeria Golino as Elena Masato
- Diego Abatantuono as Mario Topoli
- Giulio Pranno as Vincent Masato
- Daniel Vivian as Dragan
- Marusa Majer as Anja
- Tania Garribba as Lorena
- Maria Gnecchi as Danja
