= Angela Baraldi =

Italian actress and singer

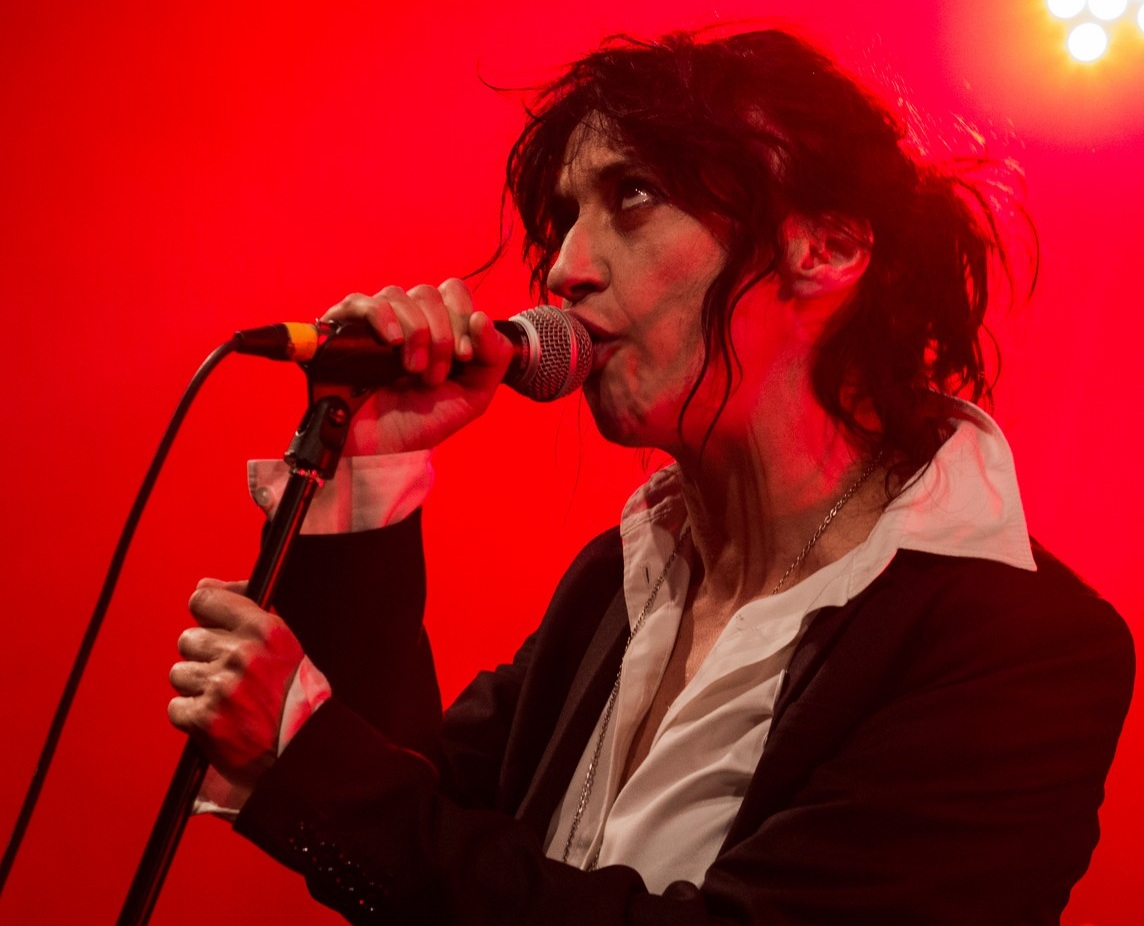
- Baraldi in 2014
- Born: 12 June 1964 (age 61); Borgo Panigale, Italy
- Occupations: Actress, singer

Angela Baraldi is an Italian actress and rock singer. She is best known for playing the lead role in the Gabriele Salvatores film and mini-series Quo Vadis, Baby?, as well as her role in the Golden Globe 1996 "Best Foreign Language"-nominated film Like Two Crocodiles.

== Biography ==
Her first musical experiences date back to the early 1980s in the Bologna underground scene.

In 1982, she sang with the Bologna band Hi-Fi Bros on the track Punto amaro, while the following year she was the female vocalist on what would be the last single by the band The Stupid Set (also from Bologna and born out of the more famous Gaznevada) entitled Don't Be Cold (In The Summer Of Love).

In the following years, she collaborated as a backing vocalist with Gianni Morandi, Lucio Dalla, Samuele Bersani, Luca Carboni, Stadio, and Ron, with whom she performed a duet in 1985 on the song Caterina.

In 1985, she starred in the music video for the famous song Chiedi chi erano i Beatles sung by Stadio and directed by Ambrogio Lo Giudice, while her collaboration with Lucio Dalla continued in 1986, participating in the American tour Dallamericaruso, as well as being portrayed in photos in the album Bugie and making a brief appearance in the video for the song Luk from the same album.

As a backing vocalist, she accompanied Gianni Morandi and Dalla on the DallaMorandi tour in 1988.

== Discography ==
- 1990 – Viva
- 1993 – Mi vuoi bene o no?
- 1996 – Baraldi lubrificanti
- 2001 – Rosasporco
- 2003 – Angela Baraldi
