= But Forever in My Mind =

- Directed by: Gabriele Muccino
- Written by: Gabriele Muccino; Silvio Muccino; Adele Tulli
- Produced by: Domenico Procacci
- Starring: Silvio Muccino; Anna Galiena
- Cinematography: Arnaldo Catinari
- Edited by: Claudio Di Mauro
- Music by: Paolo Buonvino
- Production company: Fandango
- Distributed by: Mikado Film
- Release dates: 1 October 1999 (Italy); 20 December 2000 (U.S.)
- Running time: 88 Min
- Country: Italy
- Language: Italian

But Forever in My Mind (Italian: Come te nessuno mai) is a 1999 Italian comedy film directed by Gabriele Muccino. Its original Italian title translates into "Like you, nobody, never"

== Plot ==
The movie is a tale about a young boy aroused by the sexual awakenings and the political views of the Italian youth. It's set around a group of friends. Silvio (the main character), Ponzi (his best friend) and a group of boys and girls that go to the same school. When the school is threatened with privatization, the students gather to decide whether to occupy the school or take a different action. The most radical kids end up setting the tone of the oncoming protest; the school is going to be occupied. In the night the friends gather, girls in one place and boys in another. They smoke and share experiences. Martino tells the boys that he's had sex with his girlfriend, and that he can last about ten minutes. On the other hand, as the girls chat, his girlfriend tells her friends that it was all very fast.

The next morning, as Ponzi comes to pick up Silvio at his place, he tells him that the school has been shut down and they're going to invade and occupy. When they reach the school, Silvio is one of the lads that gets to a backdoor. They rush in and let the rest of the crowd in. The school is taken, Silvio is exploring the grounds along with Martino's girl (who, we learn, is a long lost love interest of his). They break into the archives and Silvio tells her that Martino is bragging about having sex with her. She gets mad about it and they make out. Silvio is thrilled and ends up telling Ponzi all about it on his way out (he was going home to get his sleeping bag, get back and sleep over at the school, hoping to get more intimate with the girl). Ponzi couldn't keep the secret and so the rumour is out. And the story builds up as it gets to Martino's ear. He gets furious and decides to get things right with Silvio and his girlfriend. The rumours of the archive kisses reach the girl's ear, now she thinks Silvio is just another boy.

At home, Silvio gets into an argument with his father and ends up not making it to the school. We see a rather disturbed relationship of everyday conflicts and discussions, built up emotions and generational conflicts, with the parents trying to tell their stories differently than the ones happening right now. Silvio escapes and at the school there's confrontation against the fascists. As he chases a fascist down the street with a stick, his father stops him and take him home. Another argument at the dinner table ensues.

At the school the kids are chilling, smoking dope and getting closer to each other. Movies are being shown of old protests. Communist flags and revolutionary symbols are all around.

At this point, Claudia begins to step up as a major character. She is talking to a friend, telling her that's it's been six months since she realized that she was in love with Silvio. The friend encourages her to call and tell him how she feels, she fights it for a while but calls him nonetheless. As she calls, Silvio starts to talk about his feelings for the other girl. Claudia hangs up at first. He calls back thinking the line was down. She invites him out the next day, tells him that they should hang out to talk.

Martino has been at the school and learned all about the betrayal. He now rushes to the house of Silvio. As he gets there he rings and Silvio comes down, he punches him and storms away.

The next day, Ponzi calls Silvio and tells him that he has slept over at the school. Silvio goes out to the school. The police arrive at the scene of the occupation. The kids decide to resist. As the police come to storm the gates, the students throw eggs at them. The riot squad beats up a few kids. Some escape, but most of them get arrested: the jealousy-fueled Martino, the most exalted kids, Ponzi and most of the minor characters. Amongst the ones that got away we find Silvio and Claudia. As they talk, Claudia tells him that she has loved him for a long time. He doesn't say anything special in reply. Claudia drops him at home. When she gets home she goes to bed sad. Meanwhile, all the kids are at the police department, even the toughest kids have to call their dads.

Silvio is confused about his friend. He consults his heartbroken brother and he tells him that he should only enjoy the girl but shouldn't fall in love with her. When he goes to Claudia's place, Claudia's mother wakes her up and she gets up confused. She welcomes him and he tells her that they should be together. She closes the door to her room and they kiss. Her mother knocks on the door and tells them that they shouldn't be in locked doors. Claudia takes him up to the rooftop, there they kiss and she asks him if he wants to make love right there. He says yes and things just happen. After they are done, Silvio rushes to Ponzi's house to tell him that he is no longer a virgin. Ponzi swears not to tell anyone this time. When Silvio tells Ponzi about his brother's advice Ponzi says that his brother doesn't know anything. They talk as they walk away and the movie ends.

== Cast ==
- Silvio Muccino - Silvio Ristuccia
- Giuseppe Sanfelice - Ponzi
- Giulia Steigerwalt - Claudia
- Giulia Carmignani - Valentina
- Luca De Filippo - Silvio's father
- Anna Galiena - Silvio's mother
- Enrico Silvestrin - Alberto Ristuccia
- Giulia Ciccone - Chiara Ristuccia
- Simone Pagani - Martino
- Caterina Silva - Giulia
- Sara Pelagalli - Marta
- Saverio Micheli - Filippo
- Cristiano Iuliano - Lorenzo
- Nicola Campiotti - Gustavo
- Diane Fleri - Arianna
- Alessandro Palombo - Leon

== Awards ==
- Venice Film Festival, Rota Soundtrack Award (Paolo Bounvino)
- Brussels International Film Festival
- 4 Nastro d'Argento nominations
- 4 David di Donatello nominations
