= Branchie =

- Poster
- Directed by: Francesco Ranieri Martinotti
- Screenplay by: Fulvio Ottaviano; Francesco Ranieri Martinotti
- Based on: Branchie by Niccolò Ammaniti
- Produced by: Fulvio Ottaviano
- Starring: Gianluca Grignani; Valentina Cervi
- Cinematography: Marco Cristiani
- Edited by: Mauro Bonanni
- Music by: Andrea Rocca
- Production companies: Alia Film; Iterfilm; Ministry of Culture
- Release date: 12 November 1999
- Country: Italy
- Language: Italian

Branchie (transl. Gills) is a 1999 Italian romantic comedy film directed by Francesco Ranieri Martinotti and starring Gianluca Grignani and Valentina Cervi. It is loosely based on the novel of the same name by Niccolò Ammaniti. The film was released on 12 November 1999 to negative reviews.

== Plot ==
Terminally ill with cancer, Marco Donati only has three months to live and decides to work in an abandoned aquarium in Rome. He receives a letter from India from a mysterious person named Mrs. Margareth, who asks him to build the largest aquarium in Delhi. While in India, he has strange encounters with a new group of friends.

== Cast ==
- Gianluca Grignani as Marco Donati
- Valentina Cervi as Livia
- Tomas Arana as Valery Subotnik
- Christopher Buchholz as Olivier
- Gianluca Gobbi as Gogo
- Andrea Bove as Franco
- Enzo Limardi as Gabriele
- Malvika Singh as Mila
- Michael Muthu as Sarwar
- Nandana Sen as Eugenia
- Aditya Kamalapurkar as Deuter
- Mithran Devanesan as Maggiordomo
- Gulshan Grover as John Paul
- Paola Quattrini as Eugenia
- Chokkalinga Bhagavathar as Kumar

== Production ==
Gianluca Grignani made his acting debut with this film. The film was shot for around four weeks in Madras and Genoa.

== Reception ==
A critic from Mymovies rated the film one out of five stars. A critic from Film UP wrote that "The character of Marco is an attempt to describe what is commonly believed to be today's young people with a sense of malaise and existential discomfort, which are manifested by the disease. The trip to India is in a certain sense the liberation from all those constraints that this stereotype would feel from the society surrounding it. In these places you breathe differently, it is a world where spirituality is felt more than the material sense that is experienced in the West".
