= Eccezzziunale... veramente =

1982 film

- 2012 poster for a 30th-anniversary screening of the film
- Directed by: Carlo Vanzina
- Written by: Carlo Vanzina; Diego Abatantuono; Enrico Vanzina
- Produced by: Claudio Bonivento; Alessandro Fracassi
- Starring: Diego Abatantuono; Massimo Boldi; Teo Teocoli; Stefania Sandrelli
- Cinematography: Alberto Spagnoli
- Edited by: Raimondo Crociani
- Music by: Detto Mariano
- Release date: 9 April 1982
- Running time: 95 minutes
- Country: Italy
- Language: Italian

Eccezzziunale... veramente (Note: The title is a distorted form of veramente eccezionale (roughly translating to "really outstanding") based on Abatantuono's trademark slang of the time, mimicking the talk of a poorly educated immigrant from Southern Italy.) is a 1982 Italian comedy film directed by Carlo Vanzina. It was shown as part of a retrospective on Italian comedy at the 67th Venice International Film Festival.

== Plot ==
Diego Abatantuono portrays three different parts as a supporter of the three main football teams of Italy: A.C. Milan, Internazionale and Juventus.

The three characters are: Donato Cavallo (A.C. Milan supporter), the chief of the hooligans of the southern stand in San Siro stadium; Franco Alfano, Inter supporter who believes he won the football lottery, but it is just a prank made by his friends; Tirzan, Juventus supporter, is a truck driver from Apulia, who decided to follow his beloved team to Belgium for a European Cup game.

== Cast ==
- Diego Abatantuono as Donato Cavallo / Franco Alfano / Felice La Pezza, aka "Tirzan"
- Massimo Boldi as Massimo
- Teo Teocoli as Teo
- Stefania Sandrelli as Loredana
- Yorgo Voyagis as "The Slav"
- Ugo Conti as Ugo
- Anna Melato as Franco's Wife
- Gianfranco Barra as Inspector Patanè
- Clara Colosimo as Franco's mother-in-law
- Renzo Ozzano as a Parisian Inspector
- Renato D'Amore as Sandrino
- Franco Caraccioloas a Hitchhiker
- Enio Drovandi as a Policeman
- Guido Nicheli as a Man at a bar
- Franca Scagnetti as La Monica's Wife
