= As God Commands =

2008 film

- Film poster
- Directed by: Gabriele Salvatores
- Written by: Niccolò Ammaniti; Antonio Manzini; Gabriele Salvatores
- Produced by: Maurizio Totti
- Starring: Filippo Timi; Elio Germano; Alvaro Caleca; Angelica Leo
- Cinematography: Italo Petriccione
- Release date: 12 December 2008
- Running time: 103 minutes
- Country: Italy
- Language: Italian

As God Commands (Italian: Come Dio сomanda) is a 2008 Italian drama film directed by Gabriele Salvatores, based on novel of the same name by Niccolò Ammaniti. It was entered into the 31st Moscow International Film Festival.

== Cast ==
- Filippo Timi as Rino Zena
- Elio Germano as Quattro Formaggi
- Alvaro Caleca as Cristiano Zena
- Angelica Leo as Fabiana
- Fabio De Luigi as Trecca
- Alessandro Mizzi as Uomo SUV
- Corinna Agustoni as Maria Pirro
- Alessandro Bressanello as Marchetta
- Ludovica Di Rocco as Esmeralda
- Valentina Sussi as Ragazza Centro Sociale
- Andrea De Nori as Alex
