= Me and You (novel) =

2010 novel by Niccolò Ammaniti

- First edition (Italian)
- Author: Niccolò Ammaniti
- Original title: Io e te
- Translator: Kylee Doust
- Language: Italian
- Genre: Coming-of-age story
- Published: 2010 (Einaudi) (Italian); 2012 (Black Cat) (English)
- Publication place: Italy
- Media type: Print
- Pages: 117
- ISBN: 9788806206802
- OCLC: 781237328

Me and You (Italian: Io e te) is a novel by Niccolò Ammaniti.

In 2012, director Bernardo Bertolucci adapted the novel into a film of the same name. Since the novel served as a screenplay for the movie, Ammaniti was nominated for Best Screenplay at the 2013 David di Donatello awards and Best Screenplay at the 2013 Italian Golden Globe.

== Plot ==
The action takes place in Rome in 2000. The main character is Lorenzo, a 14-year-old highly introverted boy who has had problems socialising and relating to other children since he was little. He is diagnosed with narcissistic personality disorder, a fact that makes him feel superior to others and does not want to mix in. The only people worthy of his affection are his father, his mother and his grandmother.

Growing up, Lorenzo learns to blend in with others to appear normal. One day he hears a group of teenagers at his school organising a skiing holiday in Cortina d’Ampezzo, and feels strangely disappointed at not being invited. Back home he tells his mother that he has been invited along on a skiing weekend with friends — the group of teenagers — even though this is not true. His mother is so happy at his progress in making friends that she shuts herself in the bathroom and cries with joy. Because she is so happy in the following days, Lorenzo feels unable to admit that it is not true. On the day of departure his mother drives him to the house of Alessia Roncato, the girl whose family are organising the trip, but he manages to persuade her to drop him off a few blocks early. Once she has left, he watches for a few moments from a distance as the family packs the car, then heads back towards home on the tram with his skis. While waiting near his apartment building, he receives a call from his mother who wishes to thank Alessia's mother. He lies, saying that she can't speak because she's driving. He is then able to sneak back into the basement of the apartment building, where he plans to spend the week in hiding, having prepared food, drinks and his PlayStation.

He continues to receive calls from his mother, but then also one from his half-sister, Olivia, from his father's first marriage, nine years older than him and who he hasn't seen in a long time. She asks if his parents are at home, and he pretends not to know, thinking his parents might have asked her to investigate. A short while later he hears someone trying to open the lock to the basement and Olivia enters, looking for something in a box of her old things. She doesn't find it and leaves in desperation. In the middle of the night she returns, knocking on the window and asking Lorenzo if she can stay the night. At first he refuses categorically, but when she threatens to tell everyone he is there, he backs down. This turns out to be useful, since his mother soon calls again, more insistent than ever that she needs to speak to Alessia's mother, and he persuades Olivia to pretend to be her.

It turns out, though, that Olivia has become a drug addict and is suffering from withdrawal from heroin, and this is why she's in a desperate situation. She asks him for some sleeping pills. The only place he can think of getting them is from his grandmother who is dying in hospital. He visits her and finds the pills in her handbag, but ends up spending much longer at the hospital than intended when his grandmother wakes up and asks him to tell her a story. Once back in the basement, Lorenzo finds Olivia passed out, almost dead. During his absence she has rummaged through all the boxes and found and taken some sleeping pills. She sleeps solidly for three days.

By the end of the week, the relationship between Lorenzo and Olivia has changed from hostility to complicity, since they both feel rejected by society, both have secrets, and both feel understood, without judgement, by the other. Olivia promises not to use drugs anymore and they both promise to stay in touch. On the last morning Lorenzo awakes to find a note Olivia has left, reminding him of their mutual promise.

It is this note that Lorenzo has ten years later, in the first and last pages of the book, that form a narrative frame. Lorenzo, now 24, is on his way to identify her body after she has died of an overdose.

== Reception ==
complete review gave the novel a "B−". The Independent described the novel as "an original, thought-provoking and well-written piece of fiction". The Financial Times praised how the novel was able to beautifully capture the eccentricity of the protagonist. The Scotsman described the novel as "near-perfect" and acclaimed the vitality of the two characters and the relationship between them.
