= Chimera (2001 film) =

2001 film by Pappi Corsicato

- Directed by: Pappi Corsicato
- Screenplay by: Ivan Cotroneo
- Story by: Pappi Corsicato
- Starring: Iaia Forte; Tommaso Ragno; Franco Nero
- Cinematography: Cesare Accetta
- Release date: 2001
- Language: Italian

Chimera is a 2001 Italian romance film directed by Pappi Corsicato.

== Plot ==
One night in bed a husband tells his wife about a couple he knows whose relationship has fallen through. This leads to a series of role-playing games to make sure their relationship does not head down the same path.

== Cast ==
- Iaia Forte as Emma
- Tommaso Ragno as Sal
- Tomas Arana as Tomas
- Angelica Ippolito as Dora
- Franco Nero as The Businessman
- Marit Nissen as Desirè

== Award and Nominations ==
Award	Category	
Golden Goblets	Best Cinematography	Won
Golden Ciak Awards	Best Cinematography	Nominated
	Best Production Design	Nominated
	Best Costume Design	Nominated
Montréal World Film Festival		Nominated
