= Maurizio Donadoni =

Italian actor (born 1958)

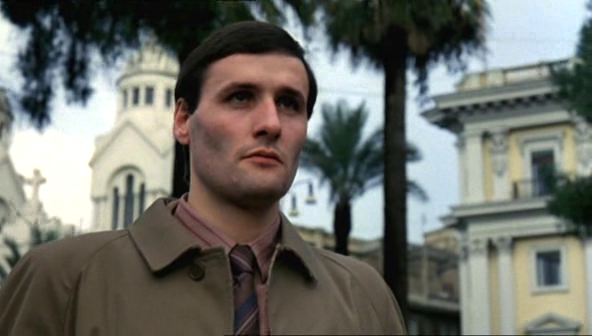
- Maurizio Donadoni in The Moro Affair, 1986
- Born: 7 January 1958 (age 67); Bergamo, Italy
- Occupation: Actor

Maurizio Donadoni (born 7 January 1958) is an Italian film, stage and television actor.

Born in Bergamo, Donadoni started his career on stage in the late 1970s, working among others with Luca Ronconi and Gabriele Lavia. He made his film debut in 1982, working mainly with young directors, but also collaborating with established directors such as Marco Ferreri, Marco Bellocchio and Marco Tullio Giordana. He is also active on television, appearing in a number of series and TV-movies of some success.

== Selected filmography ==
- The Story of Piera (1983)
- Chewingum (1984)
- The Future Is Woman (1984)
- I Love You (1986)
- The Moro Affair (1986)
- Sweets from a Stranger (1987)
- A Violent Life (1990)
- Reflections in a Dark Sky (1991)
- Who Wants to Kill Sara? (1992)
- An Eyewitness Account (1997)
- In Love and War (2001)
- My Mother's Smile (2002)
- Bear's Kiss (2002)
- Nero (2004)
- Wild Blood (2004)
- The Wedding Director (2006)
- Caravaggio (2007)
- Pinocchio (2008)
- A Quiet Life (2010)
- The Solitude of Prime Numbers (2010)
- The Complexity of Happiness (2015)
- Martin Eden (2019)
- Devotion, a Story of Love and Desire (2022)
- Caravaggio's Shadow (2022)
- A Hundred Sundays (2023)
