= Amnèsia =

- DVD Cover
- Directed by: Gabriele Salvatores
- Written by: Andrea Garello; Ramón Salazar; Gabriele Salvatores
- Produced by: Maurizio Totti
- Starring: Diego Abatantuono; Sergio Rubini; Martina Stella; Alessandra Martines
- Cinematography: Italo Petriccione
- Distributed by: Medusa Film(Italy); 20th Century Fox (Spain)
- Release date: 8 March 2002
- Running time: 120 minutes
- Countries: Italy; Spain
- Language: Italian

Amnèsia is an Italian comedy-drama film directed by Gabriele Salvatores and released in March 8 2002.

== Plot ==
Several stories unfold simultaneously over three days on the Mediterranean island of Ibiza. A man stumbles upon a risky opportunity to become instantly wealthy; a producer of pornographic films tries to rebuild his relationship with his estranged daughter; a police chief and his son maintain an uneasy co-existence; and a woman longs for her lover to be released from prison.

== Cast ==
- Diego Abatantuono as Sandro
- Sergio Rubini as Angelino
- Martina Stella as Luce
- Bebo Storti as Ernesto
- Juanjo Puigcorbé as Xavier
- Rubén Ochandiano as Jorge
- María Jurado as Alicia
- Antonia San Juan as Pilar
- Ian McNeice as Doug Chandler
- Alessandra Martines as Virginie
- Ugo Conti as Dani
