= Me and You (film) =

2012 film by Bernardo Bertolucci

- Theatrical release poster
- Italian: Io e te
- Directed by: Bernardo Bertolucci
- Screenplay by: Niccolò Ammaniti; Umberto Contarello; Francesca Marciano; Bernardo Bertolucci
- Based on: Me and You by Niccolò Ammaniti
- Produced by: Fausto Brizzi; Mario Gianani; Lorenzo Mieli
- Starring: Jacopo Olmo Antinori; Tea Falco; Sonia Bergamasco; Veronica Lazar; Tommaso Ragno; Pippo Delbono
- Cinematography: Fabio Cianchetti
- Edited by: Jacopo Quadri
- Music by: Franco Piersanti
- Production companies: Fiction; Wildside; Medusa Film
- Distributed by: Medusa Distribuzione
- Release dates: 22 May 2012 (Cannes); 25 October 2012 (Italy)
- Running time: 103 minutes
- Country: Italy
- Language: Italian
- Box office: $2.6 million

Me and You (Italian: Io e te) is a 2012 Italian coming-of-age drama film co-written and directed by Bernardo Bertolucci, based on the 2010 novel of the same name by Niccolò Ammaniti. The film was screened out of competition at the 2012 Cannes Film Festival. It was Bertolucci's final feature film before his death in 2018.

== Premise ==
Lorenzo, an introverted teenager, has difficulties in communicating with other people and pays more attention to his inner world. When his class goes on a week-long ski trip to the mountains, Lorenzo secretly settles in the basement of his apartment building. However, his loneliness is interrupted by an unexpected visit from his older half-sister Olivia.

== Cast ==
- Jacopo Olmo Antinori as Lorenzo
- Tea Falco as Olivia
- Sonia Bergamasco as Lorenzo's mother
- Veronica Lazar as Lorenzo's grandmother
- Tommaso Ragno as Ferdinando
- Pippo Delbono as the psychologist

== Reception ==
On the review aggregator website Rotten Tomatoes, the film holds an approval rating of 67% based on 43 reviews, with an average rating of 6/10. The website's critics consensus reads, "A minor entry in a magnificent filmography, Me and You doesn't stand with Bertolucci's greatest works, but it's still an engaging character study." Metacritic, which uses a weighted average, assigned the film a score of 57 out of 100, based on 17 critics, indicating "mixed or average" reviews. Philip French of The Observer called it "a lightweight disappointing affair".
