= Anna (Italian TV series) =

Italian television series

- Genre: Drama; Post-apocalyptic; Dystopian
- Created by: Niccolò Ammaniti
- Based on: Anna by Niccolò Ammaniti
- Written by: Niccolò Ammaniti; Francesca Maniero
- Directed by: Niccolò Ammaniti
- Starring: Giulia Dragotto; Alessandro Pecorella; Elena Lietti; Roberta Mattei; Giovanni Mavilla; Clara Tramontano; Viviana Mocciaro; Nicola Mangano
- Country of origin: Italy
- No. of seasons: 1
- No. of episodes: 6

Production
- Running time: 50 minutes
- Production companies: Wildside; Kwai; The New Life Company

Original release
- Network: Sky Atlantic
- Release: 23 April 2021

Anna is an Italian drama television series written and directed by Niccolò Ammaniti.

It is an adaptation of Ammaniti's post-apocalyptic novel of the same name, originally published in 2015.

== Cast ==
=== Main ===
- Giulia Dragotto as Anna Salemi, a 13-years-old Sicilian girl
  - Viviana Mocciaro as Anna as a child
- Alessandro Pecorella as Astor, Anna's little brother
  - Nicola Mangano as Astor as a baby
- Elena Lietti as Maria Grazia, Anna and Astor's mother
- Roberta Mattei as Katia, a mysterious woman known as "Picciridduna"
- Giovanni Mavilla as Pietro, a teenage boy who befriends Anna
  - Ludovico Colnago as Pietro as a child
- Clara Tramontano as Angelica, a teenage girl who rules the gang of the "Blues" and the "Whites"
  - Matilde Sofia Fazio as Angelica as a child

=== Guest ===
- Corrado Fortuna as Damiano, Astor's father
- Giovanni Calcagno as Marco Salemi, Anna's father
- Chiara Muscato as Anna's teacher
- Danilo and Dario Di Vita as the twin brothers Mario and Paolo
- Tommaso Ragno as the twins' father
- Miriam Dalmazio as Ginevra
- Sara Ciocca as "Snow White"
- Oro De Commarque as "Cinderella"
- Elisa Miccoli as "Red Riding Hood"
- Adele Perna as Pietro's mother
- Vincenzo Masci as Nucci
- Nicola Nocella as Saverio
- Sergio Albelli as the Pope

== See also ==
- List of Italian television series
