= The Council of Egypt =

- Directed by: Emidio Greco
- Starring: Silvio Orlando; Tommaso Ragno; Renato Carpentieri
- Cinematography: Marco Sperduti
- Music by: Luis Enriquez Bacalov
- Release date: 2002
- Country: Italy
- Language: Italian

The Council of Egypt (Italian: Il consiglio d'Egitto) is a 2002 Italian drama film directed by Emidio Greco. It is based on the novel with the same name written by Leonardo Sciascia. It premiered at the 2002 Montreal World Film Festival, in which it entered the main competition. The film was awarded with a Nastro d'Argento for best scenography.

== Cast ==
- Silvio Orlando: Don Giuseppe Vella
- Tommaso Ragno: Layer Francesco Paolo Di Blasi
- Renato Carpentieri: Monsignor Ayroldi
- Antonio Catania: Don Saverio Zarbo
- Marine Delterme: Countess Regalpetra
- Leopoldo Trieste: Father Salvatore
- Giancarlo Giannini: Narrator (voice)
