= Puerto Escondido (film) =

- Directed by: Gabriele Salvatores
- Written by: Gabriele Salvatores, Diego Abatantuono, Enzo Monteleone
- Produced by: Mario Cecchi Gori, Vittorio Cecchi Gori
- Starring: Diego Abatantuono, Claudio Bisio
- Cinematography: Italo Petriccione
- Edited by: Nino Baragli
- Music by: Federico De Robertis; Mauro Pagani
- Distributed by: Penta
- Release date: 15 November 1992
- Running time: 109 minutes
- Country: Italy
- Language: Italian

Puerto Escondido is a 1992 Italian comedy film directed by Gabriele Salvatores. For this film Diego Abatantuono and Renato Carpentieri were awarded with Silver Ribbons for best actor and best supporting actor.

== Plot ==
In a bank of Milan, the banker Mario Tozzi is involved in an ambush against him: he is hit by two shots in the bathroom of the building, and as soon as he recovers from convalescence, believing that his assailant intends seriously to kill him, Mario decides to run away from Italy, taking refuge in Mexico. Mario chooses the small and remote land of Puerto Escondido, where he meets two very nice Italians, fled there a long time ago to escape from the frantic life of the city. They are Alex and Anita, which Mario makes friends right away, and he fits in a short time in the life of that place. However, since the money is not there, the three companions try to get away using illegal methods. One night Mario meets in that port his assailant, who is also suffering at the cruel life of the city. In fact, he decides to convert to the peace of Puerto Escondido.
Become four now, the comrades plan a heist that will guarantee them at least a year of peace; however the project ends badly...

== Cast ==
- Diego Abatantuono: Mario Tozzi
- Claudio Bisio: Alex
- Valeria Golino: Anita
- Renato Carpentieri: Police Commissioner Viola
- Antonio Catania: Di Gennaro
- Fabrizio Bentivoglio: Mario from Caserta
- Ugo Conti: Friend of Alex and Anita

== Reception ==
The film grossed $2.3 million in Italy in its first two weeks.
