= Claudia Zanella =

Italian actress

- Born: 30 March 1979 (age 47); Florence, Italy
- Occupation: Actress
- Years active: 2004-present
- Spouse: Fausto Brizzi (m. 2014; div. 2019)

Claudia Zanella (born 30 March 1979) is an Italian actress. She appeared in more than twenty films since 2004. On 19 July 2014 she married film director Fausto Brizzi.

== Selected filmography ==
Year	Title	Role	Notes
2005	Quo Vadis, Baby?	Ada Cantini	
2006	The Wedding Director	Chiara Elica	
2008	Amore che vieni, amore che vai	Maritza	
2011	All at Sea	Sara	
2013	Women Drive Me Crazy	Veronica Morelli	
2016	Forever Young	Marta	
2022	Everything Calls For Salvation	Ludovico's wife	television series
