= Quo Vadis, Baby? =

2005 film

- Directed by: Gabriele Salvatores
- Written by: Gabriele Salvatores; Grazia Verasani
- Produced by: Antonio Tacchia; Maurizio Totti
- Starring: Angela Baraldi; Gigio Alberti; Claudia Zanella; Andrea Renzi; Elio Germano; Luigi Maria Burruano
- Cinematography: Italo Petriccione
- Edited by: Claudio Di Mauro
- Music by: Ezio Bosso
- Distributed by: Medusa Distribuzione
- Release date: 2005
- Running time: 105 minutes
- Country: Italy
- Language: Italian

Quo Vadis, Baby? is a 2005 Italian mystery film directed by Gabriele Salvatores.

== Plot ==
Sixteen years after her sister's tragic suicide, a tough female private detective investigates her death. Giorgia Cantini, 39 y.o., a declining Bolognese detective who works in her father's investigative agency, spends her nights wandering from one room to another. When Aldo -friend of his older sister, Ada, suicidal inexplicably sixteen years before- sends her videotapes that reconstruct the diary of suicide woman, Giorgia begins to dig into the past to shed light on her existence and the one of Ada.

== Cast ==
- Angela Baraldi as Giorgia Cantini
- Gigio Alberti as Andrea Berti
- Claudia Zanella as Ada Cantini
- Elio Germano as Lucio
- Luigi Maria Burruano as Captain Cantini
- Andrea Renzi as Commissioner Bruni
- Alessandra D'Elia as Anna Loy
- Bebo Storti as Lattice
- Serena Grandi
- Simone Borrelli as Rospetto
