= Bernardo Bertolucci =

Italian filmmaker (1941–2018)

Bernardo Bertolucci OMRI
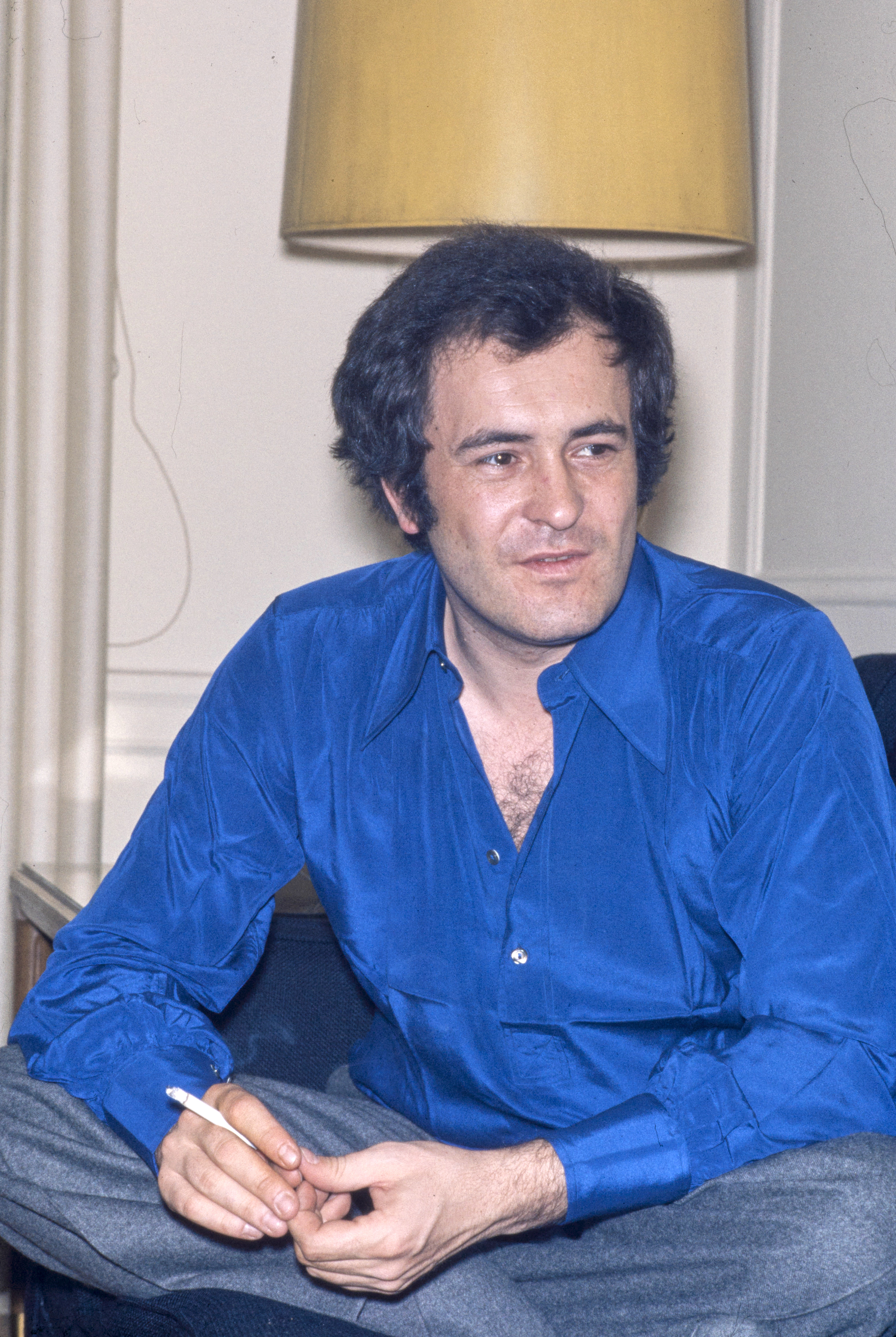
- Bertolucci, c. 1971
- Born: 16 March 1941; Parma, Italy
- Died: 26 November 2018 (aged 77); Rome, Italy
- Occupations: Film director; screenwriter
- Years active: 1962–2018
- Spouses: Adriana Asti (divorced); Clare Peploe (m. 1979)
- Father: Attilio Bertolucci
- Relatives: Mark Peploe (brother-in-law); Giuseppe Bertolucci (brother)
- Awards
- Bertolucci's voice From the BBC programme Front Row; Recorded 29 April 2013

Bernardo Bertolucci (/ˌbɜːrtəˈluːtʃi/ BUR-tə-LOO-chee; Italian: [berˈnardo bertoˈluttʃi]; 16 March 1941 – 26 November 2018) was an Italian film director and screenwriter with a career that spanned 50 years. Considered one of the greatest directors in the history of cinema, Bertolucci's work achieved international acclaim. With The Last Emperor (1987) he became the first Italian filmmaker to win the Academy Award for Best Director, (Note: Italian-born Frank Capra won in the category twice, but was a naturalized U.S. citizen.) and he received many other accolades including a BAFTA Award, a César Award, two Golden Globes, a Golden Lion for Lifetime Achievement, and an Honorary Palme d'Or.

A protégé of Pier Paolo Pasolini, Bertolucci made his directorial debut at 22. His second film, Before the Revolution (1964), earned strong international reviews and has since gained classic status, being called a "masterpiece of Italian cinema" by Film4. His 1970 film The Conformist, an adaptation of the Alberto Moravia novel, is considered a classic of international cinema, and was nominated for an Academy Award for Best Adapted Screenplay and the prestigious Berlin Golden Bear. His 1972 erotic drama Last Tango in Paris was controversial due to its rape scene and, later, comments made by actress Maria Schneider about her treatment on set. Bertolucci's later films such as the historical epic 1900 (1976), the family drama La Luna (1979), and the darkly comedic Tragedy of a Ridiculous Man (1981), were also controversial but acclaimed.

His 1987 film The Last Emperor, a biopic of Chinese monarch Puyi, was a critical and commercial success, earning rave reviews and sweeping the 60th Academy Awards (including Best Picture and Best Director). This was the start of what has since been described as his "Oriental Trilogy", a trio of films including The Sheltering Sky, an adaptation of the novel of the same name, and Little Buddha, a Buddhist religious epic, all three of which feature scores by Ryuichi Sakamoto. His 1996 film, Stealing Beauty, brought him his second of two Palme d'Or nominations. He continued directing well into the 21st century, releasing his final film, Me and You, in 2012.

Bertolucci's films often deal with themes of politics, sexuality, history, class conflict and social taboos, and his style has influenced several filmmakers. Several of his films have appeared on lists of the greatest films of all time. Critics have remarked that what makes Bertolucci different than other directors is his masterful combination of "visual richness and visual freedom".

== Early life ==
Bertolucci was born in the Italian city of Parma, in the region of Emilia-Romagna. He was the elder son of Ninetta (Giovanardi), a teacher, and Attilio Bertolucci, who was a poet, a reputed art historian, anthologist and film critic. His mother was born in Australia, to an Italian father and an Australian mother (of Irish and Scottish descent).

Having been raised in an artistic environment, Bertolucci began writing at the age of 15, and soon after received several prestigious literary prizes, including the Premio Viareggio for his first book. His father's background helped his career: the elder Bertolucci had helped the Italian filmmaker Pier Paolo Pasolini publish his first novel, and Pasolini reciprocated by hiring Bertolucci as his first assistant in Rome on Accattone (1961).

Bertolucci had one brother, the theatre director and playwright Giuseppe (27 February 1947 – 16 June 2012). His cousin was the film producer Giovanni Bertolucci (24 June 1940 – 17 February 2005), with whom he worked on a number of films.

== Career ==
=== Directorial breakthrough ===
Bertolucci initially wished to become a poet like his father. With this goal in mind, he attended the Faculty of Modern Literature of the University of Rome from 1958 to 1961, where his film career as an assistant director to Pasolini began. Shortly after, Bertolucci left the university without graduating. In 1962, at the age of 22, he directed his first feature film, produced by Tonino Cervi with a screenplay by Pasolini, called La commare secca (1962). The film is a murder mystery, following a prostitute's homicide. Bertolucci uses flashbacks to piece together the crime and the person who committed it. The film which shortly followed was his acclaimed Before the Revolution (Prima della rivoluzione, 1964).

The boom of Italian cinema, which gave Bertolucci his start, slowed in the 1970s as directors were forced to co-produce their films with several of the American, Swedish, French, and German companies and actors due to the effects of the global economic recession on the Italian film industry. Bertolucci entered film making already working at a big scale.

In 1971, film critic for The New Yorker, Pauline Kael called Bertolucci a prodigy.

Bertolucci caused controversy in 1972 with the film Last Tango in Paris, starring Marlon Brando, Maria Schneider, Jean-Pierre Léaud and Massimo Girotti. The film presents Brando's character, Paul, as he copes with his wife's suicide by emotionally and physically dominating a young woman, Jeanne (Schneider). The depictions of Schneider, then 19 years old, have been criticized as exploitive. In one scene, Paul anally rapes Jeanne using butter as a lubricant. Bertolucci said use of butter was not in the script; Bertolucci and Brando had discussed it, but they did not tell Schneider. According to Schneider, the rape scene was not in the script at all. She said in 2007 that she had cried "real tears" during the scene and had felt humiliated and "a little raped". In 2013 Bertolucci said that he had withheld the information from Schneider to generate a real "reaction of frustration and rage". Brando alleged that Bertolucci had wanted the characters to have real sex, but Brando and Schneider both said it was simulated. In 2016 Bertolucci released a statement where he clarified that Schneider had known of the violence to be depicted in the scene, but had not been told about the use of butter.

Following the "media glare" and her fame after the film's release, Schneider became a drug addict and suicidal. Criminal proceedings were brought against Bertolucci in Italy for obscenity; the film was sequestered by the censorship commission and all copies were ordered destroyed. An Italian court revoked Bertolucci's civil rights for five years and gave him a four-month suspended prison sentence. In 1978, the Appeals Court of Bologna ordered three copies of the film to be preserved in the national film library with the stipulation that they could not be viewed, until Bertolucci was later able to re-submit it for general distribution with no cuts.

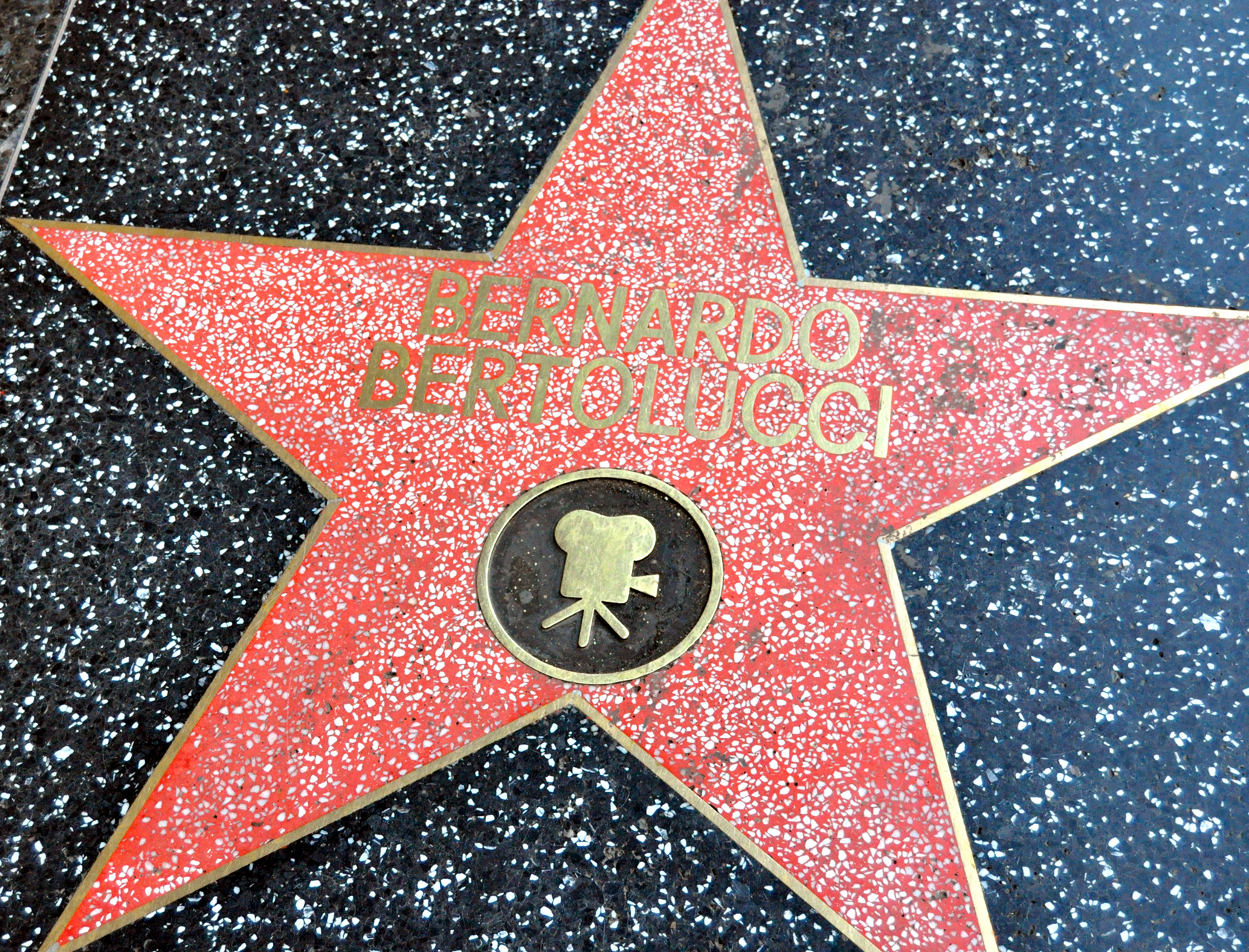
Bertolucci's star on Hollywood Walk of Fame

Bertolucci increased his fame with his next few films, from 1900 (1976), an epic depiction of the struggles of farmers in Emilia-Romagna from the beginning of the 20th century up to World War II with an international cast (Robert De Niro, Gérard Depardieu, Donald Sutherland, Sterling Hayden, Burt Lancaster, Dominique Sanda) to La Luna, set in Rome and in Emilia-Romagna, in which Bertolucci deals with the thorny issue of drugs and incest, and finally La tragedia di un uomo ridicolo (1981), with Ugo Tognazzi.

He then wrote two screenplays based on Dashiell Hammett's Red Harvest. He hoped this would be his first film set in America, but nothing came of it.

=== The Last Emperor and later career ===
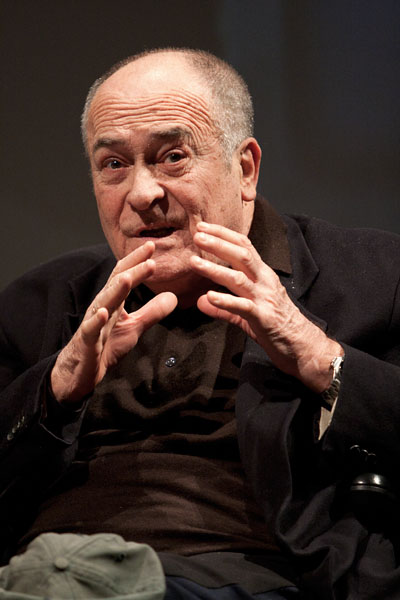
Bertolucci in 2011

In 1987, Bertolucci directed the epic The Last Emperor, a biographical film telling the life story of Aisin-Gioro Puyi, the last emperor of China. The film was independently produced by British producer Jeremy Thomas, with whom Bertolucci worked almost exclusively from then on. The film was independently financed and three years in the making. Bertolucci, who co-wrote the film with Mark Peploe, won the Academy Award for Best Director. The film uses Puyi's life as a mirror that reflects China's passage from feudalism through revolution to its current state.

At the 60th Academy Awards, The Last Emperor won all nine Oscars for which it was nominated: Best Picture, Best Director, Best Writing, Screenplay Based on Material from Another Medium, Best Cinematography, Best Film Editing, Best Costume Design, Best Art Direction-Set Decoration, Best Music, Original Score and Best Sound.

The Last Emperor was the first feature film ever authorized by the government of the People's Republic of China to film in the Forbidden City. Bertolucci had proposed the film to the Chinese government as one of two possible projects. The other film was La Condition Humaine by André Malraux. The Chinese government preferred The Last Emperor.

After The Last Emperor, The Sheltering Sky and Little Buddha, Bertolucci returned to Italy to film, and to revisit his old themes but with varying results from both critics and the public. He filmed Stealing Beauty in 1996, then The Dreamers in 2003, which describes the political passions and sexual revolutions of two siblings in Paris in 1968.

In 2007, Bertolucci received the Golden Lion Award at the Venice Film Festival for his life's work, and in 2011 he also received the Palme d'Or at the Cannes Film Festival.

In 2012, his final film, Me and You, was screened out of competition at the 2012 Cannes Film Festival and was released early in 2013 in the UK. The film is an adaptation of Niccolò Ammaniti's young adult book Me and You. The screenplay for the movie was written by Bertolucci, Umberto Contarello and Niccolò Ammaniti. Bertolucci originally intended to shoot the film in 3D but was forced to abandon this plan due to cost.

Bertolucci appeared on the Radio Four programme Start the Week on 22 April 2013, and on Front Row on 29 April 2013, where he chose La Dolce Vita, a film directed by Federico Fellini, for the "Cultural Exchange".

In the spring of 2018, in an interview with the Italian edition of Vanity Fair, Bertolucci announced that he was preparing a new film. He stated, "The theme will be love, let's call it that. In reality, the theme is communication and therefore also incommunicability. The favorite subject of Michelangelo Antonioni and the condition I found myself facing when I moved on from my films for the few, those of the sixties, to a broader cinema ready to meet a large audience."

=== As a screenwriter, producer and actor ===
Bertolucci wrote many screenplays, both for his own films and for films directed by others, two of which he also produced.

He was an actor in the film Golem: The Spirit of Exile, directed by Amos Gitai in 1992.

In 2026, Bertolucci's final screenplay, The Echo Chamber, written shortly before his death, was turned into a feature film directed by Italian filmmaker Andrea Pallaoro.

== Politics and personal beliefs ==
Bertolucci was an atheist, though he was fascinated by Buddhism. He advocated the practice of Transcendental Meditation: "We want to evoke the present and it is difficult to do it all together, we can only meditate, as in transcendental meditation. One of the most powerful experiences. Either you meditate or watch a good movie, then the two things start to touch ... ".

Bertolucci's films are often very political. He was a professed Marxist and, like Luchino Visconti, who similarly employed many foreign artists during the late 1960s, Bertolucci used his films to express his political views. His political films were preceded by others re-evaluating history. The Conformist (1970) criticised fascism, touched upon the relationship between nationhood and nationalism, as well as issues of popular taste and collective memory, all amid an international plot by Benito Mussolini to assassinate a politically active leftist professor of philosophy in Paris. 1900 also analyses the struggle of Left and Right.

On 27 September 2009, Bertolucci was one of the signatories of the appeal to the Swiss government to release Roman Polanski, who was being held awaiting extradition to the United States.

On Twitter on 24 April 2015, Bertolucci participated in #whomademyclothes, Fashion Revolution's anti-sweatshop campaign commemorating the 2013 Savar building collapse, the deadliest accident in the history of the garment industry.

=== Last Tango in Paris rape scene controversy ===
In later years, it was acknowledged that unlike Bernardo Bertolucci and his lead male Last Tango In Paris star Marlon, lead female Last Tango In Paris star Maria Schneider had no knowledge of the film's "butter" rape scene until just before it was shot. Brando is also acknowledged to have been the one who had the idea for the scene.

Schneider had been outspoken hostile to the scene, linking it to sexual violation.

In 2001, Schneider commented:

Last Tango ... first major role. In fact, it's a total coincidence. I was friends with Dominique Sanda. She would make the film with Jean-Louis Trintignant, but she was pregnant. She had a large picture with her of both of us. Bertolucci saw it. He made me do a casting ... I regretted my choice since the beginning of my career would have been sweeter, quieter. For Tango, I was not prepared. People have identified with a character that was not me. Butter, about saucy old pigs ... Even Marlon with his charisma and class, felt a bit violated, exploited a little in this film. He rejected it for years. And me, I felt it doubly.

In 2007, she further stated that:

I should have called my agent or had my lawyer come to the set because you can't force someone to do something that isn't in the script, but at the time, I didn't know that. Marlon said to me: 'Maria, don't worry, it's just a movie,' but during the scene, even though what Marlon was doing wasn't real, I was crying real tears. I felt humiliated and to be honest, I felt a little raped, both by Marlon and by Bertolucci. After the scene, Marlon didn't console me or apologise. Thankfully, there was just one take.

In 2013, two years after Schneider's death, Bertolucci admitted to have withheld knowledge of the "butter," while he and Brando did have firsthand knowledge of it, but also alleged that he withheld the information from her to generate a real "reaction of frustration and rage". Brando alleged that Bertolucci had wanted the characters to have real sex, but Brando and Schneider both said it was simulated. However, actress Jessica Tovey, in an article she wrote for The Guardian, argued that Bertolucci's defense of pursuing an artistic vision was "bogus" and that what occurred was "a violation." Tovey also observed that it is difficult to imagine the "roles being reversed; Brando being brutalized only to discover midway through filming that Schneider and Bertolucci had conspired to add an element of humiliation."

== Death ==
Bertolucci died of lung cancer in Rome on 26 November 2018, at the age of 77.

== Filmography ==
=== Feature film ===
Year	Title	Director	Writer
1962	La commare secca	Yes	Yes
1964	Before the Revolution	Yes	Yes
1967	Ballata da un miliardo	No	Yes
1968	Once Upon a Time in the West	No	Story
1968	Partner	Yes	Yes
1970	The Conformist	Yes	Yes
1972	Last Tango in Paris	Yes	Yes
1976	1900	Yes	Yes
1979	La Luna	Yes	Yes
1981	Tragedy of a Ridiculous Man	Yes	Yes
1987	The Last Emperor	Yes	Yes
1990	The Sheltering Sky	Yes	Yes
1993	Little Buddha	Yes	Story
1996	Stealing Beauty	Yes	Yes
1998	Besieged	Yes	Yes
2001	Triumph of Love	No	Yes
2003	The Dreamers	Yes	No
2012	Me and You	Yes	Yes
2026	The Echo Chamber	No	Yes

=== Short film ===
Year	Title	Director	Writer	Notes
1956	The Death of a Pig	Yes	Yes	
1956	The Cable	Yes	Yes	Also editor and cinematographer
1969	Agony	Yes	Yes	Segment of Love and Anger
2002	Histoire d'eaux	Yes	Yes	Segment of Ten Minutes Older: The Cello

Assistant director

- Accattone (1961)

Producer

- Sconcerto Rock (1982)
- Io con te non ci sto più (1983)
- Triumph of Love (2001)

=== Documentary works ===
Feature film

Year	Title	Director	Writer	Notes
1976	Il silenzio è complicità	No	Yes	Also editor
1984	L'addio a Enrico Berlinguer	Yes	Yes	

Short film

Year	Title	Notes
1966	Il canale	Also writer
1971	La salute è malata	
1989	Bologna	Segment of 12 registi per 12 città
2013	Venice 70: Future Reloaded	

Television

Year	Title	Director	Writer	Notes
1967	La via del petrolio	Yes	Yes	3 episodes
1970	The Spider's Stratagem	Yes	Yes	Television film
1985	Cartoline dalla Cina	Yes	Yes	Television short

== Awards and nominations ==
Year	Title	Accolades
1968	Partner	Nominated - Golden Lion
1969	Love and Anger	Nominated - Golden Bear
1970	The Conformist	National Society of Film Critics Award for Best Director; Nominated - Academy Award for Best Adapted Screenplay; Nominated - Golden Bear
1972	Last Tango in Paris	Nastro d'Argento for Best Director; Nominated - Academy Award for Best Director; Nominated - Directors Guild of America Award for Outstanding Directing; Nominated - Golden Globe Award for Best Director
1981	Tragedy of a Ridiculous Man	Nominated - Palme d'Or
1987	The Last Emperor	Academy Award for Best Director; Academy Award for Best Adapted Screenplay; BAFTA Award for Best Film; César Award for Best Foreign Film; David di Donatello for Best Director; David di Donatello for Best Screenplay; Directors Guild of America Award for Outstanding Directing; Golden Globe Award for Best Director; Golden Globe Award for Best Screenplay; Nastro d'Argento for Best Director; Nominated - BAFTA Award for Best Direction
1990	The Sheltering Sky	Nominated - Golden Globe Award for Best Director
1996	Stealing Beauty	Nominated - David di Donatello for Best Director; Nominated - Palme d'Or
1998	Besieged	Nominated - David di Donatello for Best Director
2012	Me and You	Nominated - David di Donatello for Best Film; Nominated - David di Donatello for Best Director; Nominated - David di Donatello for Best Screenplay

Other awards

- 1997: Honorable Mention at the Locarno International Film Festival
- 1997: Award special visual sensitivity in directing at Camerimage
- 1997: Award for collaborating director – director of photography (Vittorio Storaro) at Camerimage
- 1998: Recognition for free expression by the National Board of Review
- 1999: Life Time Achievement Award - 30th International Film Festival of India
- 2007: Golden Lion for his career at the Venice Film Festival
- 2011: Honorary Palme d'Or at Cannes Film Festival

Accolades for Bertolucci's theatrical films
Year	Title	Academy Awards		BAFTAs		Golden Globes		David di Donatellos	
Year	Title	Nominations	Wins	Nominations	Wins	Nominations	Wins	Nominations	Wins
1970	The Conformist	1				1		1	1
1972	Last Tango in Paris	2		1		2		1	1
1979	La Luna					1			
1987	The Last Emperor	9	9	11	3	5	4	10	9
1990	The Sheltering Sky			2	1	2	1		
1996	Stealing Beauty							5	
1998	Besieged							3	
2003	The Dreamers							1	
2012	Me and You							6	
Total		12	9	14	4	11	5	27	11

== Honours ==
- Grand-Officer of the Order of Merit of the Italian Republic of Italy (Rome, 2 June 1988), under proposal of the Council of Ministers.
- Gold Medal of the Italian Medal of Merit for Culture and Art of Italy (Rome, 21 February 2001). For having been able to combine poetry and great cinema as in the history of Italian cinema. For having known how to make different cultures and worlds dialogue, remaining strongly rooted in the culture of your country. For having been able to represent with passion and courage the political, social and cultural history of the last hundred years.
- Master's Degree Honoris Causa in History and Criticism of Arts and Performance of the University of Parma (Laurea Magistrale Honoris Causa in Storia e critica delle arti e dello spettacolo). Bernardo Bertolucci is one of the greatest and recognized filmmakers in the world. His cinema is a reference point for entire generations of directors, has thrilled millions of viewers, also arousing extensive cultural debates that have gone well beyond the film industry, and is the subject of significant historical and theoretical studies published in all of the major world languages.

== See also ==
- List of atheists in film, radio, television and theater
- "La Lega"
- Amos Gitai
