= I'm Not Scared (novel) =

2001 novel by Niccolò Ammaniti

- Cover of I'm Not Scared
- Author: Niccolò Ammaniti
- Original title: Io non ho paura
- Translator: Jonathan Hunt
- Language: Italian
- Genre: Fiction narrative
- Published: 2001 (Einaudi) (Italian); 2003 (Canongate Books) (English)
- Publication place: Italy
- Media type: Print
- Pages: 219
- ISBN: 9788806188672
- OCLC: 50525981

I'm Not Scared (Italian: Io non ho paura) is a novel by Niccolò Ammaniti. It is the third novel published by Ammaniti. In 2003, director Gabriele Salvatores adapted the novel into a film of the same name. The novel is about a boy in a small Southern Italian town in 1978 who discovers that his father and the rest of the townspeople have kidnapped a boy from a wealthy Northern family.

The story portrays the protagonist’s loss of childhood innocence and his transition to acting upon his own conscience, which leads him to go against his own father and the environment in which he grew up. The novel was originally published in Italian in 2001 and was first published in English in 2003. Ammaniti’s work received generally positive reviews from literary critics in both Italian and English language publications.

== Plot ==
The novel takes place in 1978 in a fictitious Southern Italian village called Acqua Traverse. Michele, the nine-year-old protagonist, loses a race against the other village children to an abandoned house in the countryside. As the loser he must suffer a punishment chosen by the group, but instead Skull, the group’s leader, insists that their friend Barbara must show her private parts as punishment. Michele intervenes as she unbuttons her pants and says he should face the punishment as the loser of the race. Skull decides that Michele must traverse the dangerous second floor of the house, jump out of the window onto the tree and climb down.

As he climbs down, Michele falls and discovers a covered hole in the ground. When he looks inside he sees a boy lying in the dirt. Disturbed, Michele assumes that the boy is dead, and he bicycles home with his sister. When they arrive home, they find their father, Pino, who has returned home from his work as a truck driver. Pino tells Michele he must defeat him at arm-wrestling to have dinner, and while they wrestle Pino calls him a sissy and says he has ricotta for muscles. They eventually have dinner, however, and Pino unveils the present he had brought for the children, a model gondola from Venice.

During the following week, Michele visits the hole two times. The first time, he realizes that the boy is alive, and he discovers a bowl with the same design as one his mother owns in the abandoned house. The second time, he sees Felice, Skull’s brother, leaving the house in his car. This time Michele is able to talk to the boy, who is delirious and startles Michele by shouting “I’m dead! I’m dead!”

Michele wakes up the next night to go to the bathroom, but he overhears a heated conversation going on in the kitchen involving Michele’s father Pino, Pino’s friend Sergio, Felice, and a few other townspeople. Sergio yells at Felice and Pino, calling the latter an imbecile. At one point they all quiet down to watch the daily news on TV, which displays a photo of the boy that Michele found in the hole. Michele peers in at the TV as the broadcaster says that the boy, Filippo, is the son of a wealthy industrialist, Giovanni Carducci and that he was kidnapped two months ago. Filippo’s mother appears on TV and pleads with the kidnappers not to cut off her son’s ear as they had threatened, and she says that her husband is prepared to pay the ransom. Pino says they will now cut off both of Filippo’s ears instead, which shocks and disturbs Michele.

A few days later, Michele is playing with his friend Salvatore and tells Salvatore the secret of the boy in the hole in exchange for two toy soccer kits. Michele soon returns to see Filippo in the hole, but Felice catches him because Salvatore had told him Michele’s secret in exchange for driving lessons. Felice brings Michele back to his house and gets into a fight with Michele’s mother, who is angry about how he has hit her son. Pino arrives and beats up Felice while Sergio tries to restrain him. Later that night, Pino tells Michele that he must not go to visit Filippo again.

Over the next week, the children keep on playing outdoors while, strangely, the adults of the village all remain indoors. It has become clear that the police are closing in on the kidnappers, and one night Michele is awoken by yelling in the kitchen. He overhears a heated argument between Felice and Sergio. They are now holding Filippo in a grotto near a dried-up riverbed. Pino suggests that they return the kidnapped boy to the authorities. But Sergio overrules him, and the group gets into an argument about who will have to kill the boy. Pino pulls out a few matches, breaks them in half, and tells the group that whoever picks the match without the head will have to shoot the boy.

Before he can see on whom the responsibility falls, Michele jumps out of his bedroom window and gets on his bicycle to rush to Filippo’s rescue. Michele arrives at the grotto where Filippo is held, finds Filippo and helps him escape. However, Michele cannot exit the grotto in time before the kidnappers arrive, so he tries to hide. His father Pino walks in, and because of the darkness of the night, he shoots Michele, having mistaken him for Filippo. Michele loses consciousness, but he wakes up a few minutes later in his father’s arms. Pino is pleading with him to stay awake while a police helicopter hovers overhead. Michele again loses consciousness.

== Major themes ==
Ellen Nerenberg from Wesleyan University argues that the author uses the first-person narration and a childlike style to emphasize the protagonist's innocence. Nerenberg contends that a main theme of the novel is the solidarity of youth, exemplified by the bond that forms between the protagonist and the kidnapped child. Additionally, she argues that another theme of I'm Not Scared is the individual's departure from family and societal norms, as evidenced in Michele's resistance to the violence and negativity of his environment and his father.

Giuliana Adamo from Trinity College Dublin discusses the use of first-person narration as a tool to convey the huge confusion and overwhelm felt by the young boy protagonist. She also argues that some of the main themes of the book are the discovery of oneself in a bitter and heart-wrenching way, the application of one's conscience, and the strength to make decisions that go against the culture and environment in which the protagonist was raised.

Literary critics have highlighted the strain on Italian family life caused by regional and social inequality, as demonstrated by the kidnapping of a wealthy Northern boy by poor Southern Italians, as a main theme of the novel. The loss of childhood innocence has also been cited as a central topic.

== Publication history ==
The Italian-language, original version of the novel was published in 2001 by Einaudi publishing company in Turin, Italy.

The English-language translation, completed by Jonathan Hunt, was published in 2003 by Canongate in Edinburgh, Scotland, and in 2004 by Anchor Books in New York, NY.

== Reception ==
Ammaniti was nominated for the Best Motion Picture Screenplay at the 2005 Edgar Award for the novel being the screenplay of the picture I'm Not Scared. He also won the 2001 Viareggio Prize.

The book has sold more than 700,000 copies since its publication in 2001, and has been translated into twenty languages.

=== English-language reception ===
The Guardian described the experience of reading I'm Not Scared as "closer to that of such Italian neo-realist masterpieces as De Sica's Bicycle Thieves as they appear to us now, imbued with a lyrical but utterly unsentimental nostalgia for lost innocence."

Michael Dirda of the Washington Post describes Ammaniti’s work as engaging, suspenseful and thrilling.

Los Angeles Times critic Nick Owchar lauds Ammaniti’s construction of the plot and his success in capturing the horror of a story from a child’s perspective.

Lawrence Venuti of the New York Times Book Review notes the many American cultural references and the influence of American novels on the style of I’m Not Scared. He argues that the novel provides deep insight into themes of class and geographical divisions in Italy, and he applauds the work of Jonathan Hunt in translating the novel to English while capturing the nuances of Ammaniti’s original narration from the child’s perspective.

John De Falbe of The Spectator argues that I’m Not Scared offers a superficial portrayal of a horrible situation facing a young boy and that Ammaniti does not deeply analyze the ethical dilemmas faced by the protagonist.

=== Italian-language reception ===
Paolo Mauri, a literary critic for la Repubblica, contends that the part of the novel dealing with childhood innocence and dynamics within a group of children was fresh and novel, while the part about the kidnapping and television spectacle-like drama was ordinary and likely catered to Ammaniti’s international audience.

Italian literary critic Cesare Segre writes that the book was distressing yet captivating, and compliments Ammaniti’s writing style for being steady while avoiding simplistic ups and downs.

== Adaptations ==
The novel was adapted into a film, for which Ammaniti wrote the screenplay. The film was released in Italy in 2003.

A mini-series based on the novel was released by Netflix on 8 July, 2026. This adaptation is looser than its 2003 counterpart, as I'm Not Afraid (Spanish: No Tengo Miedo) takes place in a rural Veracruz village during the 1986 FIFA World Cup. According to series director Alex Zuno, the production team wanted to set it during the World Cup to coincide with the 2026 World Cup near the time of release. He further specified that showrunner Ernesto Contreras ultimately chose his home province of Veracruz due to the, "[coffee] plague there that justified the precariousness and desperation of the characters."
