= Anna (novel) =

2015 novel by Niccolò Ammaniti

- First edition (Italian) cover
- Author: Niccolò Ammaniti
- Original title: Anna
- Translator: Jonathan Hunt
- Language: Italian
- Genre: Fiction narrative
- Published: 2015 (Einaudi) (Italian); 2017 (Canongate Books) (English)
- Publication place: Italy
- Media type: Print
- Pages: 261
- ISBN: 9781782118343
- OCLC: 1000450599

Anna is a 2015 post-apocalyptic fictional novel by Niccolò Ammaniti.

It follows thirteen-year-old Anna in a post-apocalyptic Sicily where a virus has wiped out all adults. She searches for her kidnapped brother Astor, facing peril and discovering her resilience. The novel explores survival and the impact of a world without adults.

== Plot ==
In 2016, a mysterious disease called the "Red" spreads worldwide from Belgium, causing sterility and death, marked by red spots on the infected. It is incurable, and most of the population is quickly wiped out. Only children are immune until puberty, leaving them to survive alone in a desolate world. By sixteen, they too die as the disease manifests.

In 2020, thirteen-year-old Anna and her younger brother Astor live on a hidden farm in Sicily, devastated by the Red and fires. Anna cares for Astor, using a notebook from their mother for survival tips. She keeps him indoors with stories of monsters outside. One day, she encounters a wild dog, wounds it, but later helps it survive.

Returning home, Anna finds the farm destroyed and Astor kidnapped by a gang led by Angelica and the Bear, who recruit or kill other children for supplies. Anna sets out to find him, joined by the now-tame dog, named Coccolone, and a boy named Pietro, who believes that a pair of Adidas shoes can cure the Red. They reach the gang's hideout, the Grand Hotel Terme Elise, where a supposed healer, Picciridduna, resides.

Anna finds Astor, but he refuses to leave, accusing her of lying. During a festival, Picciridduna, an unintelligent hermaphrodite, is sacrificed to supposedly cure the children, but it fails. Anna, Pietro, and Astor leave for Cefalù with Coccolone. On Anna's birthday, she gets her first period but hides it, fearing the Red's onset.

While traveling to the mainland, Pietro shows symptoms and, after a severe accident, asks Anna to end his suffering. Anna and Astor reach Messina and cross to the mainland, finding it as desolate as Sicily. They discover the Adidas shoes and each wear one, hoping they hold a cure.

== Theme ==
Niccolò Ammaniti conceived the novel from a purely biological-behavioural perspective, pondering what children would do if left to their own devices. This idea led him to imagine a world where, for some reason, adults had disappeared. The concept raised numerous questions about the children's survival, which became a central theme of the story.

== Publication history ==
- Ammaniti, Niccolò (2015). Anna (in Italian). Turin: Einaudi. ISBN 978-88-06-22775-3.
- Ammaniti, Niccolò (2016). Anna (in Dutch). Translated by Maris, Etta. Amsterdam: Lebowski Publishers. ISBN 9789048828418.
- Ammaniti, Niccolò (2016). Anna (in Spanish). Translated by Salmerón, Juan Manuel. Barcelona: Anagrama. ISBN 9788433937247.
- Ammaniti, Niccolò (2016). Anna (in French). Translated by Bouzaher, Myriem. Paris: Bernard Grasset. ISBN 9782246861645.
- Ammaniti, Niccolò (2017). Anna. Translated by Hunt, Jonathan. Edinburgh: Canongate. ISBN 9781782118350.
- Ammaniti, Niccolò (2018). Anna (in German). Translated by Ruby, Luis. Munich: Eisele. ISBN 9783961610099.

== Adaptation ==
In 2021, Anna was adapted into a TV show of the same name. The series, which was directed by Ammaniti, aired on Sky Italia.
