= Oreste Rizzini =

Italian voice actor (1940–2008)

- Born: 27 March 1940; Milan, Italy
- Died: 18 March 2008 (aged 67); Rome, Italy
- Occupations: Actor; voice actor; radio host; author; adapter; dubbing director; stage director
- Years active: 1960–2008
- Spouse(s): Viviana Toniolo (divorced); Fiorina Piscopo
- Children: 2

Oreste Rizzini (27 March 1940 – 18 March 2008) was an Italian actor and voice actor.

== Biography ==
Born in Milan, Rizzini began his career as a stage actor in the early 1960s, working alongside figures such as Vittorio Gassman, Mariangela Melato and Luca Ronconi, also acting in television and working for the radio industry, where he came to establish himself as a performer, impressionist, host and author.

As a voice actor, Rizzini was well known for dubbing the voice of Michael Douglas in many of his films, also providing the Italian voices of Bill Murray in the Ghostbusters films, Danny Trejo in Spy Kids, Paul Hogan in almost all his roles and Michael Caine, Gene Hackman and Rade Šerbedžija in some of their films. In animation, he voiced King Randor and Skeletor in the Italian dub of He-Man and the Masters of the Universe as well as Lord Farquaad in Shrek. He also performed and served as a voice director for Guido Manuli's animated film about Giuseppe Garibaldi, L'eroe dei due mondi, co-written with Maurizio Nichetti and released in 1994, the same year he narrated the documentary film Succede un Quarantotto or Italy After the War.

Rizzini also had a brief yet successful experience as a stage director, with the grotesque play Dottor sale in zucca e mister zucchero mannaro, written by Paola Bedinelli.

== Death ==
Rizzini died of stomach cancer in Rome on 18 March 2008, nine days shy of his 68th birthday. He was later interred in a cemetery in Capalbio.

== Filmography ==
=== Film ===
- Christmas Present (1986) - voice
- Noistottus (1987) - voice
- Evelina e i suoi figli (1990)
- Succede un quarantotto - voice (1993)
- L'eroe dei due mondi (1994) - voice
- The Comeback (La rentrée, 2001)

=== Television ===
- Tre quarti di luna - TV play (1971)
- Don Giovanni - TV play (1973)
- La traccia verde - TV miniseries (1975–1976)
- Nella città vampira. Drammi gotici - TV miniseries (1978)
- Colpo di grazia alla sezione III – TV film (1981)
- George Sand - TV miniseries (1981)

== Dubbing roles ==
=== Animation ===
- Lord Farquaad in Shrek, Shrek the Third, Shrek 4-D
- Narrator in Hercules and Disney's Hercules: The Animated Series
- King Randor (2nd voice) and Skeletor (3rd voice) in He-Man and the Masters of the Universe
- Scooter and Joe Snow in It's a Very Merry Muppet Christmas Movie
- Seti I in The Prince of Egypt
- The Angry Scientist in Sheep in the Big City
- The Falcon in Stuart Little 2
- Lord Qin in Mulan II
- Peter Venkman in The Real Ghostbusters

=== Live action ===
- Jack Colton in Romancing the Stone, The Jewel of the Nile
- Peter Venkman in Ghostbusters, Ghostbusters II
- James Braddock in Missing in Action 2: The Beginning, Braddock: Missing in Action III
- Mick Dundee in Crocodile Dundee, Crocodile Dundee II
- Isador "Machete" Cortez in Spy Kids, Spy Kids 2: The Island of Lost Dreams
- Denethor in The Lord of the Rings: The Two Towers, The Lord of the Rings: The Return of the King
- Nathan R. Conrad in Don't Say a Word
- Zach in A Chorus Line
- Oliver Rose in The War of the Roses
- Ed Leland in Shining Through
- Nick Curran in Basic Instinct
- Charles Remington in The Ghost and the Darkness
- Nicholas van Orton in The Game
- Robert Wakefield in Traffic
- Sally Ann Santa in It's a Very Merry Muppet Christmas Movie
- Mr. Burmeister in One Night at McCool's
- Steve Tobias in The In-Laws
- Alex Gromberg in It Runs in the Family
- Pete Garrison in The Sentinel
- Bob Thompson in You, Me and Dupree
- Oscar "Manny" Manheim in Runaway Train
- Leo F. Drummond in The Rainmaker
- Thomas Brian Reynolds in Enemy of the State
- John McClane in Die Hard 2
- Bud Newman in The Santa Clause 3: The Escape Clause
- Alex Gates in Blood and Wine
- William Cleary in Wedding Crashers
- William Earle in Batman Begins
- Lando Calrissian in Star Wars: Episode VI – Return of the Jedi
- Tion Medon in Star Wars: Episode III – Revenge of the Sith
- Kreacher in Harry Potter and the Order of the Phoenix
- Bob Harris in Lost in Translation
- Don Johnston in Broken Flowers
- Elmer C. Robinson in Lonely Hearts
