= Italo Petriccione =

Italian cinematographer (born 1958)

- Born: 1958 (age 67–68); Milan, Italy
- Occupation: Cinematographer
- Years active: 1983—present

Italo Petriccione is an Italian cinematographer who has worked with directors Gabriele Salvatores, Paolo Virzì, and Leonardo Pieraccioni. He has been nominated six times for both the David di Donatello for Best Cinematography and the Nastro d'Argento for Best Cinematography, winning both awards for the film adaptation of I'm Not Scared.

== Selected filmography ==
- Marrakech Express (1989)
- On Tour (1990)
- Mediterraneo (1991)
- Puerto Escondido (1992)
- Sud (1993)
- Black Holes (1995)
- Ovosodo (1997)
- The Bride's Journey (1997)
- Nirvana (1997)
- My Best Friend's Wife (1998)
- Denti (2000)
- Three Wives (2001)
- Amnèsia (2002)
- Suddenly Paradise (2003)
- I'm Not Scared (2003)
- Quo Vadis, Baby? (2005)
- The Fever (2005)
- Come into the Light (2005)
- A Beautiful Wife (2007)
- As God Commands (2008)
- Generation 1000 Euros (2009)
- Happy Family (2010)
- When the Night (2011)
- Siberian Education (2013)
- The Invisible Boy (2014)
- Latin Lover (2015)
- The Invisible Boy: Second Generation (2018)
- Volare (2019)
- A Bookshop in Paris (2021)
- The Children's Train (2024)

== Awards ==
- Nastro d'Argento for Best Cinematography (2003)
- David di Donatello for Best Cinematography (2004)
