= Children of Hannibal =

- Directed by: Davide Ferrario
- Written by: Davide Ferrario; Diego Abatantuono; Sergio Rubini
- Cinematography: Giovanni Cavallini
- Music by: Almamegretta; Fabio Piazzalunga; Damiano Rota; Daniele Sepe
- Release date: 1998
- Language: Italian

Children of Hannibal (Italian: Figli di Annibale) is a 1998 Italian comedy film written and directed by Davide Ferrario.

== Cast ==
- Diego Abatantuono as Tommaso
- Silvio Orlando as Domenico
- Valentina Cervi as Rita
- Flavio Insinna as Orfeo
- Ugo Conti as Ermes
- Elena Giove as Carmela
- Pietro Ghislandi as Bank Clerk
- Caterina Sylos Labini as Private Policewoman
