= The Wedding Director =

2006 film

- Film poster
- Directed by: Marco Bellocchio
- Written by: Marco Bellocchio
- Produced by: Marco Bellocchio
- Starring: Sergio Castellitto; Donatella Finocchiaro; Sami Frey; Bruno Cariello; Maurizio Donadoni; Claudia Zanella; Silvia Ajelli; Corinne Castelli; Simona Nobili; Gianni Cavina
- Cinematography: Pasquale Mari
- Edited by: Francesca Calvelli
- Release date: 21 April 2006
- Running time: 97 minutes
- Country: Italy
- Language: Italian

The Wedding Director (Italian: Il regista di matrimoni) is a 2006 Italian drama film directed by Marco Bellocchio. It was screened in the Un Certain Regard section at the 2006 Cannes Film Festival.

== Cast ==
- Sergio Castellitto - Franco Elica
- Donatella Finocchiaro - Bona di Gravina
- Sami Frey - Principe di Gravina
- Gianni Cavina - Smamma
- Maurizio Donadoni - Micetti
- Bruno Cariello - Enzo Baiocco
- Simona Nobili - Maddalena Baiocco
- Claudia Zanella - Chiara Elica
- Corinne Castelli - Fara Domani / Lucia Mondella
- Silvia Ajelli - Gioia Rottofreno / Monaca di Monza
- Aurora Peres - Sposa
- Giacomo Guernieri - Sposo
- Carmelo Galati - Luigi
