= A Boy from Calabria =

- DVD cover
- Directed by: Luigi Comencini
- Written by: Demetrio Casile; Francesca Comencini; Luigi Comencini
- Starring: Gian Maria Volontè; Diego Abatantuono; Thérèse Liotard
- Cinematography: Franco Di Giacomo
- Edited by: Nino Baragli
- Release date: 11 September 1987
- Running time: 108 minutes
- Countries: Italy; France
- Languages: Italian; French

Un ragazzo di Calabria (internationally released as A Boy from Calabria) is a 1987 Italian comedy drama film by Luigi Comencini.

It entered the main competition at the 44th Venice Film Festival in which it won the Pasinetti Award for Best Actor (to Gian Maria Volonté).

== Cast ==
- Gian Maria Volonté as Felice
- Diego Abatantuono as Nicola
- Thérèse Liotard as Mariuccia
- Santo Polimeno as Mimì
