= Christmas Present (film) =

1986 film by Pupi Avati

- Italian theatrical release poster by Enzo Sciotti
- Directed by: Pupi Avati
- Written by: Pupi Avati
- Produced by: Antonio Avati
- Starring: Diego Abatantuono, Alessandro Haber, Carlo Delle Piane
- Cinematography: Pasquale Rachini
- Edited by: Amedeo Salfa
- Music by: Riz Ortolani
- Distributed by: SACIS Film
- Release date: 1986
- Running time: 101 minutes
- Country: Italy
- Language: Italian

Regalo di Natale, internationally released as Christmas Present, is a 1986 Italian comedy-drama film written and directed by Pupi Avati. It entered the 43° Venice Film Festival, in which Carlo Delle Piane won the Volpi Cup for Best Actor. For his performance in this film Diego Abatantuono won a Nastro d'Argento for Best supporting Actor. The film has a sequel, Christmas Rematch.

== Plot ==
The day before Christmas: a group of friends can be found, as tradition, rich in the house of one of them, for a game of poker. Each of the four men, including a mysterious lawyer, has problems in families, and trying to scrape together a Christmas game in a considerable sum in order to live better. But fate has a special plan for each day players.

== Cast ==
- Diego Abatantuono as Franco Mattioli
- Gianni Cavina as Ugo Cavara
- Alessandro Haber as Gabriele Bagnoli
- Carlo Delle Piane as Antonio Sant'Elia
- George Eastman as Stefano Bertoni
- Kristina Sevieri as Martina
- Rossella Como
- Oreste Rizzini as Narrator

== See also ==
- List of Christmas films
- List of Italian films of 1986
