= Niccolò Ammaniti =

Italian writer (born 1966)

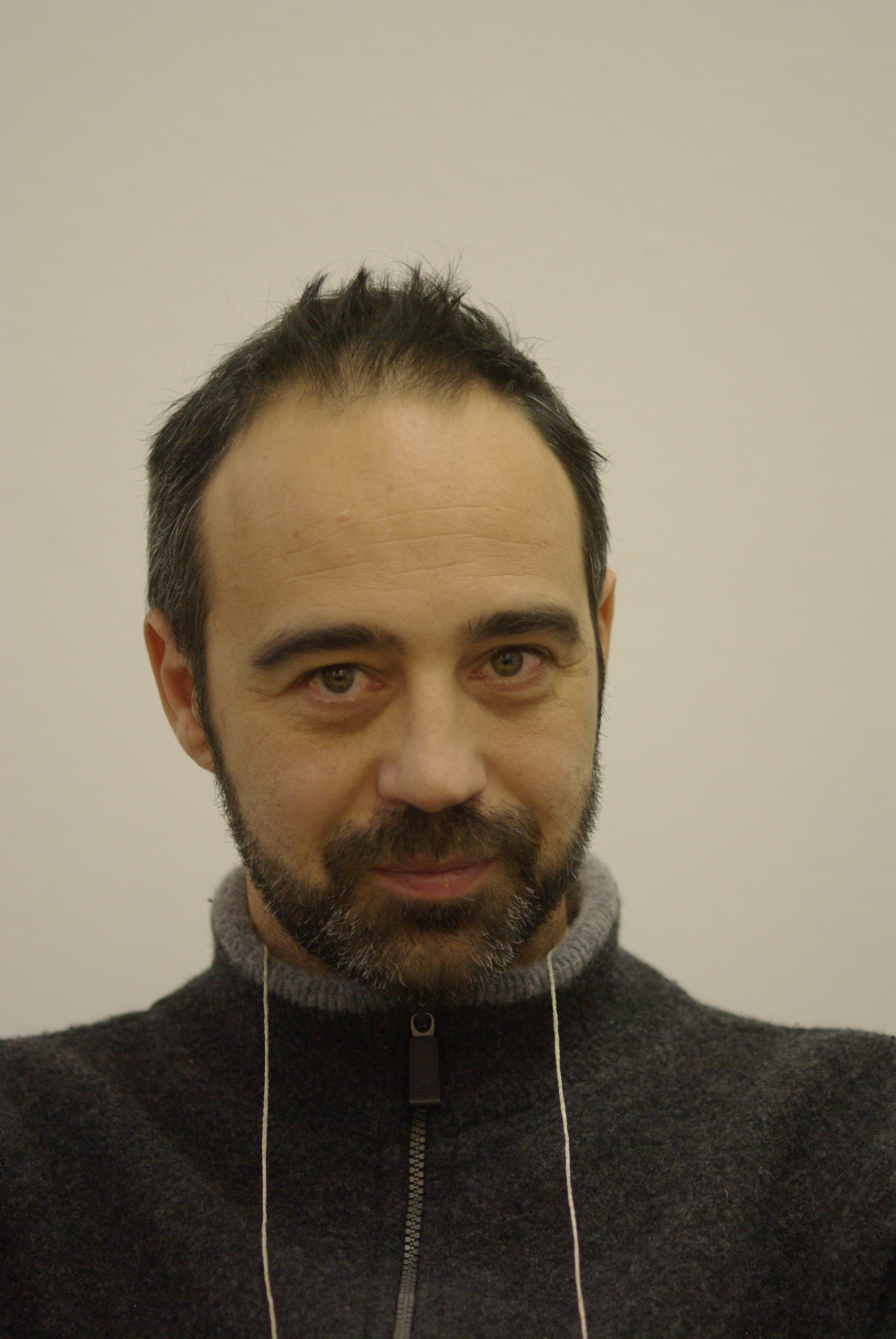
- Ammaniti in 2010
- Born: 25 September 1966 (age 60); Rome, Italy
- Spouse: Lorenza Indovina (m. 2005)
- Writing career
- Notable awards: Viareggio Prize 2001 I'm Not Scared 2023 La vita intima; Strega Prize 2007 ''As God Commands; Premio Strega
- Website: Official website

Niccolò Ammaniti (Italian pronunciation: [nikkoˈlɔ ammaˈniːti]) is an Italian writer, winner of the Premio Strega in 2007 for As God Commands (also published under the title The Crossroads). He became noted in 2001 with the publication of I'm Not Scared (Io non ho paura), a novel which was later made into a movie directed by Gabriele Salvatores.

== Biography ==
Niccolò Ammaniti was born in Rome on 25 September 1966. He studied Biological Sciences at university, and though he did not complete his degree, his first novel, Branchie (published by Ediesse in 1994, and then by Einaudi in 1997), drew from his unfinished dissertation. In 1999, Branchie was adapted into a movie with the same title. In 1995, Ammaniti and his father Massimo published the essay Nel nome del figlio. In 1996, he appeared with his sister in the low-budget movie Growing Artichokes in Mimongo.

A short novel written with Luisa Brancaccio for the anthology Gioventù Cannibale edited by Daniele Brolli came out in 1996, as did a collection of short stories, Fango. Fango was shortlisted as a finalist work at the 1997 Premio Nazionale di Narrativa Bergamo. In 1999, Ammaniti published the novel Steal You Away (Ti prendo e ti porto via), followed by the 2001 I'm Not Scared (Io non ho paura), which won the 2001 Viareggio Prize and was adapted into a film directed by Gabriele Salvatores in 2003.

In 2006, he published As God Commands (Come Dio comanda), which won the Strega Prize. The novel was adapted into a movie, once again directed by Gabriele Salvatores. In 2009, he published Let the Games Begin (Che la festa cominci), and in 2010 Me and You (Io e te), which was later adapted into a movie directed by Bernardo Bertolucci. The script, co-written by Bertolucci, Ammaniti, and others, was nominated for Best Screenplay at the 2013 David di Donatello awards and at the 2013 Italian Golden Globe.

In 2015, he published the novel Anna, which six years later was adapted into a TV show aired on Sky Italia and directed by Ammaniti himself. His directorial debut came in 2017 with the TV series The Miracle, released one year later, a project he both created and co-directed alongside Francesco Munzi and Lucio Pellegrini. In 2023, eight years since his last novel, he published La vita intima, winning the Viareggio Prize again, 22 years after his initial recognition with I'm Not Scared.

== Works ==
=== Novels ===
- Ammaniti, Niccolò (1994). Branchie (in Italian). Rome: Ediesse. ISBN 88-230-0135-8.
- Ammaniti, Niccolò (1996). Fango (in Italian). Milan: Mondadori. ISBN 88-04-40667-4.
- Ammaniti, Niccolò (1999). Ti prendo e ti porto via [Steal You Away] (in Italian). Milan: Mondadori. ISBN 88-04-46824-6.
- Ammaniti, Niccolò (2001). Io non ho paura [I'm Not Scared] (in Italian). Turin: Einaudi. ISBN 88-06-14210-0.
- Ammaniti, Niccolò (2006). Come Dio comanda [As God Commands] (in Italian). Milan: Mondadori. ISBN 88-04-50279-7.
- Ammaniti, Niccolò (2009). Che la festa cominci [Let the Games Begin] (in Italian). Turin: Einaudi. ISBN 978-88-06-19101-6.
- Ammaniti, Niccolò (2010). Io e te [Me and You] (in Italian). Turin: Einaudi. ISBN 978-88-06-20680-2.
- Ammaniti, Niccolò (2015). Anna [Anna] (in Italian). Turin: Einaudi. ISBN 978-88-06-22775-3.
- Ammaniti, Niccolò (2023). La vita intima (in Italian). Turin: Einaudi. ISBN 978-88-06-25515-2.

=== Audiobooks ===
- Ammaniti, Niccolò; Manzini, Antonio (2008). Giochiamo? Due racconti letti dagli autori (CD) (in Italian). Milan: Mondadori. ISBN 978-88-04-58405-6.

=== Documentaries ===
- Ammaniti, Niccolò (director) (2014). The Good Life (Motion picture) (in Italian). ISBN 978-88-07-74125-8.

=== Graphic novels ===
- Ammaniti, Niccolò (w), Fabbri, Davidé (a). Fa un po' male (2004). Einaudi, ISBN 8806168150, (in Italian).

=== Essays ===
- Ammaniti, Massimo; Ammaniti, Niccolò (1995). Nel nome del figlio. L'adolescenza raccontata da un padre e da un figlio (in Italian). Milan: Mondadori. ISBN 88-04-39339-4.

=== Radio dramas ===
- Ammaniti, Niccolò (1997). Anche il sole fa schifo (Radio broadcast) (in Italian). Rai-Eri. ISBN 88-397-0987-8.

=== Short stories in anthologies ===
- Ammaniti, Niccolò (1993). "La figlia di Siva". La giungla sotto l'asfalto (in Italian). Ediesse.
- Ammaniti, Niccolò; Brancaccio, Luisa (1996). "Seratina". In Brolli, Daniele (ed.). Gioventù cannibale (in Italian). Turin: Einaudi. ISBN 88-06-14268-2.
- Ammaniti, Niccolò (1997). "Alba tragica". In Lippi, Giuseppe; Evangelisti, Valerio (eds.). Tutti i denti del mostro sono perfetti (in Italian). Milan: Mondadori. ISBN 88-04-43806-1.
- Ammaniti, Niccolò; D'Alessandro, Jaime (1998). "Enchanted Music & Light Records". Il fagiano Jonathan Livingston. Manifesto contro la new age (in Italian). Rome: Minimum Fax. ISBN 88-86568-53-3.
- Ammaniti, Niccolò (2000). "L'amico di Jeffrey Dahmer è l'amico mio". In Brolli, Daniele (ed.). Italia odia (in Italian). Milan: Mondadori. ISBN 88-06-14268-2.
- Ammaniti, Niccolò (2005). "Sei il mio tesoro". In De Cataldo, Giancarlo (ed.). Crimini (in Italian). Turin: Einaudi. ISBN 88-06-17576-9.

=== TV series ===
- Ammaniti, Niccolò (Creator); Ammaniti, Niccolò (Director); Munzi, Francesco (Director); Pellegrini, Lucio (Director) (2018). Il miracolo [The Miracle] (Television production) (in Italian).
- Ammaniti, Niccolò (Creator and Director) (2021). Anna (Television production) (in Italian).

== Film adaptations ==
- Risi, Marco (Director) (1998). Kaputt Mundi (in Italian).
- Ranieri Martinotti, Francesco (Director) (1999). Branchie (in Italian).
- Salvatores, Gabriele (Director) (2003). I'm Not Scared (in Italian).
- Infascelli, Alex (Director) (2004). The Vanity Serum (in Italian).
- Salvatores, Gabriele (Director) (2008). As God Commands (in Italian).
- Bertolucci, Bernardo (Director) (2012). Me and You (in Italian).
