= Singing Behind Screens =

- Directed by: Ermanno Olmi
- Written by: Ermanno Olmi
- Starring: Jun Ichikawa; Bud Spencer
- Cinematography: Fabio Olmi
- Music by: Han Yong
- Release date: 2003
- Running time: 98 minutes
- Country: Italy
- Language: Italian

Singing Behind Screens (Italian: Cantando dietro i paraventi) is a 2003 Italian adventure-drama film written and directed by Ermanno Olmi, loosely inspired to real life events of Chinese pirate Ching Shih. The film won three David di Donatello and four Nastro d'Argento Awards.

== Plot ==
A young man enters a brothel and sees a staged narration of a Chinese folk tale concerning a female pirate.

== Cast ==
- Jun Ichikawa as Widow Ching
- Bud Spencer as Old Captain Andorrano
- Sally Ming Zeo Ni as Confident
- Camillo Grassi as Nostromo
- Makoto Kobayashi as Admiral Ching

== See also ==
- List of Italian films of 2003
