= What Will Happen to Us =

What Will Happen to Us -Che ne sarà di noi-
- Directed by: Giovanni Veronesi
- Written by: Silvio Muccino; Giovanni Veronesi
- Produced by: Aurelio De Laurentiis
- Starring: Silvio Muccino; Violante Placido; Elio Germano; Giuseppe Sanfelice
- Cinematography: Fabio Zamarion
- Edited by: Claudio di Mauro
- Music by: Andrea Guerra
- Release date: 2004
- Running time: 100 min
- Country: Italy
- Language: Italian

What Will Happen to Us (Italian: Che ne sarà di noi) is a 2004 Italian romantic drama film directed by Giovanni Veronesi.

== Plot ==
In Rome three friends end to give the exams in last year of grammar high school, and grant a lovely summer holiday in Greece, on the island of Santorini. Matteo is a young problematic and indifferent, which is hoping for a ransom of his controversial personality through love. Manuel is a gruff guy who hates his late father, and hopes for a better future for himself, because he does not want to work at the pet store with her mother. Paolo, nicknamed Pio, is the shiest of the group and is in search of himself and love. In Greece the three know beautiful girls and suffer betrayals of love. At the end of the movie, only Manuel discovers himself, becoming more loving and positive towards life.

== Cast ==
- Silvio Muccino: Matteo
- Violante Placido: Carmen
- Giuseppe Sanfelice: Paolo
- Elio Germano: Manuel
- Valeria Solarino: Bea
- Enrico Silvestrin: Sandro
- Katy Louise Saunders: Valentina
- Myriam Catania: Monica
- Pino Quartullo: Paolo's father
- Rocco Papaleo: Doorman
- Paola Tiziana Cruciani: Manuel's mother

== See also ==
- List of Italian films of 2004
