= Christmas Rematch =

- Directed by: Pupi Avati
- Written by: Pupi Avati
- Produced by: Anronio Avati
- Starring: Diego Abatantuono; Carlo Delle Piane; Alessandro Haber
- Cinematography: Pasquale Rachini
- Edited by: Amedeo Salfa
- Music by: Riz Ortolani
- Distributed by: Medusa Film
- Release date: 2004
- Running time: 99 minutes
- Country: Italy
- Language: Italian

La rivincita di Natale, internationally released as Christmas Rematch, is a 2004 Italian comedy-drama film directed by Pupi Avati. It is the sequel of the 1986 film Christmas Present.

== Plot ==
In Bologna, Franco, Lele, Stefano and Ugo, once old friends once, reunite for the Christmas holidays. Franco, who was defeated 18 years before, is now a great industrialist and film producer, and he is going to have the rematch of a poker game played many years ago. Initially, Franco loses many euros, but after a while, he starts winning. At the end of the game his friends leave defeated, and Franco realizes he is left alone because of a game because now he has lost the esteem of his dear comrades.

== Cast ==
- Diego Abatantuono: Franco Mattioli
- Gianni Cavina: Ugo Cavara
- Alessandro Haber: Gabriele Bagnoli
- Carlo Delle Piane: avvocato Santelia
- George Eastman: Stefano Bertoni
- Petra Khruz: Elisa Delai
- Osvaldo Ruggieri: Renato Delai
- Eliana Miglio: Mariarosa Boscovich
