= Diego Abatantuono =

Italian actor and screenwriter

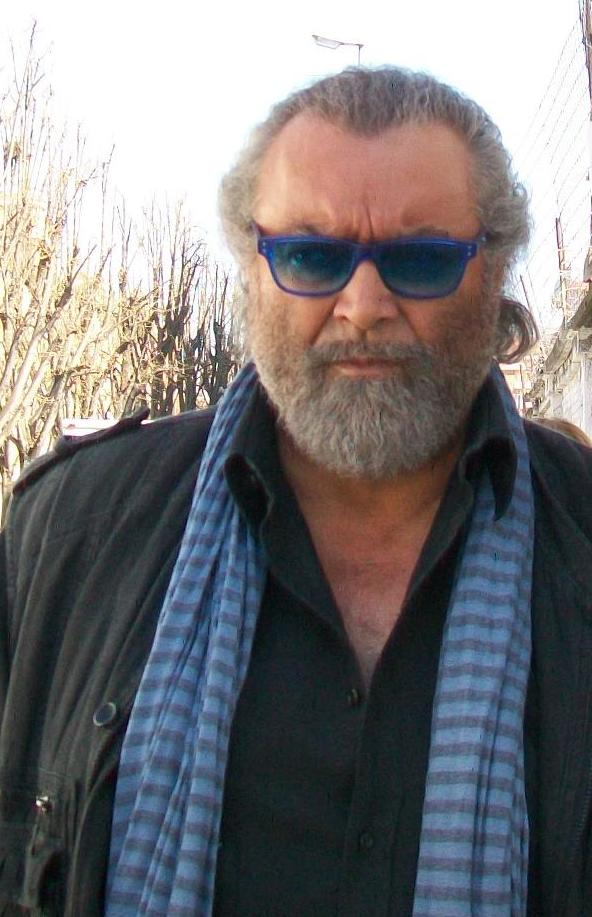
- Abatantuono in 2016
- Born: Diego Abatantuono; 20 May 1955 (age 71); Milan, Italy
- Occupation: Actor
- Years active: 1976–present
- Website: Official website

Diego Abatantuono (born 20 May 1955) is an Italian cinema and theatre actor, comedian and screenwriter, three-time winner of the Nastro d'Argento.

== Biography and career ==
Abatantuono was born in Milan to a father of Apulian origin and a mother from Como. The latter worked as a wardrober in a Milanese jazz and later cabaret club, Derby, whose owner was Abatantuono's uncle. He started to work at Derby first in lighting, then as an artistic director and later as an actor.

His first approach to cinema took place thanks to the comedic group I Gatti di Vicolo Miracoli, who brought him with them to audition. Here he was noticed by director Romolo Guerrieri, who offered him a part in the film Young, Violent, Dangerous. He participated in comedies such as "Saxofone", Fantozzi contro tutti, then he returned to work at Derby where he was discovered by TV showman, film director and talent scout Renzo Arbore, who cast him as "Don Gabriele" in his 1980 controversial film Il Pap'occhio.

His first successful recurrent role, co-written with Giorgio Porcaro, was that of a poorly cultivated immigrant from southern Italy in Milan ("Terrunciello"), who used to speak a very personal form of slang. The first real starring role is obtained at the insistence of prize-winner actress Monica Vitti, who wanted him in Il tango della gelosia. The success he obtained with this role convinced Carlo Vanzina to produce Eccezzziunale... veramente, for which Abatantuono had written the screenplay. In this film, he plays three different roles as a fan of Italy's three main football teams: A.C. Milan, Internazionale, and Juventus. His performance became iconic and the film turned out to be a cult film in Italy. Twenty years after, he reprised all three roles for the 2006 sequel Eccezzziunale...veramente - Capitolo secondo... me, which featured cameos from then-current Milan players Paolo Maldini, Massimo Ambrosini, Alessandro Costacurta, Dida, Andriy Shevchenko, and Gennaro Gattuso in the 2005–06 UEFA Champions League.

In the mid-1980s he abandoned the character who had given him success, and for some time he devoted himself to theatrical performances. But it was Pupi Avati who led him into the turning point, having understood his potential as an actor, even a dramatic one. Avati will include him in the diptych Christmas Present (1986). For his performance in this film, Abatantuono won a Nastro d'Argento for Best supporting Actor. The film had a sequel, Christmas Rematch.

In Luigi Comencini's A Boy from Calabria (1987), he plays a poor farmer who wishes his eldest son will graduate from school to get out of his miserable condition, and does not understand the boy's passion for running. After this role, Abatantuono founded his own production company, Colorado Film, thanks to which he reaffirmed himself as one of the most interesting actors of the new Italian cinema, with Giuseppe Bertolucci's I cammelli (1988) and Gabriele Salvatores' film cycle, which consecrated him definitively: Marrakech Express (1989), Turné (1990), the Oscar-winning Mediterraneo (1991), Puerto Escondido (1992), Nirvana (1997), Amnèsia (2002), I'm Not Scared (2003), Happy Family (2010) and Volare (2019).

Abatantuono is also a popular figure of Italian television shows. He is well known to be a long-time A.C. Milan fan.

In 2025, his film Life Goes This Way will open the 20th Rome Film Festival on 15 October 2025.

== Filmography ==
=== Actor ===
- Young, Violent, Dangerous (1976)
- Saxofone (1978)
- Prestami tua moglie (1980)
- Arrivano i gatti (1980)
- In the Pope's Eye (1980)
- Fantozzi contro tutti (1980)
- Prickly Pears (1980)
- Una vacanza bestiale (1981)
- I fichissimi (1981)
- Il tango della gelosia (1981)
- I carabbinieri (1981)
- Viuuulentemente mia (1982)
- An Ideal Adventure (1982)
- Eccezzziunale... veramente (1982)
- Scusa se è poco (1982)
- Grand Hotel Excelsior (1982)
- Attila flagello di Dio (1982)
- Arrivano i miei (1982)
- Il ras del quartiere (1983)
- Tranches de vie (1985)
- Christmas Present (1986)
- A Boy from Calabria (1987)
- The Last Minute (1987)
- The Strangeness of Life (1987)
- Kamikazen: Last Night in Milan (1987)
- The Camels (1988)
- Marrakech Express (1989)
- On Tour (Turnè) (1989)
- Vacanze di Natale '90 (1990)
- Mediterraneo (1991)
- Puerto Escondido (1992)
- Nel continente nero (1992)
- The Storm Is Coming (1992)
- For Love, Only for Love (1993)
- The Bull (1994)
- Viva San Isidro! (1995)
- Camerieri (1995)
- The Barber of Rio (1996)
- Nirvana (1997)
- Bedrooms (1997)
- Children of Hannibal (1998)
- Paparazzi (1998)
- Marriages (1998)
- The Best Man (1998)
- Tifosi (1999)
- Nightwatchman (2000)
- Unfair Competition (2000)
- Our Tropical Island (2000)
- Amnèsia (2001)
- Momo (2001)
- Christmas Rematch (2003)
- I'm Not Scared (2003)
- Really SSSupercool: Chapter Two (2006)
- A Dinner for Them to Meet (2007)
- 2061: An Exceptional Year (2007)
- L'abbuffata (2007)
- I mostri oggi (2009)
- The Friends at the Margherita Cafe (2009)
- Things from Another World (2011)
- Buona giornata (2012)
- Ti stimo fratello (2012)
- The Worst Christmas of My Life (2012)
- Guess Who's Coming for Christmas? (2013)
- People Who Are Well (2014)
- Soap Opera (2014)
- Belli di papà (2015)
- I babysitter (2016)
- Mr. Happiness (2017)
- My Big Gay Italian Wedding (2018)
- Volare (2019)
- La mia banda suona il pop (2020)
- When Mom Is Away... With the Family (2020)
- Il mammone (2022)
- Improvvisamente Natale (2022)
- Improvvisamente a Natale mi sposo (2023)
- Life Goes This Way (2025)
- Make a Wish (2025)
- Il malloppo (2026)
- Un tranquillo funerale di famiglia (2026)

=== Screenwriter ===
- Eccezzziunale... veramente (1982)
- Il ras del quartiere (1983)
- Puerto escondido (1992)
- In barca a vela contromano (1997)
- Figli di Annibale (1998)

== Awards ==
David di Donatello

- 1987 Nomination for David di Donatello for Best Supporting Actor for Christmas Present
- 1991 Nomination for David di Donatello for Best Actor for Mediterraneo
- 1994 Nomination for David di Donatello for Best Actor for For Love, Only for Love
- 1997 Nomination for David di Donatello for Best Supporting Actor for Nirvana
- 2004 Nomination for David di Donatello for Best Supporting Actor for I'm Not Scared
- 2021 David Special Award

Nastro d'argento

- 1987 Nastro d'Argento for Best Supporting Actor for Christmas Present
- 1991 Nomination for Nastro d'Argento for Best Actor for Turné
- 1992 Nomination for Nastro d'Argento for Best Actor for Mediterraneo
- 1993 Nastro d'Argento for Best Actor for Puerto Escondido
- 2001 Nomination for Nastro d'Argento for Best Actor for Unfair Competition
- 2004 Nastro d'Argento for Best Supporting Actor for I'm Not Scared
- 2007 Nomination for Nastro d'Argento for Best Actor for A Dinner for Them to Meet

Globo d'oro

- 2001 Nomination for Italian Golden Globe for Best Actor for Unfair Competition

Ciak d'oro

- 1991 Ciak d'oro for Best Actor for Mediterraneo
- 2003 Ciak d'oro for Best Supporting Actor for I'm Not Scared
