= Silvio Muccino =

Italian actor, film director and screenwriter

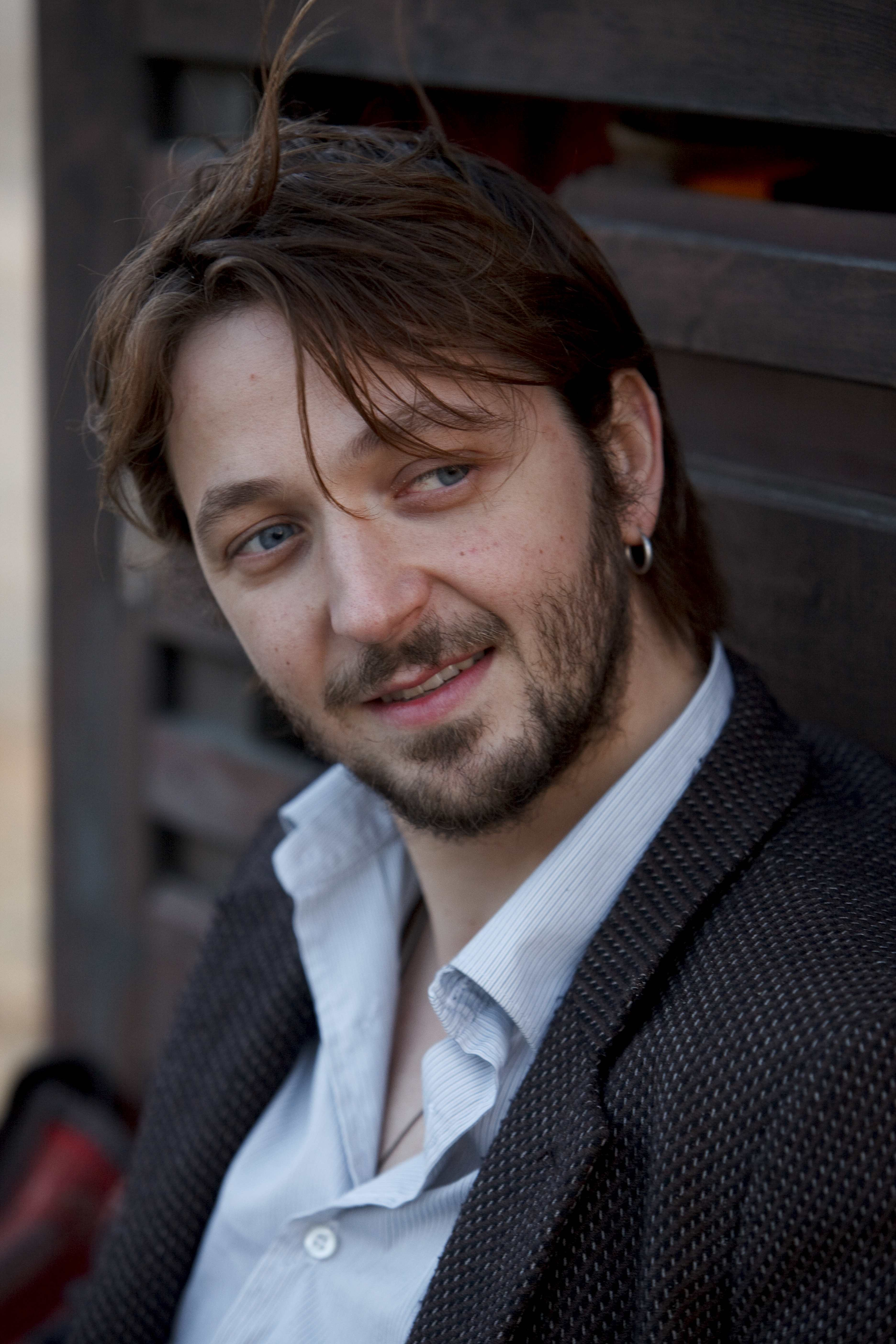
Silvio Muccino in 2010

Silvio Muccino (Italian pronunciation: [ˈsilvjo mutˈtʃiːno]; born 14 April 1982) is an Italian actor, film director and screenwriter.

== Biography ==
Muccino was born in Rome, on 14 April 1982. After graduating from a Roman High School dedicated to the arts, he enrolled in the School of the Arts of Rome's La Sapienza University.

He started his career in Italian cinema, usually playing lead roles in movies directed by his older brother Gabriele. His first appearance was in the film But Forever in My Mind (1999), where Muccino played the lead role of a student participating in a school occupation protesting student homologation. Muccino then went on to star in the movies Remember Me, My Love (2003) and Che ne sarà di noi (2004).

After his early beginnings alongside his brother, Muccino then worked solo in other Italian movies such as The Card Player (2004, directed by Dario Argento), Manuale d'amore (2005), and Il mio miglior nemico (2005).

In 2008 he made his debut as a director with the movie Parlami d'amore.

== Filmography ==
- But Forever in My Mind (Come te nessuno mai), (1999)
- CQ (2001)
- Il 2 novembre (2002)
- Remember Me, My Love, (Ricordati di me) (2003)
- The Card Player (2003)
- Che ne sarà di noi (2003)
- Manuale d'amore (2005)
- Il mio miglior nemico (2006)
- Parlami d'Amore (2008)
- Un altro mondo (2010)
- The Place (2017)
- Security (2021)
