= Gabriele Salvatores =

Italian film director and screenwriter

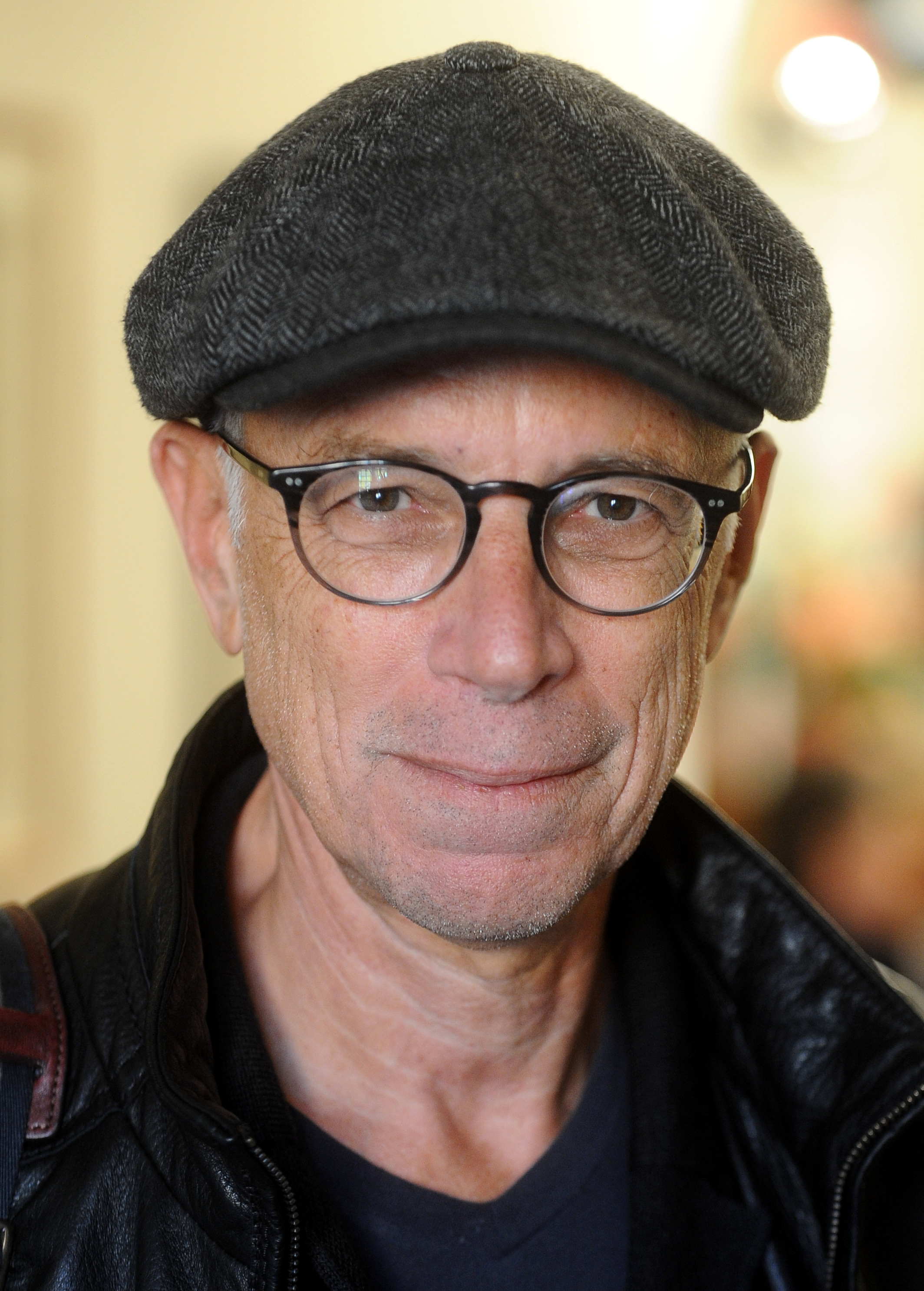
- Gabriele Salvatores at Lucca Comics & Games 2014
- Born: 30 July 1950 (age 75); Naples, Italy
- Occupations: Film director; screenwriter; film producer
- Awards: Academy Award in 1991 for Mediterraneo

Gabriele Salvatores (born 30 July 1950) is an Italian Academy Award-winning film director and screenwriter.

== Biography ==
Born in Naples, Salvatores debuted as a theatre director in 1972, founding in Milan the Teatro dell'Elfo, for which he directed several avant-garde pieces until 1989.

In that year, he directed his third feature film, Marrakech Express, which was followed in 1990 by Turné. Both films shared a group of actor-friends, including Diego Abatantuono and Fabrizio Bentivoglio, who will be present in many of his later movies. Turné was screened in the Un Certain Regard section at the 1990 Cannes Film Festival.

In 1991, Salvatores received international praise for Mediterraneo, which won an Academy Award as best foreign film. It also won three David di Donatello, the most important award for Italian cinema, and a Nastro d'Argento.

In 1992, he released Puerto Escondido, from the eponymous novel by Pino Cacucci, in which Abatantuono and Bentivoglio were joined by another standard actor for Salvatores, Claudio Bisio. The following year, he directed Sud, featuring Silvio Orlando, an attempt to denounce the political and social situation of the Mezzogiorno of Italy seen from the point of view of the unemployed and those at the margins of society.

The main themes of Salvatores' screenplays are escape from a reality that cannot be accepted or understood, nostalgia for friends, and voyages that never end. A new experimental period, however, started in 1997 with Nirvana, a science fiction/cyberpunk attempt which received mixed reviews. This was followed by the surreal Denti (Teeth, 2000), and Amnèsia (2002). Both featured Sergio Rubini.

In 2003, he directed the financially successful I'm Not Scared, based on the Niccolò Ammaniti novel of the same name. In 2005 he directed the noir Quo Vadis, Baby?. His 2008 film As God Commands was entered into the 31st Moscow International Film Festival.

Since 2011, Salvatores has been the artistic director of the Milan Film Festival.

== Filmography ==
- Dream of a Summer Night (1983)
- Kamikazen: Last Night in Milan (1988)
- Marrakech Express (1989)
- On Tour (Turné, 1990)
- Mediterraneo (1991)
- Puerto Escondido (1992)
- Sud (1993)
- Nirvana (1997)
- Denti (2000)
- Amnèsia (2002)
- I'm Not Scared (Io non ho paura, 2003)
- Quo Vadis, Baby? (2005)
- As God Commands (Come Dio comanda, 2008)
- Happy Family (2010)
- Siberian Education (Educazione siberiana, 2012)
- Italy in a Day (2014)
- The Invisible Boy (Il ragazzo invisibile, 2014)
- The Invisible Boy: Second Generation (2018)
- Comedians (2021)
- Casanova's Return (Il ritorno di Casanova, 2023)
- Naples to New York (2024)
