= List of Italian films of 2005 =

A list of films produced in Italy in 2005 (see 2005 in film):

Title	Director	Cast	Genre	Notes
2005
Alla luce del sole	Roberto Faenza	Luca Zingaretti	Drama	
All the Invisible Children	Mehdi Charef, Emir Kusturica, Spike Lee, Kátia Lund, Jordan Scott, Ridley Scott, Stefano Veneruso, John Woo	David Thewlis, Kelly Macdonald, Maria Grazia Cucinotta, Rosie Perez, Hannah Hodson, Jiang Wenli	Drama	anthology film. Italian-French co-production
Amatemi	Renato De Maria	Isabella Ferrari, Pierfrancesco Favino, Donatella Finocchiaro	Drama	
The Beast in the Heart (La bestia nel cuore)	Cristina Comencini	Giovanna Mezzogiorno, Alessio Boni, Stefania Rocca, Angela Finocchiaro, Giuseppe Battiston, Luigi Lo Cascio	Drama	Academy Award nominee. Venice Film Festival best actress (Mezzogiorno)
But When Do the Girls Get Here?	Pupi Avati	Claudio Santamaria, Vittoria Puccini, Paolo Briguglia, Johnny Dorelli	comedy-drama	
Cuore Sacro	Ferzan Özpetek	Barbora Bobuľová, Erika Blanc, Lisa Gastoni	Drama	2 David di Donatello
Do You Like Hitchcock?	Dario Argento	Elio Germano, Elisabetta Rocchetti	Giallo	TV-movie
The Fever	Alessandro D'Alatri	Fabio Volo, Valeria Solarino	comedy-drama	
Floor 17	Manetti Bros.	Giampaolo Morelli, Elisabetta Rocchetti	thriller	
Forever Blues	Franco Nero	Franco Nero	Drama	
La guerra di Mario	Antonio Capuano	Valeria Golino, Andrea Renzi, Anita Caprioli	Drama	David di Donatello best actress (Golino)
Imperium: Saint Peter	Giulio Base	Omar Sharif, Johannes Brandrup, Lina Sastri	Drama	
Karol: A Man Who Became Pope	Giacomo Battiato	Piotr Adamczyk, Małgosia Bela, Raoul Bova	Biographical	TV miniseries
Longtake	Louis Nero	Daniele Savoca	Drama	
Manuale d'amore	Giovanni Veronesi	Silvio Muccino, Carlo Verdone, Sergio Rubini, Margherita Buy, Jasmine Trinca, Luciana Littizzetto	Comedy	Fil with 4 episodes. Huge success. 2 sequel films. 2 David di Donatello. 2 Nastro d'Argento
Melissa P.	Luca Guadagnino	María Valverde, Geraldine Chaplin	erotic drama	
A Neapolitan Spell	Paolo Genovese, Luca Miniero	Marina Confalone	comedy	
Never Again as Before	Giacomo Campiotti	Laura Chiatti	coming of age	
Once You're Born You Can No Longer Hide (Quando sei nato non puoi più nasconderti)	Marco Tullio Giordana	Alessio Boni, Michela Cescon	Drama	Entered into the 2005 Cannes Film Festival
Onde	Francesco Fei	Anita Caprioli, Ignazio Oliva, Filippo Timi	romance	
Quo Vadis, Baby?	Gabriele Salvatores	Angela Baraldi, Gigio Alberti, Elio Germano	Drama	
Raul: Straight to Kill	Andrea Bolognini	Stefano Dionisi, Violante Placido, Giancarlo Giannini	Crime-drama	
Red Like the Sky	Cristiano Bortone	Paolo Sassanelli	drama	
Romanzo Criminale	Michele Placido	Kim Rossi Stuart, Anna Mouglalis, Pierfrancesco Favino, Claudio Santamaria, Stefano Accorsi	Crime-drama	8 David di Donatello. Nastro d'Argento
Saimir	Francesco Munzi	Mishel Manoku	Drama	
La seconda notte di nozze	Pupi Avati	Katia Ricciarelli, Antonio Albanese, Neri Marcorè, Angela Luce, Marisa Merlini	Comedy	2 Nastro d'Argento
Sorry, You Can't Get Through!	Paolo Genovese, Luca Miniero	Carlo Delle Piane, Pierfrancesco Favino, Valerio Mastandrea, Anna Falchi	Comedy	
Texas	Fausto Paravidino	Valeria Golino, Riccardo Scamarcio	drama	
Three Days of Anarchy	Vito Zagarrio	Enrico Lo Verso, Tiziana Lodato	drama	
The Tiger and the Snow (La tigre e la neve)	Roberto Benigni	Roberto Benigni, Nicoletta Braschi, Jean Reno, Emilia Fox, Tom Waits	Comedy-drama	
Il vento fa il suo giro	Giorgio Diritti	Thierry Toscan	drama	
Viva Zapatero!	Sabina Guzzanti	Sabina Guzzanti	documentary	
