= Jean-Michel Arnold =

French activist

Jean-Michel Arnold, (April 5, 1938 – September 4, 2019) was General Secretary of the Cinémathèque Française, Vice President of UNESCO's IFTC (International Council for Film Television and Audiovisual Communication), founder of the Cinéma du Réel, Director of CNRS Image/Media, General Secretary of RIAVS, and President of CAMERA.

== Early life ==
Arnold was the only child of Christine Brisset, an activist known as the “Pasionaria of the Poor”. His father died around the time of his birth. At the age of 15, he left his hometown of Angers and headed for Paris.

There he was befriended by Henri Langlois, founder of the Cinémathèque Française, who became his mentor and spiritual father. At the instigation of Langlois, he went to the newly independent Algeria and helped found the Cinémathèque Nationale Algérienne, first with Ahmed Hocine and later with Boudjemaa Kareche. There he helped organise the “Rencontres des Cinémas du Monde” at the first Panafrican Cultural Festival in 1969 (the second was 40 years later in August 2009).

== Career ==
=== CNRS Image/Média ===
In 1974 the CNRS (the French National Scientific Research Council) appointed him director of a newly formed audiovisual division “CNRSAV” (initially called Service d'étude de réalisation et de diffusion de documents audio-visuels or SERDDAV and finally simplified to “CNRS Image/Média”), which he headed until 2001 and for which he was awarded “La Medaille de Cristal” for his creativity and innovation.

Under his direction, the CNRSAV was responsible for the production of hundreds of film productions, TV programs, film expeditions, multimedia packages and seminars dedicated to science and the arts.

He created formal links with La Fémis, The French State Film School whose first President was Jean-Claude Carrière (also President of RIAVS), and with UNESCO's IFTC.

In 1977 together with Jean Rouch he founded the Cinéma du Réel.

=== Rencontres Internationales de l’Audiovisuel Scientifique ===
In 1976, he created the Rencontres Internationales de l’Audiovisuel Scientifique (RIAVS) an annual event lasting several weeks during which scientists, artists, moviemakers, TV producers and the public meet at the Eiffel Tower and UNESCO to celebrate “a débauche of initiatives, projections, discussions and exhibitions”.

As Kōichirō Matsuura, Director General of UNESCO, wrote: “it is a unique initiative supported by UNESCO… which brings together in one place: science, culture, communication and education.”

There are special screenings of rare cinema items, Symposia (see pictures on right) and the official Festival program, some of which are detailed below:

- The International Festival of TV Science Programs

More than 300 TV production companies from 66 countries in five continents submit TV Science programs for several prizes: namely a) the Grand Prix; b) Prix Special du Jury; c) Prix pour l’Imagerie Scientifique; d) Prix Aventures et Decouvertes; e) Prix Science et Societe; f) Prix Sante; g) Prix Jeunesse; h) Prix du Magazine; and i) Mention Speciale du Jury.

The Prix Argos is a prize that is awarded each year to those websites which show originality, unpredictability and the ability to create new affinities across continents

The Prix Jules Verne is awarded each year to a TV company for their policy towards their viewing pubc as expressed by the quality of their TV programs overall.

The Prix l’Affiche du Monde is awarded each year to the best movie produced by a film school (in cooperation with CILECT) and for the best movie by a non-professional (in cooperation with UNICA)

=== CAMERA ===
Arnold was President of CAMERA (Conseil Audiovisuel Mondial pour les Etudes et les Réalisations sur l'Art), an organization known for promoting creativity, education and culture by means of symposia, production and awards.

CAMERA is on the executive committee of UNESCO's IFTC and, in coproduction with the French Ministère des Relations Extérieures, it produced a series of movies on “Les peintres cinéastes”.

CAMERA is most celebrated for “Le Prix CAMERA” which is awarded each year at UNESCO to

- a city
- a foundation
- a film/TV production company
- a publisher
- a museum

that has shown the most outstanding contribution to Culture and Education

As President of CAMERA, he also advised UNESCO with regard to its initiative to select "Creative Cities of Cinema"

=== Cinémathèque Française ===
Arnold has been associated with the Cinémathèque Française ever since his first meeting with Henri Langlois at the age of 15. He was elected General Secretary in 1981 and has been consistently re-elected since then, working closely with past Presidents, Jean Rouch, Jean-Charles Tacchella, and Claude Berri and with the current President Costa-Gavras.

=== UNESCO ===
Arnold was elected President of the International Council for Film Television and Audiovisual Communication (IFTC) at UNESCO in 2000 and is currently its vice President. The IFTC is UNESCO's advisory body on all matters concerned with film, television and new media. It has functioned for over 50 years as an independent NGO in official formal associate relations with UNESCO, based at UNESCO's headquarters in Paris.
