= Pia Velsi =

Italian actress and singer (1924–2025)

- Born: Elpidia Sorbo; 31 March 1924; L'Aquila, Italy
- Died: 4 September 2025 (aged 101); Rome, Italy
- Occupations: Actress; singer
- Years active: 1940s–2012

Elpidia Sorbo (31 March 1924 – 4 September 2025), known professionally as Pia Velsi, was an Italian actress and singer.

== Life and career ==
Born in L'Aquila, she grew up in Naples, where she began her career as a singer, performing live in the 1940s. After moving to Rome, she made her debut at the Ambra Jovinelli Theater, in a variety company. She was then called to replace the Neapolitan actress Rosalia Maggio during a show (in which she had also to dance and act) at the Petruzzelli Theater in Bari, and from here began her career as an actress. At the beginning of the forties, in addition to acting and dancing, she also began an intense singing activity with the nickname of Nuovo Fiore. During this period she recorded numerous 78 rpm records for the Phonotype label.

During her career in the world of cinema she has worked with many well-known directors, such as Nanni Loy and Renato Castellani; among her numerous film appearances, the short but effective characterizations in the films of Luciano De Crescenzo (the lady of the red horse in Così parlò Bellavista and in 32 dicembre) are worthy of mention, as well as the only co-star in Mario Monicelli's Parenti serpenti, in which she plays grandmother Trieste. From the second half of the 1970s, with the role of leading comic actress, she devoted herself to the Neapolitan drama, joining with the Company of Mario and Sal da Vinci and staging numerous musical comedies on the major stages of Italy.

She has also worked on television, acting in fiction such as Don Matteo and The wings of life. For many years she played a nun in a series of commercials for the Uliveto and Rocchetta waters, together with Alessandro Del Piero and Cristina Chiabotto, and also participated in the television series Tutti pazzi per amore. In 2010 she starred in the TV miniseries for RaiUno entitled Il Signore della scuffa, alongside Gigi Proietti, in the role of the widow Nencioni.

Velsi returned to television again on 31 March 2015, as a guest of the program La vita in diretta, during which her situation of precariousness and poverty is highlighted. Events and collections are created on the web and on social networks to support her.

Velsi died on 4 September 2025, at the age of 101.
