= Mario Amura =

Italian photographer and cinematographer (born 1973)

- Born: 18 April 1973 (age 53); Naples, Italy
- Occupations: Cinematographer; photographer
- Years active: 1993–present
- Website: mario-amura.com

Mario Amura (born 1973) is an Italian photographer and cinematographer.

== Life and career ==
Mario Amura was born in 1973 in Naples, Italy. He took cinematography classes at Centro sperimentale di cinematografia in Rome, studying with Giuseppe Rotunno.

He began working as a photographer in 1993. His early photographic work was collected in the 1999 publication Mario Amura – Fotografie 1995–1999. Starting in 2003, he has been credited as a cinematographer on the Luca Guadagnino films Cuoco contadino (2004) and Melissa P. (2005). Other credits include Sorry, You Can't Get Through! (2005), In Memory of Myself (2007), Draquila – L'Italia che trema (2010), and Into Paradiso (2010).

As a director, in 2003, Amura shot Racconto di guerra, a short film set in Sarajevo during the Balkan war. It was awarded the David di Donatello for Best Short Film the same year and the Ciak d'oro for best short film in 2004.

Since 2007, Amura has been working on a photographic live-performance research project titled StopEmotion, from which he later developed the application Phlay.

Since 2010, he has been the creator of the photographic cycle Napoli Explosion, which consists of large-format works capturing the fireworks celebration staged at the foot of Mount Vesuvius on New Year's Eve. In 2023–24, the project was exhibited at the Museo di Capodimonte in Naples. Between 2025 and 2026, Napoli Explosion was presented in Rio de Janeiro, Brazil.

== Solo exhibitions ==
- 2023–2024: Napoli Explosion, Cellaio, Museo di Capodimonte, Naples, curated by Sylvain Bellenger.
- 2025–2026: Napoli Explosion RAP, Real Albergo dei Poveri, Naples, curated by Sylvain Bellenger.
- 2025–2026: Mario Amura: Napoli Explosion. Fogos, Cores, Luzes, Polo Cultural ItaliaNoRio, organised by the Italian Cultural Institute of Rio de Janeiro.

== Publications ==
- Amura, Mario. Mario Amura – Fotografie 1995–1999. Milan: Studio d'Arte Memoli, 1999. (In Italian and English.)
- Napoli Explosion. Vol. 1. (2023) ISBN 979-12-210-4935-0
- Napoli Explosion. Vol. 2. (2025) ISBN 979-12-243-1275-8
- Amura, Mario. Mario Amura: Napoli Explosion. Fogos, Cores, Luzes. Rio de Janeiro: Istituto Italiano di Cultura di Rio de Janeiro, 2026. (In Italian and Portuguese.)

== Awards ==
- 2003: David di Donatello for Best Short Film – Racconto di guerra.
- 2004: Ciak d'oro for best short film – Racconto di guerra.
- 2005: Giuseppe Rotunno Award for best cinematography – Vento di terra.
- 2007: Giuseppe Rotunno Award for best cinematography – In Memory of Myself.
- 2007: Ciak d'oro nomination for best cinematography – In Memory of Myself.

== Selected filmography ==
As cinematographer

- Monna Lisa, short by Matteo Delbò (2000)
- La notte lunga, short by Paolo Sorrentino (2001)
- Generazioni d'amore: Le quattro Americhe di Fernanda Pivano, by Ottavio Rosati (2001)
- Coppia (o le misure dell'amore), short by Paolo Genovese and Luca Miniero (2002)
- L'ultimo rimasto in piedi, short by Ugo Capolupo (2002)
- Ritratto di bambino, short by Gianluca Iodice (2002)
- On est venu me chercher, short by Ilana Navaro (2003)
- E io ti seguo, by Maurizio Fiume (2003)
- Paesaggio a sud, short by Vincenzo Marra (2003)
- Cuoco contadino, by Luca Guadagnino (2004)
- Vento di terra, by Vincenzo Marra (2004)
- Sorry, You Can't Get Through!, by Paolo Genovese and Luca Miniero (2005)
- The Changing of the Guard, short by Serafino Murri (2005)
- Melissa P., by Luca Guadagnino (2005)
- Sabato, domenica e lunedì, by Paolo Sorrentino (TV – 2004)
- Ti lascio perché ti amo troppo, by Francesco Ranieri Martinotti (2006)
- Il vizio dell'amore, by Valia Santella (TV – 1 episode, 2006)
- L'udienza è aperta, by Vincenzo Marra (2006)
- In Memory of Myself, by Saverio Costanzo (2007)
- Solo amore, by Volfango De Biasi (2008)
- La seconda volta non si scorda mai, by Francesco Ranieri Martinotti (2009)
- Feisbum, episodes by Alessandro Capone, Dino Giarrusso, Laura Luchetti, Mauro Mancini, Serafino Murri, Giancarlo Rolandi, and Emanuele Sana (2009)
- Draquila – L'Italia che trema, by Sabina Guzzanti (2010)
- One Life, Maybe Two, by Alessandro Aronadio (2010)
- Napoli 24 (2010)
- Into Paradiso, by Paola Randi (2010)
- La Brigade, by Cécile Allegra (2012)

As film director

- Portrait from a set (2014)
- Racconto di guerra (2003)

== Bibliography ==
- Masi, Stefano (2007). Dizionario mondiale dei direttori della fotografia [World Dictionary of Cinematographers] (in Italian). Recco: Le Mani. pp. 34–35. ISBN 978-88-8012-387-3.
- Iovino, Serenella (2016). Ecocriticism and Italy: Ecology, Resistance, and Liberation. London: Bloomsbury Academic. p. 45. ISBN 978-1-4725-7165-6.
- Schliephake, Christopher (2017). "Book Review: Serenella Iovino. Ecocriticism and Italy: Ecology, Resistance, and Liberation" (PDF). Anglia. 135 (3): 619–624. doi:10.1515/ang-2017-0063.
- Iovino, Serenella (2018). "Creative Writing and Art: Population, Ecology, and the Malthusian Imagination". Ecozon@: European Journal of Literature, Culture and Environment. 9 (1): 129–133. doi:10.37536/ECOZONA.2018.9.1.2434.
- Murri, Serafino (2020). Sign(s) of the Times: Pensiero visuale ed estetiche della soggettività digitale [Sign(s) of the Times: Visual Thinking and the Aesthetics of Digital Subjectivity] (in Italian). Milan: Meltemi. pp. 165–167. ISBN 978-88-5519-194-4.
- Iovino, Serenella (2022). Paesaggio civile: Storie di ambiente, cultura e resistenza [Civic Landscape: Stories of Environment, Culture, and Resistance] (in Italian). Milan: Il Saggiatore. pp. 44–46. ISBN 978-88-428-3119-8.
- Di Marino, Bruno (2023). "Fantasmagorie sotto il vulcano / Phantasmagories under the volcano". Napoli Explosion (in Italian and English). Vol. 1. Vesev Impresa Sociale. pp. 24–28. ISBN 979-12-210-4935-0.
- De Luca, Erri (2025). "Dentro alcuni minuti / Within a Few Minutes". Napoli Explosion (in Italian and English). Vol. 2. Vesev Impresa Sociale. pp. 6–13. ISBN 979-12-243-1275-8.
- Murri, Serafino (2025). "Frammenti di tempo. Sulle tracce di Napoli Explosion / Fragments of Time. Tracing Napoli Explosion". Napoli Explosion (in Italian and English). Vol. 2. Vesev Impresa Sociale. pp. 14–15. ISBN 979-12-243-1275-8.
- Settis, Salvatore (2025). Napoli Explosion (in Italian and English). Vol. 2. Vesev Impresa Sociale. pp. 34–37. ISBN 979-12-243-1275-8.
- Bellenger, Sylvain (2025). "L'aurora e la notte della fotografia / The Aurora and the Night of Photography". Napoli Explosion (in Italian and English). Vol. 2. Vesev Impresa Sociale. pp. 39–47. ISBN 979-12-243-1275-8.
- Andrade, Joaquim Marçal (2026). "Un reportage sulla festa del fuoco / Uma reportagem sobre a festa do fogo". Mario Amura: Napoli Explosion. Fogos, Cores, Luzes (in Italian and Portuguese). Rio de Janeiro: Istituto Italiano di Cultura di Rio de Janeiro.
- Murri, Serafino (2026). "L'attimo prima (Cronaca di un istante) / Um segundo antes (Crônica de um instante)". Mario Amura: Napoli Explosion. Fogos, Cores, Luzes (in Italian and Portuguese). Rio de Janeiro: Istituto Italiano di Cultura di Rio de Janeiro.
