= Sergio Solli =

Italian actor and stage director (1944–2023)

- Born: 19 November 1944; Naples, Italy
- Died: 3 February 2023 (aged 78); Naples, Italy

Sergio Solli (19 November 1944 – 3 February 2023) was an Italian actor and stage director.

== Life and career ==
Born in Naples, Solli was originally a hairdresser who acted in small amateur dramatics as a hobby, but his career had a turning point in the 1970s after a successful audition with Eduardo De Filippo; he stayed with his stage for numerous years, also appearing in several De Filippo's television works.

Solli was also a theatre director, and worked on stage with the companies of Carlo Giuffrè, Mariano Rigillo, Roberto De Simone, among others. In cinema he had a busy career as a character actor, both in dramatic and comedic roles, and is best remembered for his roles in Luciano De Crescenzo's films.

Solli died on 3 February 2023, at the age of 78.

== Selected filmography ==
- No Thanks, Coffee Makes Me Nervous (1982)
- A Joke of Destiny (1983)
- Petomaniac (1983)
- Così parlò Bellavista (1984)
- Il mistero di Bellavista (1985)
- Stregati (1986)
- 'O Re (1988)
- 32 dicembre (1988)
- Death of a Neapolitan Mathematician (1992)
- Ciao, Professore! (1992)
- Il Postino: The Postman (1994)
- A spasso nel tempo – L'avventura continua (1997)
- E adesso sesso (2001)
- Pater Familias (2003)
- Salty Air (2006)
- La seconda volta non si scorda mai (2008)
- Come Undone (2009)
- The Wholly Family (2011)
- Kryptonite! (2011)
- Piazza Fontana: The Italian Conspiracy (2011)
- To Rome with Love (2012)
- I Can Quit Whenever I Want (2014)
- I Can Quit Whenever I Want: Ad Honorem (2017)
