= Marina Confalone =

Italian actress

Marina Confalone (born 2 June 1951) is an Italian actress, screenwriter, theatre director, writer, holder of five David di Donatello awards.

Born in Naples, Italy, she has appeared in numerous films including Così parlò Bellavista, The Second Time, Notes of Love, The Vice of Hope for which she won four David di Donatello for Best Supporting Actress, and Incantesimo napoletano, for which she was awarded with a David di Donatello for Best Actress.

== Selected filmography ==
- The Sensuous Nurse by Nello Rossati (1975)
- Febbre da cavallo by Steno (1976)
- City of Women (La città delle donne) by Federico Fellini (1980)
- Fontamara by Carlo Lizzani (1980)
- Il marchese del Grillo by Mario Monicelli (1981)
- Grog by Francesco Laudadio (1982)
- Pappa e ciccia by Neri Parenti (1982)
- Flirt by Roberto Russo (1983)
- Effetti personali by Giuseppe Bertolucci and Loris Mazzetti (1983)
- Così parlò Bellavista by Luciano De Crescenzo (1984)
- Don Chisciotte by Maurizio Scaparro (1984)
- Il mistero di Bellavista by Luciano De Crescenzo (1985)
- Sogni e bisogni, serie televisiva, regia by Sergio Citti (1985)
- Separati in casa by Riccardo Pazzaglia (1986)
- Sembra morto... ma è solo svenuto by Felice Farina (1987)
- Gentili signore by Adriana Monti (1987)
- L'uomo, la bestia e la virtù by Carlo Cecchi (1991) comedy by Luigi Pirandello
- Parenti serpenti by Mario Monicelli (1992)
- Ciao, Professore! by Lina Wertmuller (1992)
- Pacco, doppio pacco e contropaccotto by Nanni Loy (1993)
- The Storm Is Coming by Daniele Luchetti (1993)
- Veleno by Bruno Bigoni (1994)
- Croce e delizia by Luciano De Crescenzo (1995)
- The Second Time by Mimmo Calopresti (1995)
- Dio vede e provvede by Enrico Oldoini (1996)
- Notes of Love by Mimmo Calopresti (1998)
- Dirty Linen (Panni sporchi) by Mario Monicelli (1999)
- Lontano in fondo agli occhi by Giuseppe Rocca (2000)
- Una lunga, lunga, lunga notte d'amore by Luciano Emmer (2000)
- A Neapolitan Spell by Luca Miniero (2002)
- Tre donne morali by Marcello Garofalo (2006)
- Amiche da morire by Giorgia Farina (2013)
- The Vice of Hope by Edoardo De Angelis (2019)
