= Roberto Russo =

Roberto Russo may refer to:

- Roberto Russo (musician)
- Roberto Russo (volleyball)
- Roberto Russo (director), director of the 1983 film Flirt
