= Walter Noetico =

Italian painter, sculptor, and writer (born 1946)

Walter Noetico (born 14 July 1946, Vicenza, Italy) is an Italian painter, sculptor, and writer. He is the founder of two art movements: Indimensionalism and Neoilluminism. He is also the inventor of new artistic techniques and of the new Alphabet, Neoilluminist Alphabet, in which every letter has a symbol of a woman and a man.

== Beginnings as a sculptor and painter ==
In 1966, Noetico studied Art and Architecture in Ca' Foscari University of Venice and graduated in 1972. He began his first indimensional paintings in 1968, at first with positive and negative geometric opposition and then with relativistic concepts. In his exhibition at Padova, in 1975, Noetico met the art critic Alexandre Cirici of Barcelona, (President of Art Critics' International Association in Paris in 1978), who became particularly interested in his art.

== Indimensional period and its new style technique ==
Indimensional Art was conceived in 1968, with the first art exhibition in 1975, lasting until 1985. In this technique, a canvas of the painting is contracted inside a transparent perspex sculpture. In Noetico's "Indimensionalist Manifesto", he states: "Indimensionalism is the complete state of the evolutional process of Individual Entity which goes from a prephysical or predimensional state to a physical or dimensional state, finally to reach an extraphysical or indimensional state. Indimensional Art uses these concepts and develops itself in an Einsteinian relativistic way, to give origin to an aesthetic realisation which goes beyond the fourth dimension, to an indimensional state."

Cirici noted that " Noetico has added to the Science and Art of the Cubist Movement, the mathematical philosophy in the representation of the external world. It results from it that Noetico's indimensional art is not only the evolutional continuation of the Cubist effort, but chiefly the evolution of all iconographic representations, first mythical, then religious, of man's history in the search of truth. His paintings from two-dimensional first change into three-dimensional, then into relativistic four-dimensional ones to end at last in the indimensional aspect. " ,

== Neoilluminist (New Enlightenment) period and its style technique ==
Neoilluminist (or New Enlightenment) Art was conceived in the year 1987 and runs to present date (published in the newspaper "La Repubblica" on 23 April 1987). Neoilluminist Art (New Enlightenment Art) was inspired by the Essays on the aesthetic philosophy of Denis Diderot. One of the enunciative propositions of Noetico is that Neoilluminism arises from a need to raise contemporary Mankind out of spiritual, moral, cultural and social decandence.

This Art Movement includes an invention of the new Neoilluminist (or New Enlightenment) Alphabet in which every letter has a symbol of a woman and a man, and the use of unique painting technique which develops in bas-relief (low-relief) and high-relief. Thus figures in the foreground are sculptured in high-relief, those in the background in low-relief, which creates a three-dimensional painting on wood panel painted in enamel and embellished with gold leaf.

== Art activities ==
In Milan in the 1980, Noetico began studying the philosophers of the eighteenth century, in particular the Treaties on the aesthetics by Denis Diderot, who became Noetico's inspiration. In 1987, an exhibition of his works inspired by the Enlightenment, was held in the Gallery of Ada Zunino, with a catalogue by Gillo Dorfles, who concluded his presentation by saying: "The lucidity of Noetico's mind merits to be in the Sacredness of Art".

In April 1988, an exhibition "From the first Alphabet of the Phoenicians at Palazzo Grassi - To the Last Alphabet of W. Noetico at Graziussi Gallery" was held at the Graziussi Gallery, San Marco, Venice, Italy, from 12 to 30 April, where it has been noted that Noetico with his Neoilluminist Alphabet has remade the Alphabet of the Phoenicians to coincide with a major exhibition at Palazzo Grassi.

In October 1988, Noetico founded the art movement called "Neoilluminismo" ("Neoilluminism" or "New Enlightenment"), with the first exhibition along with other Italian Sculptors: Bruno Chersicla, Walter Francone, Nino Maggio, Giovanni Canu and Noetico(known as a Group of 5"), with a catalogue presentation by Raffaele De Grada, at the Art Gallery of Ada Zunino in Milan, which will become the headquarters of Neoilluminismo.

For the celebration of the bicentenary of the French Revolution in June 1989, Noetico was invited by the French Government to participate in the exhibition of his monumental sculptures in bronze "Mental Elevation", "Globe and Civilization", "Seed of Love and Life", in the gardens of Versailles. In 1990, the Neoilluminist group was invited by the City of Cortina dì Ampezzo to exhibit at Cortina Terrace, with catalogue presentation by Raffaele De Grada.

In the same year, Noetico was invited with his Neoilluminist group to the Municipality of Sarnano, where Silvio Ceccato (philosopher and friend of artists such as Lucio Fontana) made the presentation in the catalogue for this event. Walter Noetico received an Arts First Prize from the Municipality of Sarnano city.

Also in 1990, in Salò, Italy (BS) Noetico created the Neoilluminist Foundation with a permanent exhibition of Neoilluminist Artists group. . This Foundation relocate din 1999, to Cortona (AR) and then to Limoges, France in 2008.

In 2005, the International Exhibition of the Greatest Contemporary Artists was organized by Bruno Chersicla, entitled: "The Collector" at the Galliata Art Gallery, Alassio in Italy, with participation of Noetico.

Throughout the 1970s, 1980s and 1990s, Noetico had received the support of major International Art Critics, such as: Gillo Dorfles, Raffaele De Grada (who for a number of years had been the curator of the Venice Biennale, the biggest art event of the world), Silvio Ceccato (who is also a philosopher), and Alexandre Cirici i Pellicer, (President of the AICA (UNESCO) International Art Critics Association in Paris, 1978–1981)

Noetico is an artist, philosopher and intellectualist, who believes that art has an inherent cultural and spiritual value and should not be commercialised. Instead of selling his work to major Art Museums, Noetico has expressed a wish to place his works in the public domain.

== Writing ==
Simultaneously with artistic creations, in 1976 NOETICO published his philosophical novel: Capobranco ("Herd Head") (IPH Publisher Milano).

In 2013, in homage to the third centenary of birth of French Philosopher of the 18th Century, Denis Diderot, he published a book: "Diderot's Dream " ("Il Sogno di Diderot"), Fiacolla Publisher, Ragusa, Italy.

== Selected exhibitions ==
- 1975: The Judgement Art Gallery, The Indimensionalism, Padua, Italy.
- 1976: Robert Miller Gallery, The Indimensionalism, New York (NY, USA).
- 1976: XXXVII Venice Biennale International Art Exhibition, Venice, Italy.
- 1980: Palazzo Trivulzio, Gran Oriente Freemasonry Italy, The Indimensionalism, Milan, Italy.
- 1987: Solo exhibition at the Ada Zunino Gallery, Milan, Italy.
- 1988: Solo exhibition at the 1988 Graziussi Gallery, San Marco, Venice, Italy in 1988, entitled "From the first Alphabet of the Phoenicians at Palazzo Grassi - To the Last Alphabet of W. Noetico at Graziassi Gallery", 12–30 April 1988. Noetico's Sculpture: Letter "W" is in permanent situ in the Pala Graziussi Museum.
- 1988: The Neoilluminism, Gallery Ada Zunino, Milan, Italy.
- 1988: IV International Biennial Sarda, Cagliari, Sardinia, Italy.
- 1989: Public Exhibition at Versailles, France.
- 1990: The Neoilluminism, Cortina Terrace, (Municipality of Cortina Ampezzo) Italy.
- 1990: The Neoilluminists, (Municipality of Sarnano, Macerata) Italy.
- 1990: The Neoilluminist Foundation, Salo, Italy.
- 1991: The Neoilluminist Foundation, Salo, Italy.
- 1992: The Neoilluminism, Contemporary Art Center, New York (USA)
- 1993: The Neoilluminist Foundation, Salo, Lago di Garda, Italy, Noetico's artworks used by a Photographic Service "La Sposa d'Arte" ("Art Bride") of "Chèrie Moda" Milan, Italy, for the famous Fashion Houses as Versace, Valentino, Prada, Armani, "La Sposa" Chèrie Moda, No. 62, January 1993
- 1993–1998: Permanent display at the Neoilluminist Foundation, Salo, Lake Garda, Italy.
- 2005: International exhibition of the major contemporary artists, organized by Bruno Chersicla, entitled: The Collector. Galliata Art Gallery, Alassio, Italy.
- 1999–2008: Permanent exhibition, The Neoilluminista Foundation, Cortona, Arezzo, Tuscany, Italy.
- 2009–2016: Permanent exhibition, The Neoilluminist Foundation, Limoges (F)

== Public monuments ==
- 1968: In Padua, Italy in the central street Via Nazareth, realisation of a sculpture 4m high representing Virgin Mary.
