= Dirty Linen (film) =

1999 film

Dirty Linen (Panni sporchi)
- Film poster
- Directed by: Mario Monicelli
- Written by: Suso Cecchi D'Amico; Mario Monicelli; Masolino D'Amico; Margherita D'Amico
- Produced by: Giovanni Di Clemente
- Starring: Paolo Bonacelli; Marina Confalone; Alessandro Haber; Benedetta Mazzini; Mariangela Melato; Gianni Morandi; Ornella Muti; Michele Placido; Gigi Proietti; Pia Velsi
- Cinematography: Stefano Coletta
- Music by: Luis Enriquez Bacalov
- Distributed by: Compagnia Distribuzione Internazionale; Buena Vista International
- Release date: 29 January 1999
- Running time: 110 minutes
- Country: Italy
- Language: Italian

Dirty Linen (Italian: Panni sporchi) is a 1999 Italian comedy film directed by Mario Monicelli. It was entered into the 21st Moscow International Film Festival.

== Plot ==
An extended family in Marche lives largely on the wealth generated by an old fashioned candy factory. The old owner has got senile, and his relatives compete for the money and power, each from their own problematic situation. This eventually destroys everything.

== Cast ==
- Paolo Bonacelli as Amedeo
- Marina Confalone as Lina
- Alessandro Haber as Genesio
- Benedetta Mazzini as Giada
- Mariangela Melato as Cinzia
- Ornella Muti as Bruna
- Michele Placido as Furio Cimin
- Gigi Proietti as Prof. Rodolfo Melchiorri
- Pia Velsi as Isolina
- Gianfranco Barra as Don Paolo
- Roberto Della Casa as Rubattini
- Francesco Guzzo as Camillo
- Gianfelice Imparato as Lawyer Pierattoni
- Cristiana Liguori as Miss Pierattoni
- Mimma Lovoi as Fosca
- Paolo Lombardi as Dr. Collodi
- Maria Gangale as Miss Collodi
- Alessandro Nuccio as Carlino
- Angelo Orlando as Ginko
- Kassandra Voyagis as Fiore
- Gianni Morandi as himself
