= Pierpaolo Saporito =

Italian architect and urban planner

- Born: April 19, 1944 (age 81); Novara
- Citizenship: Italian
- Organization(s): OCCAM, Observatory on Digital Communication

Pierpaolo Saporito (born April 19, 1944, in Novara) is an Italian architect and urban planner.

He is president of OCCAM, the Observatory on Digital Communication, and as president a.i. of the International Council for Film and Television (CICT/CFT), an official partner of UNESCO.

== Biography ==
=== The beginnings ===
Pierpaolo Saporito was born in Novara in 1944, where he attended classical high school. After gaining experience at Corby and Runcorn New Town in London and at the London Council for Traffic, collaborating on the design of the Westminster Plan at Alvar Aalto's studio, he graduated in architecture from the Milan Polytechnic in 1968.

Immediately after graduating, in 1969, he launched the magazine IN Argomenti e Immagini di Design (Topics and Images of Design) together with a group of artists and architects. Over the course of ten years, the magazine expanded its reach to include five international editions (Italy, US, Latin America, France, and Germany).

=== The 1970s ===
The magazine was most active in the 1970s. The editorial staff included Pierpaolo Saporito as editor-in-chief, Ugo La Pietra as managing editor, and Gilda Bojardi. Other notable figures contributed to various editions: Vincenzo Agnetti, Raymund Abraham, Archizoom Associati, Archigam, Franco Basaglia, Brian Brook, Maurizio Calvesi, Silvio Ceccato, Germano Celant, Gillo Dorfles, Jacques Famery, Gilberto Finzi, Heinz Frank, Hans Hollein, Giancarlo Iliprandi, Achille Bonito Oliva, Max Peinter, Gian Luigi Pieruzzi, Franco Quadri, Pierre Restany, Angelo Sordi, Ettore Sottsass, Superstudio, George J. Sowden, and Tommaso Trini.

The publications featured contributions from leading international figures, and represent a turning point in the following areas:

- Design, contributing to the emergence of post-modernism;
- Fashion, linking fashion to avant-garde artistic and cultural expression;
- Urban planning, raising the issue of demolishing the traditional concept of the "city" to open up to the concept of "instant cities";
- Culture, orienting emerging trends towards practices of collective creativity;
- Social, seeking alternative communities, precursors of new social assets;
- Communication, promoting avant-garde experiences with new digital media (e.g., Sony Portapak), replacing the traditional one-way nature of radio and television with interactivity between subjects.

In addition to its main activities, the magazine sponsors various events. Among these, in 1972, IN sponsored the exhibition "Italy: the new domestic landscape" at the Museum of Modern Art in New York, curated by Emilio Ambasz.

In the same year Pierpaolo Saporito was one of the judges for the International Dupont Contest, an initiative of the Italian Association Dupont de Nemours to "promote, develop, and propose new ideas for the comfort of the modern home". Also in the same year, he was called upon and hired by the Milan Triennale to promote the participation of leading industries in the international section of the XV Triennale, collaborating with curator Ettore Sottsass and promoting the production of around 250 videos by world-renowned architects and artists.

In November 1973 Pierpaolo Saporito founded Environmedia, a movement for environmental communication, based in Milan at the Cassina Showroom, in Via Durini 18.

In 1974 the headquarters in Via Durini hosted the permanent cultural service for the city of Milan, creating documents, broadcasting films, and digital animations. Throughout the year, Environmedia hosted high-level screenings and international collaborations (Institut de l'Environment, Architectural Association School of Architecture, etc.). Among its most important initiatives were: Take Part by Jim Burns, World Man World Environment by Bucky Fuller, Avvolgimento, a concert by Franco Battiato and Demetrio Stratos, and a reportage on the ReNudo festival with commentary by Dario Fo and others.

In 1977 he curated events at the Venice Biennale on dissident art in communist countries and "A Thousand Words for a Thousand Images" at the Royal Academy of Arts in London. In 1978, he began a long collaboration with UNESCO at the International Council for Film and Television (CICT/ICFT) and organized exhibitions at the Centre Pompidou in Paris with Le Temps du Gares, promoting the revitalization of major railway stations worldwide.

=== The 1980s ===
In 1981 on behalf of the Ministero dei Trasporti, he directed the renewal program of Stazione Centrale di Milano (1982–1993), including the shopping center, restaurants, adjacent squares, passenger areas.

From 1981 to 1984 he organized the Carnevale Ambrosiano, widely covered by the media. In 1984, he worked on the exhibitions Experimenta (Todi, Umbria) and Nuraghi – L’uomo e la Pietra nella Sardegna preistorica.

=== The 1990s ===
In 1993 he was elected President of the MCM – Mediterranean Film Festival Council, promoting festivals and cultural and peace initiatives in Europe and the Middle East. In 1994, he co-founded COPEAM, Conferenza Permanente degli Operatori Audiovisivi nel Mediterraneo, an association of 40 Euro-Mediterranean broadcasters. Since 1981, he is associated with the Conseil International du Cinéma et de la Télévision et de la Communication Audiovisuelle (CICT/ICFT), official partner of UNESCO.

In 1996 he founded OCCAM, Observatory for Cultural and Audiovisual Communication in the Mediterranean and the World, to integrate ICT and achieve the SDGs (formerly MDGs), later associating it with the UN Department of Public Information (UNDPI).

=== The 2000s ===
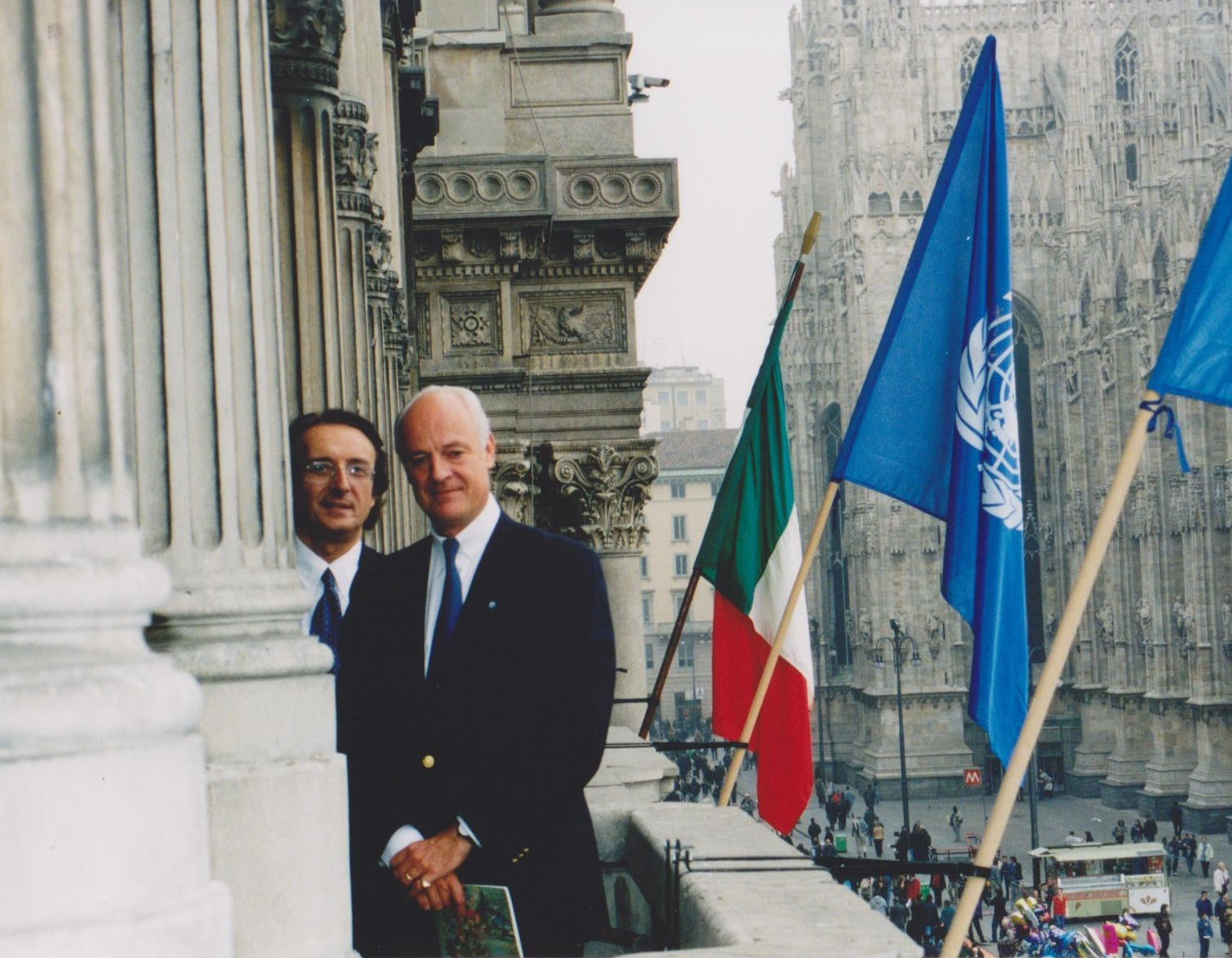
Pierpaolo Saporito, together with Staffan de Mistura, at the OCCAM's first headquarters in Piazza Duomo in Milan, on the occasion of United Nations Day.

In 2005 OCCAM was granted Special Consultative Status with ECOSOC. Since 2006, he has led the Community of Expertise e-service for development within UN GAID, promoting ICT for development in LDCs. Since 2001, the Infopoverty World Conference has gathered international representatives each year at the UN Headquarters in New York City to identify digital solutions against poverty. In parallel, the Infopoverty Program was established, including the ICT Village Project, tested in Borj Touil (Tunisia) and Sambaina (Madagascar), proclaimed a UN Millennium Village in 2007.

In the following years he continued coordinating conferences and projects, serving as vice-president of CICT/ICFT and leading the Euromediterranean Conference on Cinema in Venice and other cities.

=== The 2010s ===
He continued promoting OCCAM initiatives through exhibitions and seminars, including events in Milan and New York. In 2010, together with Vittorio Giacci, he co-produced the film The Earth, Our Home for the UN pavilion at EXPO Shanghai, with numerous renowned collaborators and music by Ennio Morricone.

In 2014 the eMedMed project was launched to provide healthcare services via telemedicine in Tunisia, Morocco, Libya, and Egypt. In 2015, the World Food & Health Security e-Center was implemented at Milano EXPO, and presented in 2016 at COP22, offering telemedicine, agriculture, and training services.

=== The 2020s ===
In recent years, as president of OCCAM, Pierpaolo Saporito has participated in European calls, especially in the agricultural sector. In 2020, the EWA-BELT project was launched, funded by the European Commission under the Horizon 2020 program. OCCAM is part of a consortium of twenty partners, leading two Work Packages of the project, which aims to develop agricultural information systems in organic, agroforestry, and mixed systems across 38 study areas in six countries of Eastern Africa (Ethiopia, Kenya, Tanzania) and Western Africa (Burkina Faso, Ghana, Sierra Leone).

Since 2023, following recent digital revolutions, he has dedicated the editions of the Infopoverty World Conference to the application of artificial intelligence in e-welfare and technologies for sustainable development. In the 2025 edition, in collaboration with UN-HABITAT, a project was presented aimed at piloting the introduction of e-welfare services in rural communities in Nigeria and Kenya.

At the same time he continues to lead activities as acting president of the Conseil International du Cinéma et de la Télévision (CICT/ICFT), promoting the annual editions of the Euro-Mediterranean Cinema Conferences at the Venice Film Festival.
