= Napoli Explosion =

Photographic project by Mario Amura

Napoli Explosion is a photographic series begun in 2010 by the Italian photographer Mario Amura. It depicts the fireworks set off across Naples and the surrounding area on New Year's Eve, photographed from Monte Faito across the Gulf of Naples. The series centres on Mount Vesuvius, whose eruption in AD 79 buried Pompeii and Herculaneum. Amura interprets the fireworks as a symbolic eruption of light and colour, a collective ritual for warding off the threat of another eruption.

By moving the camera during long exposures, Amura records the fireworks as trails and fields of colour. In many of the photographs, the illuminated landscape frames the dark silhouette of Vesuvius.

== Critical interpretation ==
Art historian Salvatore Settis described the series as a form of collective self-portrait. He argued that the people setting off fireworks across Naples contribute, without intending to, to the composition of the images.

Sylvain Bellenger, the curator of the Capodimonte exhibition, examined the relationship between photography and painting in the series. He compared the textures he saw in the photographs to materials such as fabric and slate and drew a parallel with the emphasis on matter in Art Informel. The photographs have also been discussed in the context of pictorialism and abstract photography.

The writer Erri De Luca describes the New Year’s fireworks as a “parody of catastrophe”.

The photographs have also been discussed in relation to the environmental risks of urban development around Vesuvius and the effects of the fireworks on the city.

== Exhibitions ==
The Museo di Capodimonte presented Mario Amura: Napoli Explosion at the Cellaio in the Real Bosco di Capodimonte, Naples, from December 2023 to April 2024. Bellenger curated the exhibition, which included 37 large-format photographs.

The series was shown at the Polo Cultural ItaliaNoRio in Rio de Janeiro from December 2025 to February 2026. The exhibition, organised by the Italian Cultural Institute in Rio de Janeiro, included 20 photographs and an 18-minute documentary.

Napoli Explosion RAP ran at the Real Albergo dei Poveri in Naples from 15 December 2025 to 19 April 2026. Curated by Bellenger, it featured 33 works and formed part of the programme marking the 2,500th anniversary of the founding of Naples.

== Collections ==
The permanent collection of the Museo e Real Bosco di Capodimonte includes NAPEX 223181 (2022). NAPEX 7303222 (2017) is held in the permanent collection of contemporary art at the Pio Monte della Misericordia.

== Selected publications ==
- Amura, Mario (2018). "Napoli Explosion". Ecozon@: European Journal of Literature, Culture and Environment. 9 (1): 134–138. doi:10.37536/ECOZONA.2018.9.1.2416.
- Amura, Mario (2023). Napoli Explosion. Vol. 1. Vesev Impresa Sociale. ISBN 9791221049350.
- Amura, Mario (2025). Napoli Explosion. Vol. 2. Vesev Impresa Sociale. ISBN 9791224312758.
- Napoli Explosion. Fogos, Cores, Luzes. Istituto Italiano di Cultura Rio de Janeiro. 2026.
