= Riccardo Zinna =

Italian actor and musician (1958–2018)

Riccardo Zinna (18 May 1958 – 20 September 2018) was an Italian actor and musician.

Zinna studied under Augusto Perez at the Accademia di Belle Arti di Napoli and at the Conservatorio "Licinio Refice". He began his acting career, which spanned four decades, in theatre in 1975. Zinna was also a guitarist, trumpeter, and composer.

Zinna died of pancreatic cancer at the age of 60 on 20 September 2018. Zinna's funeral was held at the Santa Maria del Buon Consiglio in Naples.

== Selected filmography ==
- The Yes Man (1991)
- The Great Pumpkin (1993)
- Caro diario (1993)
- With Closed Eyes (1994)
- Nirvana (1997)
- Denti (2000)
- This Is Not Paradise (2000)
- Light of My Eyes (2001)
- A Neapolitan Spell (2002)
- I'm Not Scared (2003)
- Remember Me, My Love (2003)
- On My Skin (2003)
- The Remains of Nothing (2004)
- Really SSSupercool: Chapter Two (2006)
- The Goodbye Kiss (2006)
- Flying Lessons (2007)
- Gomorrah (2008)
- Benvenuti al Sud (2010)
- Siberian Education (2013)
