= Never Again as Before =

- Italian: Mai + come prima
- Directed by: Giacomo Campiotti
- Written by: Giacomo Campiotti; Alexander Adabachian
- Produced by: Giacomo Campiotti
- Starring: Laura Chiatti
- Cinematography: Duccio Cimatti
- Edited by: Joe Walker; Fabio Nunziata
- Music by: Corrado Carosio; Pierangelo Fornaro
- Release date: 2005
- Country: Italy
- Language: Italian

Never Again as Before (Italian: Mai + come prima) is a 2005 Italian coming of age drama film produced, written and directed by Giacomo Campiotti.

The film was nominated for the David of the Youth at the 2006 David di Donatello Awards, while the theme song "Warriors of Light/Sei o non sei dei" was nominated for Silver Ribbon for best song.

== Plot ==
Six schoolmates, after the high school exams, decide to leave together for a holiday in the Dolomites, in what will probably be their last summer together before they probably never see each other again. The group consists of Enrico, the creator of the holiday and the group's glue; Max, a disabled boy suffocated by oppressive parents; Lorenzo, a musician who dreams the fame; Giulia, Lorenzo's girlfriend, reluctant to leave; Martina, the other girl in the group, secretly in love with Lorenzo; Cesare, an extravagant boy with a punk style and rough, but with a gold heart.

The six during the stay in the mountains will learn to know themselves and others better, facing and trying to overcome their fears, binding even more between them. And together they will also overcome the tragedy - the death of Enrico during a climb - which troubles the adventure and loosens the bond around the group, so as to arrive united at the end of that summer, after which nothing will be never again as before.

== Cast ==
- Natalia Piatti as Martina
- Marco Velluti as Lorenzo
- Federico Battilocchio as Cesare, aka Fava
- Nicola Cipolla as Max
- Laura Chiatti as Giulia
- Marco Casu as Enrico
- Francesco Salvi as Enrico's Father
- Lunetta Savino as Cesare's Mother
- Emanuela Grimalda as Martina's Mother
- Pino Quartullo as Lorenzo's Father
- Mariella Valentini as Giulia's Mother
- Lidia Broccolino as Max's Mother
- Marco Gambino as Max's Father
- Fabio Sartor as Giulia's Father

== See also ==
- List of Italian films of 2005
