= This Night Is Still Ours =

- Directed by: Paolo Genovese; Luca Miniero
- Written by: Massimiliano Bruno; Paolo Genovese; Luca Miniero; Fausto Brizzi; Marco Martani; Xiang Yang Li
- Produced by: Fulvio Lucisano; Federica Lucisano
- Starring: Nicolas Vaporidis; Valentina Izumi Cocco; Massimiliano Bruno; Ilaria Spada
- Cinematography: Gianfilippo Corticelli
- Edited by: Nicola Bonifati; Alessandro Lucidi
- Music by: Daniele Silvestri
- Production companies: Italian International Film; The Walt Disney Company Italia
- Distributed by: Buena Vista International
- Release date: 2008
- Running time: 98 minutes
- Language: Italian

This Night Is Still Ours (Italian: Questa notte è ancora nostra) is a 2008 Italian comedy film directed by Paolo Genovese and Luca Miniero.

== Cast ==
- Nicolas Vaporidis as Massimo Cirulli
- Valentina Izumi Cocco as Jing Fu
- Massimiliano Bruno as Andrea
- Ilaria Spada as Maria
- Katie McGovern as cute American girl
- Maurizio Mattioli as Marco Cirulli
- Franco Califano as Franco Cicchillitti
- Paola Tiziana Cruciani as Miss Rita
- Hal Yamanouchi as Laowang

== See also ==
- Movies about immigration to Italy
