= Fabio Sartor =

Italian actor (1954–2024)

- Born: 12 October 1954; Castelfranco Veneto, Italy
- Died: 6 November 2024 (aged 70); Rome, Italy
- Education: Università Iuav di Venezia
- Occupation: Actor
- Spouse: Connie Nielsen (divorced)
- Children: 1

Fabio Sartor (12 October 1954 – 6 November 2024) was an Italian actor.

== Biography ==
Born in Castelfranco Veneto on 12 October 1954, Sartor studied architecture at the Università Iuav di Venezia at the same time as Vittorio Gregotti, Aldo Rossi, and Massimo Cacciari. At the same time, he took acting lessons at the Teatro a l'Avogaria. In the theatre, he worked with directors such as Giorgio Strehler, Peter Stein, Luca Ronconi, Klaus Michael Grüber, and Luca Barbareschi. In cinema, he worked with the likes of Mel Gibson, Diane Kurys, Peter Greenaway, Ruggero Deodato, Giuseppe Piccioni, Enrico Oldoini, Pappi Corsicato, and Florestano Vancini.

Sartor was married to and had a son, Sebastian, with actress Connie Nielsen. Sartor died in Rome on 6 November 2024, at the age of 70.

== Filmography ==
- Aurelia (1986)
- The Belly of an Architect (1987)
- Phantom of Death (1988)
- The Game Bag (1997)
- Nirvana (1997)
- Not of this World (1999)
- Jesus (1999)
- The Luzhin Defence (2000)
- Chimera (2001)
- The Passion of the Christ (2004)
- The Fallen (2004)
- The Birthday (2005)
- Never Again as Before (2005)
- The Candidate (2007)
- The Italian Banker (2021)
