= Parenti serpenti =

- Directed by: Mario Monicelli
- Written by: Piero De Bernardi; Mario Monicelli; Suso Cecchi d'Amico; Carmine Amoroso
- Story by: Carmine Amoroso
- Produced by: Giovanni Di Clemente
- Starring: Tommaso Bianco; Renato Cecchetto; Marina Confalone; Alessandro Haber; Cinzia Leone; Eugenio Masciari; Paolo Panelli; Monica Scattini; Pia Velsi
- Cinematography: Franco Di Giacomo
- Edited by: Ruggero Mastroianni
- Music by: Adelio Cogliati
- Distributed by: Clemi Film
- Release date: 26 March 1992
- Running time: 105 minutes
- Country: Italy
- Language: Italian

Parenti serpenti (Italian for 'Relatives [Are] Snakes'), also released in English as Dearest Relatives or Poisonous Relations, is a 1992 Italian black comedy film written and directed by Mario Monicelli. It won the Italian film critics Silver Ribbon for Best Costumes. Writer Carmine Amoroso, who conceived of the story for the film, later adapted the film into a stage play that ran in Italy and Spain.

== Plot ==
Trieste and Saverio, an old couple, invite their four children, two sons-in-law, a daughter-in-law, and two grandchildren to their home in Sulmona, Abruzzo, Italy, to celebrate Christmas. After a day spent eating and playing bingo, Trieste asks her children to decide amongst themselves which of them will take her and her husband to live with them, now that they are getting old. The children are initially pleased to hear that their parents want to see more of them, but no one wants to take on the responsibility of having them move into their home.

== Cast ==
- Pia Velsi as grandmother Trieste
- Paolo Panelli as grandfather Saverio
- Marina Confalone as Lina
- Alessandro Haber as Alfredo
- Monica Scattini as Milena
- Eugenio Masciari as Alessandro
- Cinzia Leone as Gina, Alessandro's wife
- Tommaso Bianco as Michele, Lina's husband
- Renato Cecchetto as Filippo, Milena's husband
- Riccardo Scontrini as Mauro, Lina's son
- Eleonora Alberti as Monica, Alessandro's daughter
- Mike Bongiorno as himself
- Nicoletta Orsomando as herself

== See also ==
- List of Italian films of 1992
