= A Neapolitan Spell =

- Directed by: Paolo Genovese; Luca Miniero
- Written by: Paolo Genovese; Luca Miniero
- Produced by: Paolo Occhipinti; Gianluca Arcopinto
- Starring: Marina Confalone
- Cinematography: Andrea Locatelli
- Music by: Enzo Avitabile
- Release date: 2002
- Running time: 98 min
- Country: Italy
- Language: Italian

A Neapolitan Spell (Italian: Incantesimo napoletano) is a 2002 Italian comedy film written and directed by Paolo Genovese and Luca Miniero, at their feature film debut.

For her performance in this film, Marina Confalone won the David di Donatello for Best Actress.

== Plot ==
Little Assunta, born into a Neapolitan family, begins to speak with a strict Milanese dialect as she grows up. This strange anomaly leaves her relatives in despair. Over the years, despite attempts to correct her speech, Assunta's language skills will deteriorate further, to the point where she will be given the nickname "Cotoletta." She will also refuse to adopt Neapolitan traditions and prefer Lombard sweets over those typical of her city.

All further attempts by family and friends will be in vain, as will the long stay that they will make her do in Torre Annunziata to let her study the true Neapolitan language with her uncles, commoners who speak only in a very narrow dialect.

When she reaches twenty, Assuntina becomes pregnant.

== Cast ==
- Gianni Ferreri as Gianni Aiello
- Marina Confalone as Patrizia Aiello
- Clelia Bernacchi as Assunta (old age)
- Serena Improta as Assunta (20 years old)
- Chiara Papa as Assunta (10 years old)
- Riccardo Zinna as Riccardo
- Lello Giulivo as Ciro
- Lucianna De Falco as Renata
- Ciro Ruoppo as Don Alfonso

== See also ==
- List of Italian films of 2005
