= Il mistero di Bellavista =

- Directed by: Luciano De Crescenzo
- Written by: Luciano De Crescenzo; Riccardo Pazzaglia
- Story by: Luciano De Crescenzo
- Starring: Luciano De Crescenzo; Marina Confalone
- Cinematography: Sebastiano Celeste
- Edited by: Anna Napoli
- Music by: Renzo Arbore; Claudio Mattone
- Production company: Eidoscope International
- Distributed by: Columbia Pictures
- Release date: 1985
- Language: Italian

Il mistero di Bellavista (also known as Bellavista's Mystery and The Mystery of Bellavista) is a 1985 Italian comedy film written, directed and starring Luciano De Crescenzo.

In the film, an attempt to observe Halley's Comet with a telescope allows two people to witness a murder. They realize that a woman is missing, and they start privately investigating the crime. But they accidentally uncover other crimes, such as the trade of art forgeries, and the smuggling of furs.

== Plot ==
From the terrace of his building Professor Bellavista is observing Halley's Comet. The goalkeeper Salvatore and his friend Saverio, instead of framing the comet, mistakenly point the telescope lens towards the window of an apartment in the opposite building, believing they are witnessing the murder of Mrs. Jolanda, a second-hand clothing dealer. Once on the spot, the mistress of the suspect apartment, a fur trafficker, is actually missing, leaving the ragù on the fire, even if the body is not found.

The group, together with other acquaintances, begins to privately investigate the crime, stumbling upon rather original subjects including a couple of elderly sisters who, to avoid eviction, pretend to have a crazy nephew at home, a decayed noble art expert who with the complicity of his wife he organizes dramas in order to sell fake paintings of value, until he runs into the Italian-American furrier Frank Amodio, a shady trafficker and lover of the missing lady.

Thanks to him, Bellavista's son-in-law, who emigrated to Northern Italy, finds his first buyer for a nuclear shelter, and it turns out that the missing lady had actually left suddenly.

== Cast ==
- Luciano De Crescenzo as Professor Gennaro Bellavista
- Sergio Solli as Saverio
- Benedetto Casillo as Salvatore
- Marina Confalone as Rachelina
- Renato Scarpa as Dr. Cazzaniga
- Andy Luotto as Frank Amodio
- Marisa Laurito as Marquise Marisa Buonajuto di Pontecagnano
- Riccardo Pazzaglia as Marquis Filiberto Buonajuto di Pontecagnano
- Nuccia Fumo as Mrs. Carmelina Finizio
- Nunzia Fumo as Mrs. Camilla Finizio
- Gerardo Scala as Luigino
- Renato Rutigliano as Capuozzo
- Lucio Allocca as Mercalli
- Geppy Gleijeses as Giorgio
- Luigi Uzzo as Armando
- Max Turilli as Frank Footter

== See also ==
- List of Italian films of 1985
