= Bruno Chersicla =

Italian painter and sculptor (1937–2013)

- Born: Chersicla; 10 October 1937; Trieste, Italy
- Died: 3 May 2013 (aged 75); Trieste, Italy
- Education: State Arts Institute
- Known for: Painting, sculpture
- Movement: Contemporary

Bruno Chersicla (Italian pronunciation: [ˈbruːno kerˈsiːkla]) (10 October 1937 – 3 May 2013) was an Italian painter and sculptor.

== Biography ==
Bruno Chersicla studied at the Istituto Statale d'Arte per l'Arredamento e la Decorazione della Nave e degli Interni (a State arts institute) in Trieste. He realized his first informal works in 1958. In the 1950s he also realizes works on the liner ships SS Aurelia, SS Galileo Galilei, SS Raffaello, SS Eugenio C and SS Oceanic.

In the 1960s, he was among the founders of the Triestan group Raccordosei, and he realised the sets and costumes for the Teatro Stabile di Prosa in Trieste and for the Piccolo Teatro in Milan, where he had lived since 1966. The production of informal works was followed from the end of the 1960s by an experimental period in the construction of wooden polychrome structures entitled baroki. In the 1970s the abstract solutions are complemented by a kind of representation of geometrical forms, Lezione di Geometria (lesson of geometry) and later, with the work Spitzenkongress, Chersicla started to realise portraits in particular of personalities of the avant-garde culture who shaped his identity: Klee, Tàpies, Svevo, Joyce, Klimt, Depero.

In 1982, the year of the centenary of Joyce, he created drawings and sculptures in Trieste for È tornato Joyce (Joyce is back). In 1986, he realised some large-scale works that are the symbols of the city of Trieste for the exhibition Trouver Trieste at the Conciergerie and at the Centre Beaubourg in Paris. Shortly before dying, he exhibited again in Paris, in 2010, at Gallerie Barès. From 1992 on, he participated in the completion of the Annunciazione Church in Pregallo di Lesmo (Province of Monza and Brianza) with the sculpture of the Annunciation behind the Altar, the confessional and the stations of the Via Crucis.

In 1990, Bruno Chersicla joined the group of artists called “Group of 5” (Canu, Chersicla, Francone, Maggio, Noetico/Walter Noetico) of the Neoilluminist Art Movement, created by sculptor Walter Noetico. For this occasion, he participated with this Neoilluminist Group in a public exhibition organised by the municipality of Sarnano (Italy); the catalogue of the Exhibition was presented by the Philosopher Silvio Ceccato.

He presented a big anthological exhibition in 1994 in Reggio Emilia and in 1997 in the Museo Rivoltella in Trieste. In 2001, he set a Guinness World Record for the world's largest painting on the Piazza dell'Unità Italiana in Trieste.

Some of his major exhibitions took place in North America, e.g. Atlanta, Chicago, Miami, New York, and Toronto.

== Awards ==
- 2008 Premio delle Arti Premio della Cultura di Milano
- 2009 Premio San Giusto d'Oro a Trieste

== Publications ==
- (in Italian) È tornato Joyce: iconografia triestina per Zois, con una prefazione di Giancarlo Vigorelli e un commentario di Stelio Crise, Nuova Rivista Europea (NRE), Milano, 1982
- Trailers, Ed. Spriano, Omegna, 1985
- Europa a lapis, prefazione di Pier Luigi Gerosa. Ed. Il Capricorno, Bormio, 1986
- Il viaggio, Ed. Spriano, Omegna, 1987
- Veicoli, Ed. Spriano, Omegna, 1987
- Tropos, Metafore pubblicitarie, prefazione di Vincenzo Guarracino. Ed. Spriano, Omegna, 1990
- Teatro fu Canossa, Commentario di Leopoldo Paciscopi. Edizioni La Scaletta, San Polo d’Enza, 1992
- Teodelinda – Una regina per Monza, testi di Renato Mambretti e Paola Scaglione. Ass. Pro Monza, Monza, 1996
- 24h – Indice dei gesti ricorrenti, Ed.Donati galleria libreria, Crevalcore, 1999
- Café, Testo di Vincenzo Guarracino. Ed. Seregn de la Memoria, Seregno, 2000
- Nel parco di Miramare : dodici alberi esotici: ritratti da Bruno Chersicla / portrayed by Bruno Chersicla, Stella, Trieste, N. Bassanese, 2000
- Il Collezionista, Testo di Gian Pietro Menzani. Ed. Galleria Galliata, Alassio, 2005
- Basilica di San Pietro al Monte, Adelchi e il cinghiale, prefazione di Piergiorgio Mandelli. Cattaneo Ed. Oggiono, 2008
- Trieste 24 ipotesi di realtà, prefazione di Rossella Fabiani. GR Edizioni, Besana in Brianza, 2010
