= Serafino Murri =

Italian film critic, screenwriter, and film director (born 1966)

- Born: 5 April 1966 (age 60); Rome, Italy
- Occupations: Film critic; screenwriter; film director

Serafino Murri (born 5 April 1966) is an Italian film critic, screenwriter, and film director from Rome.

== Career ==
Early career

After graduating in aesthetics from Sapienza University of Rome in 1990, Murri began writing screen dialogues for foreign film dubbing into Italian. He also became a dramaturg at the Rome-based theatre company I Costruttori.

In 1996, he started work as a screenwriter with Italian film directors such as Volfango De Biasi and Mario Monicelli, and in the same year, he helped launch the Italian cinema quarterly Close-Up as well as becoming its managing editor, a position he held until 1999. He was also instrumental in the creation of the cinema monthly Filmmaker's Magazine, and was its managing editor from 1998 until 2000.

Film criticism and writing

Murri's main credits as a film critic are studies and books on the work of Pier Paolo Pasolini, Krzysztof Kieslowski, and Martin Scorsese, as well as essays on cinema. He also translated into Italian Orson Welles' book Interviews in 2005.

Murri was a member of the selection committee of the Venice Film Festival in 2002 and 2003, and in 2008 and 2009, he managed the "Factual" section of the Roma Fiction Fest. From 2005 to 2013, he was a film critic of the monthly magazine La Repubblica XL.

From 1999 to 2006, Murri collaborated with the satellite TV network RaiSat Cinema World as author, director, and studio host for television programmes. From 2012, he wrote TV magazines for the DTV channel RaiMovie.

Murri has contributed entries to the Enciclopedia del Cinema and Lessico del XXI secolo, published by Treccani.

Directing

Murri's debut in filmmaking is the 2004 feature-length production Movimenti, written and directed with Claudio Fausti. He followed this with several more projects, including the 2005 short The Changing of the Guard, produced and broadcast by Sky Channel. In 2009, he wrote the segments "Angelo Azzurro Reloaded" and "The Addiction" from the anthology film Feisbum - Il film.

He has also made documentary films, including The Music Hall of Rome in 2008 and Scandalo in sala. La sfida tra Potere e Cinema in Italia in 2014 (co-directed with Alexandra Rosati).

Teaching

Since 1999, Murri has taught cinema, art, and communication subjects ("Visual Communication", "Scriptwriting", "Phenomenology of Contemporary Arts") at Istituto Europeo di Design (IED) in Rome. He also taught "Audiovisual and Media Translation" at IULM University of Milan, and he teaches "New Media and Cinema" at the Cinematographic Art School Gian Maria Volontè in Rome. He has been at the International University of Rome since 2018.

Memberships and posts

- From 2006 to 2009, Murri was on the board of directors of Filmitalia S.p.a., associated with the film studio Cinecittà.
- From 2007 to 2010, he was a member of the Cinema Commission of the Italian Society of Authors and Publishers.
- Since 2014, he has been working with Mario Amura at Emoticron s.r.l., an innovative startup founded in November 2014 in Naples. The organization has developed a web application and mobile app for real-time music and picture editing and sharing, named "StopEmotion".

== Partial bibliography ==
Essays

- Serafino Murri, Pier Paolo Pasolini, Editrice Il Castoro, Milan, 1994. ISBN 978-88-8033-025-7.
- Serafino Murri, Krzysztof Kieslowski, Editrice Il Castoro, Milan, 1996. ISBN 978-88-8033-061-5.
- Serafino Murri, Martin Scorsese, Editrice Il Castoro, Milan, 2000. ISBN 978-88-8033-142-1.
- Serafino Murri, Pier Paolo Pasolini: Salò o le 120 giornate di Sodoma, Lindau, Turin, 2001. ISBN 978-88-7180-350-0.

Literary works

- "Invisibile a me stesso" ("Invisible to Myself", poem), Nuovi Argomenti, no. 20, October–December 2002, Milan, Mondadori. ISBN 978-88-04-50432-0.
- "Navarro Waltz", in La qualità dell'aria. Storie di questo tempo (eds. Nicola Lagioia, Christian Raimo), Rome, Minimum fax, 2004. ISBN 978-88-7521-012-0.
- "Attori" ("Actors", short story), Nuovi Argomenti, no. 31, 2005, Milan, Mondadori. ISBN 978-88-04-54376-3.

== Partial filmography ==
Film

- Movimenti (2004)
- The Changing of the Guard, short film (2005)
- The Music Hall of Rome, documentary (2008)
- Feisbum – Il film, segments: "Angelo Azzurro Reloaded", "The Addiction" (2009)
- Scandalo in sala. La sfida tra Potere e Cinema in Italia, documentary (2014)

Television

- Nascita di un film (Birth of a Movie, documentary series, RaiSat Cinema, 2000)
