= Sorry, You Can't Get Through! =

Sorry, You Can't Get Through! (Nessun messaggio in segreteria)
- Directed by: Paolo Genovese; Luca Miniero
- Written by: Paolo Genovese; Luca Miniero
- Produced by: Anna Falchi
- Starring: Carlo Delle Piane; Pierfrancesco Favino; Valerio Mastandrea; Nicole Murgia; Lorenza Indovina; Anna Falchi
- Cinematography: Mario Amura
- Release date: 2005
- Running time: 98 min
- Country: Italy
- Language: Italian

Sorry, You Can't Get Through! (Italian: Nessun messaggio in segreteria) is a 2005 Italian comedy film written and directed by Paolo Genovese and Luca Miniero.

== Synopsis ==
Walter is a lonely pensioner still full of energy and imagination; convinced by a newspaper article that for every young man who works there is an elderly person who stays at home, Walter decides to go and find this young man, and to help him by hanging around. Helped by little Sara, his only friend and ally, and mocked by a cynical doorkeeper, Walter picks Piero, a tireless but shy worker.

Walter enters Piero's life in an overbearing way, without asking permission; he turns the young man's life upside down but teaches him a new perspective from which to look at himself and the world, as well as techniques to conquer Francesca, Sara's single mother who is disappointed by men, and with whom Piero has fallen in love. Piero first tries to completely change his lifestyle, playing the role of a strong and exuberant man, capable of conquering the woman he loves with a snap of his fingers, but later realizes that this facade causes him suffering rather than joy, even though he has won Francesca's heart. Piero then confesses this to her through a romantic letter.

== Cast ==
- Carlo Delle Piane as Walter
- Pierfrancesco Favino as Piero (shy)
- Valerio Mastandrea as Piero (extrovert)
- Nicole Murgia as Sara
- Lorenza Indovina as Francesca
- Anna Falchi as Sonia
- Gianfranco Funari as Himself

== See also ==
- List of Italian films of 2005
