= The Luzhin Defence =

- Directed by: Marleen Gorris
- Screenplay by: Peter Berry
- Based on: The Defense; 1964 novel by Vladimir Nabokov
- Produced by: Caroline Wood
- Starring: John Turturro; Emily Watson; Geraldine James; Stuart Wilson; Christopher Thompson; Kelly Hunter
- Cinematography: Bernard Lutic
- Music by: Alexandre Desplat; Layla Stanson
- Production companies: France 2 Cinema; Clear Blue Sky Productions
- Distributed by: Entertainment Film Distributors (United Kingdom); UGC Fox Distribution (France)
- Release date: September 8, 2000 (United Kingdom)
- Running time: 109 minutes
- Countries: United Kingdom; France
- Language: English
- Box office: $1,864,747

The Luzhin Defence is a 2000 romantic drama film directed by Marleen Gorris, starring John Turturro and Emily Watson. The film centres on a mentally tormented chess grandmaster and the young woman he meets while competing at a world-class tournament in Italy. The screenplay was based on the novel The Defense (or The Luzhin Defence) by Vladimir Nabokov.

Emily Watson received best actress nominations at the British Independent Film Awards and the London Film Critics Circle Awards.

== Plot ==
It is the early 1920s and Aleksandr Ivanovich 'Sascha' Luzhin (Turturro), a gifted but tormented chess player, arrives in a Northern Italian city to compete in an international chess competition. Prior to the tournament he meets Natalia Katkov (Watson) and he falls in love with her almost immediately. She in turn finds his manner to be appealing and they begin to see each other in spite of her mother's disapproval.

Competing alongside Luzhin in the championship is Dottore Salvatore Turati (Fabio Sartor), who is approached by Leo Valentinov (Stuart Wilson), a Russian, who is Luzhin's former chess tutor from pre-revolutionary Russia. Valentinov tells the Italian that Luzhin cannot handle pressure and he intimates he will make sure that his former prodigy will be unsettled off-table, giving Turati a winning chance.

The competition starts badly for Luzhin, who is unsettled by the presence of his former friend and coach. He struggles through the early rounds but he soon begins to win again as his relationship with Katkov becomes closer and intimate. She then informs her parents that she is going to marry him. Meanwhile, Luzhin goes on to reach the final and face Turati.

But in the finals the Russian Émigré loses out to the time clock, forcing the game to adjourn. However, outside the venue, he is whisked away by an accomplice of Valentinov who abandons him in the countryside. His former teacher knows that this will completely unhinge him because of the memory of his parents' abandonment many years ago. Luzhin wanders aimlessly until he collapses and is found by a group of Blackshirts.

Luzhin is taken to the hospital suffering from complete mental exhaustion. The doctor informs Katkov that he will die if he keeps playing chess as he is addicted to the game and it is consuming his very being. Nevertheless, even while recuperating Valentinov comes around with a chess board encouraging Luzhin to finish the match with the Italian, Turati. Natalia defends her beloved but urges him to break off with the game. Luzhin seems to agree.

Eventually Luzhin leaves the hospital. He and Natalia then agree to marry at the earliest opportunity. However, on the morning of the wedding, Luzhin is put into a car with Valentinov, who tells him that there is the small matter of finishing the competition. In terror, Luzhin leaps from the car. Dazed, cut and mentally confused, he stumbles back to the hotel where he tries to dig up the rest of the glass chess pieces he buried on the grounds years ago, (1:36:39 "I've got the King but I need the whole army...") but he does not find them.

Luzhin, who is in his muddied wedding suit, sits in his room as Natalia and the hotel staff try to open the door. But before they can get in, the troubled chess grandmaster throws himself out of his bedroom window and dies. The tragic death is witnessed by Valentinov who has just arrived by car.

The film then concludes in the competition hall where Natalia completes the competition using her fiancé's notes. She discovers the papers in his pocket and an experienced chess player explains to her the matter of the notes. In an arranged meeting without public she plays against Turati who does exactly what Luzhin expected and loses. Katkov and Turati then leave acknowledging the genius of Luzhin.

== Cast ==
- John Turturro as Luzhin
- Emily Watson as Natalia
- Geraldine James as Vera
- Stuart Wilson as Valentinov
- Christopher Thompson as Stassard
- Fabio Sartor as Turati
- Peter Blythe as Ilya
- Orla Brady as Anna
- Mark Tandy as Luzhin's Father
- Kelly Hunter as Luzhin's Mother

== Production ==
Nabokov based The Defense on the life of German chess master Curt von Bardeleben, who seemingly committed suicide by leaping from a window in 1924.

The film was shot entirely in Europe. Budapest, Hungary was used for outdoor scenes as they were set in St Petersburg, these included the Széchenyi Chain Bridge, Hungarian National Museum and Heroes' Square. The chess tournament (although in Italy) was shot inside the main hall of the Museum of Ethnography, Budapest. In Italy, the hotel scenes were filmed at Villa Erba, Cernobbio, on the Lake Como. The scene at the railway station is in Brenna-Alzate, near Como.

In the novel, Valentinov's first name is never mentioned; on the contrary, Luzhin's first name is revealed only in the closing sentences. Another dissimilarity is that the novel ends up by Luzhin's suicide, thereby his game would be never finished.

== The finale ==
Turati vs. Luzhin

Position: f8 black king, f7 black pawn, h7 black pawn, a6 black pawn, g6 black pawn, c5 black bishop, a4 white pawn, f4 white pawn, b3 white pawn, c3 white knight, e3 black rook, f3 white king, e2 white bishop, g2 white pawn, h2 white pawn, c1 white rook

White to move

The chess position they play for the final between Turati and Luzhin is already a winning position for Black (Luzhin), even though Black is down on material. By playing 1. Kg4 (as opposed to 1. Kf2) White walks into a forced checkmate with a rook sacrifice:

- 1. Kg4 f5+
- 2. Kg5 Kg7 If 2. Kh4 Be7#
- 3. Nd5 Rh3!
- 4. gxh3 h6+
- 5. Kh4 Bf2#

If White plays 1. Kf2 instead of 1. Kg4 this leads to a heavy material loss for White and an easy game for Black:

- 1. Kf2 Rxc3+
- 2. Ke1 Rxc1+

and Black is up by a rook.

In the film Luzhin's final moves were made by his fiancé. The tournament had been paused after Luzhin had a nervous breakdown which had been caused by extreme strain. On the same day he was going to get married he committed suicide by jumping from the hotel balcony. His fiancé later found a piece of paper inside his jacket where he had written down his intended final moves against Turati.

== Cinematic error ==
Luzhin vs. Unknown

Position: e8 white rook, g8 black king, f7 black pawn, g7 black bishop, b6 black pawn, d6 white knight, h6 black pawn, a5 black pawn, g5 black pawn, f4 black queen, a3 white queen, h3 white pawn, a2 white pawn, b2 white pawn, c1 black rook, d1 white rook, h1 white king

Black to move

In Luzhin's previous game, on his way to the final, the film shows an inaccurate checkmating move. The scene shows White (Luzhin) play an apparently brilliant combination culminating in a queen sacrifice followed by Rd1-d8#.

However, White's rook on the d1 square is pinned against its king in the corner at h1 by Black's rook on c1, making the checkmate unplayable.

Nevertheless, Luzhin (White) is shown playing the illegal winning move to wild applause from the audience.

The sequence is as follows, Luzhin has just played his rook to e8 (check) although it is not clear if this was a capture or not. Play then continues:

- 1. ... Bf8
- 2. Rxf8+ Kxf8
- 3. Nf5+ Kg8
- 4. Qf8+ Kxf8
- 5. Rd8#

White's last move is illegal (see rules of chess). Moving the rook would put White in check, which is prohibited.

In the film, the Black rook was erroneously placed on c1 instead of c2, where it was in the actual game this winning combination was played, making it legal, a famous win of Milan Vidmar over future world champion Max Euwe.

== Release ==
The film opened in 59 cinemas in the United Kingdom on 8 September 2000 and grossed £59,779 in its opening weekend, placing at 15th at the UK box office.
