= Infopoverty =

Infopoverty is the name given to the Programme and the World Conference started in 2001, in the ambit of the United Nations, aimed to fight poverty towards the application of ICT, Information and Communication Technologies. The term has been coined in 1998 by Arch. Pierpaolo Saporito, Founder and President of OCCAM, the Observatory on Digital Communication and Gerardo Zepeda-Bermudez, Vice-President and Member of the Board.

== Infopoverty World Conference ==
The Infopoverty World Conference is the annual international conference, under the auspices of the United Nations, at the United Nations headquarters, New York, organized by OCCAM, together with the European Parliament, UNESCO, and other scientific and university institutions (Infopoverty Institute at Oklahoma University). At its 13th edition, the Infopoverty World Conference saw the participation of more than 100 international organizations, hundreds of from Governments, international and regional organizations, public and private institutions and the civil society and 63 countries.

== Infopoverty Programme ==
The Infopoverty Programme transfers into concrete actions the orientations emerged from the Conference, realizing the ICT Villages, aimed to help the most disadvantaged communities. The first pilot projects were realized at San Ramon and San Pedro, Honduras, in cooperation with the local Ministry of Science and Technologies, following the devastation from Hurricane Mitch. These experiences were instrumental for the definition, thanks to the collaboration with the most important international institutions, of the ICT Village model, validated by the World Summit on the Information Society in Tunis, 2005, with the creation of the Borj Touil Village. Subsequently, the model was developed in Sambaina (Madagascar) which was proclaimed Millennium Village Project by the United Nations, and are in progress in Leshoto, in Peru and Ethiopia.
