= Nicole Murgia =

Italian actress

- Born: Rome, Italy
- Occupation: Actress
- Years active: 2004–present

Nicole Murgia is an Italian actress best known for her role of Cristina Giorgi in the Italian television series Tutti pazzi per amore.

She married footballer Andrea Bertolacci on 23 December 2015; her brother Alessandro is also a footballer.

== Selected filmography ==
=== Cinema ===
- Ricordati di me
- Nessun messaggio in segreteria

=== Televisione ===
- Don Matteo 2
- Distretto di Polizia 4
- Nati ieri
- Tutti pazzi per amore
- Din Don – Bianco Natale

=== Web TV ===
- Youtuber$
