= Onde (film) =

2005 Italian romance film

- Directed by: Francesco Fei
- Written by: Francesco Fei; Federica Masin; Pierr Nosari
- Starring: Anita Caprioli
- Cinematography: Matteo de Martini
- Edited by: Claudio Bonafede
- Release date: 2005
- Country: Italy
- Language: Italian

Onde (Waves) is a 2005 Italian romance film directed by Francesco Fei.

== Plot ==
In Genoa Francesca, a girl with a purplish birthmark on his left cheek, and Luca, a blind musician, live lonely lives marked by a deep unhappiness. Their casual meeting at the Aquarium of Genoa will give rise to a tormented love story.

== Cast ==
- Anita Caprioli as Francesca
- Ignazio Oliva as Luca
- Filippo Timi as Alex
- Marina Remi as Marina

== See also ==
- List of Italian films of 2005
