= Sylvain Bellenger =

French art historian, curator and museum director

- Born: 29 April 1955 (age 71); Valognes, Normandy, France
- Occupations: Art historian, curator, museum director

Sylvain Bellenger (born 29 April 1955) is a French art historian, curator and museum director. He served as director general of the Museo di Capodimonte and the Real Bosco di Capodimonte in Naples from 2015 to 2023. Earlier in his career he worked at the Cleveland Museum of Art, the Institut national d'histoire de l'art in Paris and the Art Institute of Chicago.

== Career ==
Bellenger was born in Valognes, Normandy, on 29 April 1955. He studied philosophy and art history in France before beginning his museum career.

From 1987 to 1991 he directed the Musée Girodet in Montargis, followed by the Château and museums of Blois from 1992 to 1999. In 1999 he moved to the United States after being appointed curator of nineteenth-century European painting at the Cleveland Museum of Art. At Cleveland he subsequently headed the Department of European and American Art.

Bellenger conceived the international retrospective Girodet: Romantic Rebel, devoted to Anne-Louis Girodet de Roussy-Trioson. The exhibition opened at the Louvre in 2005 and subsequently travelled to the Art Institute of Chicago, the Metropolitan Museum of Art in New York and the Montreal Museum of Fine Arts.

After leaving Cleveland, he returned to France and became Chief Curator of National Heritage at the Institut national d'histoire de l'art in Paris. In 2012 the Art Institute of Chicago appointed him Searle Chair and Curator of its Department of Medieval through Modern European Painting and Sculpture.

While in Chicago, Bellenger was one of the curators of Félicie de Fauveau: The Amazon Sculptress, the first retrospective devoted to the nineteenth-century French sculptor Félicie de Fauveau. Organised by the Historial de la Vendée and the Musée d'Orsay, it was shown at both institutions in 2013.

=== Capodimonte ===
In August 2015 Bellenger was selected to direct the Museo di Capodimonte in Naples following an international recruitment process introduced as part of a reform of Italy's state museums. He took up the post that year.

Among the exhibitions organised during his directorship was Carta Bianca. Capodimonte Imaginaire in 2017–2018, devised with Andrea Viliani, then director of the Museo MADRE. Ten invited figures from outside the museum profession were each asked to select and arrange works from Capodimonte's collections.

In 2023 Bellenger and Sébastien Allard, director of the Louvre's Department of Paintings, curated Naples in Paris: The Louvre Hosts the Museo di Capodimonte. Running from 7 June 2023 to 8 January 2024, the exhibition brought approximately sixty works from Capodimonte to three locations within the Louvre.

Bellenger concluded his tenure at Capodimonte with Napoli Explosion, an exhibition he curated at the Cellaio in the Real Bosco di Capodimonte. Opened on 14 December 2023, it comprised 37 large-format photographs by Mario Amura devoted to the New Year's Eve fireworks around Mount Vesuvius.

== Honors and awards ==
- Knight of the Order of Legion of Honour
- Knight of the Ordre des Arts et des Lettres
