= Observatory on Digital Communication =

UNESCO project based in Milan, Italy

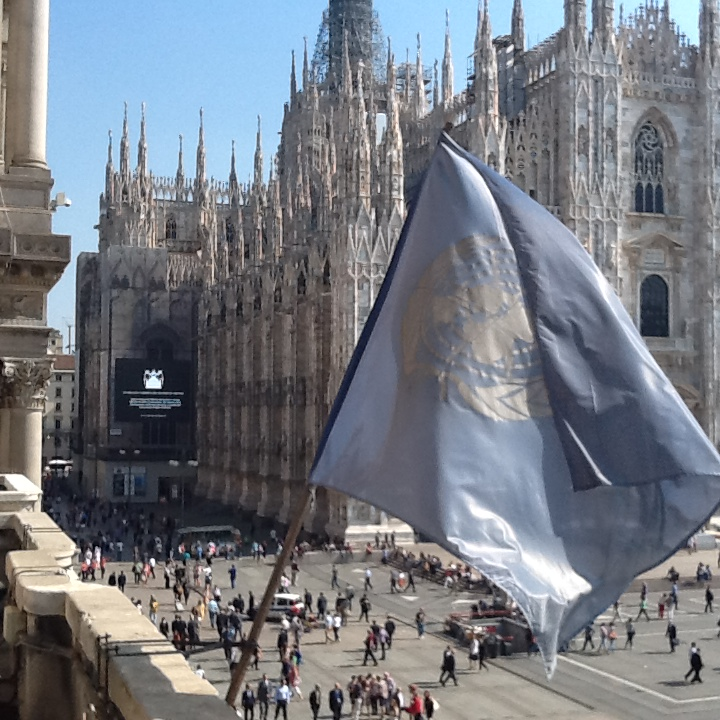
View from the previous OCCAM - Observatory on Digital Communication headquarters, in Milan, Piazza Duomo, with the UNESCO flag.

The Observatory on Digital Communication (OCCAM) was established in 1996 by UNESCO in Milan, with the Agreements signed by the director general, Federico Mayor and Marco Formentini in June 1996. The acronym stands for Observatory for Cultural Communication and Audiovisual in the Mediterranean.

Since 2003, OCCAM has been associated with the United Nations Department of Global Communications (UNDGC) while in 2005 it received Special Consultative Status at the UN's Social and Economic Council (ECOSOC). Since 2006 OCCAM is leader of the e-service for development Community of Expertise within the Global Alliance for Information and Communications Technologies and Development (UN - GAID), initiative launched by the UN Secretary-General Ban Ki-moon in Kuala Lumpur.

The president of the Observatory is the architect Pierpaolo Saporito, who founded it during his presidency at the UNESCO International Council for FIlm Television and Audiovisual Communication (CICT- IFCT), nominated High Level Advisor of the United Nations Global Alliance for ICT and Development.

OCCAM was founded with the mission to fight poverty as effectively as possible using the new technologies and to promote sustainable development actions in the Least Developed Countries (LDCs), and works to support the UN strategies for achieving the Sustainable Development Goals (SDGs), former Millennium Development Goals (MDGs, 2000–2015).

OCCAM's actions, besides its function of Observatory on Digital Communication with studies and research, focuses also on two other main initiatives:

- the Infopoverty World Conference that has been held annually since 2001 in the UNHQ in New York; it takes stock of the phenomena of the digital revolution as it can be employed to strengthen the fight against poverty;
- the Infopoverty Programme that collects the operational suggestions emerging from the conference to turn them into projects realized in various parts of the world.

As part of the Infopoverty program, OCCAM promoted the foundation of the Infopoverty Institute at the University of Oklahoma in 2004, to spread the Infopoverty vision in the American academic world, having as its scope to improve the living conditions of the population with ICT.

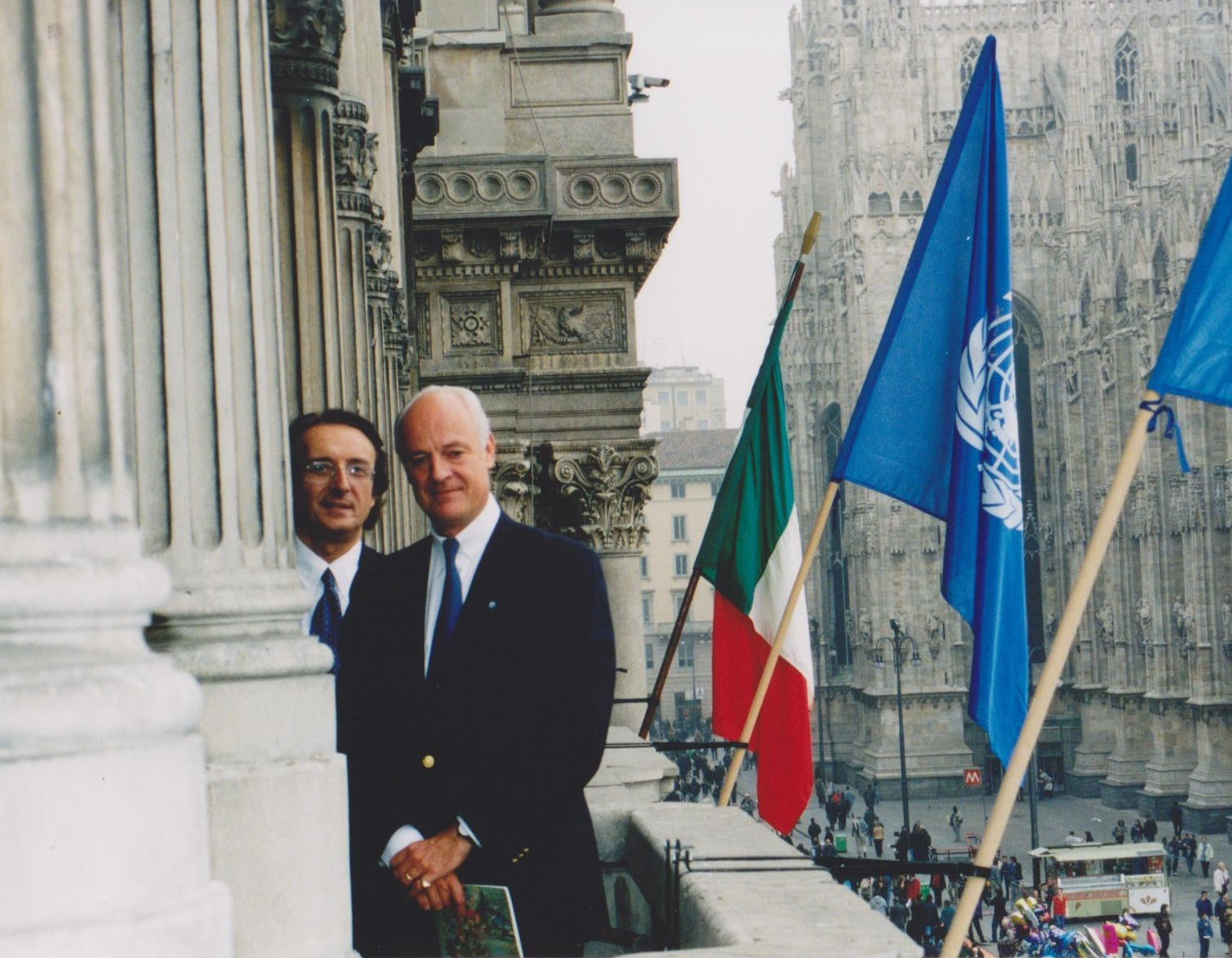
The president of OCCAM - Observatory on Digital Communication, Pierpaolo Saporito with Staffan de Mistura at the previous Observatory's headquarters in Milan, Piazza Duomo, on the occasion of the UN celebration day.

== Infopoverty World Conference ==
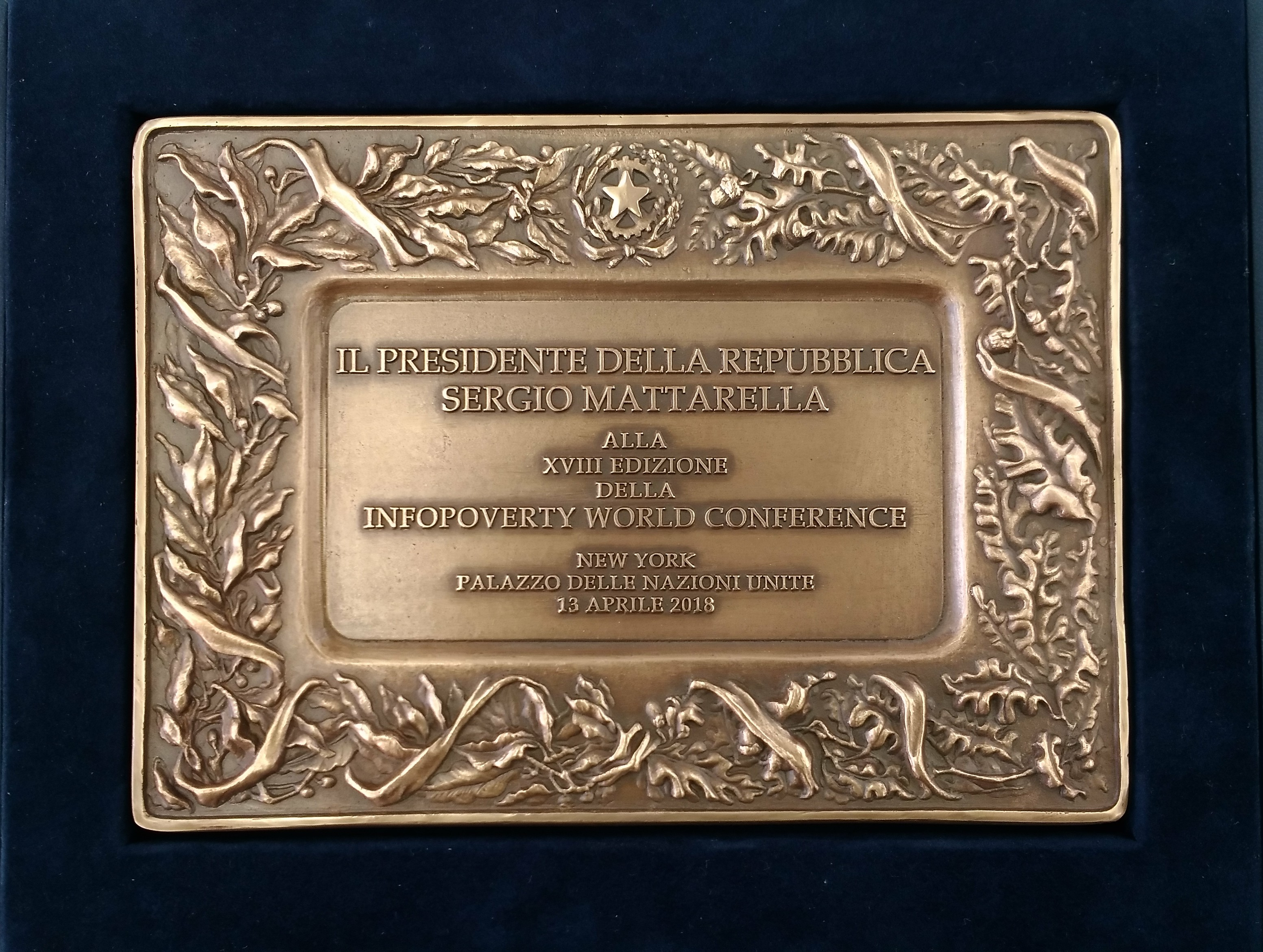
Plaque conferred by the President of the Italian Republic, Sergio Mattarella, to the 18° edition of the Infopoverty World Conference of 13 April 2018, held at the United Nations headquarters, New York.

Infopoverty World Conference is one of the best-known initiatives of OCCAM, founded in 2001.

Since then, the conference has been held annually at the UN seat in New York. Considered as one Flagship Event, over the years it has seen more than a thousand representatives of large international organizations and institutions, avant-garde companies, universities and pioneers of the digital revolution, to find winning digital solutions for fighting poverty and sustainable development.

Since its inception, the IWC has reached a high government level, thanks to the presence of high-ranking officials such as: Staffan de Mistura, general secretary personal representative; Armida de Lopez Contreras, Vice President of Honduras; John Negroponte, former US Ambassador, Israel Chris, deputy secretary US department of Commerce (which announced in 2003 the creation of the Millennium Challenge Account by the Bush administration); Sonia Mendieta de Badaroux, president of the UNESCO General Assembly; Hisanori Isomura, president of CICT-UNESCO and ambassador of Japan in Paris; Mario Baccini, Italian foreign minister; Carlos A. Braga, director of the World Bank; Donaldo Ochoa, director of the Central American Bank for Economic Integration; Giuseppe Gargani, president of the European Parliament's Media and Culture Committee; Adriana de Kanter, director of the US Department of Education; Guido Podestà, vice-president of the European Parliament; Arturo Vallarino, vice-president of the Republic of Panama; John Shirley, president of the Navajo Nation; John Gage, co-founder Sun Microsystems; Hamadoun Touré, secretary general of the ITU; Shashi Tharoor, deputy secretary-general of the United Nations Communications and Public Information; Montassar Ouali, Tunisian Minister of Communication; Enrique Planas, secretary of the Pontifical Commission for Social Communication; Sarbuland Khan, Director UN – GAID; and many others.

In 2003, the ICT Village model, a project that is still active in the Infopoverty Programme, was formalized during the first phase of the World Summit Information Society (WSIS) in Geneva.

In 2002 the Infopoverty Programme was born from the conference to promote the validated projects and implement them concretely in the countries most in need.

The conferences over the years have been organized in partnership with the European Parliament, Office of Milan, and have received the high patronage of the President of the Republic, the patronage of the presidency of the Council of Ministers and other national and international institutions.

The annual editions of Infopoverty held at the UN seat in New York are always in videoconference with other institutional offices in the world, such as: Brussels, European Commission; Paris, UNESCO; Milan, (Office of the European Parliament, the University of Milan, the Catholic University of Milan and the Polytechnic University of Milan) and numerous other locations around the globe.

The 2018 edition of the conference, the 18th, entitled Collective creativity and digital innovation: forging inclusive partnerships to sustain peace and development, was held on 13 April 2018 as usual at the UN NY, room 12 and saw 49 speakers. This latest edition, like the previous ones starting in 2012, has been made accessible by the UN TV streaming site.

=== List of Conferences ===
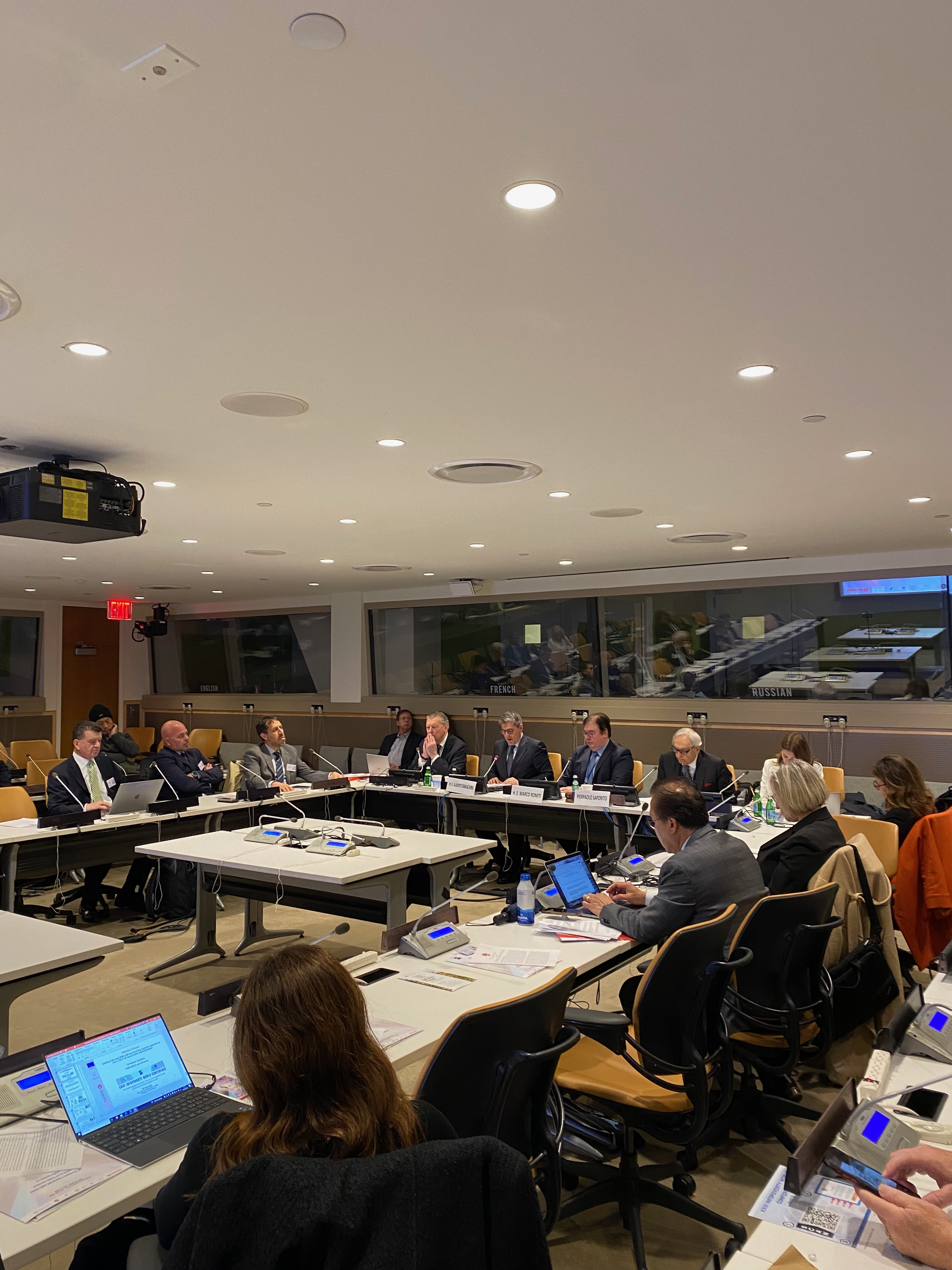
The 23rd edition of the Infopoverty World Conference held on April 12, 2024, at the UNHQ (CR11) in New York

- I Infopoverty, 2001 Possible solutions
- II Infopoverty, 2002 From possible solutions to actions
- III Infopoverty, 2003 New tools and best practices for development. The role of ICTs in reaching the MDGs
- IV Infopoverty, 2004 New frontiers of the ICTs: services for development
- V Infopoverty, 2005 Actors and strategies for development sigital technology to fight poverty
- VI Infopoverty, 2006 Fighting poverty to create prosperity for all
- VII Infopoverty, 2007 Harnessing the use of ICTs toward the Millennium Development Goals
- VIII Infopoverty, 2008 Low coast – Smart technologies to fight poverty and save the planet
- IX Infopoverty, 2009 ICT’S good use, abuse, refuse towards the Millennium Development Goals
- X Infopoverty, 2010 How the digital revolution can defeat poverty and Achieve the Lisbon and Millennium Development Goals
- XI Infopoverty, 2011 E-Services: The new paradigm for development and the achievement of the MDGs
- XII Infopoverty, 2012 Who drives the digital revolution? Development through innovation
- XIII Infopoverty, 2013 ICT – Innovations for Nation building and the empowerment of people
- XIV Infopoverty, 2014 How the digital innovations can accelerate the achievement of the Millennium Development Goals and help the Sustainable Development Goals
- XV Infopoverty, 2015 Next sustainable development goals: the challenge before the Digital Era
- XVI Infopoverty, 2016 ICTs as the tools for everyone to achieve dignity and freedom
- XVII Infopoverty, 2017 Transferring knowledge and adequate technologies: the way to combat poverty and make the world safer
- XVIII Infopoverty, 2018 Collective creativity and digital innovation: forging inclusive partnership to sustain peace and development
- XIX Infopoverty, 2019 How smart cities can fight poverty eliminating slums and promoting smart villages for rural development
- XX Infopoverty, 2020 Towards the Digital Society inspired by SDGs
- XXI Infopoverty, 2021 How to build a fairer and more inclusive Digital Society?
- XXII Infopoverty, 2022 The Digital Citizen: Duties and Rights to Build a Fairer Future Society
- XXIII Infopoverty, 2024 AI turmoils digital process: how to act to ensure human rights and provide e-welfare for all?"
- XXIV Infopoverty 2025 How could AI fight poverty, creating well-being for all?"

=== Infopoverty seminars ===
As a follow-up to the Infopoverty Conferences held annually in spring at the UN seat in New York, OCCAM was invited to hold in-depth seminars at the Palais des Nations in Geneva.

In particular, in 2003 the Seminar was held during the first phase of the WSIS (World Summit on the Information Society), where the Infopoverty Programme was launched.

In 2005, in the next phase of Tunis, OCCAM organized a second Seminar during which they presented the WSIS ICT Village in Borji Ettouil as a model of large-scale application. Furthermore, a memorandum was signed with ITU (International Communication Union) and Navajo Nation for the creation of the Indigenous Portal, and managed the WSIS-TV, on ITU delegation.

Other Infopoverty seminars were held later, always at the Palais des Nations in Geneva, in conjunction with the work of the UN Commission for Science and Technology or the Annual Ministerial Review, accompanied by illustrative expositions at the ECOSOC biennial Innovation Fair.

== Infopoverty programme ==
The Infopoverty programme, born at the instigation of the Infopoverty Conferences as a moment of implementation of the related resolutions, deals with the development of operational projects in favor of the most disadvantaged communities, using new technologies, from solar to web, providing internet connections and digital services, oriented towards the achievement of the UN Sustainable Development Goals (SDGs).

Many projects have been launched over the years, including ICT Villages to redeem poorer communities (SDG 1) from poverty, eMedMed for telemedicine (SDG 3), World Food & Health Security e-Center for agricultural development and food security, (SDG 2). The Program is updated annually at each UN Infopoverty conference and illustrated with specific exposures.

=== ICT Villages ===
The ICT Village project stems from the need to provide technologies and services to the most disadvantaged communities to enable them to promote their own development. The replicable model of ICT Village focuses on three types of intervention: i) ensuring an education to young people aimed at enhancing local resources and creating jobs, ii) ensuring a basic level of health, iii) providing internet access to the whole community to strengthen its capacity for socio-economic development.

The ICT Village model, developed and launched by OCCAM has had a large echo, influencing deeply different levels of the society: the model has even been cited by the USSTRATCOM Global Innovation and Strategy Center in one of its document concerning the Village Infrastructure Kit-Alpha (VIKA).

The first ICT village project was carried out in 1999 in Honduras, hit by the devastating hurricane Mitch. With the support of the Ministry of Science and Technology (COHCIT) and the local University (UCyT) and the main international organizationsit was possible to implement two projects initially called Solar Village in the communities of San Ramon and San Francisco de Lempira. Thanks to the use of solar panels and the first satellite equipped for the Internet of OnSatNet, the supply of electricity was guaranteed, and a connection to 108 mb / sec, a real record for the time, able to provide more than 30,000 people the first e-learning and telemedicine services provided, allowing the population to use these new technologies advantageously and to connect to the rest of the world through e-commerce and e-government initiatives.

Presented and discussed in the various IWC 2001–2003, the model is proposed to the Government of Tunisia for an experimentation in the village of Borji Ettouil at the WSIS Summit in November 2003. The success of this WSIS-ICT Village - supported by the National Solidarity Fund and visited by numerous government delegations and personalities, who appreciated the operational applications of telemedicine, e-learning and internet community access - allows validating their effectiveness and opens the doors to numerous invitations to replicate it over the years in various countries, including Peru, Ethiopia, Dominican Republic, Lesotho, Tunisia, Ghana, South Lebanon, Navajo Nation, Madagascar.

In particular, in the village of Meiss al-Jabal, in South Lebanon, born from a collaboration with Staffan de Mistura, High Representative of the UN Secretary General in the region, as a support action for the refugee communities, it was provided with two digitized classrooms, satellite connection and various specialized devices for remote consultation and assistance services, obtaining a rapid professionalization of the students, to offer them hope for the future. Unfortunately, with the war events of 2006, many villages have been destroyed, including Meiss al-Jabal. In Lebanon. Moreover, OCCAM promoted the birth of the Beirut Film Festival with the Ministry of Culture and the International Council for International Cinema and Television, and the reconstruction of the National Film Archive to make a contribution to the UN Peacekeeping action.

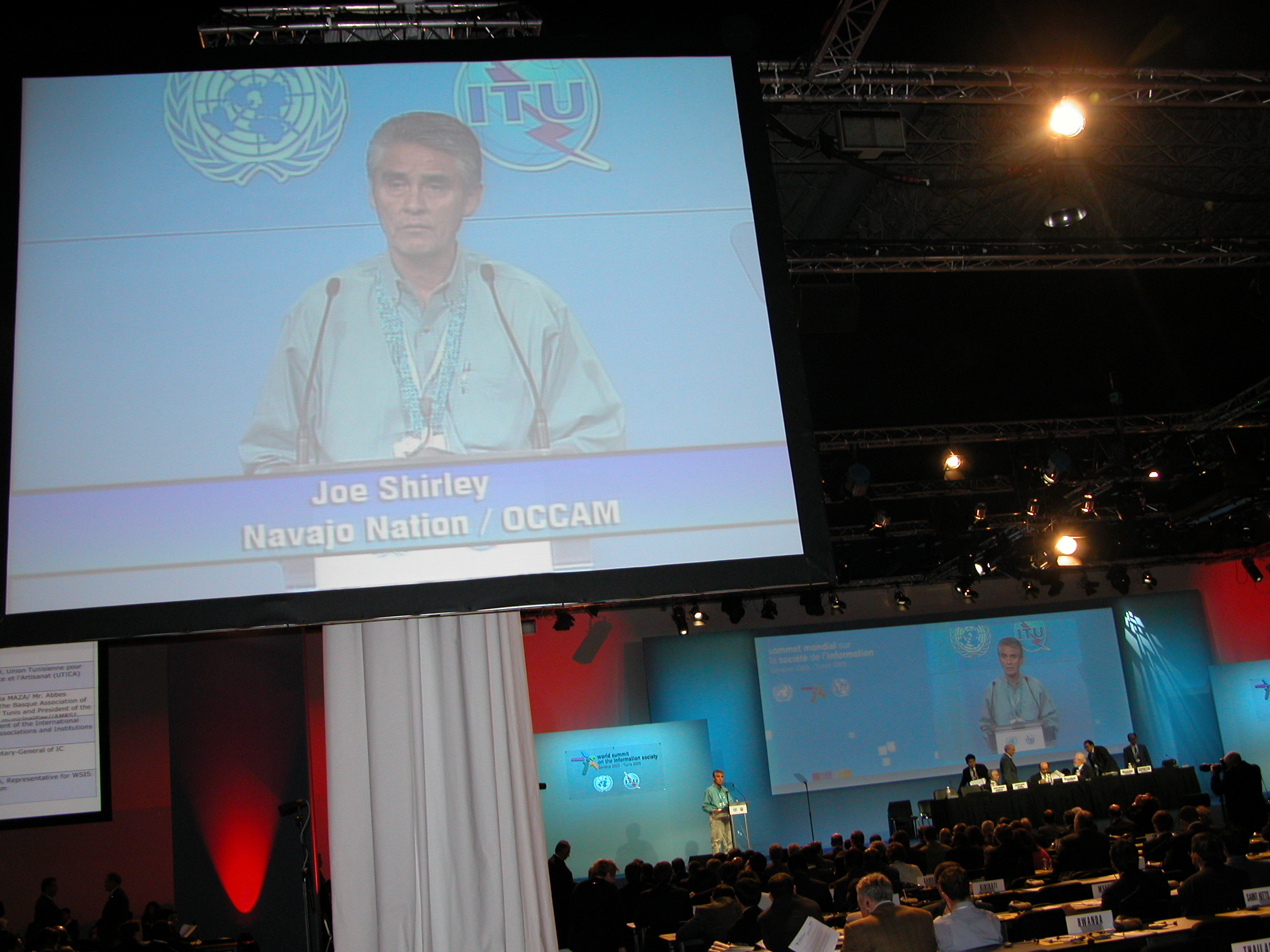
John Shirley, at that time, President of the Navajo Nation, at the WSIS - Tunis, 2005, where he announced the birth of the Navajo Nation Portal.

Another important project is the Navajo Nation Portal, announced in 2005 during the intervention at the WSIS in Tunis by John Shirley, president of the Navajo Nation co-signatory of the Memorandum of understanding with ITU and OCCAM, for the development of digitalization in indigenous populations, which sees the creation in many pueblos of access and training centers.

A longlasting project is the ICT Village of Sambaina, born also thanks to the support of the then president of the Malgasy Republic S.E. Marc Ravalomanana.

Here the project has been developed focusing on:

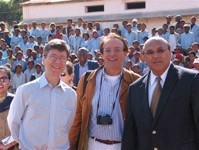
2006, Jeffrey Sachs with Pierpaolo Saporito, president of OCCAM and the Permanent Representative of Madagascar to the United Nations, Zina Andrianarivelo at the Sambaina ICT Village. In this occasion Sambaina was proclaimed Millennium Village by Jeffrey Sachs.

• telemedicine, with the establishment of a new digitalized health unit, especially on maternal care, achieving a reduction in pre-postpartum and early childhood mortality,

• e-learning, with classes equipped with computers and other digital devices and courses.

• center for internet access for the population of the district.

All the vast territory, after a first satellite coverage provided by Eutelsat / Skylogic, was connected in broadband using the state frequencies, so that hospitals, schools, municipalities, operated without charges, stating the principle, then decided in UN-GAID, that public services must be able to take advantage of public broadband networks.

Sambaina soon arouses international attention, including the visit of Jeffrey Sachs, director of the UN Millennium Project and special advisor of the secretary general Kofi Annan, who proclaimed him in 2006 the first and only one of its kind, Millennium Village towards which both UNDP and the Millennium Challenge Corporation USA will launch support programs.

In support of Sambaina and the other ICT Village, OCCAM launched the Ville Village Project in 2005 to encourage direct collaboration between communities in developing countries and cities in advanced countries, which have greatly encouraged the integration in the perspective of mutual cultural and social enrichment and in order to optimize the resources put in place by both local authorities and NGOs in development cooperation projects.

The first Ville-Village realization was ratified with the agreement signed by the Ambassador of Madagascar in Itala, SE Jean Pierre Razafi, on 4 December 2008, and the mayor of Lodi Lorenzo Guerini, Within this initiative the city of Lodi has been selected to better employ the features of its territory, such as the Padano Technology Park, the hospital (already active in the telemedicine sector) and the NGOs operating in its territory. Innovative digital development service centers have also been created, focusing on e-phytopathology, and e-veterinary.

The ICT Village of Mahobong, in Lesotho, experimented in 2007 the Digital Services Global Platform, both in the field of Food Security with applications of e-phytopathology and parasitology and of telemedicine, through a new ultrasound device, which allow remote ultrasounds suitable for prevent pre- and post-natal mortality and assist emergency interventions. The project realized by OCCAM in collaboration with the Department of Protection of Agrifood and Urban Systems and Biodiversity Valorization of the University of Milan and with the International Telemedicine Institute (IITM), supported by the Municipality of Milan, has allowed to export knowledge in the field of cultivation and protection of plants and food and limit production losses caused to production, giving considerable development to the communities involved.

=== eMedMed project ===
eMedMed is the project born in the context of the Union for the Mediterranean; it aims to promote a more widespread and efficient diffusion of the health service in Tunisia, Morocco, Libya and Egypt, through telemedicine. It is the result of the experimentation of over 15 years of applications in the various ICT Village in the field of maternal care, emergencies, cardiology, and traumatology.

It has been selected among the most relevant projects for the development of the Mediterranean by the French Senate. On 20 June 2014, it was presented during the Conference Au-delà des frontières: les partenariats euro-méditerranéens par ceux qui les font

The project was validated at the UNHQ in New York in 2015 at the XV Infopoverty World Conference.

The goal is to improve health conditions in the Southern Mediterranean countries through the participation of a network of clinical centers and European experts connected with local structures through a specific platform with ICT Solutions and innovative scientific m-devices. The system integrates the resources of hospitals and service centers in the area and the data collected in the field (diagnostic imaging, medical records, patient records, consultations, training etc.) through the network, optimizing, which would also allow in our country, the 'home care of the patient, reducing costs and optimizing the use of resources. Focal moment for the operational definition of the project was the XXI Euromediterranean Conference, held in Catania on 26–27 February 2016, in which the E-MedMed Memorandum of Understanding was signed in the presence of representatives of the Italian Government, OCCAM and the Municipality of Catania to create the Hub Center of Catania for Health Security, Migrant Emergency and Solidarity Development in the Mediterranean Basin.

The project had the chance to collaborate with the IRCCS Bonino health facilities Pulejo of Messina and Provincial Health Authority of Catania, while numerous actors have participated in the development of the Hub: IITM (International Institute of TeleMedicine), Nile Badrawi Foundation for Education and Development in Egypt, Tripoli National Diabetes Hospital and the National Center for Disease Control in Libya, Moroccan Society for TeleMedicine and e-Health in Morocco, Association for Promoting Pulmonology and Allergology in Tunisia. in order to strengthen their capacity to use existing resources - often completely neglected - and start them towards a path of self-sustainable development that respects the environment and human rights.

==== World Food&Health Security e-Center ====
The centre was created for MilanEXPO 2015 and launched at the International Conference "Beyond EXPO: The New Digital Services for Food Security" held at the Palazzo Lombardia in Milan in October 2015. The center was adopted on 17 November 2016 at the COP22 - UN summit on climate change in Marrakech. The center is also distinguished by the use of sustainable and modular technologies, which rely on clean energy like the ones obtained from photovoltaics.

The center, validated at the XVIII Infopoverty World Conference on 13 April 2018, can provide phytopathology, parasitology, remote diagnosis and analysis, soil and food evaluation, crop monitoring and soil protection. and analysis of water potability; telemedicine services such as radiology, ultrasound, extended to basic veterinary and cold chain testing services along the food supply chain. Moreover, the hub will form, thanks to new ICT technologies, new generation of experts and technicians, through a network of service providers such as AISSA (Italian Association of Agricultural Scientific Societies), the University of Milan, the University of Sassari, the Padano Technology Park, Smithers Foundation and others.

=== Infopoverty programme exhibitions ===
Simultaneously with the various conferences and seminars, OCCAM has set up exhibitions illustrating its activities and the results achieved. In particular, there are the exhibitions in the Bramante Cloisters of the Catholic University of Milan 2001, at the Polytechnic of Milan, at the Palais des Nations in Genevra for the WSIS 2003 and the Ecosoc Innovation Fair 2007, 2009, 2011, 2013 in the central pavilion of the 2005 WSIS in Tunis and also at the Glass Palace in New York. A large Infopoverty Exhibition, entitled "New technologies for development" was held in 2007 at the Milan Fair on the occasion of the BUILD UP event with the virtual reconstruction of an ICT Village, where were presented the most interesting innovations in the ICT4D field at the service of sustainable development, by all the partners of the Program: UNESCO, ESA, European Parliament, International Federation of the Red Cross, City of Milan, Casa della Carità, Polytechnic of Milan, Bicocca University, Catholic University of the Sacred Heart, University of Oklahoma, Eutelsat, Pathologists, and delegation of the Dominican Republic and of Peru, over the border; S. Donato Hospital. A fixed Space TV station guaranteed the constant transmission of all the daily meetings.

OCCAM co-produced in 2010 for the UN pavilion at EXPO in Shanghai the film The Earth, Our Home directed by Pierpaolo Saporito and Vittorio Giacci, which illustrates the effects of human action on climate change. The film was screened at UNESCO in 2012. Many numerous well-known names and Oscar awards collaborated in the making of the film including Ennio Morricone composer of the musical themes of the first and last chapter, F. Murray Abraham who participated as narrator, Luis Bacalov, Michel Nyman, Arvo Part, Philip Glass, Ayub Ogada, Nello Salza, Andrea Bocelli.

== The operational structure of OCCAM ==
The Observatory is organized into 5 segments:

1. Observatory on the phenomena of the digital revolution;
2. Research and experimentation, on social-oriented ICT innovations;
3. Infopoverty conference, which organizes the annual IWC in NY;
4. Infopoverty programme for monitoring and management of the projects;
5. Communication and secretariat.

OCCAM makes use of qualified high-level advisors, grouped in specific task forces, with a promotion and development committee.

The observatory has two representations at the UN, one in New York and one in Geneva and an international head of Institutional Relations.

== UNESCO and European Parliament partnership ==
Since its foundation, the observatory has had a close relationship with UNESCO, which originated it in 1996 as a special project associated with the Mediterranean Program, a network of agencies and institutions aimed at supporting the Barcelona Agreement of 1995 on free trade Euro-Mediterranean.

In this context, OCCAM assisted the organization of the "1st Euro-Mediterranean Conference on Cinema", under the patronage of the president of the Italian Republic, held in Venice in September 1995, with the UNESCO International Council on Cinema and Television, and the European Parliament, Rome office.

These annual conferences form a forum where the various protagonists of the Region work on the role that cinema and new media can play in the process of integration of the Mediterranean, identifying and promoting concrete initiatives to support the Euro-Mediterranean dialogue; in twenty years, the Euro-Mediterranean Conferences on Cinema have seen among its participants representatives of governments, international organizations, public and private institutions, experts in the new media and men and women of culture; this initiative has promoted and supported important initiatives in the Mediterranean, such as: the Euromed Audiovisuel program for cinema support policy; the Copeam for public televisions; the Film Festivals of Tirana, Ohrid, Zagreb, Beirut, Gaza, Kouribka, Kalamata, Menorca; the rencontres cinèma of Hammammet; the relaunch of the Antalya Festival in Turkey, the first Euro-Asian festival.

In 2016 the XXI Conference was held on 26 and 27 February in Catania with the theme of the Mediterranean in the Digital Era and focused on Health Security, Migrant Emergency and Solidarity Development in the Mediterranean Basin, with important contributions from the mayor of Catania Enzo Bianco, the ministerial undersecretaries Giuseppe Castiglione, Domenico Manzione, Vito De Filippo and Benedetto Della Vedova, senior representatives of the coastal countries, partners of the eMedMed project, and the president of OCCAM and Infopoverty Pierpaolo Saporito, who underlined how the conference goes beyond cinema and television to widen the field of digital communication, and can be integrated as a regional contribution to the worldwide mission of Infopoverty.

== See also ==
- Infopoverty
