= Boudjemaa Kareche =

- Born: 1941 (age 84–85); Algiers, Algeria
- Occupations: Film director, cinematheque director, actor, cultural animator
- Notable work: Boudjemâa et la Maison Cinéma

Boudjemaa Kareche (born in 1941 in Algiers) is a prominent figure of Algerian cinema, known for his role as animator and later director of the Cinémathèque d'Alger from 1971 to 2003. He is recognized for his commitment to promoting Algerian and African cinema and for his participation in several films and documentaries. He is also the subject of the 2021 documentary film Boudjemâa et la Maison Cinéma.

== Biography ==
Boudjemâa Karèche was born in 1941 in Algiers. He graduated with a law degree from the University of Algiers and became involved early in film and cultural activities. He began working at the Algerian Cinematheque in 1971 and became its director in 1978. Under his leadership, the Cinémathèque d'Alger became a central space for film screenings, debates, and preservation in Algeria, even during difficult times such as the 1995 bombings that affected neighboring halls but did not halt screenings.

== Career ==
During his tenure, the Algerian Cinematheque hosted numerous international events, retrospectives, and cultural exchanges. Kareche contributed for decades to Algeria’s cultural and cinephile life. He also appeared in films as an actor and has been the subject of documentaries and tributes in festivals and specialized journals.

== Filmography ==
=== As actor ===
- Mughamarat batal (1979) — credited on IMDb
- Premier pas (1979) — listed on Africiné / IMDb
- Boudjemâa et la Maison Cinéma (documentary, 2021) — directed by Mohamed Latrèche, a film centered on Karèche as a witness and living memory of Algerian cinema.

== Publications and appearances ==
Kareche has taken part in conferences, round tables, and publications about Maghrebi and African cinema. He organized film cycles and presentations at European festivals (Apt, Marseille, Paris) and was invited as a speaker for retrospectives and tributes.

== Awards ==
- 2025 Vittorio Boarini Award (granted by the Cineteca di Bologna / reported by APS and local archives).
