= 32 dicembre =

- Directed by: Luciano De Crescenzo
- Written by: Luciano De Crescenzo; Lidia Ravera
- Starring: Luciano De Crescenzo; Caterina Boratto
- Cinematography: Danilo Desideri
- Music by: Tullio De Piscopo
- Release date: 1988
- Country: Italy
- Language: Italian

32nd of December is a 1988 Italian comedy film written and directed by Luciano De Crescenzo. It is loosely based on the De Crescenzo's novel Oi Dialogoi.

For his performance Enzo Cannavale won the Nastro d'Argento for best supporting actor.

== Cast ==
- Luciano De Crescenzo: Psichiatra/confessore/astronomo
- Caterina Boratto: Carlotta
- Renato Scarpa: Oscar
- Massimo Serato: Ferruccio Ceravolo
- Enzo Cannavale: Alfonso Caputo
- Tommaso Bianco: brother of Alfonso
- Silvio Ceccato: Cavaliere Ercole Sanfilippo/Socrate
- Benedetto Casillo: Salvatore Coppola/Antistene
- Sergio Solli: Saverio Pezzullo/Aristippo
- Gerardo Scala: Marlon Cacace/Diogene
- Roberta Orlandi: Caterina/Mirto
- Riccardo Cucciolla: General Emanuele Anselmi
- Nuccia Fumo: Antonietta Bisogno
- Nunzia Fumo: Adelina Bisogno
- Vanessa Gravina: Mimma
- Antonio Allocca: merciaio
- Franco Javarone: Peppe o' criminale
- Riccardo Pazzaglia: cliente del bar

== See also ==
- List of Italian films of 1988
