= International Council for Film Television and Audiovisual Communication =

International Council for Film, Television and Audiovisual Communication (ICFT)
- Type: NGO
- Headquarters: Paris
- Coordinates: 48.8462°N 2.3053°E
- Region served: Worldwide
- Official language: English, French
- President: Inoussa Ousseini
- Affiliations: UNESCO
- Website: Official website
- Formerly called: International Council for Film and Television

The International Council for Film, Television and Audiovisual Communication, formerly the International Film and Television Council (ICFT), is the UNESCO advisory body on all matters concerned with film, television and new media. Located at UNESCO HQ's in Paris, France, was founded in UNESCO's 9th session of General Conference in 1956.

== History ==
Under the chairmanship of Professor Paul Rivet, in 1955, UNESCO organised a series of consultations to further the work of the International Institute of Educational Cinema, which was previously affiliated to the League of Nations.

On the occasion of the General Conference of UNESCO, held in New Delhi in 1956, the project of establishing an International Institute of Cinema and Television was presented by Mario Verdone, head of the Italian delegation, and approved. The study was entrusted to Jean Benoît-Lévy, filmmaker, honorary director of the United Nations Cinema, assisted by a group of twelve international experts.

The Constitutional Charter of ICFT was signed on 23 October 1958. The most important federations and associations working in the field of audiovisuals and media became the founding members of the ICFT.

In 1980, with the emergence of new technologies, Enrico Fulchignoni, director of artistic and literary creation at UNESCO and president of the ICFT, decided to add audiovisual communication to the missions of the council.

Since the creation of the ICFT, the presidency has been succeeded by: John Maddison (ISFA), Jean d'Arcy (RTF-UN), Raymond Ravar (CILECT), Mario Verdone (CIDALC), Fred Orain (Production), Enrico Fulchignoni (UNESCO), Gérard Bolla (UNESCO) Christopher Roads (British Library), Jean Rouch (CIFES), Daniel Van Espen (Signis), Pierpaolo Saporito (OCCAM), Jean-Michel Arnold (Camera), Hisanori Isomura (NHK) and Inoussa Ousseini (UNESCO).

== Mission ==
The aim of the ICFT is to:

- stimulate the creation and promote the production and distribution of high standard audiovisual works;
- advise international organizations and States on the implementation of artistic, educational and industrial policies;
- create a synergy among creators, professionals and media executives by developing collaboration within its members, especially in the service of the broad orientations of UNESCO;
- set up an arena where different professionals in the field of audiovisual, especially the young people can present their views and suggestions to an international audience;
- encourage training and research in all audiovisual areas, including media education, and offer a space for reflection on the development of technologies in the service of creation, education and culture;
- contribute to the efforts of development of communication, especially in the field of free flow of information.

The ICFT celebrated its 50th birthday at UNESCO on 23 October 2008.

== Officers and Executive Committee ==
=== President ===
Pierpaolo Saporito was chosen as ad interim president after the death of the former President of CICT-ICFT Inoussa Ousseini, Niger's ambassador to UNESCO and former head of Niger's permanent delegation at UNESCO. Pierpaolo Saporito is also president of the Observatory on Digital Communication.

=== Vice presidents ===
- Serge Michel (France): representing UNICA

=== Executive Members ===
- Agnès Ravoyard (France): representing SIGNIS - World Catholic Association for Communication
- Isabelle Danel (France): representing FIPRESCI - International Federation of Film Critics

=== Director General ===
- Georges Dupont (Luxembourg), ORTF-TDF-INA-UNESCO

=== Treasurer ad interim ===
- Georges Dupont (Luxembourg), ORTF-TDF-INA-UNESCO

=== Consultant ===
- Xueyuan HUN (China)

=== Members ===
- CICAE: Confédération Internationale des Cinémas d'Art et d'Essai: represented by Boglárka Nagy, Delegate-General
- COPEAM: Conférence Permanente de l'Audiovisuel Méditerranéen
- EUROVISIONI: Festival Internazionale di Cinema e Televisione: represented by Giacomo Mazzone, secretary-general
- FICA, International Film Festival of Algiers (Algeria): represented by Ahmed Bedjaoui, artistic director
- OCCAM: Observatory on Digital Communication, represented by Pierpaolo Saporito, president
- PCI, Platform for Creativity & Innovation: represented by Xueyuan Hun, director
- SIGNIS: World Catholic Association for Communication; Represented by Agnès Ravoyard
- UNAFF, United Nations Association Film Festival (USA): represented by Jasmina Bojic, director
- UNICA: Union Internationale du Cinéma, represented by Serge Michel, delegate
- Italian National Committee of CICT-ICFT, represented by Pierpaolo Saporito
- IMC, Instructional Media Centre - MANUU (A Central University) (India), represented by Rizwan Ahamd, director
- 24 Frames Entertainment (India), represented by Manouj Kadaamh, Director

== Activities ==
The principal role of the IFTC is to be the channel to and from UNESCO for all matters relating to film television audiovisual communication and the new media. This includes i) advising UNESCO on its "Creative Cities of Cinema" program, ii) participating in the planning of UNESCO programmes, iii) being closely associated with UNESCO's Division on "Freedom of Information" within the Culture and Communications sector, iv) carrying out surveys at UNESCO's request, etc.

It also organizes festivals (with the award "Prix du CICT"), workshops (e.g. for training the handicapped in audiovisual techniques) and adult education programs, as well as convening debates and meetings for specialists in education, science or culture.
