= Saimir =

Saimir is a masculine given name of Albanian origin. Notable people with this name include:

- Saimir Dauti, Albanian football player
- Saimir Kodra, Albanian journalist
- Saimir Kumbaro, Albanian filmmaker
- Saimir Malko, Albanian football player
- Saimir Korreshi, Albanian jurist and politician
- Saimir Patushi, Albanian football player
- Saimir Pirgu, Albanian opera singer
- Saimir Strati, Albanian mosaic artist
- Saimir Tahiri, Albanian politician

== See also ==
- Saimir (film)
