= Anita Caprioli =

Italian theatre and film actress

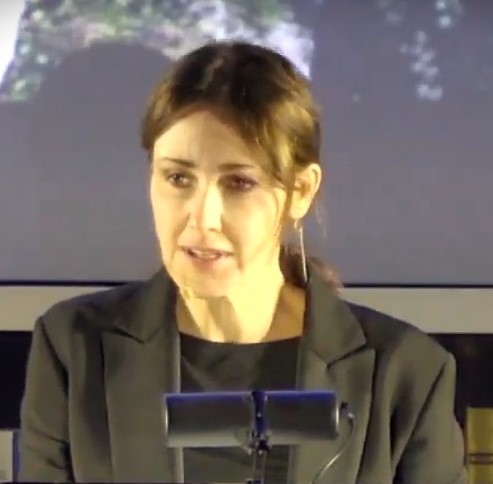
- Caprioli dramatic reading in 2021
- Born: 11 December 1973 (age 52); Vercelli, Italy
- Occupation: Actress

Anita Caprioli (born 11 December 1972) is an Italian theatre and film actress.

== Biography ==
Born in Vercelli, Piedmont, the daughter of a stage actress, Caprioli made her stage debut in London in 1995 with Andrea Brooks, in an adaptation of Carlo Goldoni's The Mistress of the Inn, and in the following year she starred in Luigi Pirandello's Il Berretto a Sonagli.

In 1997 she took part to her first movie, We All Fall Down, by Davide Ferrario, followed by La donna del treno, directed by Carlo Lizzani.

In 2008 she earned a nomination to Nastro d'Argento for Best Supporting Actress for Don't Think About It. In 2012 she was nominated to the David di Donatello for Best Supporting Actress thanks to her performance in Heavenly Body.

== Filmography ==
- We All Fall Down (1997)
- Fireworks (1997)
- Donne in bianco (1998)
- 20 - Venti (Twenty, 1999)
- Senza movente (1999)
- L'uomo della fortuna (2000)
- Denti (2000)
- Vajont (2001)
- Santa Maradona (2001)
- Sei come sei (2002)
- Il sorriso di Diana (2002)
- It Can't Be All Our Fault (2003)
- Cime tempestose (2004)
- Manual of Love (2005)
- Cielo e terra (2005)
- Mario's War (2005)
- Onde (2005)
- One Out of Two (2006)
- The Demons of St. Petersberg (2007)
- Don't Think About It (2008)
- We Can Do That (2008)
- Good Morning Aman (2009)
- Meu País (2011)
- Interno giorno (2011)
- Heavenly Body (2011)
- The Immature (2011)
- Kryptonite! (2012)
- The Immature: The Trip (2012)
- First Snowfall (2013)
- The Champion (2019)
- The Predators (2020)
- Don't Kill Me (2021)
