= Flirt (1983 film) =

1983 film

- Theatrical release poster
- Directed by: Roberto Russo
- Written by: Roberto Russo; Silvia Napolitano; Monica Vitti
- Produced by: Paolo Infascelli
- Starring: Jean-Luc Bideau; Monica Vitti
- Cinematography: Luigi Kuveiller
- Edited by: Alberto Gallitti
- Music by: Francesco De Gregori
- Release date: 17 November 1983
- Running time: 93 minutes
- Countries: Italy; France
- Language: Italian

Flirt is a 1983 Italian-French drama film directed by Roberto Russo. It was entered into the 34th Berlin International Film Festival where Monica Vitti won the Silver Bear for an outstanding single achievement.

== Plot ==
Laura (Monica Vitti) and Giovanni (Jean-Luc Bideau) are a Roman couple who have been married for twenty years. Their life follows the same routine every day, until Laura begins to suspect her husband of having an extramarital affair. During the night, Giovanni mutters a woman's name in his sleep; he also comes home late in the evening, but his wife learns that the company he works for does not require overtime.

Following Giovanni to their villa in Torvaianica, Laura discovers that her rival is just a figment of her depressed husband's imagination. Giovanni is admitted to a nursing home, but his imaginary lover shows no sign of disappearing. Laura goes to visit him, realizing that it is useless to contradict crazy people. By indulging her husband's hallucination, she will patiently win him back.

== Cast ==
- Jean-Luc Bideau as Giovanni Landini
- Monica Vitti as Laura
- Alessandro Haber as Amerigo
- Marina Confalone
- Eros Pagni
- Monica Pariante
- Marco Piemonte
- Giacomo Piperno
- Giovanni Russo
- Deddi Savagnone
- Vincenzo Spitaleri
- Franco Trevisi
