= Silvio Ceccato =

Italian philosopher and linguist

Silvio Ceccato (Montecchio Maggiore, Italy, 25 January 1914 – Milan, 2 December 1997) was an Italian philosopher and linguist.

Born in Montecchio Maggiore, he studied law and music. In 1949, he founded the international magazine Methodos, which was published until 1964.

In 1956, he designed and built Adamo II, the first Italian prototype of artificial intelligence, which he had intended to reproduce man's mental states. In those same years, he lectured on the philosophy of science at Milan University, where he directed the Cybernetics and Linguistic Studies Centre, until he went to IULM.

In 1988, as an actor, Silvio Ceccato participated in the film 32 December by Luciano De Crescenzo, interpreting the role of the insane Cavalier Sanfilippo who believed himself to be Socrates.

In 1990, Silvio Ceccato presented a Catalogue of the Sarnano City Exhibition “Illuministi e Neoilluministi”.

He later retired from the academic world and wrote books about happiness.

== Works ==
- Il linguaggio con la Tabella di Ceccatieff (1951)
- Adamo II, Congresso Internazionale dell'Automatismo, Milano, 8-13 aprile 1956, pp. 1–8
- Linguistic analysis and programming for mechanical translation (1961)
- Un tecnico fra i filosofi (1962/1964)
- Corso di linguistica operativa (1969)
- Il gioco del Teocono (1971)
- La mente vista da un cibernetico (1972)
- La terza cibernetica. Per una mente creativa e responsabile (1974)
- L'ingegneria della felicità (1985)
- Il linguista inverosimile (1988, with Carlo Oliva)
- Mille tipi di bello (1995)
- C'era una volta la filosofia (1996)

Full Bibliography
