= Paolo Genovese =

Italian director and screenwriter (born 1966)

- Born: 20 August 1966 (age 59); Rome, Italy
- Occupations: Director; Screenwriter
- Height: 1.78 m (5 ft 10 in)

Paolo Genovese (born 20 August 1966) is an Italian director and screenwriter.

== Life and career ==
Born in Rome, after graduating in Economics and Business Genovese started his career at McCann Erickson, directing over one hundred commercials and winning several awards. In 1998 he started collaborating with Luca Miniero co-writing and co-directing the short film La scoperta di Walter; the duo made their feature film debut in 2002, with the critically acclaimed comedy film A Neapolitan Spell.

Genovese made his solo-directing debut in 2010, directing The Santa Claus Gang. In 2016, his film Perfect Strangers won the Award for Best Screenplay in an International Narrative Feature Film at the Tribeca Film Festival and was awarded best film at the David di Donatello Awards.

== Filmography ==
- A Neapolitan Spell (2002, co-directed with Luca Miniero)
- Sorry, You Can't Get Through! (2005, co-directed with Luca Miniero)
- This Night Is Still Ours (2008, co-directed with Luca Miniero)
- The Santa Claus Gang (2010)
- The Immature (2011)
- The Immature: The Trip (2012)
- A Perfect Family (2012)
- Blame Freud (2014)
- Ever Been to the Moon? (2015)
- Perfect Strangers (2016)
- The Place (2017)
- Superheroes (2021)
- The First Day of My Life (2023)
- Madly (2025)
- The Noise of New Things (2026)
