= Roberto Russo (director) =

Italian filmmaker (1947–2025)

Roberto Russo (23 September 1947 – 20 September 2025) was an Italian film director, screenwriter, and photographer known for the 1983 film Flirt. He died on 20 September 2025, at the age of 77.

In 2000, Russo married Monica Vitti, with whom he had been in a relationship since 1983.
