= Così parlò Bellavista =

- Directed by: Luciano De Crescenzo
- Written by: Luciano De Crescenzo; Riccardo Pazzaglia
- Story by: Luciano De Crescenzo (novel)
- Produced by: Mario Orfini
- Starring: Luciano De Crescenzo; Isa Danieli
- Cinematography: Dante Spinotti
- Music by: Claudio Mattone
- Release date: 6 October 1984
- Running time: 105 minutes
- Country: Italy
- Language: Neapolitan

Così parlò Bellavista is a 1984 Italian comedy film based on the novel of the same name by Luciano De Crescenzo. De Crescenzo directed the film and also played the main role. For this film De Crescenzo won David di Donatello and Nastro d'Argento for best new director, while Marina Confalone won the same awards in the best supporting actress category.

== Plot summary ==
In Naples, Professor Bellavista is a retired man, passionate about the philosophy and thought of Ancient Greece. Every day, in his luxurious apartment, he teaches his lessons of life to the poor-nothing (his friends), who are dazzled by his reasoning. One day, however, the quiet life of the building of Bellavista will be disturbed by the arrival of a director of Milan. Between Naples and Milan there is a sharp contrast, because the Neapolitans are accustomed to enjoy a quiet life, always based on the "philosophy of pleasure and delay", while the northern Italians are very strict and punctual.

== Cast ==
- Luciano De Crescenzo - Professor Bellavista
- Isa Danieli - Mrs Bellavista
- Lorella Morlotti - Patrizia
- Geppy Gleijeses - Giorgio
- Marina Confalone - La cameriera
- Renato Scarpa - Cazzaniga
- Antonio Allocca - "Core N'grato"
- Nunzio Gallo - Camorrista
- Riccardo Pazzaglia - L'uomo del cavalluccio rosso
