= Luca Miniero =

Italian director and screenwriter (born 1967)

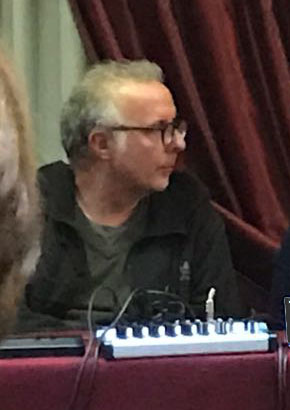
- Born: 17 January 1967 (age 59); Naples, Italy
- Occupations: Director; Screenwriter

Luca Miniero (born 17 January 1967) is an Italian director and screenwriter.

== Life and career ==
Born in Naples, after graduating in Letters Miniero moved to Milan where he started working as a director of commercial shorts. In 1998 he started collaborating with Paolo Genovese co-writing and co-directing the short film La scoperta di Walter; the duo made their feature film debut in 2002, with the critical acclaimed comedy film A Neapolitan Spell.

Miniero made his solo-directing debut in 2010, directing the box office hit Benvenuti al Sud.

== Filmography ==
- A Neapolitan Spell (2002, co-directed with Paolo Genovese)
- Sorry, You Can't Get Through! (2005, co-directed with Paolo Genovese)
- Viaggio in Italia - Una favola vera (2007, co-directed with Paolo Genovese) – TV film
- This Night Is Still Ours (2008, co-directed with Paolo Genovese)
- Benvenuti al Sud (2010)
- Benvenuti al Nord (2012)
- A Boss in the Living Room (2014)
- La scuola più bella del mondo (2014)
- Non c'è più religione (2016)
- I'm Back (2018)
- Beware the Gorilla (2019)
- Cops - Una banda di poliziotti – TV series (2020–2021)
- Lolita Lobosco – TV series (2021-ongoing)
- Everyone on Board (2022)
