= Luciano De Crescenzo =

Italian writer (1928–2019)

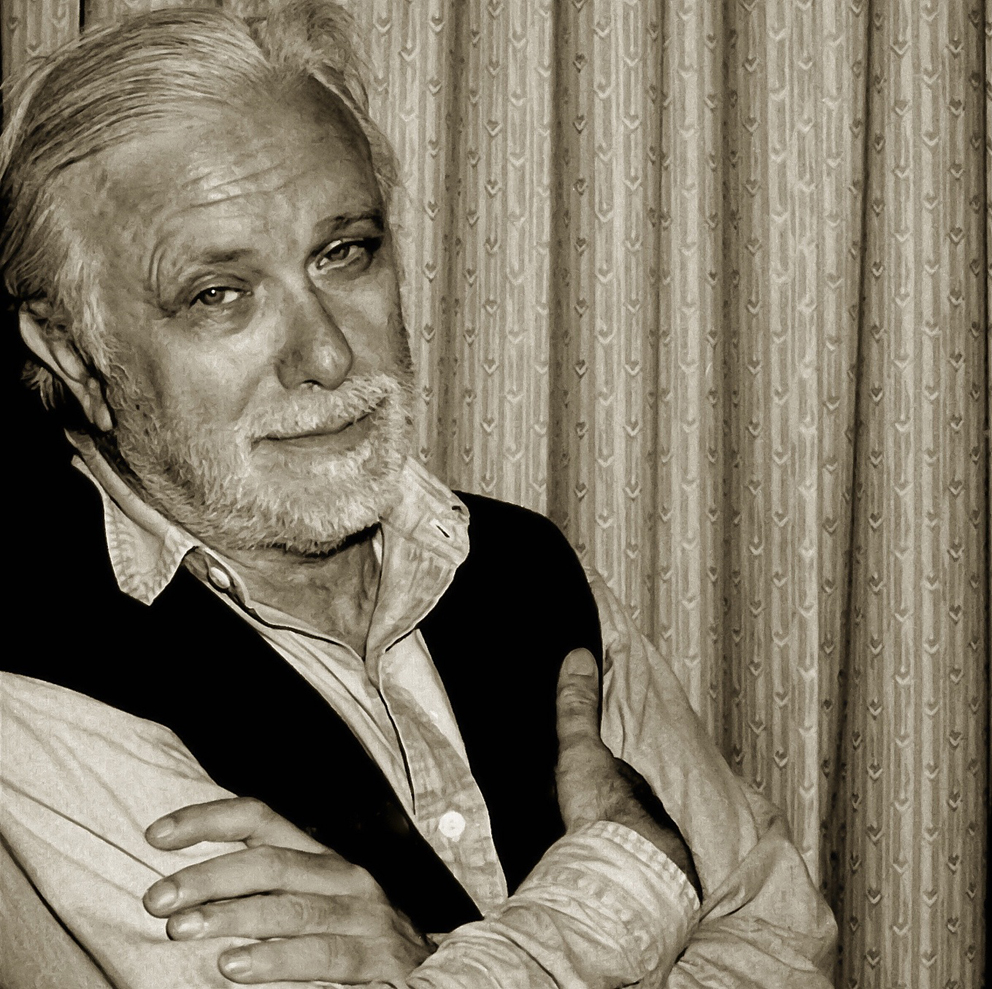
- Luciano De Crescenzo in 1995, photographed by Augusto De Luca
- Born: 18 August 1928; Naples, Kingdom of Italy
- Died: 18 July 2019 (aged 90); Rome, Italy
- Occupations: Writer, film actor, director, engineer
- Height: 1.77 m (5 ft 10 in)

Luciano De Crescenzo (Italian pronunciation: [luˈtʃaːno de kreʃˈʃɛntso]; 18 August 1928 – 18 July 2019) was an Italian writer, film actor, director and engineer.

== Biography ==
Born in Naples, he grew up with actor Bud Spencer. De Crescenzo graduated in engineering and worked for IBM Italy until 1976, when he published the bestseller Così parlò Bellavista (Thus spoke Bellavista), a collection of facts and anecdotes about his city which sold 600,000 copies in Italy and was translated into numerous languages. Over the years De Crescenzo became an internationally successful author. In 1980 he debuted as actor in Il pap'occhio, under the direction of his friend Renzo Arbore, together with Roberto Benigni.

In 1981 he made his TV debut alongside Renzo Arbore and Lory Del Santo in successful and innovative show Tagli, ritagli e frattaglie.

In 1984 he directed the successful movie adaptation of Così parlò Bellavista (in which he also played the protagonist), followed by Il mistero di Bellavista in 1985. In 1995 he wrote and directed Croce e delizia, featuring Teo Teocoli and Isabella Rossellini.

In the meantime he published a long series of books, including novels and popularizations of philosophy. For his work in the field of Greek philosophy he received honorary citizenship of Athens in 1994. Between 1977 and 2019, he published a total of fifty books, selling 18 million copies worldwide, of which 7 million in Italy. His works have been translated into 19 languages and published in 25 countries.

- Così parlò Bellavista (1977)
- Raffaele (1978)
- La Napoli di Bellavista (1979)
- Zio Cardellino (1981)
- Storia della filosofia greca. I presocratici (1983)
- Oi dialogoi (1985)
- Storia della filosofia greca. Da Socrate in poi (1986) – The History of Greek Philosophy: Socrates and Beyond
- Vita di Luciano De Crescenzo scritta da lui medesimo (1989)
- Elena, Elena, amore mio (1991)
- Il dubbio (1992)
- Croce e delizia (1993)
- Socrate (1993)
- I miti degli dei (1993)
- Panta rei (1994)
- Ordine e disordine (1996)
- Nessuno (1997)
- Sembra ieri (1997)
- Il tempo e la felicità (1998)
- Le donne sono diverse (1999)
- La distrazione (2000)
- Tale e quale (2001)
- Storia della filosofia medioevale (2002)
- Storia della filosofia moderna. Da Niccolò Cusano a Galileo Galilei (2003)
- Storia della filosofia moderna. Da Cartesio a Kant (2004)
- I pensieri di Bellavista (2005)
- Il pressappoco (2007)
- Il caffe sospeso. Saggezza quotidiana in piccoli sorsi (2008)
- Ulisse era un Fico (2010)

He was hospitalized in Rome in July 2019. De Crescenzo died several days later on 19 July at the age of 90.

== Bibliography ==
- Tutti santi me compreso, Milano, A. Mondadori, 2011.
- Fosse 'a Madonna!, Milano, A. Mondadori, 2012.
- Garibaldi era comunista, Milano, A. Mondadori, 2013.
- Gesù è nato a Napoli, Milano, A. Mondadori, 2013.
- Ti porterà fortuna. Guida insolita di Napoli, Milano, A. Mondadori, 2014.

== Filmography (director) ==
- Così parlò Bellavista (1984)
- Il mistero di Bellavista (1985)
- 32 dicembre (1987)
- Croce e delizia (1995)
