= List of Italian films of 2001 =

A list of films produced in Italy in 2001 (see 2001 in film):

| Title | Director | Cast | Genre | Notes |
|---|---|---|---|---|
2001
| Aida of the Trees | Guido Manuli | Filippa Giordano | Animation | |
| Bad Women | Fabio Conversi | Giovanna Mezzogiorno, Ángela Molina | drama | |
| Chimera | Pappi Corsicato | Iaia Forte, Franco Nero | romance | |
| The Comeback | Franco Angeli | Francesco Salvi, Nando Gazzolo | drama | |
| Domenica | Wilma Labate | Claudio Amendola, Annabella Sciorra | Drama | |
| E adesso sesso | Carlo Vanzina | Adolfo Margiotta, Luigi Maria Burruano | Comedy | |
| Empty Eyes | Andrea Porporati | Fabrizio Gifuni, Gianni Cavina, Delia Boccardo, Valerio Mastandrea | crime-drama | |
| Gasoline | Monica Stambrini | Maya Sansa, Regina Orioli | Crime | |
| The Ignorant Fairies (Le fate ignoranti) | Ferzan Özpetek | Stefano Accorsi, Margherita Buy, Serra Yilmaz, Gabriel Garko | Gay Drama | 2 Nastro d'Argento |
| Light of My Eyes (Luce dei miei occhi) | Giuseppe Piccioni | Luigi Lo Cascio, Sandra Ceccarelli, Silvio Orlando, Toni Bertorelli | Romance | entered into 58th Venice International Film Festival, 2 Volpi Cups |
| Momo | Enzo D'Alò | Diego Abatantuono, Giancarlo Giannini, Sergio Rubini | Animation | |
| Off to the Revolution by a 2CV | Maurizio Sciarra | Adriano Giannini, Francisco Rabal, Georges Moustaki | Comedy | Golden Leopard winner |
| One Man Up | Paolo Sorrentino | Toni Servillo, Andrea Renzi | Drama | Sorrentino's debut |
| Our Tropical Island | Marcello Cesena | Diego Abatantuono, Victoria Abril | Comedy | |
| Princesa | Henrique Goldman | Ingrid de Souza, Cesare Bocci | Drama | |
| Probably Love | Giuseppe Bertolucci | Sonia Bergamasco, Fabrizio Gifuni | Drama | |
| The Profession of Arms | Ermanno Olmi | Hristo Zhivkov, Sandra Ceccarelli | Historical drama | 9 David di Donatello, 3 Nastro d'Argento, entered into Cannes |
| Red Moon | Antonio Capuano | Carlo Cecchi, Licia Maglietta, Toni Servillo | drama | entered into 58th Venice International Film Festival |
| Resurrection | Paolo and Vittorio Taviani | Stefania Rocca, Marie Bäumer, Marina Vlady, Giulio Scarpati, Antonella Ponziani | drama | Won the Golden St. George at the 24th Moscow International Film Festival |
| Samsara | Pan Nalin | Shawn Ku | drama | |
| Santa Maradona | Marco Ponti | Stefano Accorsi, Libero De Rienzo, Anita Caprioli | Comedy | 2 David di Donatello |
| Sleepless | Dario Argento | Max von Sydow, Chiara Caselli, Stefano Dionisi | Giallo | |
| The Son's Room (La stanza del figlio) | Nanni Moretti | Nanni Moretti, Laura Morante, Stefano Accorsi, Jasmine Trinca, Claudio Santamaria | Drama | Palme d'Or winner at Cannes. 3 David di Donatello |
| South Kensington | Carlo Vanzina | Rupert Everett, Elle Macpherson, Judith Godrèche, Sienna Miller | romantic comedy | |
| Tomorrow | Francesca Archibugi | Marco Baliani, Ornella Muti, Valerio Mastandrea | drama | Screened at the 2001 Cannes Film Festival |
| L'ultimo bacio (The Last Kiss) | Gabriele Muccino | Stefano Accorsi, Giovanna Mezzogiorno, Stefania Sandrelli, Martina Stella, Pierfrancesco Favino, Claudio Santamaria, Sabrina Impacciatore, Giorgio Pasotti, Sergio Castellitto | | 5 David di Donatello, 3 Nastro d'Argento. Remade as American movie The Last Kiss. |
| Unfair Competition | Ettore Scola | Sergio Castellitto, Diego Abatantuono, Gérard Depardieu, Antonella Attili | Drama | Won Best Director at the 23rd Moscow International Film Festival |
| Vajont | Renzo Martinelli | Michel Serrault, Daniel Auteuil, Laura Morante | Drama | |
| Viper | Sergio Citti | Harvey Keitel, Giancarlo Giannini | Drama | |
| Without Filter | Mimmo Raimondi | Articolo 31, Cochi Ponzoni | Drama | |
| The Words of My Father | Francesca Comencini | Fabrizio Rongione, Chiara Mastroianni, Mimmo Calopresti | drama | Screened at the 2001 Cannes Film Festival |

== See also ==
- 2001 in Italy
- 2001 in Italian television
