= 47th David di Donatello =

2002 Italian film awards

- Date: 10 April 2002
- Hosted by: Milly Carlucci; Sergio Castellitto

Highlights
- Best Picture: The Profession of Arms
- Most awards: The Profession of Arms (9)
- Most nominations: The Profession of Arms and Burning in the Wind (9)

Television coverage
- Network: Rai 2

The 47th David di Donatello ceremony, presented by the Accademia del Cinema Italiano, was held on 10 April 2002.

== Winners and nominees ==
Best Film: The Profession of Arms, directed by Ermanno Olmi; Burning in the Wind, directed by Silvio Soldini; Light of My Eyes, directed by Giuseppe Piccioni	Best Producer: Luigi Musini, Roberto Cicutto, Ermanno Olmi – The Profession of Arms; Lionello Cerri, Luigi Musini – Burning in the Wind; Roberto Buttafarro – Santa Maradona
Best Director: Ermanno Olmi – The Profession of Arms; Silvio Soldini – Burning in the Wind; Giuseppe Piccioni – Light of My Eyes	Best New Director: Marco Ponti – Santa Maradona; Vincenzo Marra – Sailing Home; Paolo Sorrentino – One Man Up
Best Actor: Giancarlo Giannini – I Love You Eugenio; Luigi Lo Cascio – Light of My Eyes; Toni Servillo – One Man Up	Best Actress: Marina Confalone – A Neapolitan Spell; Sandra Ceccarelli – Light of My Eyes; Licia Maglietta – Red Moon
Best Supporting Actor: Libero De Rienzo – Santa Maradona; Leo Gullotta – Vajont; Silvio Orlando – Light of My Eyes	Best Supporting Actress: Stefania Sandrelli – Sons and Daughters; Rosalinda Celentano – Probably Love; Iaia Forte – Paz!
David di Donatello for Best Screenplay: Ermanno Olmi – The Profession of Arms; Doriana Leondeff, Silvio Soldini – Burning in the Wind; Paolo Sorrentino – One Man Up	Best Cinematography: Fabio Olmi – The Profession of Arms; Luca Bigazzi – Burning in the Wind; Arnaldo Catinari – Light of My Eyes
Best Production Design: Luigi Marchione – The Profession of Arms; Giancarlo Basili – Paz!; Francesco Frigeri – Vajont	Best Score: Fabio Vacchi – The Profession of Arms; Luciano Ligabue – Da zero a dieci; Giovanni Venosta – Burning in the Wind
Best Editing: Paolo Cottignola – The Profession of Arms; Carlotta Cristiani –Burning in the Wind; Massimo Fiocchi – Amnèsia	Best Sound: Remo Ugolinelli – Light of My Eyes; Gaetano Carito – Da zero a dieci; Tullio Morganti – The Words of My Father
Best Costumes: Francesca Sartori – The Profession of Arms; Nanà Cecchi – The Knights of the Quest; Maria Rita Barbera – Light of My Eyes; Silvia Nebiolo – Burning in the Wind	Best Short Film: Non dire gatto, directed by Giorgio Tirabassi; La storia chiusa, directed by Emiliano Corapi; Un paio di occhiali, directed by Carlo Damasco
Best Foreign Film: The Man Who Wasn't There, directed by Coen brothers; Amélie, directed by Jean-Pierre Jeunet; No Man's Land, directed by Danis Tanović	David Scuola: Vajont, directed by Renzo Martinelli; Special David Awards: Liza Minnelli; Carlo Rambaldi; Franco Zeffirelli
