= 58th Venice International Film Festival =

Italian film festival in 2001

- Festival poster
- Opening film: Dust
- Closing film: That Love
- Location: Venice, Italy
- Founded: 1932
- Awards: Golden Lion: Monsoon Wedding
- Hosted by: Stefania Rocca
- Artistic director: Alberto Barbera
- Festival date: 29 August – 8 September 2001
- Website: Website

Venice Film Festival chronology
- 59th 57th

The 58th annual Venice International Film Festival was held between 29 August to 8 September 2001.

The opening night film was Dust by Milcho Manchevski. Italian filmmaker Nanni Moretti was the Jury President of the main competition. Mira Nair's Monsoon Wedding was the Golden Lion winner.

== Jury ==
The following people comprised the 2001 jury:

=== Main Competition ===
- Nanni Moretti, Italian director and actor - Jury President
- Jeanne Balibar, French actress and singer
- Amitav Ghosh, Indian author
- Taylor Hackford, American director
- Cecilia Roth, Argentine actress
- Jerzy Skolimowski, Polish director and actor
- Vibeke Windeløv, Danish producer

=== Luigi De Laurentiis Award for a Debut Feature ===
- Francesco Casetti, Italian film theorist
- Cédric Kahn, French director
- Jafar Panahi, Iranian director
- Jean-Loup Passek, French film critic
- Ruth Vitale, American producer

=== Cinema of the Present (Cinema del presente) ===
- Michel Ciment, French film critic
- Piera Detassis, Italian film critic
- Shigehiko Hasumi, Japanese film critic
- Emanuel Levy, American film critic
- Gavin Smith, American film studio executive

=== Short Films Competition ===
- Francesca Comencini, Italian director
- Jacques Kermabon, French film critic
- Mario Micaelo, Portuguese founder of the Vila do Conde International Short Film Festival

== Official Section ==
The following films were selected to be screened:

=== In Competition ===
English title	Original title	Director(s)	Production country
Address Unknown	수취인불명	Ki-duk Kim	South Korea
The Afternoon of a Torturer	După-amiaza unui torționar	Lucian Pintilie	Romania
Behind the Sun	Abril Despedaçado	Walter Salles	Brazil, France, Switzerland
Bully		Larry Clark	United States
Dog Days	Hundstage	Ulrich Seidl	Austria
Eden		Amos Gitai	Italy, Israel, France
Hollywood Hong Kong	香港有個荷里活	Fruit Chan	Hong Kong
How Harry Became a Tree		Goran Paskaljević	Italy, France, United Kingdom, Ireland
Light of My Eyes	Luce dei miei occhi	Giuseppe Piccioni	Italy
Far	Loin	André Téchiné	France
Monsoon Wedding		Mira Nair	India, United States, Italy, Germany, France, United Kingdom
The Navigators		Ken Loach	United Kingdom, Germany, Spain
The Others	Los otros	Alejandro Amenábar	Spain, United States
Red Moon	Luna rossa	Antonio Capuano	Italy
Secret Ballot	رأی مخفی	Babak Payami	Iran, Italy, Canada, Switzerland
Triumph of Love		Clare Peploe	Italy, United Kingdom, Germany
Waking Life		Richard Linklater	United States
Who Are You?	Quem És Tu?	João Botelho	Portugal
Wild Innocence	Sauvage innocence	Philippe Garrel	France
Y tu mamá también		Alfonso Cuarón	Mexico

=== Out of Competition ===
English title	Original title	Director(s)	Production country
Atraksion		Raoul Servais	Belgium
That Love (closing film)	Cet amour-là	Josée Dayan	France
Dust (opening film)		Milcho Manchevski	Macedonia, United Kingdom, Italy, Germany
The Lady and the Duke	L’Anglaise et le Duc	Eric Rohmer	France
Pistol Opera	ピストルオペラ	Seijun Suzuki	Japan
Porto of My Childhood	Porto da Minha Infancia	Manoel de Oliveira	Portugal, France
Silence, We're Rolling	Silence... on tourne	Youssef Chahine	France, Egypt
Tuesday		Geoff Dunbar	United Kingdom

=== Cinema of the Present (Cinema del presente) ===
English title	Original title	Director(s)	Production country
L'amore imperfetto		Giovanni Maderna	Italy, Spain
Deep Breath	Le souffle	Damien Odoul	France
Loco Fever	La Fiebre del Loco	Andrés Wood	Chile
Fifi Martingale		Jacques Rozier	France
Flower Island	꽃섬	Song Il-gon	South Korea
Harmful Insect	害虫	Akihiko Shiota	Japan
A Hell of a Day	Reines d'un jour	Marion Vernoux	France
Invincible		Werner Herzog	Germany, United Kingdom
Larger Than Life	Tuhog	Jeffrey Jeturian	Philippines
Me Without You		Sandra Goldbacher	United Kingdom
One Man Up	L'uomo in più	Paolo Sorrentino	Italy
Probably Love	L'amore probabilmente	Giuseppe Bertolucci	Italy
Quitting	昨天	Zhang Yang	China
Saturday	Sábado	Juan Villegas	Argentina
Sisters	Сёстры	Sergei Bodrov Jr.	Russia
Sons and Daughters	Figli/Hijos	Marco Bechis	Argentina, Italy
Thirteen Conversations About One Thing		Jill Sprecher	United States
Time Out	L'Emploi du temps	Laurent Cantet	Japan
Tirana Year Zero	Tirana, année zéro	Fatmir Koçi	Albania, France, Belgium
Water and Salt	Água e Sal	Teresa Villaverde	Portugal, Italy

== Independent Sections ==
=== Venice International Film Critics' Week ===
The following feature films were selected to be screened as In Competition for this section:

English title	Original title	Director(s)	Production country
An Adolescent	Shōjo	Eiji Okuda	Japan
Brother	Gege	Yan Yan Mak	Hong Kong
A Moment of Happiness	Un moment de bonheur	Antoine Santana	France
Rain		Katherine Lindberg	United States
Rasganço		Raquel Freire	Portugal, France
Sailing Home	Tornando a casa	Vincenzo Marra	Italy
Smokers Only	Vagón fumador	Verónica Chen	Argentina

== Official Awards ==
=== Main Competition ===
- Golden Lion: Monsoon Wedding by Mira Nair
- Grand Special Jury Prize: Dog Days by Ulrich Seidl
- Silver Lion: Secret Ballot by Babak Payami
- Volpi Cup for Best Actor: Luigi Lo Cascio for Light of My Eyes
- Volpi Cup for Best Actress: Sandra Ceccarelli for Light of My Eyes
- Marcello Mastroianni Award: Gael García Bernal and Diego Luna for Y tu mamá también

=== Luigi De Laurentis Award for Debut Feature ===
- Bread and Milk for Jan Cvitkovic and Danijel Hocevar

== Independent Awards ==
=== Cinema of the Present - Lion of the Year ===
- Seafood by Zhu Wen
- Special Jury Award: Deep Breath by Damien Odoul

=== FIPRESCI Prize ===
- Competition: Wild Innocence by Philippe Garrel
- Parallel Sections: Deep Breath by Damien Odoul

=== OCIC Award ===
- Secret Ballot by Babak Payami

=== Netpac Award ===
- Secret Ballot by Babak Payami
- Quitting by Yang Zhang

=== Don Quixote Award ===
- L'emploi du temps by Laurent Cantet

=== UNICEF Award ===
- Secret Ballot by Babak Payami

=== UNESCO Award ===
- Porto of My Childhood by Manoel de Oliveira

=== Pasinetti Award ===
- Best Film: Secret Ballot by Babak Payami
- Best Actor: Luigi Lo Cascio for Light of My Eyes
- Best Actress: Sandra Ceccarelli for Light of My Eyes

=== Italian Cinema Clubs Awards ===
- Sailing Home for Vincenzo Marra

=== Pietro Bianchi Award ===
- Alberto Sordi

=== Isvema Award ===
- Sailing Home by Vincenzo Marra

=== FEDIC Award ===
- Sailing Home by Vincenzo Marra

=== Wella Prize ===
- Red Moon by Licia Maglietta

=== Elvira Notari Prize ===
- Fish and Elephant by Yu Li

=== Cult Network Italia Prize ===
- Sailing Home by Vincenzo Marra

=== FilmCritica "Bastone Bianco" Award ===
- Dias de Nietzsche em Turim by Júlio Bressane

=== Future Film Festival Digital Award ===
- A.I. Artificial Intelligence by Steven Spielberg

=== Laterna Magica Prize ===
- Monsoon Wedding by Mira Nair

=== Sergio Trasatti Award ===
- Light of My Eyes by Giuseppe Piccioni

=== CinemAvvenire Award ===
- Best Film on the Relationship Man-Nature: Sailing Home by Vincenzo Marra
- Best Film: Waking Life by Richard Linklater
- Best First Film: Flower Island by Il-gon Song

=== Children and Cinema Award ===
- The Navigators by Ken Loach

=== Rota Soundtrack Award ===
- George Fenton for The Navigators

=== Mimmo Rotella Foundation Award ===
- Who Are You? by João Botelho
  - Special Director's Award: Babak Payami
  - Best Screenplay: Alfonso Cuarón and Carlos Cuarón for Y tu mamá también
