= Quitting =

2001 film directed by Zhang Yang

- North American DVD cover
- Directed by: Zhang Yang
- Written by: Zhang Yang; Huo Xin
- Produced by: Peter Loehr; Imar Film
- Starring: Jia Hongsheng; Jia Fengsen; Chai Xiuling
- Cinematography: Wang Yu; Cheng Shouqi
- Edited by: Yang Hongyu
- Music by: Zhang Yadong
- Distributed by: Sony Pictures Classics (United States)
- Release date: 4 September 2001 (Venice)
- Running time: 112 minutes
- Country: China
- Language: Mandarin Chinese
- Box office: $25,717

Quitting (Chinese: 昨天; lit. 'Yesterday') is a 2001 Chinese drama film directed by Zhang Yang, starring and based on the true life story of Jia Hongsheng. Jia, an actor and former drug addict, battled his addiction to marijuana and heroin for five years from 1992 to 1997. All members of the cast, from Jia and Jia's family members right down to the doctors and patients at a mental institute Jia was admitted to, are real people playing themselves. The film premiered at the Venice Film Festival on 4 September 2001 and clinched the NETPAC Award.

The original Chinese title is an allusion to the Beatles' 1965 classic song "Yesterday". References to The Beatles, of whom Jia was an avid fan, are also made throughout the film. Besides dressing up like John Lennon, Jia also fantasized himself as Lennon's son and recited the Chinese translation of the lyrics to "Let It Be" religiously. However, Michael Jackson, who owned the rights to most Beatles songs, declined to give permission for the song or its title to be used in the film. Instead, the film uses songs by Chinese rockers such as Cui Jian, Tang Dynasty and Dou Wei.

== Plot ==
Jia Hongsheng, graduated from the Central Academy of Drama in Beijing in 1989, gains fame in the late 80s and early 90s as an actor in films such as The Case of the Silver Snake and A Woman from North Shaanxi. During rehearsal for a stage production of Kiss of the Spider Woman (also directed by Zhang Yang) in the fall of 1992, Jia first comes into contact with marijuana and subsequently becomes addicted and even experiments occasionally with heroin. In 1995, after filming Weekend Lover, Jia quits acting completely and lives off his younger sister Wang Tong. An avid fan of The Beatles, Jia listens to their music obsessively and begins to imagine himself as the son of John Lennon.

In late 1995, Jia's parents Jia Fengsen and Chai Xiuling, both theatre actors from Northeastern China, decide to move to Beijing to help their son to quit drugs. Wang Tong, who had previous moved out, also comes back to live with her parents and brother in the same apartment. Initial efforts by the aged parents to penetrate their son's inner world are met with indifference, sometimes even hostility. Over time, however, Jia begins to open up gradually. He begins to take regular walks with his father, usually buying a bottle or two of beer along the way. Jia Fengsen also buys his son cassette tapes by The Beatles, as requested by the latter.

In early 1996, however, Jia Hongsheng relapses after staying off drugs for almost half a year. On 19 March 1996, after drinking many bottles of beer in celebration of his twenty-ninth birthday, Jia slaps his father, claiming to teach the latter the "meaning of life". Jia's family subsequently contacts the police. Three policemen come the next day and bring Jia to a mental institution.

While at the mental institution, Jia is put under medication and his condition improves significantly. More importantly, he has stopped fantasizing and begins to see himself as just an ordinary human being. The doctor subsequently determines that Jia is not suffering from schizophrenia but recommends that Jia stays in the institution for a longer time to completely quit drugs. On 19 March 1997, on his thirtieth birthday, Jia is finally discharged.

== Cast ==
- Jia Hongsheng as himself, an actor who battled his drug addiction from 1992 to 1997.
- Jia Fengsen as himself, a retired theatre actor from Northeastern China, father of Jia Hongsheng.
- Chai Xiuling as herself, a retired theatre actress from Northeastern China, mother of Jia Hongsheng.
- Wang Tong as herself, younger sister of Jia Hongsheng.

== Reception ==
Quitting premiered at the 58th Venice International Film Festival on 4 September 2001 and clinched the NETPAC Award (tied with Iranian film Raye makhfi, by Babak Payami). The film opened in the United States on 13 September 2002, distributed by Sony Pictures Classics. When it closed on 17 October 2002, it grossed a meager US$18,531 in box office.

American film critic Roger Ebert gave Quitting a two and half stars rating; saying the movie is not so much about drug addiction as it is about "sentimentalized Chinese ideals of drug addiction." He called it a "brave experiment, based on life and using actors to play themselves, but it buys into the whole false notion that artists are too brilliant to be sober––that drugs and booze are almost necessary to tame their creativity, dull their pain, and allow them to tolerate life[...] Thus the 'cure' is not so much to stop using as it is to stop dreaming; one must become boring to become clean and sober."

=== Awards and nominations ===
- Venice Film Festival (see 2001 in film)
  - NETPAC Award (tied with Raye makhfi)
- Bangkok International Film Festival, 2001
  - Best Film
- Stockholm Film Festival, 2001
  - FIPRESCI Prize
  - Bronze Horse Award (nominated)
- Singapore International Film Festival (see 2002 in film)
  - Silver Screen Award for Best Actor — Jia Hongsheng
  - Silver Screen Award for Best Asian Feature Film (nominated)

== DVD release ==
Quitting was released on DVD and distributed in the United States by Sony Pictures Classics on 4 March 2003. The DVD release features original dialogue with subtitles in English and Spanish.
