= Deep Breath =

Deep Breath may refer to:

- Deep Breath (2001 film), a French drama film
- Deep Breath (2003 film), an Iranian film
- "Deep Breath" (Doctor Who), an episode of Doctor Who
