= Christo Jivkov =

Bulgarian actor (1975–2023)

- Христо Живков
- Born: 18 February 1975; Sofia, Bulgaria
- Died: 31 March 2023 (aged 48); Los Angeles, California, U.S.
- Occupations: Actor; filmmaker
- Years active: 2001–2019

Christo Jivkov (Note: His name is also sometimes transliterated as Hristo Zhivkov.) (Bulgarian: Христо Живков; 18 February 1975 – 31 March 2023) was a Bulgarian actor. He first gained recognition for portraying Giovanni delle Bande Nere in the period drama The Profession of Arms (2001), and later became better known for his leading role as St. John in Mel Gibson's The Passion of the Christ (2004).

Jivkov also appeared in numerous Italian films and television shows, including The Good War (2002), Eyes of Crystal (2004), The Inquiry (2006), The Lark Farm (2007), David's Birthday, Barbarossa (both 2009), The Invisible Boy (2014) and Lucania (2019).

== Life and career ==
Jivkov was born 18 February 1975 in Sofia, Bulgaria. Shortly after graduating from the National Academy for Theatre and Film Arts where he majored in film directing, he was cast in the role of Giovanni de Medici in Ermanno Olmi's 2001 film The Profession of Arms, which won nine awards at the 2002 David di Donatello Awards, including Best Film. In 2003, Jivkov starred in Mel Gibson's The Passion of the Christ alongside Jim Caviezel and Monica Bellucci. The film achieved success at the box office, grossing $612 million worldwide.

Jivkov was the co-founder of the Bulgarian production company Red Carpet Films.

== Death ==
Jivkov died from pancreatic cancer on 31 March 2023, at the age of 48, in Los Angeles. Tributes were paid by his friends and colleagues Mel Gibson, Maria Grazia Cucinotta and Dessy Tenekedjieva, among others.

== Filmography ==
=== Film ===
| Year | Title | Role | Notes |
|---|---|---|---|
| 2001 | The Profession of Arms | Giovanni de Medici | |
| 2002 | The Good War | Gartner's son | |
| 2004 | The Passion of the Christ | St. John | |
| 2004 | Eyes of Crystal | Detective Di Fusco | |
| 2006 | The Inquiry | Stephen | |
| 2007 | The Lark Farm | Sarkis | |
| 2009 | David's Birthday | Leonard | |
| 2009 | Barbarossa | Gherardo Negro | |
| 2014 | The Invisible Boy | Andreij | |
| 2019 | Lucania | Christo | |

=== Television ===
| Year | Title | Role | Notes |
|---|---|---|---|
| 1996 | I ragazzi del muretto | Student | Episode: A scuola d'amore |
| 2016 | VIP Brother | Himself | Season 8 |

=== As filmmaker ===
- Druids (2001), assistant director
- The Profit (2001), assistant director
- Julius Caesar (2003), assistant director
- Tears of the Motherland (2007), associate producer
- Holy Light (2010), producer
- Black & White in Color (2012), associate producer
- Alienation (2013), executive producer
