= Francesco Tullio Altan =

Italian comics artist and satirist (born 1942)

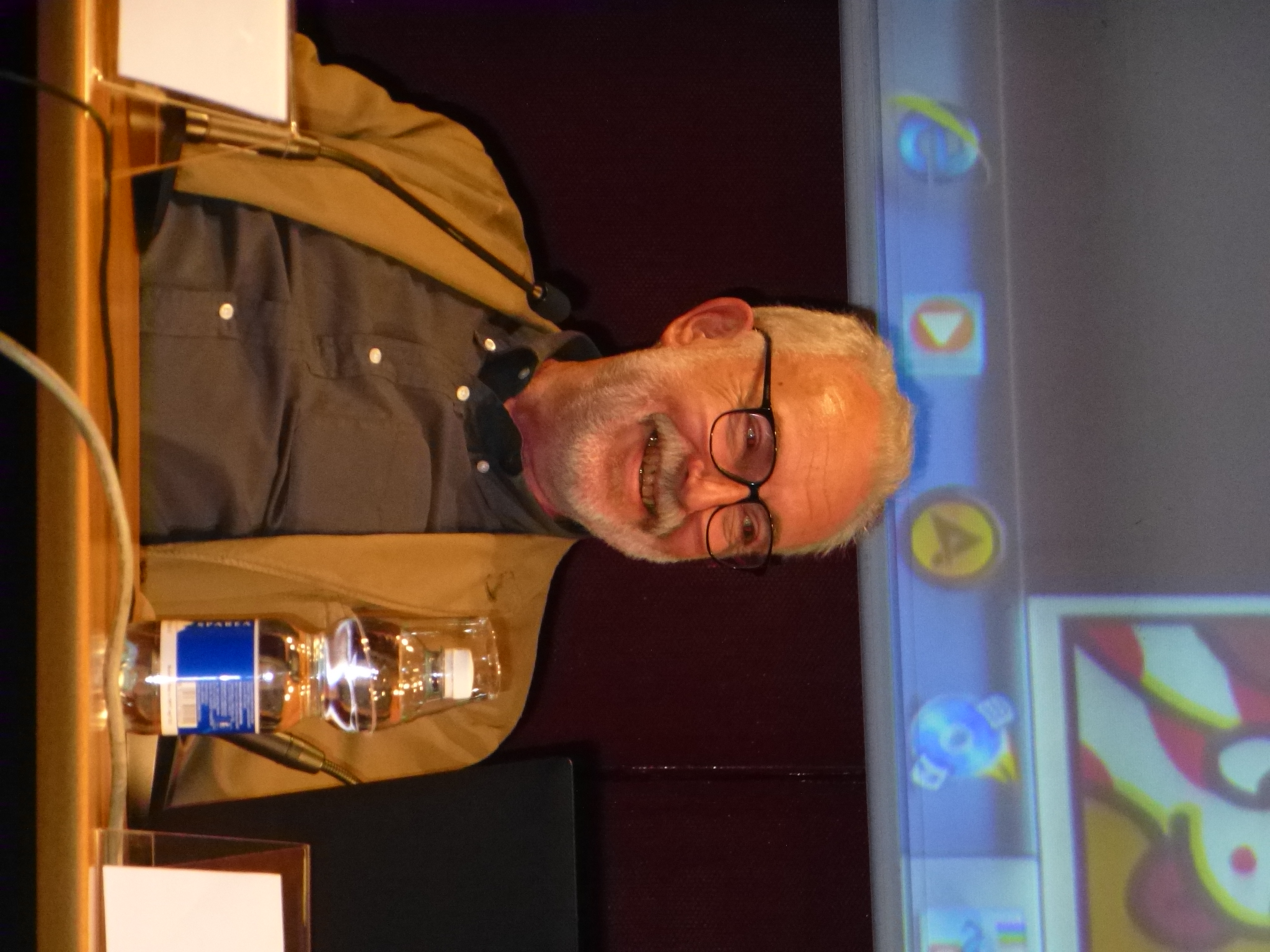
- Francesco Tullio Altan
- Born: 30 September 1942 (age 83) Treviso, Italy
- Occupation: Comics artist and satirist
- Notable awards: U Giancu's Prize, 1993

Francesco Tullio Altan (born 30 September 1942) is an Italian comics artist and satirist.

He was born in Treviso, the son of Friulan anthropologist Carlo Tullio Altan. He studied at the University IUAV of Venice, but halted his studies to work for cinema and TV as a scenographer and writer. In 1970 he moved to Rio de Janeiro, where he created his first comics series for children, published in a local newspaper. In 1974 he began collaborating with Italian publishers.

In 1974, for the comics magazine Linus, he created Trino, an unprepared god who has to create the world. In 1975, the year he returned to Italy, Altan created one of his most famous characters, Pimpa, initially published in Corriere dei Piccoli. Pimpa, a female puppy with red polka dots, later became a cartoon for Italian television, under the direction of Enzo D'Alò.

His other characters for adult readers include Cipputi, a communist industrial worker who was the subject of numerous daily panels for newspapers such as L'Unità and La Repubblica, Christopher Columbus, Casanova and Franz (a parody of St. Francis of Assisi). Altan's satirical panels were also published in magazines such as Panorama and, more recently, L'Espresso.
