= Eyes of Crystal =

- Directed by: Eros Puglielli
- Written by: Gabriella Blasi; Luca Di Fulvio; Franco Ferrini; Eros Puglielli
- Starring: Luigi Lo Cascio; Lucía Jiménez
- Cinematography: Luca Coassin
- Release date: 10 September 2004 (VFF)
- Running time: 1h 47min
- Countries: Italy; Spain; United Kingdom; Bulgaria

Eyes of Crystal (Italian: Occhi di cristallo) is a 2004 international co-production thriller film directed by Eros Puglielli.

== Plot ==
Police inspector Amaldi (played by Luigi Lo Cascio) must hunt down a sadistic serial killer.

== Cast ==
- Luigi Lo Cascio as Inspector Giacomo Amaldi
- Lucía Jiménez as Giuditta
- José Ángel Egido as Frese
- Simón Andreu as Detective Ajaccio
- Carmelo Gómez as Professor Avildsen
- Eusebio Poncela as Dr. Civita
- Branimir Miladinov as Avildsen As A Child
- Tzvetan Philipov as Ajaccio As A Child
- Ernestina Chinova as Dr. Cerusico
- Hristo Zhivkov as Detective Di Fusco
- Dessy Tenekedjieva as Lucia
