= Payami =

Payami may refer to:

- Babak Payami, Iranian film director
- Ali Payami, Swedish-Iranian music producer
