= Michael Galasso =

American composer, violinist, and music director

- Birth name: Michael John Galasso
- Born: 1949 Hammond, Louisiana, U.S.
- Died: September 9, 2009 (aged 59–60) Paris, France
- Occupation: Composer

Michael John Galasso (1949, Hammond, Louisiana - September 9, 2009, Paris, France) was an American composer, violinist, and music director.

== Film scores ==
Galasso wrote music for films, including Wong Kar-wai's In the Mood for Love, Babak Payami's Secret Ballot, Yeşim Ustaoğlu's Waiting for the Clouds and Derviş Zaim's Mud. Three of his songs, "Scene I", "Scene VI", "Scene VII", appeared in the 1986 romantic comedy My Chauffeur, starring Deborah Foreman and Sam J. Jones. In 2009 he won the César Award for Best Music Written for a Film for his score for Séraphine, directed by Martin Provost.

== Theatre work ==
Galasso began his career writing music for theatrical productions, most notably for a number of early works of Robert Wilson including "Ouverture"(1972), "The Life and Times of Joseph Stalin" (1973), "A Letter for Queen Victoria" (1974-5), and "The $ Value of Man" (1975). More recently he collaborated with Wilson on Ibsen's "Lady from the Sea" (1998), Strindberg's "A Dreamplay" (1998), “Les Fables de La Fontaine”(2004), “2 Lips and Dancers in Space” (2004) “Peer Gynt” (2005) and “Quartett” (2009).

== Sound installations ==
He also made numerous sound installations, including the Giorgio Armani Retrospective at the Guggenheim Museum in New York in 2000 (the first sound installation in the New York Guggenheim's history) and the Guggenheim Bilbao in 2001.

== Discography ==
- Scenes (ECM, 1984)
- Scan Lines (Igloo, 1985
- Stabat / Waltz in a Minor Key / La Bayadere (Self-released cassette, 1991)
- High Lines (ECM, 2005)
