= Barbarossa (film) =

- Directed by: Renzo Martinelli
- Screenplay by: Renzo Martinelli; Giorgio Schottler; Anna Samueli
- Story by: Renzo Martinelli; Giorgio Schottler
- Produced by: Renzo Martinelli; Vlad Păunescu; Riccardo Pintus
- Starring: Rutger Hauer; F. Murray Abraham; Raz Degan
- Cinematography: Fabio Cianchetti
- Edited by: Osvaldo Bargero
- Music by: Pivio and Aldo De Scalzi
- Production company: Martinelli Film Company International
- Distributed by: 01 Distribuzione
- Release dates: 2 October 2009 (Milan premiere); 9 October 2009 (Italy)
- Running time: 139 minutes
- Country: Italy
- Language: English
- Budget: €9,000,000
- Box office: €835,469

Barbarossa (also released as Barbarossa: Siege Lord or Sword of War) is a 2009 Italian English-language epic historical drama film set primarily in northern Italy during the late 12th century. Despite the film's title, Friedrich "Barbarossa" features only as a supporting character in this film, which is primarily concerned with the struggle of the Lombard League, which struggled to maintain independence from the Holy Roman Empire, led by the legendary Guelph warrior Alberto da Giussano.

This film was co-written and directed by Renzo Martinelli. It has been released on DVD in the United States under the title Sword of War, and elsewhere under the title Barbarossa: Siege Lord.

== Plot ==
"Italy. 12th century AD. Northern Italy is ruled over by a German Emperor: Frederick I Hohenstaufen, known as 'Barbarossa'. His dream is to conquer also Central and Southern Italy, thus reviving the ancient empire founded by Charlemagne. But in the North a young man from Milan has formed an army of 900 young men from different cities: the 'Company of Death'. This young man's name is Alberto Giussano. His dream is to defeat the Emperor and to regain freedom for the Northern lands."

The Emperor Barbarossa is out hunting when he is attacked by a wild boar, but is saved by a young boy. Rather, he is the boy's Emperor, Frederick Hohenstaufen, better known as Barbarossa. With this the boy introduces himself as Alberto da Giussano, son of Giovanni; the grateful emperor gives Alberto his imperial dagger inscribed with his name.

A few years later, in the German city of Würzburg, Barbarossa is going to see Hildegard von Bingen, the great seër. He plans to marry for the second time. The seër says that the wedding is blessed. Then she says Frederick of Swabia's name will be remembered for centuries, but to beware of the scythe which will bring defeat and water for it will bring his death.

At the wedding, Henry, Duke of Saxony, is marrying a young French girl.

The story cuts to Milan where Evandro calls over to the now grown Alberto and tells him to get onto his cart because they must reach the river before dawn. They reach the river and start to load their goods onto a boat there. Lodigiani soldiers arrive and say the merchants crossed through their territory in the night and now they must pay their dues. Evandro pulls a knife and slits the throat of the soldier next to him then Alberto and his companions slay the other soldiers but Alberto is injured during the fighting. His horse brings him back home where two beautiful women, the blonde Tessa and her brunette sister, sister Eleonora. The brunette kisses Alberto's face while he is still unconscious.

Two emissaries from Lodi come to Barbarossa to tell him that the city of Milan is trying to dominate them. Lodi has always been loyal to the Emperor and now they ask him for his help. Barbarossa says he doesn't want to use any force right now on Milan. He says he will write a letter to Milan and the two emissaries will take it to them.

A German emissary delivers the letter to Milan. He says that he comes in the name of the Emperor. Milan is warned not to attack Lodi on pain of being banished from the Empire. A cleric named Gerado throws the letter on the ground and steps on it. Gerado's colleague, Siniscalco Barozzi is shocked at the behaviour of his friend and he asks the German emissary not to leave. Alberto is also shocked and asks Gerado what is he going to do now. Gerado says he will gather the army and attack Lodi.

Alberto has a nightmare and awakens in fright from his deep sleep. His two brothers tell him that Lodi has been defeated.

Barbarossa is furious that Milan attacked Lodi, but he really has no desire to fight. He says it's as if Milan were trying to force him into fighting them. But Barbarossa's charismatic and supportive new queen wants him to go to Milan and destroy that city. Barbarossa sets out for Milan.

Tessa, Eleanora and father have dinner when Siniscalco Barozzi arrives, asking the father for the hand of his daughter Tessa. Tessa's Father says that Tessa would make a good wife and he will put in a good word for him with her. Eleonora comes to tell Alberto that Siniscalco Barozzi wants to marry Tessa but she says that will never happen. Alberto says that they say she is a witch and jokes that maybe that is how she knows Tessa's future. Eleanora is hurt and angry by the accusation so to pacify her, Alberto he shows her the large knife given to him by Barbarossa himself. Eleonora touches it and sees a vision of fighting. She recoils from the knife then she runs from the house.

Tessa tells Eleonora that Ranero, one of Alberto's brothers, says he wants to marry her and she returns his feelings.

Siniscalco Barozzi reaches the camp of Barbarossa but The Emperor is not there so the scheming and cowardly Barozzi tells the substitute Rinaldo di Dassel that he has brought Milan's oath of allegiance to Barbarossa. Rinaldo takes the money, but says that Barbarossa is still coming to attack Milan.

Barozzi returns to Milan to warn of the great size of the German army. In addition, they have a great many war machines. Barozzi implores the people to surrender Milan but they decide to fight, to Barozzi's irritation.

In Verona at the Adige River, a new bridge has been built to the satisfaction of the Germans. They start crossing the bridge, but soon heavy log rams are sent down the river to knock the bridge into sections. German horses and soldiers are tossed into the Adige River. For Verona siding with Milan and killing many German soldiers, Barbarossa cuts off the ear of one of the Verona emissaries.

Eleonora runs to tell Alberto that the Germans have destroyed the city of Brescia with more than one thousand dead. Alberto says they are still going to fight to save Milan. Eleonora thinks the battle has already been lost. As Soldiers from the cities of Parma, Cremona, Padua and Ferrara are sent to join forces with Barbarossa, the Germans are approach Milan. The bells are rung and the people come into the fort.

There is a moat around the fortified walls of the city. The Germans come forward to the moat behind moveable wooden walls. They start pushing giant kegs into the moat water. The Milanese crossbowmen try to kill the men working on the kegs, but the German have hundreds of crossbowmen firing arrows into the Milanese crossbowmen too. The Germans start attacking Milanese walls using their Trebuchets and the Milanese buildings inside. The Milanese try to match fire with fire using their Mangonel aimed at the keg bearers.

Barozzi asks for volunteers to go out and collect food for the people inside the walls. Alberto raises his hand to volunteer, but Barozzi chooses his brother Ranero instead, who did not raise his hand to volunteer. Alberto tells Barozzi to leave his brother alone so Barozzi says then Alberto will go instead of Ranero. Shamed into volunteering, Ranero says he is going for he wants no man to say that he lacks courage. Barozzi wants Ranero to go to battle and die so he can have Tessa all to himself but Tessa, disgusted by Barozzi's cynical manipulations, tells him that if Ranero does not return, she would rather die than be with him.

The Germans then push their siege towers toward the walls of Milan. On the front of the towers they have tied the Millanese volunteers that went out in the fields to get fresh food for the residents of Milan. Orders are given not to shoot but Barozzi grabs a crossbow and shoots Ranero dead. Now others start shooting and most of the volunteers are killed.

At night Alberto goes out and up to retrieve the bodies of his two brothers and swears vengeance for their deaths to his father. Eleonora tries to talk him out of going but he will not hear of it.

Alberto slits the tent of Barbarossa and slips in, only to be confronted by Barbarossa who asks where he got his knife and Alberto says some time ago Barbarossa himself gave the knife to him. Out of gratitude for saving his life, Barbarossa lets Alberto go. As Alberto prepares to slip out of the German camp he sees Barozzi come into the camp.

Alberto returns to his father, but now the Germans are pouring through the gates, led by Barozzi whom Alberto wants to kill but he is captured before he can.

Alberto and all the other prisoners are brought before the Emperor, who burns the Milanese flag. He then says that all of Milan will be razed to the ground and all the Milanese must leave the area before sunset.

In Rome Barbarossa chooses the new Pope and now the Pope crowns he and his wife the Emperor and Empress of the Holy Roman Empire, respectively. As the Emperor and Empress leave the coronations, a man falls dead in front of them. The Empress demands to know what happened to the man. A man looks the body over and says the man died of the plague. Barbarossa and his new Queen make plans to flee.

At the Pontida Monastery, men from Milan hold a meeting together in secret. The men are very pessimistic about their chances of ever defeating Barbarossa and rebuilding Milan. Alberto and his friend burst into the meeting and Alberto shouts that they can defeat Barbarossa if they can just stay united and that this time all the cities of Lombardy will unite against the Germans.

Alberto comes to see Eleonora at her father's house. Her asks her where Tessa is and Eleonora tells him she is dead when in fact Tessa has retired to a nunnery following the death of Ranero. Alberto plans to take Eleonora with him this time but Eleonora resists the idea saying that Alberto always treated her just like everyone else. Alberto apologizes to her.

Alberto and Eleonora come to visit with Eleonora's sister-in-law when Barozzi and the imperial German soldiers arrive to collect the Emperor's share of the local harvest.

Alberto tells Eleonora that the Germans treat them like animals and says that it is time to stop running and form an army.

In Rome Barbarossa's men want to leave the plague infested city. His wife wants him to stay put, but Barbarossa sides with his men and says they are going home.

Alberto tells his men that they will become the "Company of Death" and their motto shall be "Death or freedom". Alberto and his men start rallying volunteers, soon gathering a large force of Lombard men. Eleonora goes to see Tessa in the nunnery. She tells Tessa of the rise of the power of the Lombard League and Tessa tells Eleonora to marry Alberto. Alberto again asks Eleonora again to marry him and this time she agrees however soon after, Barozzi comes to the nunnery to take the Emperor's share of their bounty and to abduct attractive nuns. As Barozzi pulls off the veils of the nuns, he finds Tessa among them. He is ecstatic to find her but Tessa, aware that Barozzi killed her fiancé slashes his face with a dagger and runs to the roof of the nunnery. There she stands on the ledge threatening to plunge to her death. Barozzi begs her not to do it, promising to change his dishonest ways but Tessa fulfils her vow and throws herself to her death rather than be forced to marry him. Far away, her sister senses the death of Tessa and weeps for her.

Barozzi and Eleonora are at the funeral. Eleanora approaches Barozzi and he tearfully tells her that he loved Tessa. Blaming Barozzi for Tessa's suicide, Eleonora is unforgiving and slashes Barozzi's throat, non-fatally wounding him.

News comes to Alberto that Eleonora almost killed Barozzi who has taken Eleonora to the camp of Barbarossa at Alessandria. There they plan to burn her at the stake. Alberto is enraged upon hearing the news.

The Empress is frightened by rumours that Eleanora is a witch while Barbarossa is upset because they have been trying for weeks to take the city without success. He tells his staff to double the digging of the tunnel. His staff tell him that the frequent rains have slowed the digging and the rivers around the city are filled up with water; if the rains continue the rivers will overflow and the whole camp will be submerged. In addition, the rain and mud are destroying the morale of the troops.

The Empress goes to see Eleanora. She sees her right arm has been burned and asks what happened. Eleanora tells her that it is scarring from a lightning strike. The Empress is amazed. Eleonora's cellmate screams that the woman is a witch and she runs to the cell door banging hard on it to be let out. The Empress leaves the cell still wondering how the woman survived.

The tunnel is discovered when there is a cave in opening up a large hole to the sky. When Barbarossa learns of this, he orders that the war machines all be set on fire. They are retreating. Barbarossa says they will retreat to Pavia in Lombardy. His wife advises him to send a message to his cousin Henry the Lion to bring fresh troops for the German army to which Barbarossa agrees but the Empress has an additional request; to free Eleanora because she believes Eleanora is protected by God but Barbarossa refuses.

At the Mera River, Emperor Barbarossa and his troops arrive and Barbarossa asks his cousin Henry the Lion when he is going to give the army he promised him. Henry says that war is no longer a luxury that he can afford and he has no soldiers to give to Frederick, but he does have a small chest filled with coins with which Frederick can buy fresh troops. Possessed of great wealth already, Frederick growls that Henry is "useless" and leaves him behind.

Barozzi arrives late to Eleanora's burning but a masked woman is on the pyre which is set alight. He does not see her face but is told that she is Eleanora.

Alberto and the men of the Company of Death prepare to attack the forces of Barbarossa and beforehand Alberto gives his men a speech about fighting for their freedom.

In Legnano, to the North of Milan, The German army faces what they think is only the Milanese army. They are roughly two miles away on the plain and Barbarossa is sure of victory. He gives the order to take the Empress to Pavia for her protection. He then leads the charge. The cavalry retreats and the Germans face the secret weapons of the scythes. The wagons filled with scythe-wielding men cut the cavalry down. Now with the German cavalry weakened the Lombard cavalry attacks them. In the battle Barozzi kills Lorenzo, Alberto's only remaining brother and attacks Alberto from behind, saying that he will send him to join his "whore in Hell." Alberto rams into Barozzi who drops his sword and falls to the ground, his helmet rolling off as Alberto lands atop him. As Barozzi cries and pathetically begs for his life, Alberto avenges his brothers by slowly driving a stiletto knife into Barozzi's throat, killing him. The Lombards win the battle. Found on the battlefield is a wounded Eleonora in full uniform. She tells Alberto that the Empress saved her life by substituting another woman to be burned in her place and moving the time of her execution so that Barozzi and the Emperor would not find out. Alberto gets his wife back.

The film ends with an onscreen text saying that three days after the battle of Legnano, Barbarossa reappeared at the court of Pavia. No one knows where he was or what he did during those three days. Fourteen years later, he left for the Crusades. On a spring evening, in Anatolia, he waded in the waters of the Salef River and, just as foretold, he met his death in the water after being bitten by a snake.

The audience is told "Alberto da Giussano lived a long life with Eleanora, and they had several children. The Company of Death was dispersed: the towns of the Lombard League had won their freedom."

== Cast ==
- Rutger Hauer as Frederick Barbarossa
- Raz Degan as Alberto da Giussano
- F. Murray Abraham as Siniscalco Barozzi
- Hristo Zhivkov as Gherardo Negro
- Antonio Cupo as Alberto dell'Orto
- Cécile Cassel as Beatrice I, Countess of Burgundy
- Kasia Smutniak as Eleonora
- Ángela Molina as Hildegard of Bingen
- Elena Bouryka as Antonia
- Hristo Shopov as Rinaldo di Dassel

== Production ==
The production was filmed on locations in Romania, including Alba Iulia, Bucharest and Hunedoara.

== See also ==
- List of historical drama films
