= Smokers Only =

2001 film

- Directed by: Verónica Chen
- Written by: Verónica Chen
- Starring: Cecilia Bengolea; Leonardo Brzezicki
- Cinematography: Nicolás Theodossiou
- Edited by: Luis César D'Angiolillo
- Music by: Edgardo Rudnitzky; Chango Spaciuk
- Release date: 2001
- Country: Argentine
- Language: Spanish

Smokers Only (Spanish: Vagón fumador) is a 2001 Argentine romantic drama film written and directed by Verónica Chen.

The film premiered at the 58th edition of the Venice Film Festival, in the Venice International Film Critics' Week sidebar. For this film, Chen won the Silver Caravel for Best New Director at the 27th Huelva Ibero-American Film Festival.

== Cast ==
- Cecilia Bengolea as Reni
- Leonardo Brzezicki as Andrés
- Adrián Fondari as Client
- Fernando Moumdjian as Armenio
