= Our Tropical Island =

2001 film

- Directed by: Marcello Cesena
- Written by: Marcello Cesena
- Story by: Thomas Bahmann
- Starring: Diego Abatantuono; Victoria Abril
- Cinematography: Régis Blondeau
- Music by: Bernardo Bonezzi; Paolo Silvestri
- Release date: 2001
- Language: Italian

Our Tropical Island (Italian: Mari del sud) is a 2001 Italian comedy film written and directed by Marcello Cesena and starring Diego Abatantuono and Victoria Abril.

== Cast ==
- Diego Abatantuono as Alberto
- Victoria Abril as Sabina
- Chiara Sani as Melania
- Stefano Scandaletti as Rocco
- Giulia Steigerwalt as Sandra
- Antonio Stornaiolo as Giacomo
- Clara Modugno as Mrs. Ines
- Enzo Cannavale as Sciallero
- Fiammetta Baralla as Miss Sciallero
- Nando Gazzolo as Tacchini
- Giuliana Calandra as Miss Tacchini
- Paolo Lombardi as Bormioli
- Vivian De La Cruz as Mai Van
- Valerio Capitolino as Carlo
- Barbara Bouchet as TV Presenter
- Enzo Iacchetti as Meteorologist
- Giulio Golia as Waiter
- Lucia Ocone as Cashier
- Isa Gallinelli as Cashier

== See also ==
- List of Italian films of 2001
