= Jia Hongsheng =

Chinese actor

- Jia in 2010
- Born: 19 March 1967; Siping, Jilin, China
- Died: 5 July 2010 (aged 43); Beijing, China
- Occupation: Actor
- Years active: 1988–2010

Chinese name
- Traditional Chinese: 賈宏聲
- Simplified Chinese: 贾宏声
Transcriptions
Standard Mandarin
- Hanyu Pinyin: Jiǎ Hóngshēng

Jia Hongsheng (simplified Chinese: 贾宏声; traditional Chinese: 賈宏聲; pinyin: Jiǎ Hóngshēng; 19 March 1967 – 5 July 2010) was a Chinese actor who became known in the late 1980s and early 1990s for roles in movies like The Case of the Silver Snake (1988), Good Morning, Beijing (1991), A Woman from North Shaanxi (1993) and Weekend Lover (1995). His performances were praised by critics and he developed a rebellious image that made him popular among artistic youth and the "Sixth Generation" of Chinese directors.

However, he backed away from the limelight in 1995 after becoming addicted to cannabis and eventually heroin. His father, head of the local theatre in Jilin, retired two years before his retirement age, and along with his wife moved to Beijing to try to help Jia. He made a comeback in 2000, starring in the celebrated Suzhou River. The following year he starred in the film he is best known for to Western audiences, the autobiographical Quitting. It depicts his battle with addiction and his family trying to help him sober up, with all of the cast members being real people playing themselves.

== Early life and career ==
Jia was born on 19 March 1967 in Siping, Jilin, to Jia Fengsen and Chai Xiuling, both retired theater actors from northeast China. He had a younger sister, Wang Tong.

Jia graduated from the Central Academy of Drama in Beijing in 1989, and soon gained fame in the late 1980s and early 1990s as an actor in films such as The Case of the Silver Snake and A Woman from North Shaanxi. While rehearsing for a stageplay titled Kiss of the Spider Woman (also directed by Zhang Yang) in the fall of 1992, Jia first became exposed to marijuana and eventually became addicted, while also occasionally using heroin. Then, in 1995, after filming Weekend Lover, Jia quit acting completely and lived off his younger sister Wang Tong. He was also an avid fan of The Beatles, listening to their music obsessively and began to fantasize himself as the son of the Beatles' lead singer, John Lennon.

In late 1995, his parents decided to move to Beijing in order to help their son quit drugs. Wang Tong also came back to live with her parents and brother in the same apartment. Several efforts made by his parents to penetrate their son's inner world were met with indifference, sometimes even hostility. Over time, however, Jia began to open up. He started to take regular walks with his father, usually buying a bottle or two of beer along the way. Jia Fengsen also bought his son cassette tapes by The Beatles.

In early 1996, Jia relapsed after being off drugs for almost six months. On 19 March of that year, after drinking several bottles of beer for the celebration of his twenty-ninth birthday, Jia slapped his father, claiming it was to teach him the "meaning of life". Jia's family was upset by this and felt he needed to be taught a lesson. They contacted the police, and three officers arrived at their house the next day. Jia was taken into custody and sent to a mental institution.

Upon arrival at the institution, after being placed on medication, his condition improved greatly. He also stopped fantasizing and started to see himself as just an ordinary human being. His doctor determined that Jia was not suffering from schizophrenia but recommended that he stay a little longer to sober completely. He was finally discharged on 19 March 1997, his thirtieth birthday.

2000's Suzhou River depicted his return to acting. The film is considered one of the most important of the "Sixth Generation" of Chinese cinema. His struggle with addiction was depicted in 2001's Quitting, in which he, his family and even the patients of the mental institution, play themselves. For the film, Jia Hongsheng won the 2002 Silver Screen Award for Best Actor.

In 2000, Jia began a four-year romantic involvement with Zhou Xun, his co-lead star in Suzhou River. He has been credited with getting her the lead role in Palace of Desire, having introduced her to director Li Shaohong.

== Death ==
On 5 July 2010, Jia jumped to his death from Building 19, his apartment building at the Anyuan Beili Community in Chaoyang District, Beijing that he shared with his parents. He was found dead on the trunk of a car around 6:00pm. In an announcement his parents said; "Our son is looking for his dream. Let's give him good wishes and respect his decision." Lei Ting, a theatre producer and close friend of Jia's, stated that when he met him in June, Jia seemed "fully recovered". Likewise, Zhang Yang, director of Quitting, stated that he had spoken to Jia about the actor's next film not long before his death.

== Filmography ==
- 1988 - The Case of the Silver Snake, Hao Feiyu
- 1988 - Samsara
- 1991 - Good Morning, Beijing!
- 1993 - A Woman from North Shaanxi
- 1993 - Hei huo, Zhao Mengyu
- 1994 - Suicides
- 1995 - Weekend Lover, A Xi
- 1997 - Frozen, Qi Lei
- 2000 - Suzhou River, Mardar
- 2001 - Quitting, Jia Hongsheng, himself

== Awards ==
Singapore International Film Festival - 2002 Silver Screen Award, Won for Best Actor in Quitting (2001).
