= Luca Di Fulvio =

Italian writer (1957–2023)

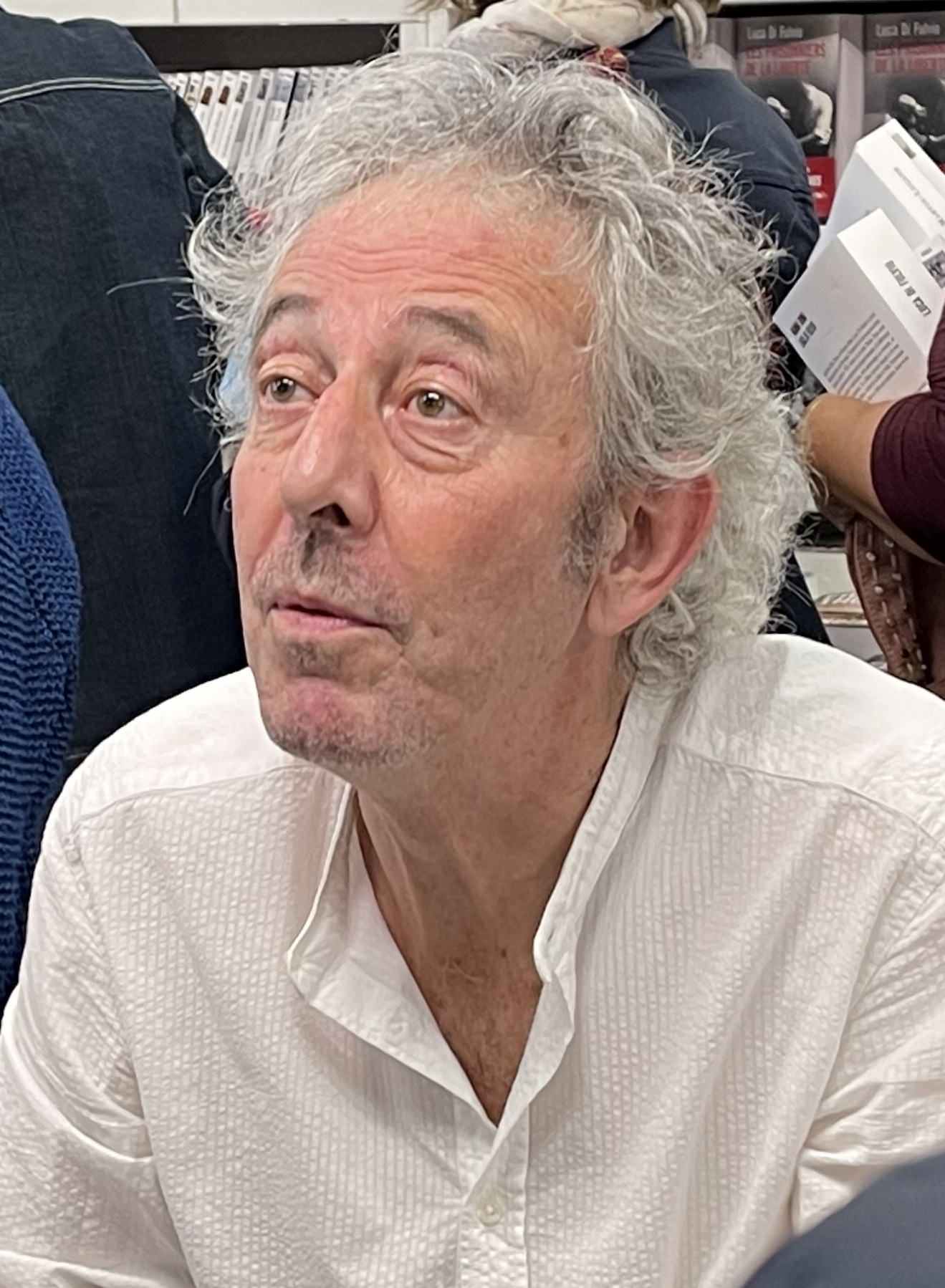
- Di Fulvio in 2021
- Born: 13 May 1957; Rome, Italy
- Died: 31 May 2023 (aged 66); Rome, Italy
- Occupation: Writer

Luca Di Fulvio (13 May 1957 – 31 May 2023), also known by the pen name Duke J. Blanco, was an Italian novelist and stage actor.

== Life and career ==
Born in Rome, Di Fulvio studied at the Accademia Nazionale di Arte Drammatica Silvio D'Amico, and then started his acting career, first being a member of The Living Theatre and later working on stage with Andrzej Wajda and with the theatrical company La Festa Mobile.

After working as an editorial consultant for several publishing houses, Di Fulvio made his literary debut in 1998, with the novel Zelter. He had his breakout in 2000, with his crime novel The Mannequin Man (Italian: L'impagliatore), which in 2004 was adapted in the film Eyes of Crystal. Among his best known works were the historical epic novels La scala di Dioniso ("The Dionysus' Staircase", 2006), The Boy Who Granted Dreams (Italian: La gang dei sogni, 2008), and The Girl who Reached for the Stars (Italian: La ragazza che toccava il cielo, 2015). More successful in France and Germany than in his home country, several of his later novels were first released abroad rather than in Italy. His 2020 novel La ballata della Città Eterna ("The Ballad of the Eternal City") was finalist at the 2021 Premio Bancarella.

Di Fulvio died of ALS on 31 May 2023, at the age of 66.
