= David's Birthday =

- DVD cover
- Directed by: Marco Filiberti
- Written by: Marco Filiberti; Deborah De Furia
- Produced by: Gianluca Leurini; Caroline Locardi; Agnes Trincal
- Starring: Alessandro Gassman; Maria de Medeiros; Massimo Poggio; Michela Cescon; Hristo Jivkov; Thyago Alves; Piera Degli Esposti
- Music by: Andrea Chenna
- Distributed by: Wolfe Video (US); TLA Releasing (UK)
- Release dates: 8 September 2009 (Venice Film Festival); 28 May 2010 (Italy)
- Running time: 106 minutes
- Country: Italy
- Languages: Italian; English

David's Birthday, (Italian title: Il compleanno), is a 2009 Italian drama film directed by Marco Filiberti.

== Plot ==
Two pairs of friends, Matteo and Francesca and Shary and Diego, decide to spend the summer together in a beach house at the foot of Mount Circeo. Matteo, a psychologist, is married to Francesca with whom he has a five-year-old girl, Elena. Diego and Shary have a less stable relationship, having a son together, David, who attends college in the United States. David comes to Italy for the first time in five years to spend time with his family and celebrate his birthday. Upon David's arrival, he and Matteo begin to develop feelings for each other. Only Leonard, Shary's brother, who has returned from his travels around the world to spend some time with the two pairs, seems to sense what is happening. The balance of Matteo's marriage begins to crack, and the growing tension seems to corrode the two families. While the rest of the household is out preparing for David's birthday party, Matteo goes to David's bedroom, and they have sex. When Francesca returns, she has no front-door keys and enters the house through a patio door into David's room where she finds the two men having sex. She runs out, and Matteo runs after her. She dashes around a corner and into the street where she is hit and killed by a car. Later, Matteo, Shary, Diego, and David are having supper. Shary asks Matteo accusingly where he was at the time of the accident, and the movie ends as he begins to cry.

== Cast ==
- Alessandro Gassmann − Diego
- Massimo Poggio − Matteo
- Maria de Medeiros − Francesca
- Michela Cescon − Shary
- Thyago Alves − David
- Christo Jivkov − Leonard
- Piera Degli Esposti − Giuliana
- Daniele De Angelis − Orazio
- Marianna De Rossi − Chicca

== Film Festivals ==
The film was presented at the following film festivals :

- 2009: Italy - Mostra Internazionale d'Arte Cinematografica
- 2009: Italy - Festival Internazionale del Film di Roma
- 2009: Brazil - São Paulo International Film Festival
- 2010: Brazil - Rio de Janeiro International Film Festival
