= Momo (2001 film) =

2001 film by Enzo D'Alò

- Italian theatrical release poster
- Directed by: Enzo D'Alò
- Written by: Enzo D'Alò; Umberto Marino
- Based on: Momo by Michael Ende
- Produced by: Vittorio Cecchi Gori
- Starring: Erica Necci; Diego Abatantuono; Giancarlo Giannini
- Edited by: Simona Paggi
- Music by: Gianna Nannini
- Production companies: Cecchi Gori Group Tiger Cinematografica; Taurus Produktion
- Distributed by: MFA Film Distribution; Universal Studios (Germany); Cecchi Gori Distribuzione (Italy)
- Release date: 21 December 2001
- Running time: 80 minutes
- Countries: Italy; Germany
- Language: Italian

Momo (Italian: Momo alla conquista del tempo, also known as Momo, the Conquest of Time) is a 2001 animated fantasy film directed by Enzo D'Alò. It is an adaptation of the 1973 fantasy novel Momo by Michael Ende. It spawned an animated series in 2003.

The film won a Silver Ribbon for Gianna Nannini's musical score, and was also nominated for Silver Ribbon for best screenplay.

== Plot ==
Momo is an orphan girl who finds herself in a town, where she makes friends with an old man, Beppo, who loves her as a granddaughter, and with Gigi, a child who immediately falls in love with her. Momo also knows other playmates: Enzo, Bruno, Livia and the little Chicco, who create a house in an ancient amphitheatre, and Cassiopea, a tortoise she finds on the street. But the city is invaded by the Gray Men who convince many people, including the ingenious barber Osvaldo Fusi, that they don't have much time left to live: the Grey Men's goal is to deposit all the people's time in their special "Bank of the time", which helps them to survive.

A Gray Man tries to bribe the little Momo with a very beautiful doll, but she manages to soften the heart of the Gray Man, humanizing him and turning him into a Gray-Pink Man, who admits that they always feel cold and they do not know what the warmth of love is. Momo then decides to immediately warn her friends, who in turn try to warn their parents to stay away from the Gray Men, but it's too late. After having eliminated the Gray-Pink Man, accused to be a traitor, the President of the Gray Men gives the order to capture Momo, who manages to escape from them thanks to Cassiopea, who leads her to a magical place. Momo is welcomed into the home of Master Hora, who controls time assisted by his faithful helpers, the time of day and the time of night, under the guise of a Rooster and an Owl.

Master Hora unveils to Momo the true nature of the Gray Men and the secret place where time lives. Momo listens to the Music of Light, a song that can break the spell of the Grey Men and free everyone, but the wise Master Hora tells her that it takes time for her to internalize the music, she has to sleep on it. Momo then goes to sleep, but meanwhile, the quiet town on Earth has turned into a huge metropolis. Poor Beppo, destroyed by the disappearance of Momo, is arrested and kept in an asylum after he tried to denounce the Grey Men to the authorities, and Gigi, who is hired by television, is threatened with dismissal if he keeps looking for Momo.

When Master Hora wakes up Momo, the town seems to be lost, but there is a way to save it: stop time. Master Hora can stop time by falling asleep, but only for an hour. The Grey Men steal the hours from the people and turn them into cigars which they must smoke continuously in order to avoid disappearing. If time stops, they can no longer steal hours and will eventually dissolve. Unfortunately, the evil Grey Men have a reserve of cigars in their Bank and, as long as they can access them, they have enough cigars to survive until the awakening of Hora; Momo should, therefore, be able to keep them away from storage the necessary time. The girl faces the great challenge, helped by Cassiopeia, and manages with purity of soul and kindness to defeat all the Grey Men, freeing all her friends. The town is saved and the sweet Momo can finally re-embrace Beppo; Gigi returns to what it once was and Momo will live happily ever after with her friends. To celebrate, Gigi and Momo dance in the amphitheatre in front of the city's people.

== Vocal cast ==
- Erica Necci as Momo
- Diego Abatantuono as Master Hora
- Giancarlo Giannini as President of the Grey Men
- Sergio Rubini as vice-president of the Grey Men
- Neri Marcorè as The Grey-Pink Man (Agent 4587)
- Michele Kalamera as Beppo
- Giulio Renzi Ricci as Gigi
- Gabriele Patriarca as Bruno
- Riccardo Rossi as Osvaldo Fusi
- Alina Moradei as The Owl
- Renzo Stacchi as The Rooster
- Claudio Sorrentino as The Commissioner
- Patrick Donati as Enzo

== See also ==
- List of Italian films of 2001
