= Pimpa =

Italian comic strip

Creative team
- Created by: Francesco Tullio Altan

Pimpa or La Pimpa is an Italian comic strip, created by Francesco Tullio Altan, whose main character is a red-spotted female dog with large feet and a small tail. Pimpa's tail and toes are red as well.

The comic strip made its debut on 13 July 1975 in Corriere dei Piccoli; it was published by the comics magazine until 1995, and from 1987 it also became the leading character of an eponymous monthly children's magazine. Pimpa was also the subject of three animated series, directed by Osvaldo Cavandoli and Enzo D'Alò, produced and broadcast by Rai TV and later released on DVD. In 1998 Pimpa was the main character in two stage plays, Pimpa Cappuccetto Rosso and Pimpa, Kamillo e il libro magico.

== Dubs ==
1. Albanian
2. Arabic
3. Catalan
4. Cimbrian
5. Czech
6. English
7. French
8. Friulian
9. German
10. Greek
11. Hebrew
12. Hungarian
13. Japanese
14. Ladin
15. Mocheno
16. Norwegian
17. Persian
18. Romanian
19. Sardinian
20. Scottish Gaelic
21. Serbian
22. Slovene
23. Swedish
24. Spanish (Spain)
25. Venetain

== Episodes ==
Season 1

1.Arriva la primavera
2.L'unione fa la forza
3.Portono le rondini
4.La casetta nuova
5.Un gita al mare
6.Una gita al polo
7.Al luna park
8.La formica Bibì
9.I cugini lontani
10.Il pupazzo di neve
11.A spasso con la tv
12.Il ristorante pazzo
13.La neve in pericolo
14.Il pane fatto in casa
15.Il riccio Riccardo
16.La lucciola Lucia
17.Una gita nella giungla
18.Una gita in Australia
19.Il piccolo Armando
20.Le scarpe di Armando
21.Il rubinetto rotto
22.Le ombre cinesi
23.L'aquilone e l'arcobaleno
24.La talpa pittrice
25.Sulla spiaggia
26.Un viaggio in Africa

Season 2 (Le nuove avventure)

1.In India col tappeto volante
2.Il tuono di primavera
3.Una giornata nell'orto
4.Gli amici funghi
5.L'orsetto lavatore
6.Il merlo fischiatore
7.Fa freddo orsetto!
8.L'elefantino giallo
9.Il circo
10.Il vitellino Vito
11.Il pavone Alfonso
12.L'ape e il battello a ruota
13.Gita nel deserto
14.Le tre cravatte
15.La corsa col treno
16.Il cucù
17.L'aeroplanino
18.La fabbrica della pizza
19.Il pinguino e il pesce rosso
20.Si va a pescare
21.Il cavallino selvaggio
22.Lo scimmiotto e il leone
23.La stella cadente
24.Una giornata con il sole
25.Un'avventura sottomarina
26.Al mare con l'orso polare

Season 3

1.La rana Rachele
2.Il gatto con gli stivali
3.Il vestito di Armando
4.Arriva Tito
5.Il signor Inverno
6.La scuola in vacanza
7.La casa colorata
8.La balena Milly
9.Il rinoceronte Rino
10.Il pane e il panino
11.Il coccodrillo Bibo
12.L'amica onda
13.Sassi e sassolini
14.Il sombrero messicano
15.Conigletto e telefono
16.Nuvole a primavera
17.Posta per l'elefante
18.La pizza gelata
19.Le primizie dell'orto
20.Picnic con Rosita
21.Arriva l'autunno
22.La civetta e la farfalla
23.Il tapiro Miro
24.Olivia e il gambero
25.Il computer Nicola
26.Il pianetino e l'ufo

Season 4

1.L'orsacchiotto Gigetto
2.Il pinguino Nino
3.La gita in Egito
4.Il pesce pilota
5.Il canguro Jack
6.La puzzola Sofia
7.La poltrona magra
8.La pianta carnivora
9.La cinghialina Zoe
10.Il granchio Giorgino
11.La foca Dudù
12.I fratelli coniglietti
13.Le stelle tuffanti
14.L'elefantina Isotta
15.La statua di Armando
16.Il lupetto Lodovico
17.Il cane da slitta
18.Bella coccinella
19.Il tesoro sommerso
20.La capretta tosaerba
21.In Africa con Tina e Leo
22.Tito fa il gallo
23.Il rinoceronte miope
24.La tartaruga a rotelle
25.Il dinosauro Dino
26.La iena che ride
