= Carlo Tullio Altan =

Italian anthropologist

Carlo Tullio Altan

Carlo Tullio Altan (30 March 1916 – 15 February 2005) was an Italian anthropologist, sociologist and philosopher. He was particularly known for his studies on the Italian national character, and was considered one of the pioneers of Italian cultural anthropology.

Altan was born in San Vito al Tagliamento, in Friuli. He died in Palmanova.

His son Francesco Tullio Altan is a popular comic books creator and satirist.

== Biography and career ==
Born into an ancient Friuli family in San Vito al Tagliamento, Carlo Tullio-Altan was one of Italy leading experts in cultural anthropology, as well as a philosopher, sociologist and intellectual.

Destined by his family for a diplomatic career, after high school studies in Udine, he Jurisprudence in 1940 with a degree in law from Università degli Studi di Roma "La Sapienza" in Rome with a thesis in international law.

Inviato in Albania durante la World War II, partecipa successivamente alla Italian resistance movement, militando nel Action Party (Italy).

After the events of the war, he met Benedetto Croce, thanks to whom he made his entrance into the Italian cultural scene.

Meeting Croce, he brings his thinking closer to Italian idealism and ethical Spiritualism (philosophy), as evidenced by his early works from this period. He then spent, beginning in the early 1950s, periods of study and research in Vienna, Paris and London, where he also approached anthropology and Ethnology.

From 1953, thanks to the influence of Ernesto De Martino, Remo Cantoni (whose voluntary assistant he will also be, starting in 1958) and Tullio Tentori, he devoted himself to anthropology, according to an approach that is not based exclusively on field research and ethnography but that makes recourse above all to philosophical thought, the history of religions, epistemology,sociology, and psychology. Moreover, influenced as well by the work of Bronisław Malinowski, he opposed structuralism, later adhering to functionalism as well as to a Marxism mediated by the French Nouvelle histoire school.

Having obtained his free professorship in anthropology, in 1961 he was assigned, for the first time in Italy, the teaching post of Cultural Anthropology at the Humanities and Philosophy of the University of Pavia, later held at the Faculty of Sociology of the University of Trento. Then, as a full professor of the same discipline, he worked at the Faculty of Political Science "Cesare Alfieri" of the University of Florence and, from 1978 until his retirement (in 1991), at the Faculty of Humanities of the University of Trieste, of which he was later appointed professor emeritus.

Nel 1987, organizza a Roma, insieme ai maggiori antropologi italiani di allora, il primo "Convegno nazionale di antropologia delle società complesse", che, negli anni, verrà riorganizzato più volte.

Negli ultimi anni, ha vissuto tra Milan e un'antica casa rurale tra Aquileia e Grado, Friuli Venezia Giulia, la stessa dove lavora il figlio Francesco Tullio Altan.

On the basis of his initial university training in historical-legal disciplines, as well as his extensive philosophical and cultural knowledge, after an initial phase of original research on religion phenomenology and symbol, he turned his attention toward anthropological methods applied to sociology analysis, then devoted himself to the study of the behaviors and values of Italian youth in the 1960s-1970s, which then led him to investigate, from a historical-cultural perspective and with a somewhat critical view, the Identity (social science) dimension of Italians.

Altan ha poi cercato di far capire sia all'opinione pubblica che ai politici italiani l'importanza e la necessità di dare al loro Country una religione civil. In questo progetto, vanno inserite alcune fra le sue opere più recenti come La coscienza civile degli italiani e il manuale di Citizenship education (subject).

The last period of his research activity, he devoted it to the study of the basic Symbol components of Identity (social science), focusing, to this end, on the Theory of categoriesof ethnos, identifying and analyzing its five main components, namely the "epos" (i.e.,Collective memory), the "ethos" (i.e., the sacralization of norms and rules into values) the "logos" (i.e., interpersonal language), the ‘genos’ (i.e., the idea of a common descent) and the "topos" (i.e., the symbol of a collective communal Identity (social science) settled on a given territory), in order to find a possible rational solution, from the perspective of anthropology, to the conflicts between the various Ethnocentrism.

== Selected bibliography ==
- Lo spirito religioso del mondo primitivo (1960)
- Antropologia funzionale (1968)
- Valori, classi sociali e scelte politiche (with Alberto Marradi 1976)
- Manuale di antropologia culturale: storia e metodo (1979)
- Modi di produzione e lotta di classe in Italia (with Roberto Cartocci, 1979)
- Antropologia, storia e problemi (1983)
- La nostra Italia (1986)
- Populismo e trasformismo (1989)
- Soggetto, simbolo e valore: Per un'ermeneutica antropologica (1992)
- Ethnos e Civiltà: Identità etniche e valori democratici (1995)
- La coscienza civile degli italiani: Valori e disvalori nella storia nazionale (1997)
- Religioni, simboli, società: Sul fondamento umano dell'esperienza religiosa (with Marcello Massenzio, 1998)
- Le grandi religioni a confronto: L'età della globalizzazione (2002)
