= Who Are You? (2001 film) =

2001 film

- Directed by: João Botelho
- Screenplay by: João Botelho
- Starring: Rui Morrison
- Cinematography: Elso Roque
- Edited by: João Botelho; Waldir Xavier
- Music by: António Pinho Vargas
- Release date: 2001
- Language: Portuguese

Who Are You? (Portuguese: Quem És Tu?) is a 2001 Portuguese historical drama film written and directed by João Botelho. It premiered in competition at the 58th Venice International Film Festival.

== Cast ==
- Rui Morrison as Manuel de Sousa Coutinho / Friar Luís de Sousa
- Suzana Borges as Madalena de Vilhena
- Patrícia Guerreiro as Donna Maria de Noronha
- José Pinto as Telmo Pais
- Rogério Samora as Friar Jorge
- Francisco D'Orey as O Romeiro / D. João de Portugal
- Gustavo Sumpta as Miranda
- Marga Muguambe as Doroteia
- Carlos Costa as Prior of Benfica
- Bruno Martelo as Sebastian I
- Luís Pinhão as Henry I

== Production ==
The film is an adaptation of the Almeida Garrett's 1843 drama play Frei Luís de Sousa.

== Release ==
The film entered the main competition at the 58th edition of the Venice Film Festival, in which it was awarded the Fondazione Mimmo Rotella Prize.

== Reception ==
Variety's critic David Stratton described the film as "like an opera without music, or akin to filming a Shakespeare play on stage without opening up its cinematic possibilities". Roberto Nepoti from La Repubblica praised it, referring to it as "a splendid and difficult film", "a bare and elegant, solemnand heartbreaking representation that challenges you but, in the end, leaves you admiring and enriched". Lietta Tornabuoni in La Stampa called it " an exceptional film" and wrote "one watches such an unusual film with a sense of ecstatic awe of a unique experience".
