= That Love =

2001 French film

- Theatrical release poster
- Directed by: Josée Dayan
- Written by: Josée Dayan; Yann Andréa; Maren Sell; Gilles Taurand
- Produced by: Alain Sarde
- Starring: Jeanne Moreau
- Cinematography: Caroline Champetier
- Edited by: Anne Boissel
- Music by: Angelo Badalamenti
- Production companies: Arte France Cinéma; Canal+ Studio Images 7
- Distributed by: BAC Films
- Release date: 2001
- Running time: 100 minutes
- Country: France
- Language: French

That Love (French: Cet amour-là) is a 2001 French drama film co-written and directed by Josée Dayan.

The film premiered out of competition at the 58th edition of the Venice Film Festival, serving as the closing film of the festival.

== Cast ==
- Jeanne Moreau as Marguerite Duras
- Aymeric Demarigny as Yann Andréa
- Christiane Rorato as the woman in a smock
- Sophie Milleron as the night nurse
- Justine Lévy as the hospital employee
- Stanislas Sauphanor as the buffet waiter
- Didier Lesour as the café waiter
- Tanya Lopert as the ambassador's wife

== Reception ==
On the review aggregator website Rotten Tomatoes, 52% of 23 critics' reviews are positive, with an average rating of 5.6/10.
