= Domenica (2001 film) =

2001 film by Wilma Labate

- Directed by: Wilma Labate
- Starring: Claudio Amendola; Domenica Giuliano; Annabella Sciorra
- Cinematography: Alessandro Pesci
- Music by: Paolino Dalla Porta
- Release date: 2001
- Running time: 94 minutes
- Country: Italy

Domenica (also known as Sunday) is a 2001 Italian drama film directed by Wilma Labate. It entered the "Panorama" section at the 51st Berlin International Film Festival.

== Plot ==
Naples. Inspector Sciarra, afflicted by an incurable disease and on the eve of retirement, has the task of accompanying Domenica - a 12-year-old orphan - to the morgue to recognize the body of her rapist. His rapist, in fact, commits suicide in the police by jumping out of the window, and this recognition would help the police to avoid problems. It is the commissioner himself who asks Inspector Sciarra to track down the girl, who lives by tricks and wandering around the city. After several attempts, Inspector Sciarra spends an afternoon with Domenica at, at the end of the day. both will realize that they have been used and that a deep emotional bond has been established between them.

== Cast ==
- Domenica Giuliano as Domenica
- Claudio Amendola as Inspector Sciarra
- Annabella Sciorra as Betibù
- Valerio Binasco as Porcaro
- Peppe Servillo as Police commissioner
- Rosalinda Celentano as a nun

== See also ==
- List of Italian films of 2001
