= Verónica Chen =

Argentine film director and screenwriter

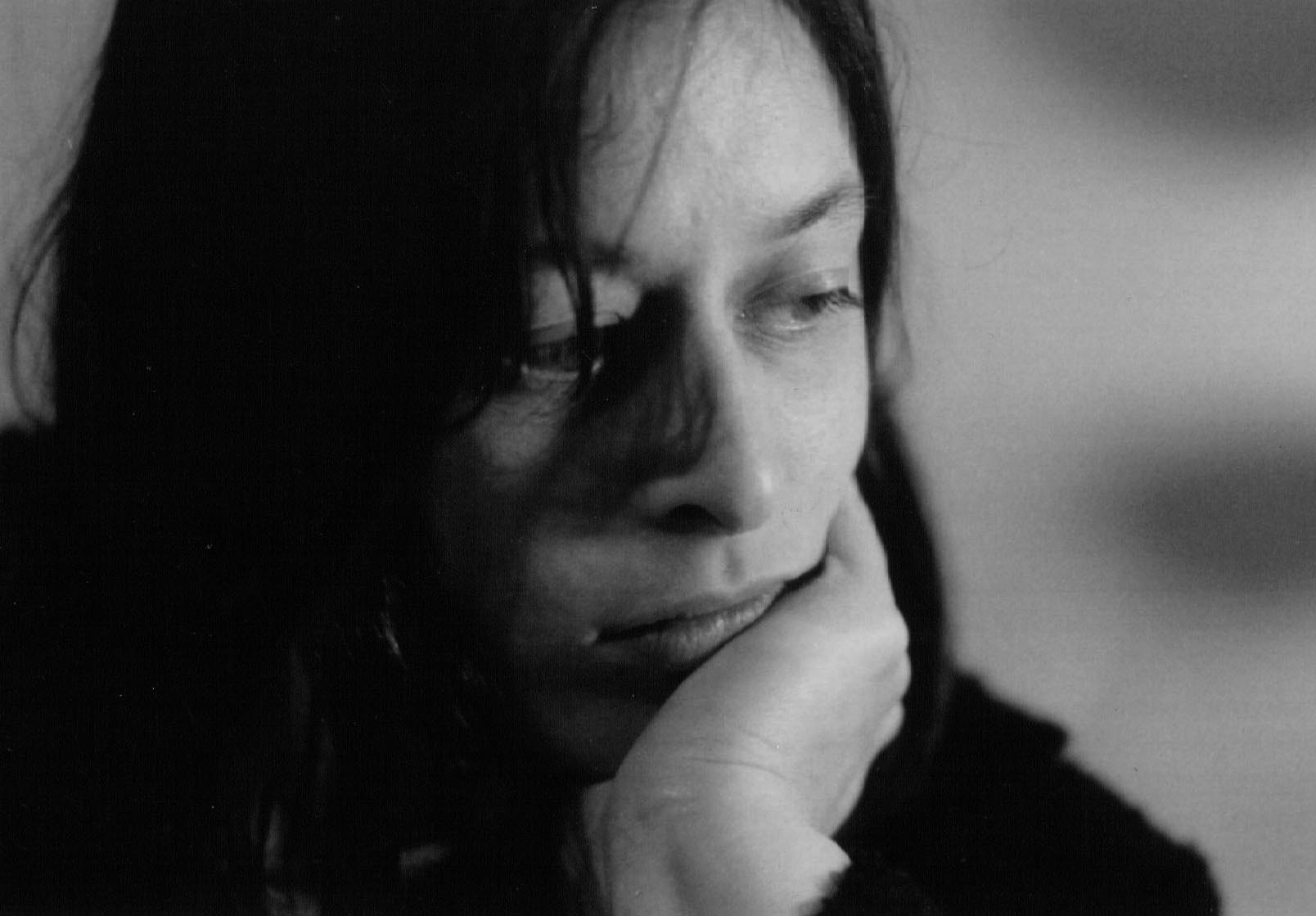
- Verónica Chen (2010)
- Born: 1969 (age 56–57); Buenos Aires, Argentina
- Education: Escuela Nacional de Experimentación y Realización Cinematográfica
- Occupations: film director; editor; producer; screenwriter
- Notable work: Marea alta (2020)
- Movement: Argentine New Wave movement

Verónica Chen (born 1969) is an Argentine film director, film editor, and screenwriter. She is part of the Argentine New Wave movement. In 2020, she received the Best New Director award for Vagón Fumador at the Huelva Ibero-American Film Festival.

== Biography ==
Verónica Chen was born in Buenos Aires in 1969. Her father was a Chinese diplomat, who was from Nanking and who emigrated to Argentina due to the Japanese invasion. Chen's mother is of Genoese ancestry. Chen has two older brothers.

Chen grew up in Texas, living in Dallas for four years and attending school there. After the family returned to Argentina, Chen remained in Argentina and her brothers moved back to Dallas.

She studied at Escuela Nacional de Experimentación y Realización Cinematográfica, (Note: At the time, this film was called the Centro de Experimentación y Realización Cinematográfica.) which is a film school that is run by the Argentine National Film Board. Chen graduated from the school as a director. While attending the school, she worked as editing assistant to Luis César D'Angiolillo and eventually made fifteen films with him.

As a film director, she is best known for producing films in the thriller genre. She also explores issues of gender.

== Filmography ==
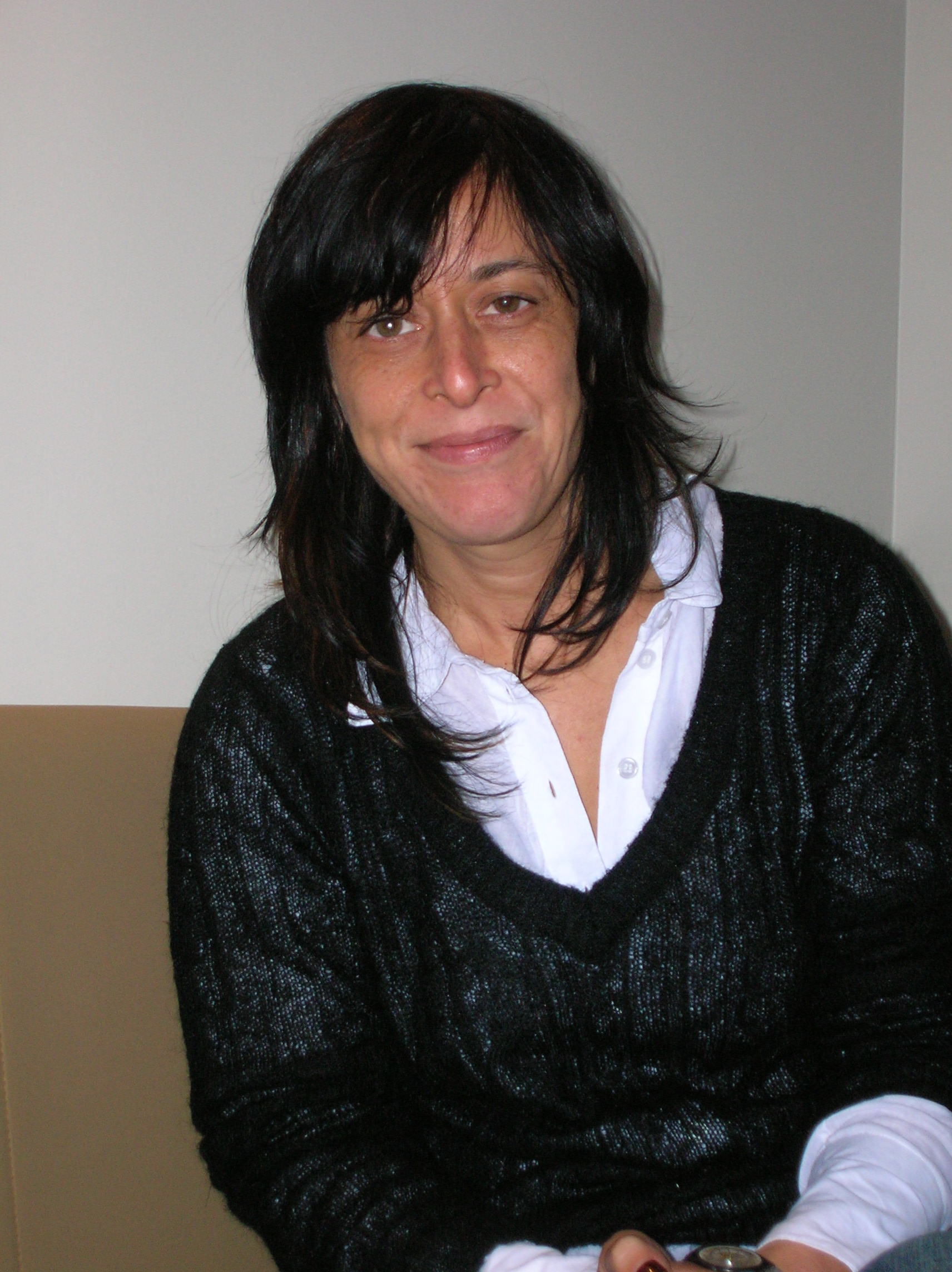
Verónica Chen (2007)

Chen's has been involved in various feature films, short films and television series as a director, screenwriter, editor or producer. Her involvement in significant projects is listed below.

Year	Title	Format	Director	Screenwriter	Editor	Producer
1994	Los Inocentes	Short film	x			
1994	Qué felicidad	Short film	x			
1995	Ariel Lavalle	Short film	x			
1995	Soldado	Short film	x			
1996	2015	Short film	x			
1996	Calor humano	Short film	x			
1997	Ezeiza	Short film	x	x		
1998	A Chrysanthemum Bursts in Cincoesquinas	Feature film			x	
1999	Paseador de almas	Short film			x	
2000	Esperando el Mesías	Feature film			x	
2001	Smokers Only	Feature film	x	x	x	x
2003	Overblinded	Feature film	x			
2003	Aguas argentinas	Feature film	x			
2003	Ensayo	TV series	x	x		
2006	Agua	Feature film	x	x		
2007	Fronteras argentinas: Por la razón o la fuerza	TV film	x	x		
2008	El frasco	Feature film	x	x		
2009	Paseador de almas	Short film			x	
2010	Viaje sentimental	Feature film	x	x		x
2013	Mujer conejo	Feature film	x	x		x
2019	Rosita	Feature film	x	x		x
2020	Marea alta	Feature film	x	x		

== Awards ==
- 2001: Huelva Ibero-American Film Festival - won Best New Director award for Vagón Fumador.
- 2020: Miami International Film Festival - nominated for the HBO Ibero-American Film Competition Best Film Award for High Tide (Marea Alta), and nominated for the Knight Marimbas Award.
- 2020: Sitges Film Festival - won Blood Window Award for Best Ibero-American Feature Film for High Tide (Marea Alta), and nominated for the New Visions Award for Best Film for High Tide.
- 2020: Splat!FilmFest - nominated for the Audience Award for Best Film for High Tide, and nominated for the Final Girl award.
- 2020: Sundance Film Festival - nominated for the Grand Prize of the Universal Film Jury for Dramatic Films for Marea alta.
