= Burning in the Wind =

- Directed by: Silvio Soldini
- Written by: Doriana Leondeff; Silvio Soldini
- Story by: Agota Kristof
- Starring: Ivan Franek
- Cinematography: Luca Bigazzi
- Music by: Giovanni Venosta
- Release date: 2002
- Language: Italian

Burning in the Wind (Italian: Brucio nel vento) is a 2002 Italian-Swiss romance-drama film written and directed by Silvio Soldini. It is based on the Agota Kristof's short novel Hier.

It was entered into the main competition at the 52nd Berlin International Film Festival. For this film Luca Bigazzi won the Nastro d'Argento for best cinematography and the Globo d'oro in the same category.

== Cast ==
- Ivan Franek as Tobias
- Barbora Lukesová as Line
- Ctirad Götz as Janek
- Caroline Baehr as Yolanda
- Cécile Pallas as Eve
- Petr Forman as Pavel
- Zuzana Mauréry as Katy
