= The Good War (film) =

- Directed by: Giorgio Serafini
- Screenplay by: Giorgio Serafini
- Produced by: Giuseppe Pedersoli; Alessandro Verdecchi
- Starring: Roy Scheider; Luca Zingaretti
- Cinematography: Adolfo Troiani
- Edited by: Rinaldo Marsili
- Music by: Carlo Siliotto
- Release date: January 11, 2002 (Spain)
- Running time: 96 minutes
- Countries: United States; Italy
- Language: English

The Good War is a 2002 American-Italian historical war drama film written and directed by Giorgio Serafini and starring Roy Scheider and Luca Zingaretti.

== Cast ==
- Roy Scheider as Colonel Gartner
- Luca Zingaretti as Luigi Manin
- Vincent Riotta as Italian POW
- Sue Cremin as Betty
- Charles Fathy as Luca
- Robert Farrior as Lt. Donovan
- Giampiero Judica as Fabio
- Luciano Miele as Italo
- Mario Opinato as Lieutenant Carlo Ticinà
