= Weekend Lover =

- Film poster
- Directed by: Lou Ye
- Written by: Xu Qin
- Produced by: Zhang Haimin; Nai An
- Starring: Jia Hongsheng; Ma Xiaoqing; Wang Zhiwen
- Cinematography: Zhang Xigui
- Edited by: Liu Jialin; Lou Ye; Xu Dong
- Music by: Zhang Shaotong
- Production company: Fujian Film Studio
- Release date: November 13, 1995 (Turin)
- Running time: 96 minutes
- Country: China
- Language: Mandarin Chinese

Weekend Lover (Chinese: 周末情人; pinyin: Zhōu mò qíng rén) is the 1995 directorial debut by Chinese director Lou Ye. The film stars actors Jia Hongsheng and Ma Xiaoqing. Fellow director Wang Xiaoshuai also plays a minor role.

The film follows a young man, A Xi, who is recently released from prison. Once released, he seeks out his old girlfriend Li Xin, who has since begun a relationship with La La, a young musician. As the two men vie for her attention, tension and violence escalate.

== Cast ==
- Jia Hongsheng — A Xi, a young man recently released from prison where he had served a term for murder of a fellow teenager.
- Ma Xiaoqing — Li Xin, A Xi's ex-girlfriend.
- Wang Zhiwen — La La, Li Xin's new boyfriend.
- Nai An — Chen Chen, the film's narrator.
- Wang Xiaoshuai — Zhang Chi, a musician in La La's band.

== Production ==
Weekend Lover served as Lou Ye's first feature-film since graduating from the Beijing Film Academy in 1989 and is notable for having the youngest production team in Chinese cinematic history upon its release. Shot and produced in 1993 and 1994, once complete, the film was banned for two years by the Chinese film censors; after the ban ended, Weekend Lover was released internationally at the tail end of 1995.

== Reception ==
Weekend Lover's noir-style and tales of violent disaffected youth led to its comparison with similar films of the period, notably Zhang Yuan's Beijing Bastards. Like that film, Weekend Lover is also considered a defining film for the "Sixth Generation" of Chinese cinema, particularly in its tone and subject matter that focuses on modern urban life instead of traditional Chinese history. Less positive reviews often praised the film as technically assured, but convoluted in its plotting leading at least one reviewer to refer to it as a "minor festival curio."

=== Premieres and awards ===
The film managed to premiere at a handful of foreign film festivals, notably the Turin Young Cinema Festival in 1995. It eventually went on to win the Werner Fassbinder Award for Best Direction at the 1996 Mannheim-Heidelberg International Film Festival.
