= Sailing Home (film) =

2001 film

- Directed by: Vincenzo Marra
- Written by: Vincenzo Marra
- Produced by: Gianluca Arcopinto; Amedeo Pagani
- Starring: Salvatore Iaccarino
- Cinematography: Ramiro Civita
- Edited by: Luca Benedetti
- Music by: Andrea Guerra
- Release date: 2001
- Running time: 88 minutes
- Country: Italy
- Language: Italian

Sailing Home (Italian: Tornando a casa) is a 2001 Italian drama film written and directed by Vincenzo Marra, in his feature film debut.

The film premiered at the 58th edition of the Venice Film Festival, in which it won the jury prize of the Venice International Film Critics' Week sidebar. The film also won the Grand Prize at the international competition of the 4th Buenos Aires International Festival of Independent Cinema.

For this film, Marra received a David di Donatello nominatiob for Best Directorial Debut and a Nastro d'Argento nomination as Best New Director.

== Cast ==
- Aniello Scotto D'Antuono as Franco Aniello
- Salvatore Iaccarino as Sasà
- Giovanni Iaccarino as Giovanni
- Azouz Abdelaziz as Samir
- Silverio Iaccarino as Silverio
- Roberta Papa as Rosa
