= Deep Breath (2001 film) =

2001 French film

- Directed by: Damien Odoul
- Written by: Damien Odoul
- Starring: Pierre-Louis Bonnetblanc
- Cinematography: Pascale Granel
- Edited by: Gwenola Heaulme
- Release date: 2001
- Country: France
- Language: French

Deep Breath (French: Le Souffle) is a 2001 French drama film written and directed by Damien Odoul, in his feature film debut.

The film premiered in the Cinema of the Present competition at the 58th edition of the Venice Film Festival, in which it won the section's special jury prize and the Fipresci award.

== Cast ==
- Pierre-Louis Bonnetblanc as David
- Dominique Chevallier as Jacques
- Maxime Dalbrut as Paul, David's uncle
- Jean-Claude Lecante as Jean-Claude
- Stéphane Terpereau as Stef
- Pierre Lasvaud as Pierrot
- Laurent Simon as Matthieu
- Laure Magadoux as Aurore

== Reception ==
On the review aggregator website Rotten Tomatoes, 75% of 8 critics' reviews are positive.
