= Vincenzo Marra =

Italian filmmaker (born 1972)

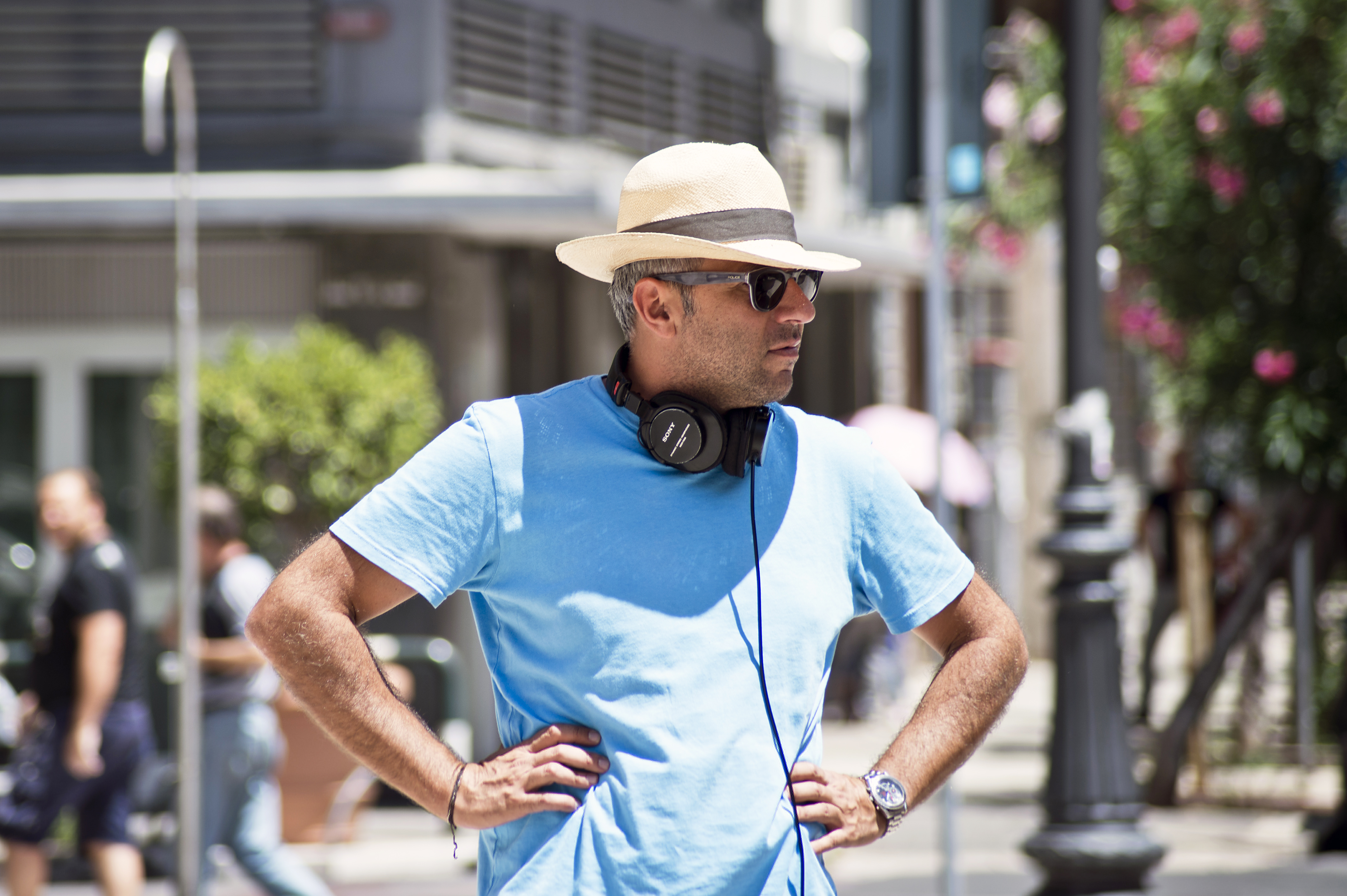
- Marta in 2017
- Born: 18 September 1972 (age 53); Naples, Italy
- Occupations: Film director, screenwriter

Vincenzo Marra (born Naples, 18 September 1972) is an Italian filmmaker.

== Filmography ==
- 2001 - Sailing Home
- 2002 - E.A.M. - Estranei alla massa (documentary)
- 2003 - Paesaggio a sud
- 2004 - Vento di terra
- 2005 - 58% (documentary)
- 2006 - L'udienza è aperta (documentary)
- 2007 - The Trial Begins
- 2014 - Bridges of Sarajevo
- 2015 - First Light
