= Enzo D'Alò =

Italian animator and film director

- Born: 7 September 1953 (age 71); Naples, Italy
- Occupation(s): Animator, director

Enzo D'Alò (born 7 September 1953) is an Italian animator and director.

== Life and career ==
Born in Naples, D'Alò moved to Turin in 1979 and there he started his career as animator working with the group "La Lanterna Magica". In 1983 he debuted as director of animated shorts, and in 1991 he was chosen to direct the TV-series Pimpa, based on the comic character with the same name. After his feature film debut with How the Toys Saved Christmas, D'Alò got a large audience success and critical acclaim with his second work, Lucky and Zorba.

== Filmography ==
- Pimpa (TV, 1991)
- How the Toys Saved Christmas (1996)
- Lucky and Zorba (1998)
- Momo (2001)
- Opopomoz (2003)
- Pinocchio (2013)
- Pipì Pupù e Rosmarina (TV, 2009; 2014–present)
- The Chip Maker (2015)
- A Greyhound of a Girl (2023)
