= Light of My Eyes =

2001 film by Giuseppe Piccioni

- Directed by: Giuseppe Piccioni
- Cinematography: Arnaldo Catinari
- Edited by: Esmeralda Calabria
- Music by: Ludovico Einaudi
- Release date: 2001
- Language: Italian

Luce dei miei occhi (internationally released as Light of My Eyes) is a 2001 Italian romance-drama film directed by Giuseppe Piccioni.

The film entered the 58th Venice International Film Festival, where Luigi Lo Cascio and Sandra Ceccarelli were awarded with the Volpi Cup for Best Actor and Best Actress, respectively.

== Cast ==
- Luigi Lo Cascio: Antonio
- Sandra Ceccarelli: Maria
- Silvio Orlando: Saverio
- Barbara Valente: Lisa
- Toni Bertorelli: Mario
- Valeria Sabel: Old woman
