= Sandra Ceccarelli =

Italian film actress

- Born: 3 July 1967 (age 59); Milan, Italy
- Occupation: Actress
- Years active: 1985–present
- Height: 1.70 m (5 ft 7 in)

Sandra Ceccarelli (born 3 July 1967) is an Italian film actress.

Daughter of Franco Ceccarelli, guitarist of the 1960s and 1970s Italian rock group Equipe 84, and Sandra von Glasersfeld (daughter of philosopher Ernst von Glasersfeld), Ceccarelli had her film debut at the age of sixteen in Giuseppe Bertolucci's 1985 film Segreti segreti.

Between 1995 and 1997, she studied acting with Carlos Alsina and Giorgio Albertazzi. After spending several years in theatre, she returned to film in 2001 starring in Ermanno Olmi's film The Profession of Arms and Giuseppe Piccioni's Light of My Eyes, for which she won the Volpi Cup for Best Actress at the 2001 Venice Film Festival.

She also starred in Piccioni's 2004 film The Life I Want, which won her a second nomination for the David di Donatello for Best Actress award (the Italian equivalent of the Academy Award), and a nomination for the 2005 European Film Award for Best Actress (which she lost to Germany's Julia Jentsch).

She also appeared in the 2006 Austrian biopic Klimt about the painter Gustav Klimt and the 2006 Croatian film Libertas about the Renaissance playwright Marin Držić.

== Selected filmography ==
Year	Title	Role	Notes
2001	The Profession of Arms	Noblewoman	
2002	Light of My Eyes	Maria	Volpi Cup for Best Actress; Pasinetti Award for Best Actress; Nominated—David di Donatello for Best Actress; Nominated—Italian Golden Globe Award for Best Actress
2002	The Best Day of My Life	Rita	Nastro d'Argento for Best Supporting Actress
2004	The Life That I Want	Laura/Eleonora	4th Bastia Italian Film Festival - Best Actress; Nominated—David di Donatello for Best Actress; Nominated—European Film Award for Best Actress
2004	Do You Know Claudia?	Silvia	
2006	Klimt	Serena Lederer	
2006	Libertas	Countess Desa	
2006	The Crown Prince	Empress Elisabeth of Austria	TV miniseries
2007	Family Game	Lisa	
2018	Red Land	Madre Visantrin	
2021	Blanca	Timperi	TV series
2023	A Hundred Sundays	Margherita	
