= Dessy Tenekedjieva =

Bulgarian actress (born 1971)

- Born: Desislava Ivanova Tenekedjieva; 12 April 1971 (age 55); Varna, Bulgaria
- Education: Krastyo Sarafov National Academy for Theatre and Film Arts
- Occupations: Actress; film producer; singer
- Spouse: Stoyan Kambarev m. ?–1998
- Children: Yosif Kambarev
- Parents: Ivan Tenekedzhiev (father); Tatyana Moisei Holost (mother)
- Relatives: Kiril Ivanov Tenekedzhiev (brother)

Desislava Ivanova "Dessy" Tenekedjieva Desislava Ivanova Tenekedjieva (Bulgarian: Десислава Иванова Тенекеджиева – Деси, born 12 April 1971) is a Bulgarian actress, singer, and film producer.

== Early life and education ==
Desislava Ivanova Tenekedjieva was born in Varna, Bulgaria to a Bulgarian father, Ivan Tenekedjiev, and a Ukrainian-Jewish mother, Tatyana Moisei Holost. She graduated from the French Language School in Varna, Bulgaria, and studied at the Krastyo Sarafov National Academy for Theatre and Film Arts, where she graduated in 1995. In her early years, she practiced gymnast and played tennis, competing in tournaments and ski competitions, and winning several awards. She also placed first in regional and national mathematical Olympiads.

== Career ==
Tenekedjieva made her cinematic debut at the age of 14 in the movie Forbidden for Adults, directed by Plamen Maslarov. Since then, she has appeared in more than 30 movies, acting in international productions and representing Bulgaria at international cinema forums and festivals.

Some of her more notable films include:

- Eyes of Crystal, directed by Eros Puglielli (Official Selection at the International Venice Film Festival)
- Chechenia, directed by Leonardo Julliano
- Ventitre, directed by Duccio Forzano
- The Conscience Case, directed by Luigi Perelly
- The Most Important Things, directed by Ivan Andonov
- Watchman, directed by Ivailo Jamabazov
- Killer Rats, directed by Tibor Takach
- Il Mеstiere Delle Armi, directed by Ermanno Olmi
- Operation Delta Force 4: Deep Fault, directed by Mark Roper
- La Rivolta del Cittadino, directed by Luigi Perelly
- The Homecoming by Harold Pinter, directed by Stoyan Kambarev
- Rosita, please, directed by Ventura Ponce
- The Camp, directed by Georgi Dulgerov

Tenekedjieva played Maria Medici in the film Il Mеstiere Delle Armi, directed by Ermanno Olmi. The film was selected for the Cannes Film Festival, making Tenekedjieva the first Bulgarian actress with a main role in a movie from the festival's official section. Il Mеstiere Delle Armi received nine David di Donatello awards including Best Film.

Tenekedjieva has also acted in theatre productions, including Three Sisters by Anton Chekhov, directed by Stoyan Kambarev, and The Master and Margarita by Mikhail Bulgakov, directed by Teddy Moskov, presented at world theater festivals such as Avignon, Edinburgh, Moscow, Jerusalem, and Zurich. She produced and performed the main part in "LUBOVNIKA.COM" (The Lesson) by Eugène Ionesco, directed by Boiko Bogdanov, in the Little City Theater Off the Channel in Sofia.

Tenekedjieva also has a music career. Together with Nikolai Ivanov, she is an author and performer in a musical ethno project based on Bulgarian folklore. The music videos "Dark," feat. John Kaleka; "When It All Ended," feat. Miro (KariZma); and "I Wonder," featuring Magga have charted on television and radio. Tenekedjieva directs music videos in collaboration with the cameraman Georgi Markov, and collaborated with director Ivailo Palmov on the music video for "When It All Ended".

Since 2000, Tenekedjieva and her production company NOVA Film have completed and presented musical, theatre, cinema, and television projects. Bulgaria's official accession to the European Union was marked by a celebratory concert held by Tenekedjieva and the musical group INSIDE at the City Hall in Berlin, Germany. Deutsche Welle’s Euromaxx featured Tenekedjieva in a segment about her career.

In 2009, she was working with Trinity Studio, music producer Magga, and sound director Dimitar Ganchev-Mite on her album, "Chillout Project." From 2000 – 2005, Tenekedjieva was a representative for the fashion house of Jean Paul Gaultier in Bulgaria. From 2007 to 2008 she had an advertising contract with the Japanese company Suzuki.

Tenekedjieva is the president of the Stoyan Kambarev Foundation, created in memory of theatre director Stoyan Kambarev, her husband. The foundation aims to 'discover, encourage and support young people in the field of art.'

== Filmography ==
Year	Title	Role	Notes
1988	Big Game	Actress	TV mini series
2018	Saving My Pig	Actress	As Nora
2022	The Wheels of Heaven	Producer	Feature film starring Mickey Rourke
2022	The Yesterday	Actress	Short Film
