= The Profession of Arms (2001 film) =

2001 Italian film directed by Ermanno Olmi

The Profession of Arms (Il mestiere delle armi)
- Directed by: Ermanno Olmi
- Written by: Ermanno Olmi
- Produced by: Alexander Metodiev
- Starring: Hristo Zhivkov; Desislava Tenekedjieva; Sandra Ceccarelli
- Music by: Fabio Vacchi
- Distributed by: A-Film Distribution
- Release date: 11 May 2001 (Italy)
- Running time: 105 minutes
- Country: Italy
- Language: Italian

The Profession of Arms (Italian: Il mestiere delle armi) is a 2001 Italian film directed by Ermanno Olmi.

Presented at the 54th Cannes Film Festival, the film chronicles the last battles of condottiero Giovanni de' Medici (Giovanni delle Bande Nere) during the Italian Wars of the 16th century.

== Plot ==
In autumn 1526, during the War of the League of Cognac, Emperor Charles V sends veteran general Georg von Frundsberg with an army of German Landsknechte to march towards Rome. General Francesco Maria della Rovere, commander of the outnumbered Papal armies, orders Captain Giovanni de' Medici and his Black Bands to harry their march; de' Medici pursues the Imperial troops through the Lombard countryside in the midst of a harsh winter, using his light cavalry to hit the Imperial supply trains with hit-and-run raids.

Federico II Gonzaga, the Marquis of Mantua, intent on avoiding war in his domain, allows the Imperial armies to cross the Po through his fortifications at Curtatone, denying passage a few hours later to the Papal troops. The Imperial vanguard reaches Ferrara, where Alfonso I d'Este provides Frundsberg with four falconets capable of piercing any type of armor, in exchange for the marriage of his heir to an Imperial princess.

The exhausted Black Bands manage to reach an Imperial detachment at Governolo, where de' Medici intends to capture Frundsberg. In the ensuing skirmish, de' Medici is wounded in the leg by a falconet shot and transported to Mantua. The attempts to cure his gangrenous wound fail and he dies of sepsis. The Imperial armies assault Rome.

The film ends straightforwardly with the declaration made after the death of Giovanni de' Medici by the commanders of the armies in Europe of ceasing to use firearms because of their cruelty.

== Cast ==
- Hristo Zhivkov - Giovanni de Medici
- Sergio Grammatico - Federico Gonzaga
- Dimitar Rachkov - Luc'Antonio Cuppano
- Fabio Giubbani - Matteo Cusastro
- Sasa Vulicevic - Pietro Aretino
- Desislava Tenekedjieva - Maria Salviati de Medici
- Sandra Ceccarelli - Nobildonna di Mantova
- Franco Andreani - Ambasciatore di Carlo V

== Awards ==
- 9 David di Donatello Awards (Best Film - Best Director: Ermanno Olmi - Best Screenplay: Ermanno Olmi - Best Producer: Luigi Musini, Roberto Cicutto and Ermanno Olmi - Best Production Design: Luigi Marchione - Best Cinematography: Fabio Olmi - Best Costume Design: Francesca Sartori - Best Editing: Paolo Cottignola - Best Music: Fabio Vacchi)
- 3 Nastro d'Argento Prizes (Best Production Design: Luigi Marchione - Best Cinematography: Fabio Olmi - Best Costume Design: Francesca Sartori)
- Palme d'Or (nominated) - 2001 Cannes Film Festival
