= Babak Payami =

Iranian film director

- بابک پیامی
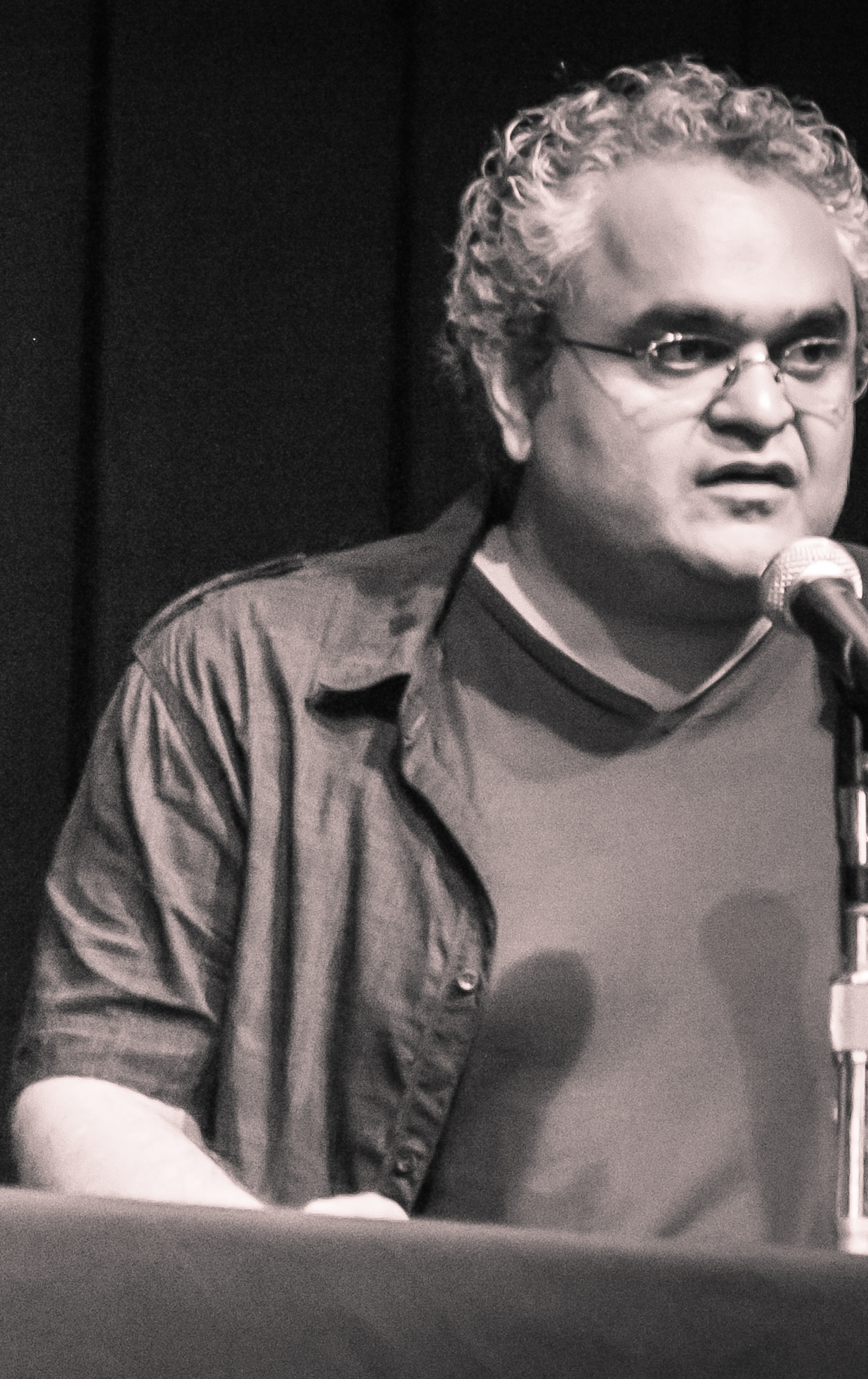
- Born: Tehran, Iran
- Occupations: Film director, writer, producer

Babak Payami (Persian: بابک پیامی; born 1966) is an Iranian-Canadian film director, screenwriter and producer. He won the Silver Lion for Best Director, at the 2001 Venice Film Festival for Secret Ballot. His films also include One More Day, Silence Between Two Thoughts, Iqbal: A Tale of a Fearless Child, Manhattan Undying and the documentary 752 Is Not a Number.

== Biography ==
Payami was born in Tehran in 1966 and spent part of his childhood in Afghanistan. He later moved to Canada and became a Canadian citizen. In the early 1990s, he studied cinema at the University of Toronto.

Payami returned to Iran in 1998 and made his first feature film, One More Day. The film was presented in the Panorama programme of the 2000 Berlin International Film Festival. It received the Best Artistic Contribution Award at the 2000 Tokyo International Film Festival and a Jury Special Award at the Torino Film Festival.

His second feature, Secret Ballot, premiered in competition at the 2001 Venice Film Festival. Payami received the Special Director's Award for the film. Secret Ballot also received the NETPAC, OCIC, Pasinetti and UNICEF awards at Venice, as well as recognition at the London, Valladolid, Rotterdam and Newport film festivals.

In 2002, Payami began filming Silence Between Two Thoughts in eastern Iran. During post-production, Iranian authorities arrested him without filing charges and confiscated the film's original negative and sound materials. A version of the film was reconstructed from salvaged digital material and screened at the 2003 Venice Film Festival. Payami left Iran in the summer of 2003 and continued his work in Europe and Canada.

Payami later taught directing at Filmakademie Baden-Württemberg in Ludwigsburg, Germany, and conducted filmmaking workshops in Europe and Canada. From late 2007 until January 2010, he served as creative director of the Media Studio at Fabrica, the communications research centre established by Benetton. During the 2010s, he served as artistic director and later senior artistic advisor to Toronto's Tirgan Festival.

In 2015, Payami co-directed the French-Italian animated feature Iqbal: A Tale of a Fearless Child with Michel Fuzellier. He subsequently directed and co-produced the Canadian feature Manhattan Undying, released in 2016.

Payami directed, wrote and produced the 2022 documentary 752 Is Not a Number, which follows Hamed Esmaeilion's pursuit of justice after his wife and daughter were killed in the destruction of Ukraine International Airlines Flight 752. The film premiered at the 2022 Toronto International Film Festival and was second runner-up for the festival's People's Choice Documentary Award.

Payami continues to work as a filmmaker and producer in Canada.

== Filmography ==
Year	Title	Role
1993	A Stone Audience	Director
1996	Vernissage	Director
1999	One More Day	Director, writer and producer
2001	Secret Ballot	Director, writer and producer
2003	Silence Between Two Thoughts	Director, writer and producer
2015	Iqbal: A Tale of a Fearless Child	Co-director and co-writer
2016	Manhattan Undying	Director and producer
2022	752 Is Not a Number	Director, writer and producer

== Awards and honors ==
- Best Artistic Contribution Award at the 2000 Tokyo International Film Festival for One More Day.
- Jury Special Award at the 2000 Torino Film Festival for One More Day.
- Directing prize at the 2001 Venice Film Festival for Secret Ballot.
- FIPRESCI recognition at the 2001 BFI London Film Festival for Secret Ballot.
- FIPRESCI Prize at the 2004 Tromsø International Film Festival for Silence Between Two Thoughts.
- Second runner-up for the 2022 TIFF People's Choice Documentary Award for 752 Is Not a Number.

== See also ==
- Iranian cinema
