= Andrea Purgatori =

Italian writer (1953–2023)

- Purgatori in Fascisti su Marte (2006)
- Born: 1 February 1953; Rome, Italy
- Died: 19 July 2023 (aged 70); Rome, Italy
- Occupations: Author; journalist; screenwriter; actor; television presenter
- Height: 1.78 m (5 ft 10 in)
- Spouse: Nicola Schmitz (m. 1992, divorced)
- Partner: Errica Dall'Ara

Andrea Purgatori (1 February 1953 – 19 July 2023) was an Italian journalist, writer, screenwriter, television presenter and occasional actor.

== Life and career ==
Born in Rome, in 1974 Purgatori started his career as a journalist, and in 1976 he began a long collaboration with the newspaper Corriere della Sera, in which he served as an investigative journalist and a war correspondent. He later collaborated with other publications, including Le Monde diplomatique, The Huffington Post, Vanity Fair and L'Unità.

As a screenwriter Purgatori's credits include several Marco Risi's films, notably The Rubber Wall (1991), based on his own investigation about the Ustica affair, and Fort Apache Napoli (2010), about the murder of journalist Giancarlo Siani, as well as films by Giuliano Montaldo, Michele Placido, Carlo Verdone, Alessandro Di Robilant. He was also an occasional actor, mainly in projects involving comedian Corrado Guzzanti, with whom he also collaborated as a writer in a number of television and stage projects. In 2001, he received the prize "Archivio Disarmo - Golden Doves for Peace" from IRIAD.

From 2017, Purgatori wrote and hosted the program Atlantide on La7; in 2019, the program was awarded the Flaiano Prize for best cultural television show. In 2022, he appeared prominently in the Netflix documentary series Vatican Girl: The Disappearance of Emanuela Orlandi. He was also an essayist, and in 2019 he made his debut as a novelist with Quattro piccole ostriche.

An environmental activist, Purgatori served as president of the Italian branch of Greenpeace from 2014 to 2020. He died in Rome, on 19 July 2023, at the age of 70. Purgatori was the father of the actor Edoardo Purgatori and was a fan of the Serie A club A.S. Roma.

He considered himself a "dubious believer".

=== Death ===
Purgatori died at the age of 70 on 19 July 2023, two months after being diagnosed with a serious form of brain cancer. The day after his death, to ascertain the appropriateness of the treatment the journalist had been subjected to, his family filed a complaint with the Rome Public Prosecutor's Office, which opened an investigation for culpable homicide against the doctors. The post-mortem carried out the following September confirmed the absence of metastases in the brain at the time of death. and an expert report ordered by the prosecutor's office in April 2024 traced the causes of death back to unrecognized infective endocarditis, for which antibiotics would have sufficed instead of the radiotherapy he was subjected to. In March 2025, a request was made to send four doctors — a cardiologist, a radiologist, and two of his assistants — to trial on charges of manslaughter.

== Filmography ==
=== Screenwriting credits ===
Year	Title	Notes
1987	Specters	
1989	Maya	
1990	Panama Sugar	
1991	The Rubber Wall	
1992	Nel continente nero	
1994	Law of Courage	
1995	State Secret	
1998	Last Cut	
1998	Vite blindate	Television film
1999	Fine secolo	Miniseries
2000	Sospetti	TV series (season 1)
2001	L'attentatumi	
2003–2010	Un caso di coscienza	TV series (co-writer)
2006	Il fantasma di Corleone	
2006	Attacco allo Stato	Television film
2006	Fratelli	Television film
2006–2007	Nati ieri	TV series (co-writer)
2008	Caravaggio	Television film
2008	Il bambino della domenica	Television film
2010	Angel of Evil	
2011	The Entrepreneur	
2012	Inspector Nardone	TV series
2013	Cha cha cha	
2015	Ragion di Stato	Television film
2016	Lampedusa - Dall'orizzonte in poi	Miniseries
2022	Vatican Girl: La scomparsa di Manuela Orlandi	Docuseries

=== Acting roles ===
Year	Title	Role(s)	Notes
1991	The Rubber Wall	Journalist	Cameo appearance
2001	Three Wives	Beatrice's friend	Cameo appearance
2006	Fascisti su Marte	Fecchia	
2008, 2022	Boris	Lawyer Kalemzuck	TV series (4 episodes)
2010	Due vite per caso	Lawyer	Cameo appearance
2012	A Flat for Three	Claudio Romeres	
2016	Ears	Otolaryngologist	
2016	The Big Score	Theatre man	Cameo appearance
2017	1993	Niccolò Pizzetti	TV series (3 episodes)
2018	Just Believe	Rabbi	
2022	Vatican Girl: La scomparsa di Manuela Orlandi	Himself	Docuseries
2022	The Bad Guy	Himself	TV series (episode "Pilot")
2024	Flaminia	Mr. De Rotier	
