= Lillo & Greg =

Italian comedy duo

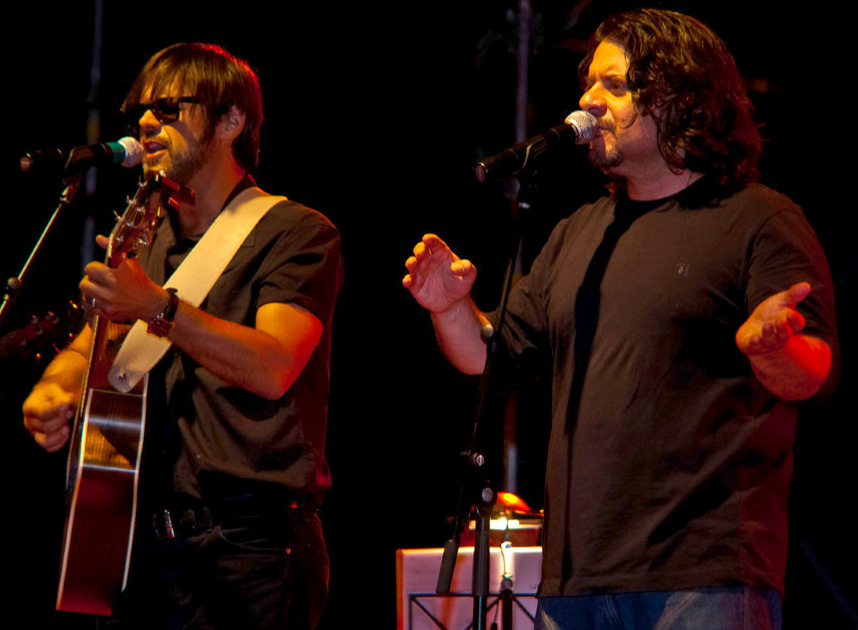
- Lillo (right) & Greg (left) in Terni, (2010)

Background information
- Origin: Rome, Italy
- Occupations: Musicians, comedy duo

Lillo & Greg are an Italian comedy duo consisting of Pasquale Petrolo (born 1962) and Claudio Gregori (born 1963), active in theatre, film, television and radio, as well as musicians, writers and cartoonists.

== Life and career ==
Petrolo and Gregori first met in 1986, when they both worked as cartoonists for the same publishing house, ACME (Petrolo as author of Zio Tibia, realized together with Michelangelo La Neve, while Gregori for I sottotitolati). When in 1991 the publishing house failed, the two decided to engage in new projects, most notably the creation of a comedy rock group, Latte & i Suoi Derivati ("Milk & Its Derivatives"). Active in television, radio, on stage and in films, they are among the creators of the TV-program Le Iene, and since 2003 they are authors and hosts of the program 610 - Sei uno zero on Radio 2.

The duo made their film debut in Giorgio Panariello's Bagnomaria (1999), in which they played two "men in black", and appeared as leading actors in Enrico Caria's comedy Blek Giek (2001). They later starred in Lillo e Greg: The Movie! (2007), a compilation of comedy sketches, before appearing as protagonists in Colpi di fulmine (2012) and Colpi di fortuna (2013). They also starred in three Christmas comedies directed by Volfango De Biasi: Un Natale stupefacente (2014), Natale col boss (2015) and Natale a Londra – Dio salvi la regina (2016).

In 2020, Lillo & Greg made their feature film directorial debut with the comedy film D.N.A. - Decisamente non adatti, followed by Gli idoli delle donne in 2022, which they co-directed with Eros Puglielli.

== Filmography ==
- Bagnomaria (1999)
- Blek Giek (2001)
- Lillo e Greg: The Movie! (2007)
- Colpi di fulmine (2012)
- Colpi di fortuna (2013)
- Un Natale stupefacente (2014)
- Natale col Boss (2015)
- Natale a Londra – Dio salvi la regina (2016)
- D.N.A. – Decisamente non adatti (2020)
- Gli idoli delle donne (2022)
