= Normalman (TV series) =

- Genre: Comedy
- Created by: Lillo
- Directed by: Vincenzo Taglialatela
- Starring: Lillo; Greg
- Country of origin: Italy
- Original language: Italian
- No. of seasons: 2

Production
- Production location: Rome
- Running time: approx. 7 mins per episode

NormalMan is an Italian radio and television series started in 2006. It became famous to the general public by comedians Lillo & Greg in their radio program "610 (sei uno zero)", broadcast on Rai Radio 2 from 2004. In 2006 it lands on television on satellite channel GXT enough to make a second season in 2007. It came available on K2 television channel in late 2009. It is starred by a character created for comics by Lillo in 1991.

== Cast ==
- Lillo, as Piermaria Carletti (NormalMan)
- Greg, as most of the enemies
- Virginia Raffaele, as various characters (mainly Mrs. Cassani)
- Chiara Sani, as various characters
- Simone Colombari, as various characters
- Valentina Paoletti, as various characters
- Viola Capitani, as various characters

== Secondary characters ==
- Amnesy
- L'attore cane
- Una barista mora
- La famiglia Bocci
- Il Cafone
- La signora Cassani
- Il fumatore
- Fiatella
- L'indicatore
- Una intrigante donzella
- Il nerd
- Petoman
- Il rivelatore
- Il rockettaro
- La signora delle pulizie
- Il venditore
- Il vigile urbano infame
- Zizzania
