= List of Italian films of 2016 =

This is a list of Italian films first released in 2016 (see 2016 in film).

Title	Director	Cast	Genre
2016
7 minutes	Michele Placido	Ottavia Piccolo, Cristiana Capotondi, Ambra Angiolini, Fiorella Mannoia	Drama
Assolo	Laura Morante	Laura Morante, Francesco Pannofino, Gigio Alberti	Comedy
The Correspondence	Giuseppe Tornatore	Jeremy Irons, Olga Kurylenko	Drama
Fiore	Claudio Giovannesi	Daphne Scoccia, Valerio Mastandrea	Drama
Fire at Sea	Gianfranco Rosi	Pietro Bartolo	Documentary drama
Forever Young	Fausto Brizzi	Fabrizio Bentivoglio, Sabrina Ferilli	Comedy
Infernet	Giuseppe Ferlito	Roberto Farnesi, Remo Girone, Ricky Tognazzi	Drama
Italian Race	Matteo Rovere	Stefano Accorsi, Matilda De Angelis	Sports, action
L'abbiamo fatta grossa	Carlo Verdone	Carlo Verdone, Antonio Albanese	Comedy
Like Crazy	Paolo Virzì	Valeria Bruni Tedeschi, Micaela Ramazzotti	Comedy-drama
Perfect Strangers	Paolo Genovese	Marco Giallini, Valerio Mastandrea, Anna Foglietta	Comedy
Pericle	Stefano Mordini	Riccardo Scamarcio, Marina Foïs	Crime
Quo Vado?	Gennaro Nunziante	Checco Zalone, Sonia Bergamasco	Comedy
Sweet Dreams	Marco Bellocchio	Bérénice Bejo, Valerio Mastandrea, Fabrizio Gifuni	Drama
Tommaso	Kim Rossi Stuart	Kim Rossi Stuart, Cristiana Capotondi, Jasmine Trinca	Comedy-drama
Botticelli Inferno	Ralph Loop		Documentary
