= Colpi di fortuna =

- Film poster
- Directed by: Neri Parenti
- Written by: Neri Parenti; Alessandro Bencivenni; Domenico Saverni; Volfango De Biasi
- Produced by: Aurelio De Laurentiis; Luigi De Laurentiis
- Starring: Christian De Sica; Lillo Petrolo; Claudio Gregori; Luca Bizzarri; Paolo Kessisoglu; Francesco Mandelli
- Cinematography: Tani Canevari
- Edited by: Claudio Di Mauro
- Music by: Claudio Gregori; Attilio Di Giovanni
- Release date: 19 December 2013
- Running time: 100 minutes
- Country: Italy
- Language: Italian

Colpi di fortuna (lit. 'Lucky breaks') is a 2013 Italian comedy film directed by Neri Parenti.

== Cast ==
- Christian De Sica as Gabriele Brunelli
- Lillo Petrolo as Felice Mammola
- Claudio Gregori as Walter Biffi
- Luca Bizzarri as Mario
- Paolo Kessisoglu as Piero
- Francesco Mandelli as Bernardo Fossa
- Fatima Trotta as Barbara
- Barbara Folchitto as Felice's wife
- Haruhiko Yamanouchi as Arrambator
- Taiyo Yamanouchi as the Mongolian interpreter
- Marek Hamšík as himself
- Rafael Benítez as himself
- Lorenzo Insigne as himself
- Christian Maggio as himself
- Juan Camilo Zúñiga as himself
- Gökhan Inler as himself
- Pepe Reina as himself
- Raffaella Carrà as herself
