= No Place to Be Single =

- Directed by: Laura Chiossone
- Screenplay by: Alessandra Martellini; Giulia Magda Martinez; Chiara Menichetti; Matteo Visconti
- Starring: Matilde Gioli; Cristiano Caccamo
- Cinematography: Valerio Evangelista
- Edited by: Luciana Pandolfelli
- Music by: Ratchev & Carratello
- Distributed by: Amazon Prime Video
- Release date: 8 May 2026
- Language: Italian

No Place to Be Single (Italian: Non è un paese per single) is a 2026 Italian romantic comedy film directed by Laura Chiossone and starring Matilde Gioli and Cristiano Caccamo. The film is based on the novel with the same name by Felicia Kingsley.

Single mother Elisa, who helps manage and lives on the Tuscany family estate Le Giuggiole, life changes when her childhood friend Michele and brother Carlo inherit the property. They work through family conflicts and misunderstandings, reconnect and eventually fall in love.

It was released on Amazon Prime Video on 8 May 2026.

== Plot ==
Michele is a Milano womanizer and a successful real estate broker. He and his younger brother are orphans and live together in a luxurious apartment. Michele works at the same company where their late brother Giorgio shone. As the CEO plans to retire, he is considering Michele as replacement. His first choice would have been Giorgio, so Michele must satisfy a client who aspires to build a golf club, or he will be fired.

The brothers discover their uncle Alfonso has died. The 90-year-old count owned the farming business Le Giuggiole in Belvedere, a small provincial village in Tuscany. Giorgio, Carlo, and Michele spent their summers there when younger.

Michele and Carlo go to Belvedere for the count’s funeral. They are his only known surviving relatives. As he was in debt, the bank seized the villa, so they stand to inherit the land and farmhouse, in which Elisa, her daughter Linda, sister Giada and mother live. The count allowed the family to live there to work the land. Elisa and Giada have known Michele and Carlo since childhood.

Elisa takes care of the olive trees, jujubes and vineyard. As she insists on working alone without hiring farm workers, the business is going bankrupt. Elisa is a single mother, whose daughter is a teen, the result of a brief encounter.

For Michele, his uncle’s death is providential, he wants to offer the land to the golf club client. He tries to hide this from Elisa and her family, but she inadvertently finds out. Since Carlo has a weakness for Giada, she asks her sister to befriend him in order to bring him to their side.

In the meantime they host the two brothers in the farmhouse. Giada reminds Elisa the secret she has kept hidden for so long could be used to their advantage. However, Elisa for some reason refuses to do so.

Not wanting to have any more secrets with Elisa after having made love with her, Michele discloses the imminent sale of the land and promises her a share. However, he discovers Elisa knew all along, does not care about the money and loves the farmhouse and the work.

Carlo, in love with Giada, refuses to sell as he does not want her to lose her home. Michele reveals the affair between Giada and Ettore, which he had learned about while in town. Carlo gets this confirmed when Ettore shows up to see Giada at the farmhouse, embarrassing her in front of him.

Once again, Giada tries to convince her sister to reveal her long-hidden secret, believing it to be the only way to avoid the sale. Their mother is confused, not understanding what her daughters are referring to. At that point, Elisa admits that Giorgio was Linda's father. The story she told of an Australian guy was a lie, but Linda overhears everything.

Beside herself with rage, Linda then reveals to Michele that she is his niece. As she too is one of Count Alfonso's heirs, she has the right to vote. So, Linda decides to support Michele, simply to spite her mother.

Linda impulsively loses her virginity to Paolo, the guy she has been dating. She immediately regrets it when he excuses himself to leave directly after. Linda reveals it to her mother to provoke her.

Elisa, in Michele's presence, harshly rebukes Paolo for his behavior, so much so that Michele realizes that she is mostly projecting her anger at Giorgio onto him. He has always idolized his late brother, but now discovers his true nature. Giorgio seduced Elisa with false promises of love, but after impregnating her, he abandoned her.

Elisa finally begins to manage the farm more seriously, hiring farmhands. As Michele is no longer employed, he will soon be leaving Belvedere. However, Elisa asks him to stay. Although she has yet to figure out her feelings for him, which scares her, Michele is the first person she has ever felt she cannot live without. So he decides to stay, and they kiss passionately.

== Cast ==
- Matilde Gioli as Elisa
- Cristiano Caccamo as Michele
- Amanda Campana as Giada
- Sebastiano Pigazzi as Carlo
- Cecilia Dazzi as Mariana
- Margherita Rebeggiani as Linda
- Pietro Resta as Don Italo
- Elisa Proietti as Caterina
- Francesco Turbanti as Duccio
- Fiorenza D'Antonio as Rosa
- Edoardo Pagliai as Simone
- Marco Cocci as Ettore
- Daniel McVicar as Constantine
- Bebo Storti as Dr. Galli
