= Modalità aereo =

2019 Italian comedy film

- Film poster
- Directed by: Fausto Brizzi
- Written by: Fausto Brizzi; Paolo Ruffini; Herbert Simone Paragnani
- Produced by: Luca Barbareschi
- Starring: Lillo Petrolo; Paolo Ruffini; Violante Placido; Dino Abbrescia; Caterina Guzzanti
- Cinematography: Marcello Montarsi
- Edited by: Luciana Pandolfelli
- Music by: Bruno Zambrini
- Release date: 21 February 2019 (Italy)
- Running time: 100 minutes
- Country: Italy
- Language: Italian

Modalità aereo (lit. 'Airplane mode') is a 2019 Italian comedy film directed by Fausto Brizzi.

== Cast ==
- Lillo Petrolo as Ivano De Sanctis
- Paolo Ruffini as Diego Gardini
- Violante Placido as Linda
- Dino Abbrescia as Sabino Lorusso
- Caterina Guzzanti as Maria
- Luca Vecchi as Lorenzo Moretti
- Sabrina Salerno as herself
- Veronika Logan as Veronica Bartolini
- Christian Monaldi as Luca Gardini
