= Ilaria Spada =

Italian actress (born 1981)

- Born: 27 February 1981 (age 45); Latina, Lazio, Italy
- Occupation: Actress
- Years active: 2000–present
- Spouse: Kim Rossi Stuart (m. 2019)
- Children: 3

Ilaria Spada (born 27 February 1981) is an Italian actress, born in the Agro Pontino district to an Italian father and a Sicilian-Tunisian mother.

Spada participated as anchorwoman in Zecchino d'oro on Rai 1 and Libero on Rai 2, and appeared on a cover of the weekly magazine Panorama.

At the end of 2006, Spada portrayed a firefighter on the Canale 5 series Codice Rosso.

Since April 2007, Spada has been a protagonist in the Rai 1 series Provaci ancora prof!.

== Filmography ==
=== Film ===
| Year | Title | Role(s) | Notes |
|---|---|---|---|
| 2000 | Via del Corso | Raffaella | |
| 2008 | Scusa ma ti chiamo amore | Alessia | |
| 2008 | This Night Is Still Ours | Maria | |
| 2011 | Come trovare nel modo giusto l'uomo sbagliato | Myriam | |
| 2014 | A Fairy-Tale Wedding | Sara Farinacci | |
| 2014 | Arance & Martello | Amanda | |
| 2015 | God Willing | Bianca De Luca | |
| 2015 | Tutte lo vogliono | Francesca Petrini | |
| 2015 | The Last Will Be the Last | Simona | |
| 2015 | Vacanze ai Caraibi | Claudia | |
| 2019 | Tutta un'altra vita | Lola | |
| 2021 | Help! My In-Laws Are Vampires! | Stella | |
| 2021 | Notti in bianco, baci a colazione | Paola Barbato | |
| 2022 | Gli idole delle donne | Maria | |
| 2022 | Ritorno al presente | Claudia | |
| 2022 | Brado | Renato's Friend | |
| 2023 | A Freaking Wedding! | Stella / Sole | |
| 2023 | In fuga con Babbo Natale | Chicca | |
| 2025 | Poveri noi | Giovanna Mariani | |
| 2025 | Five Seconds | Letizia | |
| 2026 | Agata Christian – Delitto sulle nevi | Laura | |

=== Television ===
| Year | Title | Role(s) | Notes |
|---|---|---|---|
| 1998 | Miss Italia 1998 | Herself / Contestant | Annual beauty contest |
| 2002 | Veline | Herself / Contestant | Reality competition (season 1) |
| 2002 | Zecchino d'Oro | Herself / Co-host | Children's singing competition (45th edition) |
| 2003 | Ciao Darwin | Herself / Dancer | Variety game show (season 4) |
| 2005 | Un ciclone in famiglia | Aquagym Instructor | Episode: "Seconda puntata" |
| 2006 | Codice rosso | Stella Sandri | Main role |
| 2006–2007 | Nati ieri | Arianna Boni | Recurring role |
| 2007 | Camera Café | Marta | Episode: "La selezione" |
| 2007–2008 | Provaci ancora prof! | Michela Ferrari | Main role (seasons 2-3) |
| 2008 | Raccontami | Sophia | Recurring role (season 2) |
| 2008–2009 | Don Matteo | Amanda Patriarchi | Recurring role (seasons 6-7) |
| 2010 | R.I.S. Roma – Delitti imperfetti | Milena Spano | 4 episodes |
| 2011 | Cenerentola | Tina Martone | Two-parts television movie |
| 2015 | La dama velata | La Serpier | 3 episodes |
| 2018 | The Immature: The Series | Claudia Russo | Recurring role |
| 2019 | Che Dio ci aiuti | Teodora | Recurring role (season 5) |
| 2020 | Doc – Nelle tue mani | Serena Ruffo | Episode: "Egoismi" |
