= A Freaking Wedding! =

2023 fantasy comedy horror film directed by Volfango De Biasi

- Italian: Un matrimonio mostruoso
- Directed by: Volfango De Biasi
- Written by: Michela Andreozzi; Alessandro Bencivenni; Filippo Bologna; Volfango De Biasi
- Produced by: Federica Lucisano; Fulvio Lucisano
- Starring: Massimo Ghini; Paola Minaccioni; Ilaria Spada; Ricky Memphis; Cristiano Caccamo; Emanuela Rei; Maurizio Mattioli; Elisa Di Eusanio; Claudio Gregori; Paolo Calabresi
- Cinematography: Roberto Forza
- Edited by: Stefano Chierchiè
- Music by: Michele Braga
- Production companies: Italian International Film; Rai Cinema
- Distributed by: 01 Distribution
- Release date: 21 June 2023 (Italy)
- Running time: 101 minutes
- Country: Italy
- Language: Italian

A Freaking Wedding! (Italian: Un matrimonio mostruoso) is a 2023 Italian fantasy comedy horror film directed by Volfango De Biasi. It is the sequel to the 2021 film Help! My In-Laws Are Vampires!.

== Cast ==
- Massimo Ghini as Vladimiro
- Paola Minaccioni as Brunilde
- Ilaria Spada as Stella / Sole
- Ricky Memphis as Remo
- Cristiano Caccamo as Adalberto
- Emanuela Rei as Luna / Luana
- Maurizio Mattioli as Glauco
- Elisa Di Eusanio as Monia
- Claudio Gregori as Dr. Frankenstein
- Paolo Calabresi as Nanni / Isadora
- Sara Ciocca as Salmetta
- Vincenzo Sebastiani as Ivano
- Mattia Lucentini as Hugo
- Irene Girotti as the elf

== Release ==
The film was released theatrically in Italy on 21 June 2023, distributed by 01 Distribution.
