= Un Natale stupefacente =

Un Natale Stupefacente
- Directed by: Volfango De Biasi
- Written by: Alessandro Bencivenni; Volfango De Biasi; Francesco Marioni; Gabriele Pignotta; Domenico Saverni
- Produced by: Aurelio De Laurentiis
- Starring: Lillo & Greg; Ambra Angiolini; Paola Minaccioni; Paolo Calabresi; Niccolò Calvagna; Francesco Montanari; Riccardo De Filippis
- Cinematography: Giovanni Canevari
- Music by: Claudio Gregori; Attilio Di Giovanni; Michele Braga
- Release date: December 18, 2014
- Running time: 100 minutes
- Country: Italy
- Language: Italian
- Box office: $7,015,989

Un Natale stupefacente is a 2014 Italian Christmas comedy film written and directed by Volfango De Biasi. It grossed $7,015,989 at the Italian box office.

== Plot ==
Lillo and Greg are two brothers who have to look after their little nephew during the Christmas holidays, since the child's parents were arrested for cultivation of marijuana.

== Cast ==
- Lillo as Remo
- Greg as Oscar
- Ambra Angiolini as Genny
- Paola Minaccioni as Marisa
- Paolo Calabresi as Giustino
- Niccolò Calvagna as Matteo
- Francesco Montanari as Belotti
- Riccardo De Filippis as Randelli
- Giampiero Ingrassia as Pietro Corradi

== See also ==
- List of Christmas films
