= Emanuela Rei =

Italian actress and singer (born 1991)

- Born: February 26, 1991 (age 35); Rome, Italy
- Occupations: Actress, singer
- Years active: 2004–present
- Known for: Maggie & Bianca: Fashion Friends

Emanuela Rei (born 26 February 1991) is an Italian actress and singer. She is best known for portraying Maggie Davis in Maggie & Bianca: Fashion Friends and Jasmine in Aladin - Il musical geniale.

== Biography ==
Rei was born on 26 February 1991, in Rome. She started studying acting at a young age, and her first professional role was in a 2010 episode of the television series, I Cesaroni.

Following this, Emanuela Rei played the part of Alex in eBand in 2012. In 2012 to 2013, she appeared as Greta Gironi in Talent High School - Il Sogno di Sofia. In 2013 and 2014, she played Emma in Anastasia <3 Dance.

In 2016 and 2017, Rei starred as Maggie Davis in Maggie & Bianca: Fashion Friends.

== Filmography ==
Cinema
Year	Title	Role	Notes
2021	Help! My In-Laws Are Vampires!	Luna	
2023	A Freaking Wedding!	Luna	

Television
Year	Title	Role	Notes
2010	I Cesaroni	Chiara	Guest role; 1 episode
2010	Sketch Up	The Pharmacist	Recurring role; 18 episodes
2012	eBand	Alex	Main role; 26 episodes
2012–2013	Talent High School - Il sogno di Sofia	Greta Gironi	Main role; 48 episodes
2013–2014	Anastasia <3 Dance	Emma	Main role; 12 episodes
2016–2017	Maggie & Bianca: Fashion Friends	Maggie Davis	Lead role; 78 episodes

Theater
Year	Title	Role	Notes
2004	Gianni Schicchi		
2005	Filosoficamente		
2006	Noi per voi		
2015	QuiProQuo		
2019	Aladin - Il musical geniale	Jasmine	Lead role
