= Fascisti su Marte =

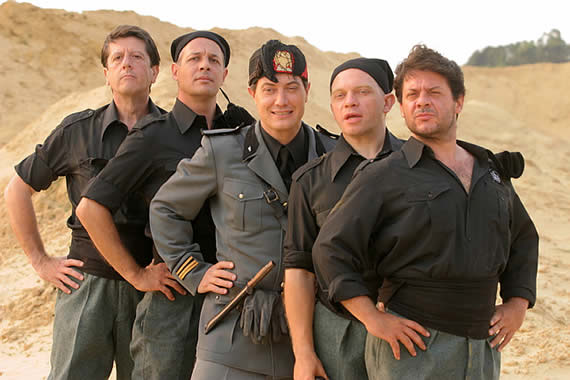
- Directed by: Corrado Guzzanti and Igor Skofic
- Written by: Corrado Guzzanti
- Screenplay by: Corrado Guzzanti, Paola Cannatello
- Produced by: Simona Banchi
- Narrated by: Corrado Guzzanti
- Cinematography: Corrado Guzzanti, Igor Skofic
- Edited by: Cristiano Travaglioli
- Music by: Corrado Guzzanti, Nicola Piovani
- Production companies: Fandango, Studio Uno, Kipli Entertainment
- Distributed by: Fandango
- Release date: 27 October 2006
- Running time: 100 minutes
- Country: Italy
- Language: Italian
- Budget: € 1,000,000
- Box office: € 885,707

Fascisti su Marte (Fascists on Mars) is a 2006 Italian film, directed by Corrado Guzzanti and Igor Skofic.

Based on the sketches made by Corrado Guzzanti as part of the TV program Il caso Scafroglia (2002), this movie is a uchronia, a “satirical exercise” in historical scifi-revisionism, filmed as a pseudo-documentary and parodying the style of the Istituto Luce newsreels during the Italian Fascist regime.

The film was presented at the 2006 Rome International Film Festival, and in 2007 it was nominated for a David di Donatello for Best Original Song.

== Background ==
Originating in 2002 as a comic strip within the Rai 3 television program, Il caso Scafroglia, the following year Fascisti su Marte became a 45 minutes featurette, being screened in this form in the New Territories section at the 60th Venice International Film Festival. Finally it was turned into a feature film in 2006 thanks to the addition of new sequences especially shot.

Thus edited, the film was presented in the Extra section during Cinema. Festa internazionale di Roma 2006, and was released in Italian theaters the following October.

== Plot ==
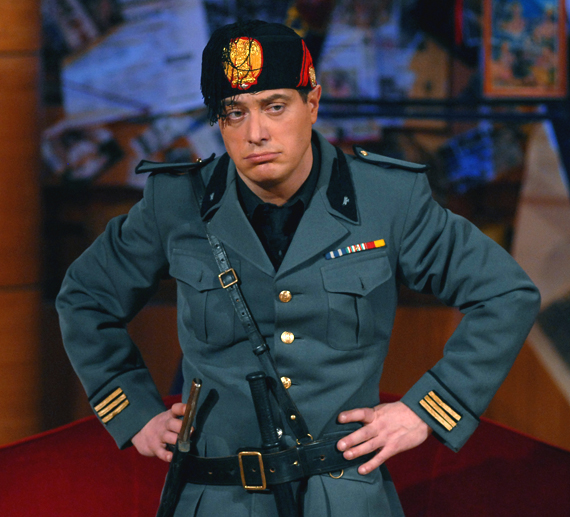
Corrado Guzzanti as Gerarca Gaetano Maria Barbagli

In 1938, a handful of blackshirts, commanded by gerarca Gaetano Maria Barbagli, embarked on the prototype German space rocket Repentaglia IV, built with the help of physicist Ettore Majorana, and set out to conquer Mars, the “red Bolshevik and traitorous planet.”

Arriving at their destination after a meteorite impact at 3 p.m. on 10 May 1939, the men set out to explore the planet, solving the first major problem, the rarefaction of the atmosphere, with a simple order from Barbagli: “Breathe!” After planting the flag and setting up camp, the problem of food and other supplies arises. There is no water on the planet, and while searching for it, the four underlings come to mistake a spit from the gerarca as a sign of its presence. While searching the rocket's cargo hold, the handful discovers a clandestine Balilla, named Bruno Caorso, thirty-seven years old and declared retarded, on board. He outrages the bust of the Duce and, fleeing from the firing squad, comes across a strange rock; believing it to be an animate being, he returns to the camp terrified and recounts having encountered Martians, swearing that he heard them say the word “mimimmi.”

The fascists then, considering the stones to be sentient beings (“mimics”), begin a brief campaign for the planet's subjugation and, after concluding it, declare Mars as “fascist territory,” and begin organizing the planet's domination. Food, however, is scarce, and the lack of supplies, coupled with the accidental destruction of the spaceship with a balloon shot, leads the underlings to mutiny against the commander during a meteor shower mistaken for an attack by partisan mimics. Barbagli, however, breaks free and engages in combat against the mutineers; in the course of the battle an UFO suddenly lands, which turns out to be piloted by a group of alien Amazons. These conduct research on the planet, heedless of the human presence, and indeed offer the hapless comrades, in the meantime reacquainted, food and water; Barbagli refuses outside help and tries in every way to show the visitors the power of “Mars Littorio,” exasperating the Amazon leader to such an extent that the latter decides to offer them a ride to Earth.

The gerarca does everything he can to stop his subordinates from leaving, but he is unable to stop them and finds himself alone on the red planet, powerless and doomed to certain death. The adventurous journey of these men soon falls into oblivion due to the events of World War II, and at the end of the conflict no one has any interest in remembering this work of conquest; only fifty-eight years later, in 1996, during the Mars Pathfinder mission, the Sojourner rover discovers what remains of Barbagli's skeleton.

== Cast ==
- Corrado Guzzanti as Gerarca Gaetano Maria Barbagli
- Andrea Purgatori as Fecchia
- Pasquale Petrolo as Pini
- Marco Marzocca as Freghieri
- Andrea Blarziono as Santodio
- Andrea Salerno as Balilla Bruno Caorso
- Irene Ferri: as Amazon leader
- Caterina Guzzanti: as Amazon
- Simona Banchi: as Fascist Virgin Mary
- Paola Minaccioni: as Fascist Befana

== Production ==
Nicola Piovani also participated in the making of the film for the musical part: the film includes numerous period songs, as well as original parody compositions and a melodrama version of the program's theme song (Sopra un prototipo, featured on the home video edition as Fascisti su Marte Esistenzialista).

The film features unreleased parts that fit, from the beginning, between scenes already shot; these include the addition of the “regime cartoon” Il silicio sanctionista, Istituto Luce-style theme songs and a finale in which Caterina Guzzanti and Irene Ferri also appear.

The filming took place in a quarry in Magliana.

== Historical references ==
The film freely cites numerous sources, from Benito Mussolini's speeches to classic films such as Schindler's List (in one scene mimics are framed behind barbed wire, all in black and white except for one red one), The Mission, 2001: A Space Odyssey (at the end in the monolith scene) and The Great Dictator (when Barbagli dribbles and plays with an inflatable Mars), and adds a second level of reading to it, namely a satire of Italian customs and politics of the period, particularly the Second Berlusconi government. There are also many allusions in an ironic vein to the characteristics of the fascist regime and the typical discriminations of fascism, such as in the scene in which Barbagli sees four tender Teletubbies appear having for antennae respectively the Star of David, the symbol of gender equality, hammer and sickle and the peace symbol, and shoots them down with a rifle.

During the bingo scene, the numbers 25 7 43, 8 9 43, and 25 4 45 come out in sequence: a clear reference to the events that marked the fall of fascism, referring respectively to the dates of the no-confidence agenda to Mussolini, the armistice of Cassabile with the Allies and the liberation of Milan and Genoa.

== Reception ==
The film was released in Italy on 27 October 2006 (74th anniversary of the March on Rome), grossing 885,707 euros in Italian theaters.

== See also ==
- Iron Sky
