= Natale col Boss =

- Directed by: Volfango De Biasi
- Written by: Volfango De Biasi; Alessandro Bencivenni; Francesco Marioni; Tiziana Martini; Lillo & Greg
- Produced by: Aurelio De Laurentiis
- Starring: Lillo & Greg; Paolo Ruffini
- Cinematography: Gianluca Mercedi
- Music by: Claudio Gregori; Attilio Di Giovanni
- Release date: December 16, 2015
- Running time: 96 minutes
- Language: Italian

Natale col Boss ("Christmas with the Boss") is a 2015 Italian crime comedy film written and directed by Volfango De Biasi. It grossed $8,528,805 at the Italian box office.

== Plot ==
In Naples, a mafia boss realizes that his cover is blown, and that the police know his face. So he calls Lillo & Greg surgeons to help him change his face and to look like Leonardo DiCaprio. But the two surgeons misunderstand, and turn him into Peppino Di Capri! Meanwhile, two bungling policemen are put on the boss' tracks, but the exchange with the real Peppino Di Capri, on tour in Naples for a concert!

== Cast ==
- Lillo as Alex
- Greg as Dino
- Paolo Ruffini as Cosimo
- Francesco Mandelli as Leo / Mamma Santissima
- Giulia Bevilacqua as Sara
- Peppino di Capri as Boss Salvatore Fontebasso aka Scavafosse / Himself
- Enrico Guarneri as Police Commissioner Zaganetti
- Giovanni Esposito as Mamma Santissima's Nephew
- Michela Andreozzi as Azzurra
- Francesco Di Leva as Fefè
- Francesco Pennasilico as Mario
- Antonio Pennarella as Scassacapa
- Gianfelice Imparato as the blid informer
- Antonella Clerici as Mr. Tappabuco
- Gué Pequeno as himself

== See also ==
- List of Christmas films
- List of Italian films of 2015
