= Botticelli Inferno =

2016 documentary

- Film poster
- Directed by: Ralph Loop
- Written by: Ralph Loop
- Distributed by: Nexo Digital, Sky Arts HD, MYmovies.it
- Release date: November 2016
- Running time: 96 minutes
- Countries: Italy; Germany
- Language: German

Botticelli Inferno is a 2016 Italian-German documentary film directed by Ralph Loop. The film is part of the project, Great Art Cinema, and analyses one of the most mysterious works of Sandro Botticelli, the Map of Hell in the Divine Comedy Illustrated by Botticelli in the Vatican Library. The map was originally part of an illustrated manuscript of Dante's Divine Comedy, featuring artwork by Botticcelli.

The film was edited in the facilities of TV Plus, Medea Film, and Nexo Digital. It attempts to shed light on Botticelli's motivation for drawing his Map of Hell, and, in the process, to reveal the dark, and less well -known side of the Renaissance master who is famous for painting The Birth of Venus and Primavera.

== Plot ==
Botticelli had created 102 drawings based on the writings of Dante's Inferno depicting Dante's vision of Hell. One of those drawings, the Map of Hell, shows the suffering of the condemned souls at the various levels of Hell, is analysed by art experts and their conclusions are presented in the film.

When the director of the film, Ralph Loop, saw Botticelli's exhibitions in Berlin and London in 2015, he became so fascinated with the Map of Hell that he decided to make a film about it. In Ron Howard's Inferno, the Map of Hell is shown briefly as a projection on a wall, while Ralph Loop's film is dedicated to examining the map and its history in detail.

The film attempts to shed light on what motivated Botticelli to draw the Map of Hell, and, in doing so, to reveal the dark, and less well known, side of the Renaissance master who is famous for painting The Birth of Venus and Primavera.

The drawing is about 30 by 40 centimetres and in the film it is examined by a glove-wearing German art historian inside the air-conditioned vaults of the Vatican. A letter from Friedrich Lippmann, director of Kupferstichkabinett Berlin, who in 1882 brought 85 of Botticelli's 102 drawings to the museum, is also shown in the film. A high-performance digital scanner is used in the film to reveal details in the map which could not be discerned by the human eye.

== Locales ==
The film was shot on location in the Vatican, the Uffizi Gallery in Florence, the Vatican Library, London, Berlin and Scotland.

== Reception ==
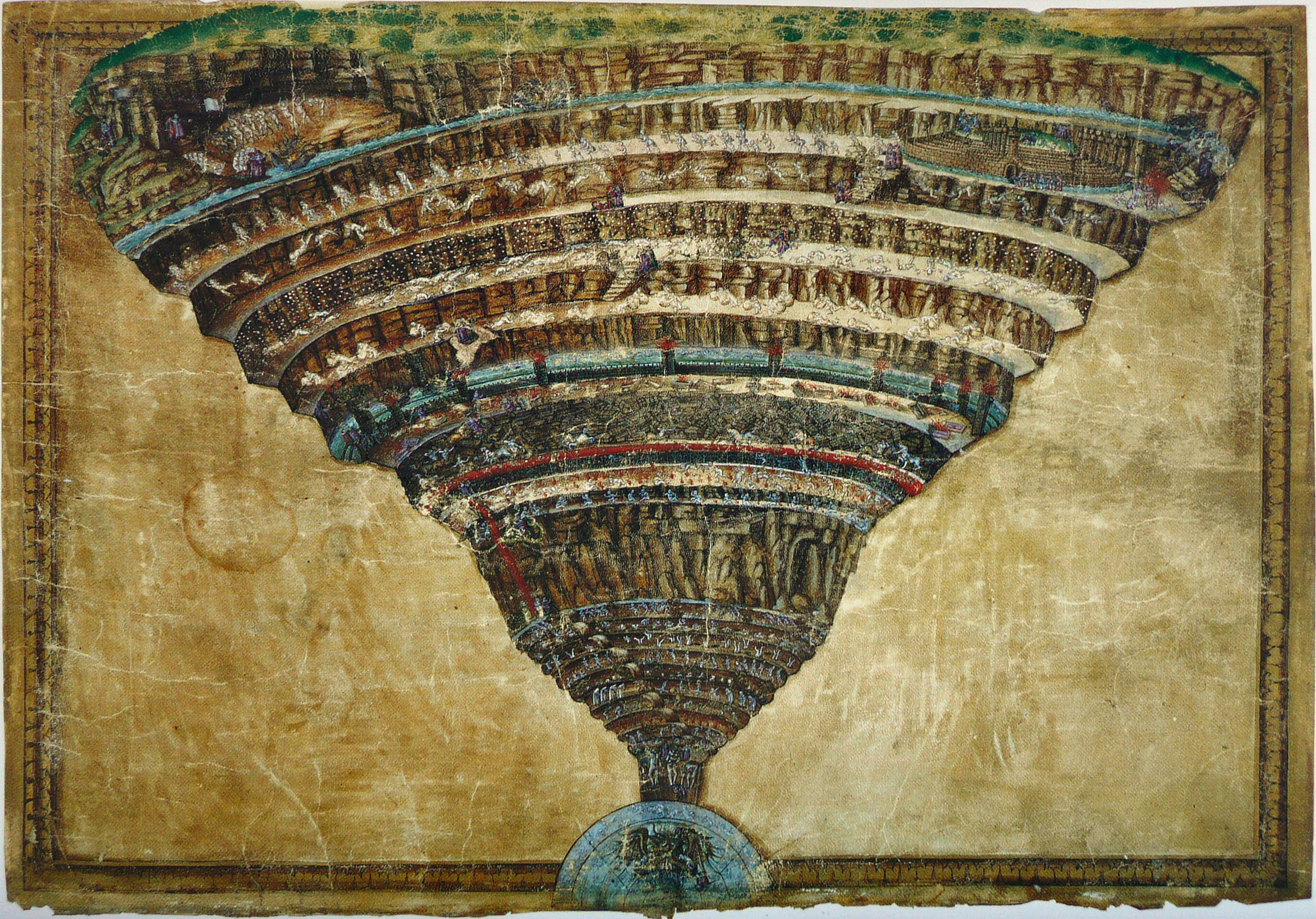
The Map of Hell painting by Botticelli is the subject of the film.

Die Zeit comments that the film is worth seeing "as a background for the blockbuster [Ron Howard's film] – or instead." and further comments that Ron Howard's film only briefly shows a projection of the map, while in Ralph Loop's film the viewer can "marvel at the miracle in detail". The reviewer further asks "A whole film about a darkly colored drawing of just 30 by 40 centimeters, centuries old – is not that terribly dry?" concluding that "In fact, the small film is not meant to provide new insights to art scientists. But it entertains us non-experts in the best possible [way] with the little material that can be filmed in this subject so we see shots of Florence and Rome...". Die Zeit finally concludes, "Anyone who can free himself from such perfectly overworked vision of hell, recognizes Botticelli's painting [for] what it still is: infernal[ly] good."

Spielfilm.de comments that the film will be interesting to "[a]lmost anyone who has a passion for exciting thriller costumes or unsolved secrets (the history of art and culture)". The critic further comments "[o]n the one hand, [Loop] provides a comprehensive insight into the time of Botticelli – at all times, friendly, and comprehensible. And also for cinema-goers, to whom Botticelli and his art so far were largely foreign." Concerning the technology employed to scan the map details, the reviewer remarks that "[f]or the documentary "Botticelli Inferno", the [map] was illuminated with a high-performance scanner. This makes shading, coloring, details and hidden messages visible in an unprecedented way. Things that hitherto remained hidden from the eye." The review also mentions that the film employs a first-person narration technique, when referring to Botticelli, that makes the viewer feel close to the artist. The critic goes on to conclude that the film is: "a masterly, artfully documented work of art, [about] one of the most mysterious works of art in history."

AlloCiné comments that "Botticelli – Inferno transports viewers into another world: a journey to the underworld through the nine levels of hell, as described by Dante. "Only by traveling through hell and purgatory we can reach paradise and emerge to see the stars again" Do not miss this unique event, specially created for cinema."

== Release ==
The film was released in Italy in November 2016.
