= Help! My In-Laws Are Vampires! =

2021 fantasy comedy horror film directed by Volfango De Biasi

- Italian: Una famiglia mostruosa
- Directed by: Volfango De Biasi
- Written by: Volfango De Biasi; Tiziana Martini; Filippo Bologna; Alessandro Bencivenni
- Produced by: Fulvio Lucisano; Federica Lucisano
- Starring: Massimo Ghini; Lucia Ocone; Lillo Petrolo; Ilaria Spada; Cristiano Caccamo; Emanuela Rei; Paolo Calabresi
- Cinematography: Roberto Forza
- Edited by: Stefano Chierchiè
- Music by: Michele Braga
- Production companies: Italian International Film; Rai Cinema
- Distributed by: 01 Distribution
- Release date: 25 November 2021 (Italy)
- Country: Italy
- Language: Italian

Help! My In-Laws Are Vampires! (Italian: Una famiglia mostruosa) is a 2021 Italian fantasy comedy horror film directed by Volfango De Biasi.

== Cast ==
- Massimo Ghini as Vladimiro
- Lucia Ocone as Brunilde
- Lillo Petrolo as Nando
- Ilaria Spada as Stella
- Cristiano Caccamo as Adalberto
- Emanuela Rei as Luna
- Paolo Calabresi as Nanni
- Barbara Bouchet as Crisilde
- Pippo Franco as Paride
- Sara Ciocca as Salmetta
- Vincenzo Sebastiani as Ivano
- Alessandra Scarci as Daphne
- Gabriele Cristini as Orfeo
- Alba De Biasi as Gattina
- Aria De Biasi as Streghetta
- Tancredi Testa as Nicholas
- Massimo Lopez as Sirio (voice)
- Paolo Ruffini as Cagliostro (voice)

== Release ==
The film was released theatrically in Italy on 25 November 2021, distributed by 01 Distribution.

== Sequel ==
A sequel, A Freaking Wedding!, directed by De Biasi and featuring returning cast members, was released in 2023.
