= Paola Minaccioni =

Italian actress

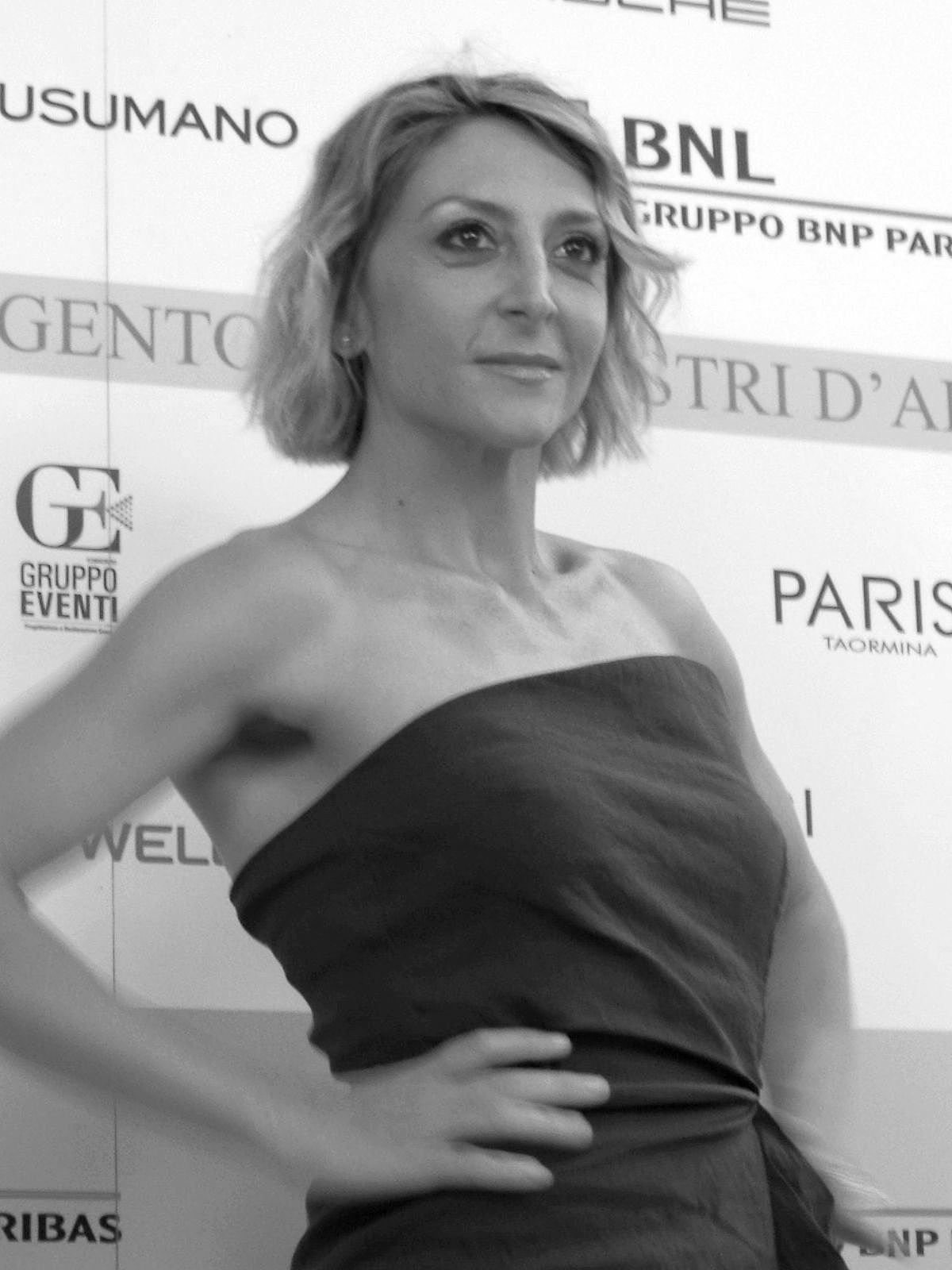
- Minaccioni at the 2014 Silver Ribbon
- Born: 25 September 1971 (age 55); Rome, Italy
- Occupations: Actress; comedian
- Years active: 1993-present

Paola Minaccioni (born 25 September 1971) is an Italian actress.

Her credits include Fasten Your Seatbelts, Many Kisses Later, Magnificent Presence and the television series Una pallottola nel cuore. She won the 2012 Globo d'Oro for her supporting role in Magnificent Presence and the Nastro d'Argento for Best Supporting Actress for Fasten Your Seatbelts in 2014.

== Filmography ==
=== Film ===
Year	Title	Role(s)	Notes
1993	Women Don't Want To	Blonde girl	Uncredited
2003	Instructing the Heart	Veronica	
2005	Sacred Heart	Paola	
2006	Fascisti su Marte	Fascist Epiphany	Cameo appearance
2007	Notte prima degli esami – Oggi	Fan Woman #1	Cameo appearance
2007	Concrete Romance	Agent Mancini	
2008	Un'estate al mare	Patrizia	
2008	No problem	Make-up artist	Cameo appearance
2009	Many Kisses Later	Giorgia	
2010	Loose Cannons	Teresa	
2011	Faccio un salto all'Avana	Laura	
2011	Baciato dalla fortuna	Marisa	
2011	Wedding in Paris	Elvira	
2012	Viva l'Italia	Therapist	Cameo appearance
2012	Magnificent Presence	Maria	
2012	All'ultima spiaggia	Ramona Vallone	
2012	Reality	Client from Rome	Cameo appearance
2013	Pazze di me	Niculina "Bogdana"	
2013	Universitari: Molto più che amici	Amata Cortellacci	
2014	Fasten Your Seatbelts	Egle Santini	
2014	A Fairy-Tale Wedding	Paola DeDonno	
2014	Happily Mixed Up	Vitaliana	
2014	Un Natale stupefacente	Marisa	
2015	Burning Love	AILA President	
2015	Torno indietro e cambio vita	Giuditta Palmierini	
2016	Miami Beach	Paola	
2018	Blessed Madness	Raffaella	
2018	Tutta un'altra vita	Lorella	
2018	A 5-Stars Christmas	Marisa Rispoli	
2019	Don't Stop Me Now	Anita Ruggiero	
2020	Burraco fatale	Rina	
2020	Lockdown all'italiana	Mariella	Also writer
2020	In vacanza su Marte	Elena	
2021	School of Mafia	Carmela	
2021	Genitori vs. Influencer	Aunt Malena	
2022	Io e Spotty	Daniela	
2023	A Freaking Wedding!	Brunilde	
2023	Una commedia pericolosa	Francesca	
2024	Diamonds	Nina	

=== Television ===
Year	Title	Role(s)	Notes
2002	Le ragioni del cuore	Malva	Main role
2005	Distretto di Polizia	Morelli's wife	Episode: "Doppia verità"
2007–2011	Un medico in famiglia	Maura Bettati	Main role (season 5-7)
2009	Un amore di strega	Lucilla	Television film
2011	Notte prima degli esami '82	Antonella	Miniseries
2012	Camera Café	Toilet woman	Episode: "La signora del bagno"
2014–2018	Una pallottola nel cuore	Luisa Renzoni	Main role
2017	In arte Nino	Arsenia Bianconi	Television film
2021	La bambina che non voleva cantare	Sister Margherita	Television film
2022	The Ignorant Angels	Luisella	Main role
2024	Vincenzo Malinconico, Unsuccessful Lawyer	Addolorata	Recurring role (season 2)
