= Forever Young (2016 film) =

- Theatrical release poster
- Directed by: Fausto Brizzi
- Written by: Fausto Brizzi; Marco Martani; Edoardo Falcone
- Produced by: Mario Gianani; Fausto Brizzi
- Starring: Fabrizio Bentivoglio; Sabrina Ferilli; Stefano Fresi; Lorenza Indovina; Lillo; Luisa Ranieri; Teo Teocoli; Claudia Zanella
- Cinematography: Marcello Montarsi
- Music by: Bruno Zambrini
- Distributed by: Medusa Film
- Release date: March 10, 2016
- Running time: 95 min
- Language: Italian

Forever Young is a 2016 Italian comedy film written and directed by Fausto Brizzi.

== Plot ==
Nowadays nobody has a dream anymore; rather, everybody seeks one's lost youth. If you are young you are ‘in’, if you are old you are ‘out’. The film tells the stories of a group of friends, all them ‘Forever Young’. Franco is a pumped-up 70-year-old lawyer, with a passion for Marathon running. His life will change when he becomes a grandfather and discovers that his body is not as indestructible as he thought. Angela, a beautician, has an affair with 20-year-old Luca. Diego, a radio dj, has to face the competition of a younger rival. Giorgio, who is 50 and in a relationship with a very young girl, cheats on her with a woman of his age.

== Cast ==
- Fabrizio Bentivoglio as Giorgio
- Sabrina Ferilli as Angela
- Stefano Fresi as Lorenzo
- Lorenza Indovina as Stefania
- Lillo as Diego DJ
- Teo Teocoli as Franco
- Luisa Ranieri as Sonia
- Claudia Zanella as Marta
- Nino Frassica as the priest
- Emanuel Caserio as Luca
- Pilar Fogliati as Marika
- Francesco Sole as Nick
- Massimo Morini as DJ Fuck Radio

== See also ==
- List of Italian films of 2016
