= Maggie & Bianca: Fashion Friends =

Television series

- Genre: Sitcom
- Created by: Iginio Straffi
- Written by: Marco Rossi
- Starring: Emanuela Rei; Giorgia Boni
- Theme music composer: Maurizio D'Aniello
- Country of origin: Italy
- Original language: Italian
- No. of seasons: 3
- No. of episodes: 78

Production
- Executive producers: Joanne Lee; Denise Bracci; Mario Anniballi; Annita Romanelli
- Camera setup: Single-camera
- Running time: 24 mins
- Production companies: Rainbow S.p.A. Nickelodeon (pilot)

Original release
- Network: Rai Gulp; Netflix (worldwide)
- Release: August 29, 2016 – December 2, 2017

Maggie & Bianca: Fashion Friends is an Italian live-action sitcom which premiered on Rai Gulp on August 29, 2016. The series was created by Iginio Straffi. It focuses on two roommates at the Fashion Academy of Milan: Maggie (Emanuela Rei), an American girl on a scholarship in Italy, and Bianca (Giorgia Boni), the daughter of an Italian fashion entrepreneur.

The series was originally developed as a 2011 television pilot starring the Californian musical duo Kalina and Kiana, titled "My American Friend." The pilot was co-produced by Rainbow SpA and Nickelodeon, which are both part of Viacom. Two Italian actresses, Emanuela Rei and Giorgia Boni, were recast as the two leads after the pilot was greenlit for a full series. As requested by RAI, the series was first performed in Italian and later dubbed into other languages. Three seasons of Maggie & Bianca were filmed at Cinecittà Studios in Rome.

== Plot ==
Maggie is an eccentric American girl from Portland who wins a scholarship to the Fashion Academy of Milan, a prestigious fashion school, on her sixteenth birthday. Bianca is the stylish and chic daughter of a powerful Italian fashion mogul. Bianca likes to sing but doesn't seem too motivated to join a band. The two girls meet and are thrown together as roommates at the Fashion Academy, but they get off to a rocky start as they have very different personalities and conflicting points of view. Over time, they come to understand one another. Together with three of their classmates, they form a band called the MoodBoards in order to pursue their musical dreams, while simultaneously continuing their study of fashion at the Academy. At the end of the first season, Maggie and Bianca discover that they are half-sisters, with the same father but different mothers. In the second season, Maggie's mother, who is a songwriter, comes to the Academy to teach, while members of the MoodBoards' rival band, CoolGhost, attend the Academy as new students.

== Cast ==
- Emanuela Rei as Maggie Davis
- Giorgia Boni as Bianca Lussi
- Sergio Ruggeri as Jacques Bertrand
- Luca Murphy as Quinn O'Connor
- Federica Corti as Nausica Bianchetti
- Federico Pedroni as Leonardo García (season 1)
- Tiffany Zhou as Yuki Abe (seasons 1–2)
- Sergio Melone as Eduard Zonte
- Simone Lijoi as Professor Marco Ferrari (season 1)
- Elia Nichols as Professor Alison Tucker
- Alvaro Gradella as Headmaster Riccardo Maffei
- Walter Leonardi as Uncle Max
- Clelia Piscitello as Dolores Cortés (seasons 1–2)
- Jody Cecchetto as Andrew Moore (recurring, season 1; main, season 2)
- Paolo Fantoni as Felipe Ramirez (recurring, season 1; main, seasons 2–3)
- Simona Di Bella as Susan Grave (recurring, season 1; main, season 2)
- Giovanni Bussi as Professor Ruggero Falques (seasons 2–3)
- Paolo Romano as Alberto Lussi (recurring, season 1; main, seasons 2–3)
- Greta Bellusci as Rachel Davis (guest, season 1; main, seasons 2–3)
- Maria Luisa De Crescenzo as Eloise Gale (season 3)

== Episodes ==
=== Season 1 (2016) ===
No. overall	No. in season	Title	Original release date
1	1	"A Dream Come True"	August 29, 2016
2	2	"Places to Call My Own"	August 30, 2016
3	3	"A Start to Classes"	August 31, 2016
4	4	"Fashion Photography"	September 1, 2016
5	5	"The Most Beautiful Day"	September 2, 2016
6	6	"Keep Your Lucky Charm"	September 3, 2016
7	7	"Model for a Day"	September 4, 2016
8	8	"No Escape from Love"	September 5, 2016
9	9	"A Mile in Her Shoes"	September 6, 2016
10	10	"Shock! Extortion!"	September 7, 2016
11	11	"Raiders of the Lost Exam"	September 8, 2016
12	12	"The Phantom of the Academy"	September 9, 2016
13	13	"A Perfect Concert"	September 10, 2016
14	14	"History Repeats Itself"	September 22, 2016
15	15	"Miss Venice"	September 23, 2016
16	16	"Our School Anniversary"	September 23, 2016
17	17	"A Matter of Style"	September 24, 2016
18	18	"Election Trouble"	September 24, 2016
19	19	"The One I Trust"	September 25, 2016
20	20	"No Mask, No Party"	September 25, 2016
21	21	"Never Mention "CoolGhost""	September 26, 2016
22	22	"Our First Challenge"	September 26, 2016
23	23	"Facing Semifinals"	September 27, 2016
24	24	"Do the Right Thing"	September 27, 2016
25	25	"The Great Lockart"	September 28, 2016
26	26	"Year-end Fashion Show"	September 28, 2016

=== Season 2 (2017) ===
No. overall	No. in season	Title	Original release date
27	1	"A Nightmarish Start"	January 11, 2017
28	2	"Fashion Bloggers Community"	January 11, 2017
29	3	"Polar Opposites"	January 12, 2017
30	4	"Something Go.Zy."	January 12, 2017
31	5	"Hidden Talent"	January 13, 2017
32	6	"At Loggerheads!"	January 13, 2017
33	7	"Each One Has His Story"	January 14, 2017
34	8	"Knights and Princesses"	January 14, 2017
35	9	"The Back of the Book"	January 15, 2017
36	10	"Superpowers"	January 15, 2017
37	11	"Friendship Mission"	January 16, 2017
38	12	"A Matter of Details"	January 16, 2017
39	13	"Grand Gala"	January 17, 2017
40	14	"Leave Your Troubles"	February 12, 2017
41	15	"Where Is Bianca?"	February 13, 2017
42	16	"Reality"	February 13, 2017
43	17	"Strangers at School"	February 14, 2017
44	18	"About the Future"	February 14, 2017
45	19	"#staypositive"	February 15, 2017
46	20	"Mom's Coming!"	February 15, 2017
47	21	"Creative Chaos"	February 16, 2017
48	22	"No Trick, No Illusion"	February 16, 2017
49	23	"The Worst Is the New Best"	February 17, 2017
50	24	"Try Again, Maggie!"	February 17, 2017
51	25	"A Weird Family"	February 18, 2017
52	26	"The Musical"	February 18, 2017

=== Season 3 (2017) ===
A third season aired in Italy between September 18 and December 2, 2017, and consisted of 26 episodes. The third season has not yet been released internationally on Netflix.

== Production ==
In September 2011, Rainbow and Nickelodeon (both part of Viacom) began filming a pilot episode for a new project in Tolentino, Marche. The pilot's working title was My American Friend and it starred Kiana and Kalina Campion, two singers from Los Angeles. According to a press tagline, it was meant to show "Italy seen through the eyes of two American teenagers". Filming continued in Milan and Rome, and in 2012, a 26-episode season of My American Friend was listed on Rainbow's content slate. Three years passed before production on a first season started. According to creator Iginio Straffi, his collaborators "had to throw away many scripts until they finally found the right key with a new formula." Kalina and Kiana Campion called the development process "extremely slow."

In July 2015, a full series was announced, with the Campions and Nickelodeon's American studio still attached to the project. Kalina and Kiana Campion decided to pass on the lead roles shortly before production started, and the American studio was no longer needed. The Campions would later return to write songs and make guest appearances for the completed series, but Italian actresses Emanuela Rei and Giorgia Boni were recast as the two lead characters. Rei and Boni were chosen out of around 400 auditions. At the request of RAI, which broadcast the show in Italy, the show was originally performed in Italian. Filming for the first season began in September 2015 at Cinecittà Studios in Rome, still under the working title My American Friend.

In April 2016, the show's new title, Maggie & Bianca: Fashion Friends, was revealed. The first season was screened at the Giffoni Film Festival in July 2016 and premiered on Rai Gulp on August 29, 2016. Filming on a third season of the series took place during summer 2017, and premiered in mid-September on Rai Gulp in Italy.

== Broadcast ==
Maggie & Bianca Fashion Friends was originally televised on Rai Gulp in Italy, where the first season aired from August 29 to September 28, 2016. The second season aired in Italy between January 11 and February 18, 2017, with the third season following between September 18 and December 2, 2017.

The series was broadcast throughout Europe, including in Greece and Portugal. Worldwide, the series' first two seasons were made available on Netflix, including in the United States, Canada, the United Kingdom, Ireland, Australia and New Zealand. The first season was released on Netflix on March 31, 2017, with the second season released on April 30, 2018.
