= Natale a Londra – Dio salvi la regina =

2016 Italian comedy film

- Film poster
- Directed by: Volfango De Biasi
- Written by: Volfango de Biasi
- Produced by: Aurelio De Laurentiis; Luigi De Laurentiis
- Starring: Lillo Petrolo; Claudio Gregori; Paolo Ruffini; Eleonora Giovanardi; Nino Frassica
- Cinematography: Tani Canevari
- Edited by: Stefano Chierchiè
- Music by: Carlo Gregori; Attilio Di Giovanni
- Distributed by: Filmauro
- Release date: December 15, 2016 (Italy)
- Running time: 101 minutes
- Country: Italy
- Language: Italian

Natale a Londra – Dio salvi la regina (lit. 'Christmas in London: God save the queen') is a 2016 Italian comedy film directed by Volfango De Biasi.

== Cast ==
- Lillo Petrolo as Erminio
- Claudio Gregori as Prisco
- Paolo Ruffini as Vanni
- Eleonora Giovanardi as Anita
- Nino Frassica as 'U Barone
- Uccio De Santis as Il Barese
- Enzo Iuppariello as Enzo
- Monica Lima as Monica
- Enrico Guarneri as 'U Mago
- Ninetto Davoli as Er Duca
- Vincent Riotta as Robocop
- Sergio Di Pinto as Duca's henchman
- Patricia Ford as Queen Elizabeth

== See also ==
- List of Christmas films
