= Codice rosso =

2006 Italian television series

- Genre: Action drama
- Created by: Alesseandro Sermoneta; Alberto Taraglio; Elena Bucaccio
- Starring: Alessandro Gassmann; Pietro Taricone; Claudio Gioè; Ilaria Spada; Silvio Laviano; Paolo Sassanelli; Paolo Serra; Maud Buquet; Luca Cianchetti; Anna Melato; Antonello Fassari; Michele Venitucci; Federico Vanni
- Country of origin: Italy
- No. of seasons: 1
- No. of episodes: 12

Production
- Running time: 60 mins (episode)

Original release
- Network: Canale 5
- Release: 16 November – 15 December 2006

Codice rosso (Code Red) is an Italian action drama television series produced in 2006 and broadcast on Canale 5 between 16 November and 15 December 2006.

The series deals with the adventures of team 15A of the Vigili del Fuoco.

== Cast ==
- Alessandro Gassman: Pietro Vega
- Pietro Taricone: Fausto Rossi
- Claudio Gioè: Ivan Amidei
- Ilaria Spada: Stella Sandri
- Silvio Laviano: Rocco Parrino
- Antonello Fassari: Fulvio Torri
- Paolo Sassanelli: Siddharta
- Paolo Serra: Magrelli
- Lino Damiani:
- Maud Buquet: Aisha
- Anna Melato: Adele Nistri
- Michele Venitucci: Bruno Nistri

== See also ==
- List of Italian television series
