= In fuga con Babbo Natale =

2023 Christmas comedy film directed by Volfango De Biasi

- Directed by: Volfango De Biasi
- Screenplay by: Volfango De Biasi; Tiziana Martini; Fabio Bonifacci
- Produced by: Iginio Straffi; Alessandro Usai
- Starring: Giampaolo Morelli; Enea Indraccolo; Ilaria Spada
- Cinematography: Marcello Montarsi
- Edited by: Stefano Chierchiè
- Production company: Colorado Film
- Distributed by: Netflix
- Release date: 15 December 2023 (Italy)
- Running time: 100 minutes
- Country: Italy
- Language: Italian

In fuga con Babbo Natale (Italian for "On the Run with Santa Claus") is a 2023 Italian Christmas comedy film directed by Volfango De Biasi and starring Giampaolo Morelli, Enea Indraccolo and Ilaria Spada. Produced by Colorado Film, it is a remake of the 2014 French film Le Père Noël, directed by Alexandre Coffre. It was released on Netflix on 15 December 2023.

== Cast ==
- Giampaolo Morelli as Pasquale / Santa Claus
- Enea Indraccolo as Antonio
- Ilaria Spada as Chicca, Antonio's mother
- Mario de la Rosa as Xavier
- Elisa Di Eusanio
- Michela Andreozzi
- Renato Marchetti
- Marco Conidi
- Romano Talevi
- Federico Tocci
- Ninni Bruschetta
