= Irene Ferri =

Italian actress and television presenter

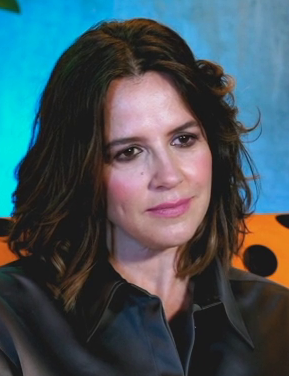
- Ferri in 2023
- Born: 29 March 1972 (age 53); Rome, Italy
- Occupations: Actress; television presenter

Irene Ferri (born 29 March 1972) is an Italian actress and television presenter.

Born in Rome, Italy, Ferri studied acting at Actors Studio in New York, with Susan Strasberg as tutor, and later at Centro Sperimentale di Cinematografia. She debuted as a film actress in 1995 in Giacomo Battiato's Cronaca di un amore violato; in the same period she starred in several commercials and was the television hostess of the RAI children's television programs A Tutto Disney and Solletico. She played main roles in several TV-series such as Questa casa non è un albergo, Sospetti, Le ragioni del cuore, and supporting roles in TV-series such as Tutti pazzi per amore and in films including Fascisti su Marte and Il giorno in più.
