= A Fairy-Tale Wedding =

- Film poster
- Italian: Un matrimonio da favola
- Directed by: Carlo Vanzina
- Written by: Carlo Vanzina; Enrico Vanzina; Edoardo Falcone
- Starring: Adriano Giannini; Ricky Memphis; Paola Minaccioni; Andrea Osvárt; Giorgio Pasotti; Stefania Rocca; Riccardo Rossi; Emilio Solfrizzi; Ilaria Spada; Max Tortora
- Cinematography: Enrico Lucidi
- Edited by: Luca Montanari
- Music by: Franco Godi
- Release date: 10 April 2014
- Running time: 91 minutes
- Country: Italy
- Language: Italian

A Fairy-Tale Wedding (Italian: Un matrimonio da favola) is a 2014 Italian romantic comedy film directed by Carlo Vanzina.

== Plot ==
Daniele is a humble and shy bank employee who is about to marry the love of his life, Barbara, a wealthy Swiss girl from an upper-class family. To celebrate the event, Daniele invites his childhood friends, whom he hasn't seen in years, to his lavish wedding in Switzerland.

The group of friends — Luca, a womanizing tour guide; Luciana, a former female football player married to a naggy man named Fabio; Giovanni, a shop assistant with a stale marriage with a divorce lawyer who dates the young and attractive Sara; and Alessandro, a gay man hiding his true identity from his father who forced him to join the army — reunites for the first time in years. Each of them is grappling with personal issues, secrets, and ambitions that surface during the wedding celebrations.

As the weekend unfolds, a series of comedic misadventures, misunderstandings, and unexpected twists occur. These include secret love affairs, hidden agendas, and the unveiling of long-buried truths. The wedding becomes a catalyst for the group to reflect on their lives, friendships, and the choices they've made.

In the end, through laughter, tears, and chaos, the characters learn to face their realities and rediscover the importance of friendship and authenticity. Despite the challenges, and Barbara's betrayal of him, Daniele's wedding ultimately becomes a memorable event for everyone involved.

== Cast ==
- Adriano Giannini as Luca Maggi
- Ricky Memphis as Daniele Baldini
- Paola Minaccioni as Paola De Donno
- Andrea Osvárt as Barbara Meyer
- Giorgio Pasotti as Alessandro Germani
- Stefania Rocca as Luciana Rivetti
- Riccardo Rossi as Fabio Rocchetti
- Emilio Solfrizzi as Giovanni Guastamaglia
- Ilaria Spada as Sara Farinacci
- Max Tortora as Nando Croce
- Luca Angeletti as Roberto Astolfi
- Pia Engleberth as Brunella Mittelmach
- Teco Celio as Casimiro Guallinetti
- Stephan Käfer as Michael Timonov
- Gabrielle Scharnitzky as Ludmilla Pitermev
- Francesco Cataldo as Angelo Guerrini
- Roberta Fiorentini as Iole Capozzi
