= Lightning Strike =

2012 film

- Italian: Colpi di fulmine
- Directed by: Neri Parenti
- Written by: Alessandro Bencivenni; Domenico Saverni; Volfango De Biasi; Neri Parenti
- Produced by: Aurelio De Laurentiss
- Starring: Christian De Sica; Luisa Ranieri; Arisa; Simone Barbato; Lillo; Greg; Anna Foglietta
- Cinematography: Tani Canevari
- Music by: Claudio Gregori; Attilio Di Giovanni
- Release date: 13 December 2012
- Running time: 104 minutes
- Country: Italy
- Language: Italian

Lightning Strike (Italian: Colpi di fulmine) is a 2012 Italian romantic comedy film directed by Neri Parenti and starring Christian De Sica and Lillo & Greg. It was a commercial success, grossing $13,378,892 at the Italian box office.

For her performance in this film Anna Foglietta was nominated for Silver Ribbon for Best Supporting Actress.

== Plot ==
The film is divided into two episodes. In the first episode the primary Alberto Benni risks arrest because he has evaded taxes. So run away in a small village in Trentino Alto Adige, posing as a priest. He also falls in love with a beautiful policewoman...

In the second story, Ermete Maria Grilli is the Ambassador of Italy in Vatican, and has as chauffeur his friend Lillo. One day Ermeyte, beautiful, elegant and fine character, falls in love with a vulgar fishwife girl, but funny and beautiful. Ermete then asks his friend Lillo one thing: to be turned into a perfect Roman vulgar peasant in order to please Angela.

== Cast ==
- Christian De Sica as Alberto Benni
- Greg as Ermete Maria Grilli
- Lillo as Ferdinando
- Luisa Ranieri as Angela
- Arisa as Tina
- Anna Foglietta as Adele Ventresca
- Simone Barbato as Oscar
- Debora Caprioglio as Francesca
- Luis Molteni as Don Dino
- Chiara Sani as Marcella Bolin
- Vauro as Don Brunoro
- Gabriele Pignotta as Sergio
- Fabio Avaro as Lallo
- Lallo Circosta as Facinoroso
- Armando De Razza as Cardinal Pini Sburga
- Martine Brochard as Ermete's mother
- Gina Rovere as Capatrice
