= Le ragioni del cuore =

- Genre: Romantic comedy
- Created by: Luca Manfredi
- Starring: Irene Ferri; Sabrina Impacciatore; Luigi Diberti; Massimo Reale; Thomas Trabacchi; Tiziana Lodato
- Country of origin: Italy
- No. of seasons: 1
- No. of episodes: 6

Production
- Producer: Edwige Fenech

Original release
- Network: Rai 1
- Release: January 13 – February 17, 2002

Le ragioni del cuore ("The reasons of the heart") is a 2002 Italian romantic comedy mini series directed by Luca Manfredi, Anna Di Francisca and Alberto Simone. It was broadcast on Rai Uno. It consists of six episodes, each having a budget of about 1 billion and 800 million lire. Every episode has a special guest-star (Nino Manfredi, Alessandro Benvenuti, Nando Gazzolo, Gioele Dix, Francesco Paolantoni, Rodolfo Laganà).

== Main cast ==
- Irene Ferri as Andreina Ciccone
- Sabrina Impacciatore as Rosamaria Ciccone
- Luigi Diberti as Oreste Ciccone
- Fioretta Mari as Giovanna
- Pietro De Silva as Salvatore
- Paola Minaccioni as Malva
- Fabio Traversa as Manlio
- Massimo Reale as Pietro
- Sonia Gessner as Eleonora
- Thomas Trabacchi as Morandi
- David Sebasti as Antonio Marullo
- Cinzia Mascoli
- Tiziana Lodato
