= Lockdown all'italiana =

2020 film directed by Enrico Vanzina

- Film poster
- Directed by: Enrico Vanzina
- Written by: Enrico Vanzina
- Produced by: Adriano De Micheli; Enrico Vanzina
- Starring: Ezio Greggio; Ricky Memphis; Paola Minaccioni; Martina Stella
- Cinematography: Claudio Zamarion
- Music by: Silvio Amato; Umberto Smaila
- Release date: 15 October 2020
- Country: Italy
- Language: Italian

Lockdown all'italiana (lit. 'Italian-style lockdown') is a 2020 Italian comedy film directed by Enrico Vanzina.

== Cast ==
- Ezio Greggio as Giovanni
- Ricky Memphis as Walter
- Paola Minaccioni as Mariella
- Martina Stella as Tamara
- Marialuisa Jacobelli as Monica
- Romina Pierdomenico as Bianca
- Riccardo Rossi as Alberto Persichetti
- Biagio Izzo as Lepore
- Maurizio Mattioli as Marione
- Fabrizio Bracconeri
- Gaia Insenga as Veronica
- Enzo Salvi as Paolo (voice)
- Giuseppe Casteltrione as Gaetano
