= Lillo Petrolo =

Italian actor and comedian (born 1962)

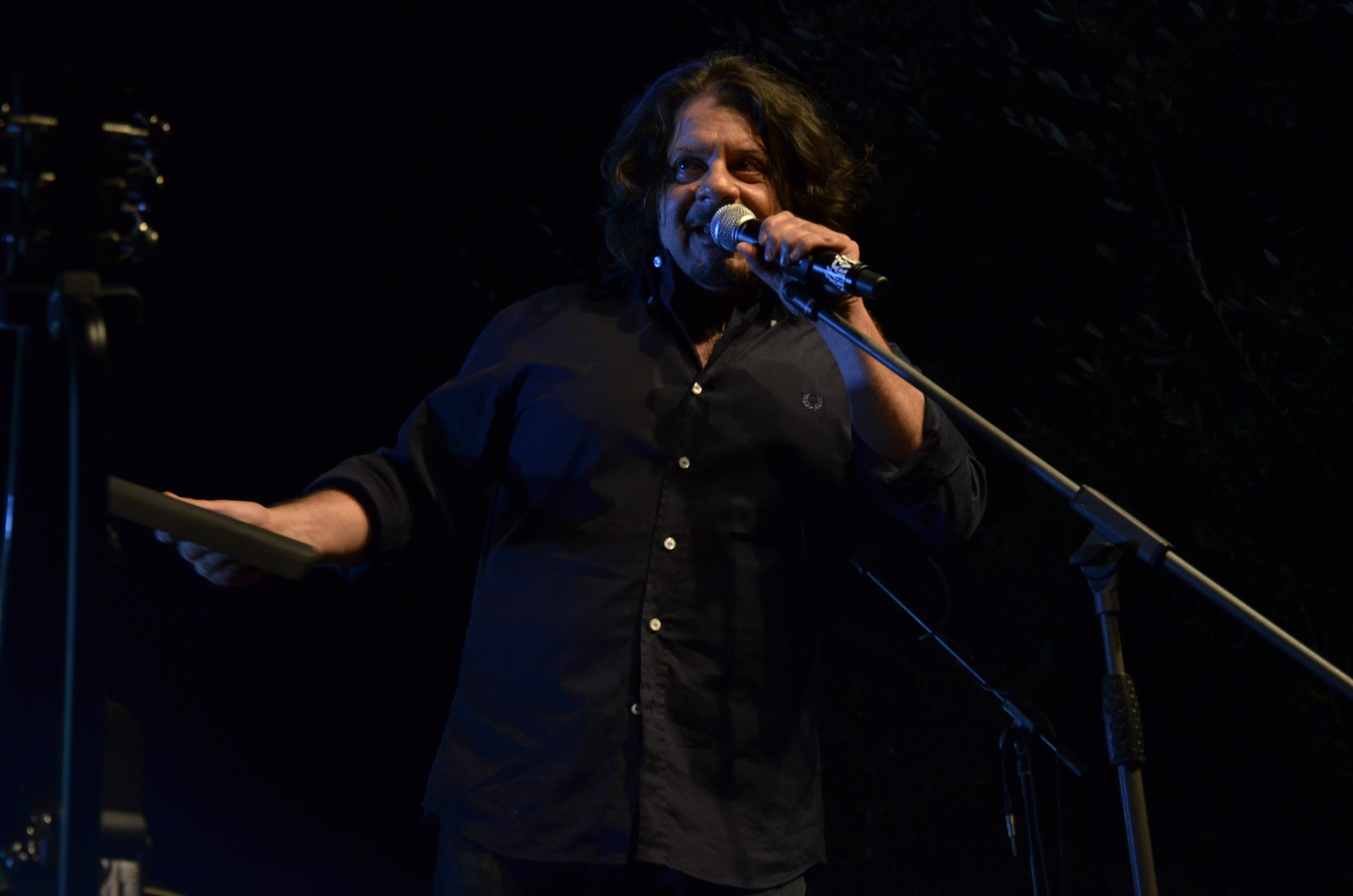
- Petrolo in 2011
- Born: Pasquale Petrolo; 27 August 1962 (age 64); Rome, Italy
- Occupations: Actor, comedian, screenwriter, director, singer, cartoonist
- Years active: 1991–present

Pasquale Petrolo (born 27 August 1962), known professionally as Lillo Petrolo or simply Lillo, is an Italian actor, comedian, screenwriter, director and singer. He is best known as part of the comedy duo Lillo & Greg, alongside Claudio Gregori, with whom he has worked in television, radio, theatre, film and music.

Alongside his work with Gregori, Petrolo has pursued an independent career as a film and television actor, appearing in films such as Fascisti su Marte (2006), The Great Beauty (2013), Forever Young (2016) and Elf Me (2023). He gained wider popularity with the character Posaman in the comedy show LOL - Chi ride è fuori (2021), which later inspired the television series Sono Lillo (2023–2024).

== Life and career ==
Petrolo was born in Rome, Italy. He met Claudio Gregori in 1986 while working at a comic book publishing house, and the two subsequently collaborated as comic book writers and illustrators. In 1991, they began their musical project, Latte & i Suoi Derivati, combining comedy with rock music. The duo became known on Italian television through Le Iene in the late 1990s. They appeared in numerous television programmes and developed a successful career in radio and theatre.

As a film actor, Petrolo has appeared in films including Fascisti su Marte (2006), Escort in Love (2011), Partly Cloudy with Sunny Spells (2015), Forever Young (2016) and Modalità aereo (2019). In 2013, he appeared in Paolo Sorrentino's film The Great Beauty, playing the role of Lillo De Gregorio, a wealthy villa owner and agent, whose name is a tribute to himself and Gregori. In 2019, he starred in the Italian stage production of the musical School of Rock and received the Flaiano Award for Best Musical Act. In 2020, he made his feature film directorial debut with the comedy film D.N.A.: Decisamente non adatti, co-directed with Gregori, followed by Gli idoli delle donne in 2022, co-directed with Gregori and Eros Puglielli.

In 2021, Petrolo participated in the first season of the comedy show LOL - Chi ride è fuori. He later starred in the comedy television series Sono Lillo (2023), released on Amazon Prime Video. In 2023, he starred in the Prime Video comedy film Elf Me.

== Filmography ==
Film
Year	Title	Role
1999	Bagnomaria	Man in Black
2001	Blek Giek	Gigino
2006	Per non dimenticarti	Eugenio
2006	Fascisti su Marte	Pini
2007	Lillo e Greg: The Movie!	Lillo
2010	Cacao	Gaudenzi
2011	Escort in Love	Enzo
2012	Love Is in the Air	Pharmacist
2012	Lightning Strike	Nando
2013	Colpi di fortuna	Felice Mammola
2013	Mi rifaccio vivo	Biagio Bianchetti
2013	The Great Beauty	Lillo De Gregorio
2014	Un Natale stupefacente	Remo
2015	Natale col boss	Alex
2015	Partly Cloudy with Sunny Spells	Ermanno
2016	Forever Young	Diego
2016	Natale a Londra – Dio salvi la regina	Erminio
2017	Nove lune e mezza	Gianni
2018	Detective per caso	Uncle Giuseppe
2019	Modalità aereo	Ivano
2019	Beware the Gorilla	Jimmy
2019	Il grande salto	Ghigo
2020	Permette? Alberto Sordi	Aldo Fabrizi
2020	D.N.A.: Decisamente non adatti	Nando
2021	Tutti per Uma	Dante
2021	The Crypt Monster	Busirivici
2021	Help! My In-Laws Are Vampires!	Nando
2022	Gli idoli delle donne	Filippo
2022	Drive Me Crazy	Paolo
2023	Grosso guaio all'Esquilino	Martino
2023	Elf Me	Trip
2024	The Trainers	Pasquale Marolla
2024	Cortina Express	Dino Doni
2025	Tutta colpa del rock	Bruno Verdocchi
2026	Agata Christian: Delitto sulle nevi	Vanni Cuozzo

Television
Year	Title	Role	Notes
2001	Via Zanardi, 33	Nicola	Episode "Si fa presto a dire rimani te stesso"
2006–2007	Normalman	Piermaria Carletti / Normalman	Main role
2007	Un medico in famiglia	Zinco	3 episodes
2008	Amiche mie	Filippo	Episode "Il coraggio di cambiare"
2010	Inspector Coliandro	Bertoni	Episode "Anomalia 21"
2011	Lola & Virginia	Johnny Fargo	Episode "Bestseller" (voice role)
2023	Gigolò per caso	Passerby	Episode "Marta"
2023–2024	Sono Lillo	Lillo	Lead role
2025	Il Baracchino	Maurizio	Main role (voice role)
