= Cristiano Caccamo =

Italian actor and author (born 1989)

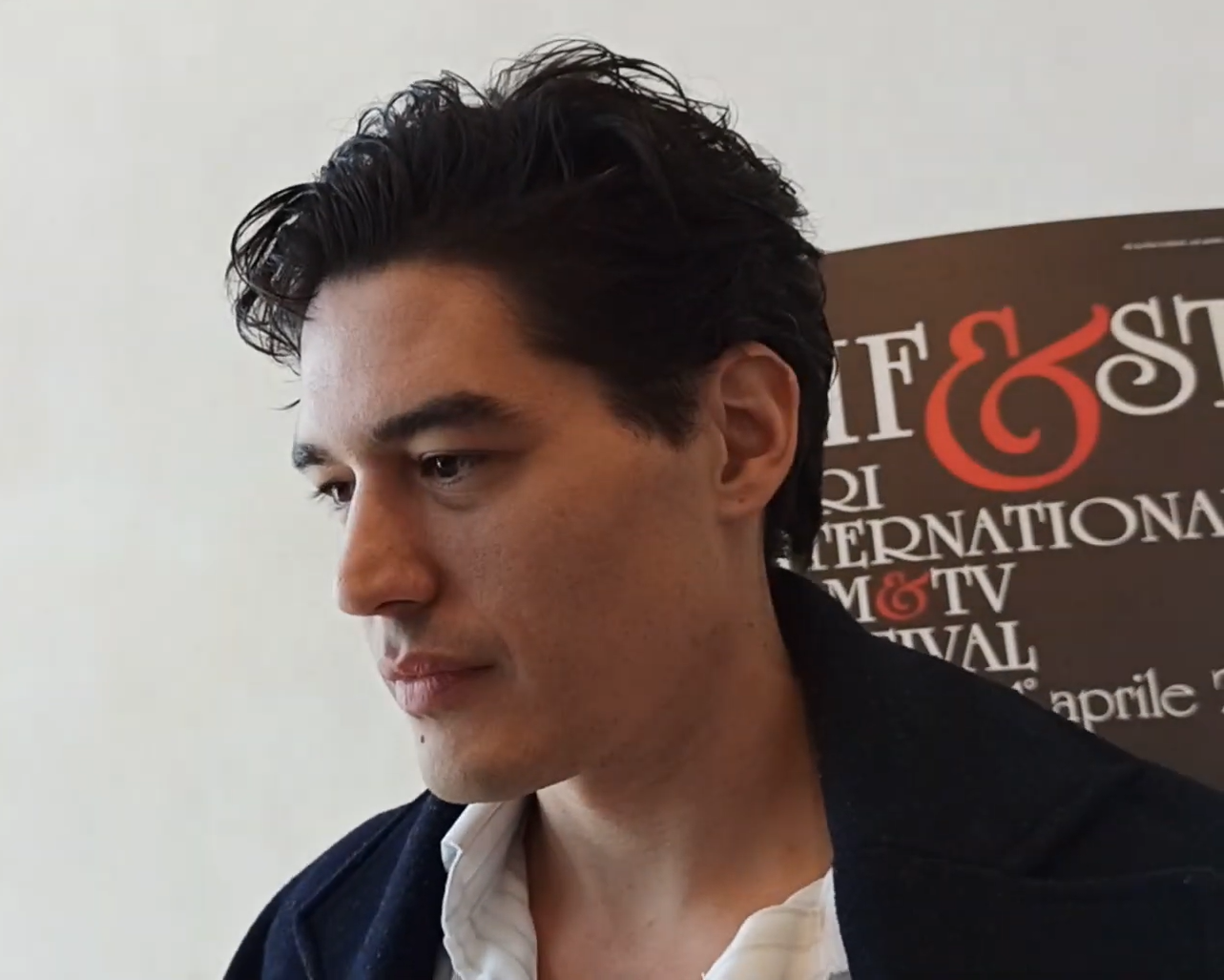
- Caccamo in 2023
- Born: 21 March 1989 (age 37); Taurianova, Reggio Calabria, Italy
- Education: Centro Sperimentale di Cinematografia
- Occupations: Actor; author
- Years active: 2010–present

Cristiano Caccamo (Italian pronunciation: [kriˈstjaːno ˈkakkamo]; born 21 March 1989) is an Italian actor.

== Biography ==
Caccamo was born in Taurianova, the son of poet and writer Michele Caccamo. He has one brother, Gabriele. At the age of 15, he left his hometown to attend a boarding school in Assisi. He originally wanted to be an architect, but later graduated from the Centro Sperimentale di Cinematografia in Rome.

Caccamo was encouraged by his father to work full-time as an actor. In 2010, he made his theater debut as a soldier in the play Ciechi. In 2020, he published his debut novel, Chiedimi la Luna. Aside from acting, he also operates a restaurant in Rome.

== Filmography ==
=== Film ===
Year	Title	Role	Notes	Ref.
2014	La vita oscena			
2015	Cenere	Julien		
2018	My Big Gay Italian Wedding	Antonio		
2020	Under the Riccione Sun	Ciro		
2021	She's the One	Beniamino		
2021	La regina di cuori:	Andrea	Short film	
2021	Help! My In-Laws Are Vampires!	Adalberto		
2022	Bla Bla Baby	Mattia De Bortoli		
2022	Jumping from High Places	Danio		
2023	Io e mio fratello	Mauro		
2023	My Paper Dolls	Claudio		
2023	A Freaking Wedding!	Adalberto		
2026	No Place to Be Single	Michele		
TBA	Eternity	Luca		

=== Television ===
Year	Title	Role	Notes	Ref.
2013–2014	Questo è il mio paese	Cosimo Malorni	12 episodes	
2015	Anastasia Love Dance	Leo	6 episodes	
2015–2017	The Ladies' Paradise	Quinto Reggiani	40 episodes	
2016	Matrimoni e altre follie	Tony		
2018	The Promised Life	Michele Carrizzo	4 episodes	
2018	Don Matteo	Giovanni Santucci	26 episodes	
2017–2019	Che Dio ci aiuti	Gabriele Mattei	40 episodes	
2020	Celebrity Hunted: Caccia all'uomo	Self	6 episodes	
2022	Summertime	Luca	2 episodes	
2022	Una scomoda eredità	Max	Television film	
2023	LOL - Chi ride è fuori	Self	6 episodes	
2023–2024	Sono Lillo	Edoardo	8 episodes	
2025	Leopardi - Il poeta dell'infinito	Ranieri		

=== Music videos ===
Year	Title	Artist	Role	Ref.
2018	"Non è detto"	Laura Pausini	Man	

== Bibliography ==
- Caccamo, Cristiano (2020). Chiedimi la luna (in Italian). HarperCollins Italia. ISBN 978-8869058394.
