= Tommaso (2016 film) =

- Directed by: Kim Rossi Stuart
- Written by: Kim Rossi Stuart; Federico Starnone
- Produced by: Carlo Degli Esposti
- Starring: Cristiana Capotondi; Camilla Diana; Jasmine Trinca; Kim Rossi Stuart; and Dagmar Lassander
- Cinematography: Gian Filippo Corticelli
- Edited by: Marco Spoletini
- Distributed by: 01 Distribution
- Release date: September 6, 2016 (Venice Film Festival)
- Running time: 94 minutes
- Language: Italian
- Box office: $350,367

Tommaso is a 2016 Italian comedy-drama film written by, directed by and starring Kim Rossi Stuart. It was screened out of competition at the 73rd edition of the Venice Film Festival.

== Plot ==
After a lengthy relationship, Tommaso manages to get away from Chiara, his companion. Now waiting for him - he thinks - is endless freedom and countless adventures. He is a young, handsome, kind and romantic actor, but he perpetually swings between elan and resistance and soon realizes he is only free to repeat the same script: in short, he is a "ticking bomb" on the road of the women he meets. His relationships always end in the same painful way, between unspeakable thoughts and paralyzing fears. This repetition compulsion is one day finally interrupted and within him it generates an absolute void. Tommaso is now alone and has no more escape: he has to confront that moment of his past when everything stopped.

== Cast ==
- Kim Rossi Stuart as Tommaso
- Cristiana Capotondi as Federica
- Camilla Diana as Sonia
- Jasmine Trinca as Chiara
- Dagmar Lassander as Stefania
- Serra Yilmaz as Alberta
- Edoardo Pesce as Gianni
- Renato Scarpa as Mario
- Melissa Bartolini as Marcella
- Alessandro Genovesi as Genovesi

== Reception ==
Tommaso grossed $350,367 at the box office.

== See also ==
- List of Italian films of 2016
