= TV Plus =

Television station in North Macedonia

TV Plus ТВ Плус
- Country: North Macedonia
- Broadcast area: Kumanovo
- Headquarters: Kumanovo, North Macedonia

Programming
- Language: Macedonian

Ownership
- Owner: Dragan Ivanovski

History
- Launched: April 1, 2015 (10 years ago)

Links
- Website: tvplus.mk

TV Plus (Macedonian: ТВ Плус) is a local television station in Kumanovo, North Macedonia.

== Line up ==
- News (Macedonian: Вести)
- No ill will (Macedonian: Нема Љутиш)
- Shelter of imagination (Macedonian: Засолниште на имагинацијата)
