= Felicia Kingsley =

Italian novelist and architect

- Born: Serena Artioli; 1987 (age 38–39); Carpi, Emilia-Romagna, Italy
- Occupations: Novelist, architect
- Writing career
- Language: Italian
- Years active: 2014–present
- Genres: Romance, romantic comedy
- Notable awards: TikTok Book Awards – Author of the Year (2024); Premio Hemingway – Lignano per il Futuro (2025)

Serena Artioli, known by her pen name Felicia Kingsley (born 1987) is an Italian novelist and architect known for writing romance novels.

== Early life and education ==
Artioli was born in Carpi, Italy. She attended a scientific high school and graduated with a degree in architecture in 2012.

== Career ==
In 2020, her novels ranked first and third in the Kindle Store's romance e-book chart.

In 2024 she received the Author of the Year award at the TikTok Book Awards held during the Turin International Book Fair.

== Awards and honours ==
Year	Award	Category	Result	Ref.
2024	TikTok Book Awards	Author of the Year	Won	
2025	Premio Hemingway	Lignano per il Futuro	Won	
