= Bagnomaria =

1999 film

- Directed by: Giorgio Panariello
- Written by: Leo Benvenuti; Piero De Bernardi; Giorgio Panariello
- Produced by: Vittorio Cecchi Gori; Rita Rusić
- Starring: Giorgio Panariello
- Cinematography: Danilo Desideri
- Edited by: Antonio Siciliano
- Music by: Gianluca Sibaldi
- Production company: Cecchi Gori
- Release date: 12 February 1999
- Running time: 90 minutes
- Country: Italy
- Language: Italian
- Box office: $4.2 million (Italy)

Bagnomaria is a 1999 Italian comedy film directed by Giorgio Panariello.

== Cast ==
- Giorgio Panariello as Mario, PR, Merigo and Simone
- Gianna Giachetti as Bice
- Manuela Arcuri as Mara
- Andrea Cambi as Rodolfo
- Ugo Pagliai as mayor Valdemaro
- Katia Beni as Ines, the mayor's wife
- Pietro Fornaciari as Livorno
- Lillo Petrolo as Man in black
- Claudio Gregori as Man in black
- Dario Cassini as Alex
- Isabella Orsini as Cristina
- Alberto Caiazza as Space
- Gina Rovere as the nun
- Renzo Rinaldi as Don Paolo
- Mario Cipollini as himself
- Tony Corallo as himself
