= Three Wives (film) =

- Tre Mogli
- Directed by: Marco Risi
- Written by: Marco Risi; Silvia Napolitano
- Produced by: Marco Risi; Maurizio Tedesco; Pietro Innocenti; Marco Guidone
- Starring: Iaia Forte; Silke; Francesca D'Aloja
- Release date: 26 September 2001
- Running time: 107 minutes
- Country: Italy

Three Wives (Italian: Tre mogli) is a 2001 comedy-drama film directed by Marco Risi. It follows a trio of Italian women trying to track down their missing husbands, who have apparently fled to Argentina after robbing a bank. Iaia Forte was nominated for the 2002 Silver Ribbons for the best supporting actress for her role as Bianca in this movie.

== Plot ==
On New Year's Eve, three women - Beatrice, Bianca, and Billie - meet at a police station. The women find out that their husbands have disappeared after stealing 9 billion lire from the bank at which the husbands work. The trio, despite having very different personalities, decide to embark on a trip together in search of their missing husbands, who have apparently fled to Argentina.

On the trip, each woman makes a startling discovery. Beatrice finds out that her husband Saverio had been cheating on her with his ex-girlfriend, who he apparently lived with in Buenos Aires, Argentina. Bianca discovers that her husband Antonio went to prostitutes and had a girlfriend who is an actress in telenovelas. Billie discovers that her husband Gino has always been homosexual.

Amedeo, a clumsy policeman with an overbearing fiancee, befriends the women in the disguise of a nature photographer and joins them on their trip. Amedeo falls in love with Billie and spends one night with her, while Bianca and Beatrice each have a one-night stand with a tango teacher and a French tourist, respectively.

When it seems like the wives are about to find their husbands, they discover that the husbands’ boat hit the Perito Moreno Glacier, killing them. But unbeknownst to the wives, the bankrupt men had actually staged their deaths and assumed false identities. The husbands then reach out to the wives and ask them to meet them in Ushuaia, Argentina.

The three women, however, now aware of how much better their life could be without their husbands, abandon them. Billie marries Amedeo and has a son. Beatrice and Bianca move to Buenos Aires and open a restaurant called "Le Tre Mogli" ("The Three Wives"). But on the next New Year's Eve, in the last minute of the film, their husbands enter the restaurant ...

== Cast ==
- Iaia Forte as Bianca
- Silke as Billie
- Francesca D'Aloja as Beatrice
- Claudio Gregori as Amadeo

== Production ==
The restaurant scene was filmed over two days in San Babila, a classic Italian restaurant in Buenos Aires.
