= Sospetti =

- Genre: Police procedural; Crime drama; Legal drama
- Created by: Luigi Perelli
- Starring: Sebastiano Somma; Isabella Ferrari; Simona Cavallari; Remo Girone; Irene Ferri; Romina Mondello; Vanessa Gravina; Christiane Filangieri
- Country of origin: Italy
- No. of seasons: 3
- No. of episodes: 18

Production
- Running time: 90 min

Original release
- Network: Rai 2 (season 1); Rai 1 (season 2-3)
- Release: September 4, 2000 – March 17, 2005

Sospetti is an Italian police procedural crime drama television series, created by Luigi Perelli, which aired on RAI from 2000 to 2005.

== Cast ==
- Sebastiano Somma: Luca Bartoli
- Isabella Ferrari: Serena Arcalli
- Irene Ferri: Monica Ramondini
- Romina Mondello: Chiara Colizzi
- Vanessa Gravina: Simona Federici
- Simona Cavallari: Manuela Colizzi Cosentino
- Christiane Filangieri: Elena e Mara Volpi
- Remo Girone: Avv. Villani; Mr. X
- Orso Maria Guerrini: Proc. Capo Montanari
- Luca Lionello: Avv. Giacomo Marzi
- Rodolfo Bigotti: Riccardo Valeri
- Antonia Liskova: Yrina Fischer
- Gianni Garko: Martin Fischer
- Toni Bertorelli: Proc. Capo Riva
- Maurizio Aiello: Commissario Magnani
- Stefano Molinari: Procuratore Roggi
- Franco Castellano: Michele Sacerdoti
- Fiorenza Marchegiani: Avv. Elena Davino
- Giorgio Lupano: Umberto Arcalli
- Violante Placido: Anna Giusti
- Mirko Casaburo: Matteo Cosentino
- Tiziana Sensi: Adriana
- Caterina Vertova: Luisa Arcalli

== See also ==
- List of Italian television series
