= Claudio Gregori =

Italian comedian, actor and musician (born 1963)

- Gregori in 2013
- Born: 17 November 1963 (age 62); Rome, Italy
- Occupations: Comedian, actor, musician, singer, screenwriter, director, cartoonist
- Years active: 1978–present

Claudio Gregori (born 17 November 1963), also known simply as Greg, is an Italian comedian, actor, musician, singer, screenwriter and cartoonist. He is best known as one half of the comedy duo Lillo & Greg, alongside Lillo Petrolo, with whom he has worked in television, radio, theatre, film and music.

== Life and career ==
Gregori was born in Rome, Italy. He began performing music in the late 1970s and started working as a cartoonist in 1985. He created characters which appeared on Italian comics including Lupo Alberto, Cattivik and Sturmtruppen. In 1986, he met Pasquale Petrolo while working for a publishing house and, in 1992, they founded Latte & i Suoi Derivati, a band combining rock music with satirical lyrics and comedy. He also performed in other groups, exploring genres such as blues, swing, rockabilly and doo-wop.

His film appearances in the Lillo & Greg's filmography include Bagnomaria (1999), Blek Giek (2001), Colpi di fulmine (2012), Colpi di fortuna (2013), Un Natale stupefacente (2014), Natale col boss (2015) and Natale a Londra – Dio salvi la regina (2016). In 2020, they debuted as directors with the comedy film D.N.A.: Decisamente non adatti.

In 2001, he played police officer Amedeo in Marco Risi's comedy film Three Wives, one of his early major roles outside the duo. He later appeared in the short film Metodo (2007), directed by Chiara Sani, in which he played an unsettling customer. He has also worked as a voice actor, voicing Grub in the Italian version of the animated film Epic (2013) and Barry in Early Man (2018).

In later years, Gregori appeared in films including Old Rascals (2022), algonside Lino Banfi, Imperfetti criminali (2022), in which he played the jeweller Meier, Rido perché ti amo (2023) and 30 anni di meno (2024), in which he played one of the three leads alongside Massimo Ghini and Antonio Catania.

== Filmography ==
Film
| Year | Title | Role |
|---|---|---|
| 1999 | Bagnomaria | Man in Black |
| 2001 | Three Wives | Amedeo |
| 2001 | Blek Giek | Flaminio |
| 2007 | Lillo e Greg: The Movie! | Greg |
| 2012 | Colpi di fulmine | Ermete Maria Grilli |
| 2013 | Colpi di fortuna | Walter Biffi |
| 2014 | Un Natale stupefacente | Oscar |
| 2015 | Natale col boss | Dino |
| 2016 | Natale a Londra – Dio salvi la regina | Prisco |
| 2020 | D.N.A.: Decisamente non adatti | Ezechiele |
| 2022 | Imperfetti criminali | Meier |
| 2022 | Gli idoli delle donne | Max |
| 2022 | Old Rascals | Renny |
| 2023 | A Freaking Wedding! | Dr. Frankenstein |
| 2023 | Rido perché ti amo | Cipriano |
| 2024 | 30 anni di meno | Maurizio |
| 2025 | Incanto | Max |
