= Volfango De Biasi =

Italian director and screenwriter (born 1972)

- Born: 22 February 1972 (age 54); Rome, Italy
- Occupations: Director; Screenwriter

Volfango De Biasi (born 22 February 1972) is an Italian director and screenwriter. He specializes in comedy films.

== Life and career ==
Born in Rome, De Biasi studied acting in Paris and Los Angeles, and in 1994 he made his professional acting debut in the indie drama film Movimenti. He then focused on directing, and directed a number of commercials, music videos, shorts and documentaries.

After directing a segment of the anthology film Esercizi di stile, De Biasi had his breakout in 2007 with the teen comedy Come tu mi vuoi, which got a large commercial success.

== Filmography ==
- Come tu mi vuoi (2007)
- Iago (2009)
- Un Natale stupefacente (2014)
- Natale col Boss (2015)
- Natale a Londra – Dio salvi la regina (2016)
- Nessuno come noi (2018)
- L'agenzia dei bugiardi (2019)
- Help! My In-Laws Are Vampires! (2021)
- A Freaking Wedding! (2023)
- In fuga con Babbo Natale (2023)
- Make a Wish (2025)
- Il malloppo (2026)
