= Luigi De Laurentiis =

Italian film producer (1917–1992)

Luigi Agostino Alfredo De Laurentiis (16 February 1917, in Torre Annunziata – 30 March 1992, in Rome) was an Italian film producer. His credits include Un borghese piccolo piccolo (director Mario Monicelli, 1977), Amici miei – Atto II (director Mario Monicelli, 1982), Vacanze di Natale (director Carlo Vanzina, 1983) and Donne con le gonne (director Francesco Nuti, 1991).

== Life ==
After graduating in law, he became involved in the film industry through the prodding of his younger brother Dino and assisted Dino in the production of The Bandit. He was film editor on Le notti di Cabiria by Federico Fellini (1957) and after a short spell with fellow Italians Eduardo De Filippo and Totò, he then worked beside Dino for twenty years until Dino's move to the US. He also co-owned Filmauro with his son Aurelio and his other brother Alfredo. In the 1960s and 1970s, he taught film production at Italy's Istituto Professionale di Stato per la Cinematografia e la Televisione.
