= The Big Score (2016 film) =

- Italian: L'abbiamo fatta grossa
- Directed by: Carlo Verdone
- Written by: Carlo Verdone; Pasquale Plastino; Massimo Gaudioso
- Produced by: Aurelio De Laurentiis; Luigi De Laurentiis Jr.
- Starring: Carlo Verdone; Antonio Albanese
- Cinematography: Arnaldo Catinari
- Music by: Andrea Farri
- Production company: Filmauro
- Distributed by: Universal Pictures
- Release date: 28 January 2016
- Running time: 112 minutes
- Country: Italy
- Language: Italian
- Box office: US$6.5 million

The Big Score (Italian: L'abbiamo fatta grossa) is a 2016 Italian comedy film written, directed and starred by Carlo Verdone.

It was released on 28 January 2016.

== Plot ==
Arturo Merlin, an ex-carabiniere turned a private investigator, is reduced to take jobs like finding cats and dogs, and is hired by Yuri Pelagatti, a stage actor, to investigate his wife.

== Cast ==
- Carlo Verdone as Arturo Merlino
- Antonio Albanese as Yuri Pelagatti
- Anna Kasyan as Lena
- Clotilde Sabatino as Carla
- Francesca Fiume as Giorgia
- Massimo Popolizio as Conversani
- Virginia Da Brescia as aunt Elide
- Mino Caprio as Father Domenico
- Eugenio Krauss as the Police Inspector
- Simona Caparrini as the stage actress
