= Nicola Rignanese =

Italian actor and comedian (born 1965)

- Born: 6 December 1965 (age 60); Foggia, Italy
- Occupations: Actor, comedian
- Years active: 1990–present

Nicola Rignanese (born 6 December 1965) is an Italian actor and comedian.

== Life and career ==
In 1991, Rignanese graduated from the Paolo Grassi School of Dramatic Arts of Milan, where he studied alongside Antonio Albanese. Together, they performed as comedians at tourist villages in Apulia, between Vieste and Peschici. After graduation, he began his career as a stage actor.

His film debut came in 1990 with Italia-Germania 4-3, directed by Andrea Barzini. In 1996, he was cast by director Carlo Mazzacurati in the film Vesna Goes Fast. During the filming, he solidified his strong friendship with Albanese, who later cast him in his directorial debut Freshwater Man. They worked together again in Qualunquemente, Tutto tutto niente niente, and Cetto c'è, senzadubbiamente, all three directed by Giulio Manfredonia.

Rignanese most notably appeared in Little Sea by Alessandro Di Robilant in 2009, La pecora nera by Ascanio Celestini, which premiered at the Venice Film Festival in 2010, and Il paese delle spose infelici by Pippo Mezzapesa in 2011. In 2014, he was directed once again by Manfredonia in Mafia and Red Tomatoes. Five years later, Rignanese starred in the comedy The Most Beautiful Day in the World by Alessandro Siani.

He has acted in many successful television series, including Questo nostro amore, where he played Salvatore Strano, and The Mafia Kills Only in Summer, in which he portrayed Boris Giuliano, the head of the Palermo Mobile Squad. In 2018, Rignanese starred in the FX television series Trust, in the role of crime lord Don Salvatore.

For his role as Adriano Melis in the 2022 film Margins, he was nominated for a Nastro d'Argento for Best Supporting Actor.

== Selected filmography ==
=== Film ===
- Italia-Germania 4-3 (1990)
- Vesna Goes Fast (1996)
- Freshwater Man (1997)
- Two Friends (2002)
- Cuore scatenato (2003)
- Little Sea (2009)
- La pecora nera (2010)
- Qualunquemente (2011)
- Il paese delle spose infelici (2011)
- Tutto tutto niente niente (2012)
- La scuola più bella del mondo (2014)
- Mafia and Red Tomatoes (2014)
- Tonno spiaggiato (2018)
- The Most Beautiful Day in the World (2019)
- Cetto c'è, senzadubbiamente (2019)
- Margins (2022)
- Where Life Begins (2022)
- Thank You Guys (2023)
- A Hundred Sundays (2023)
- Come può uno scoglio (2023)
- Her Second Chance (2024)

=== TV series ===
- Questo nostro amore (2012–2018)
- Squadra antimafia – Palermo oggi (2013)
- The Young Montalbano (2015)
- The Mafia Kills Only in Summer (2016)
- Cacciatore: The Hunter (2018)
- Trust (2018)
- Thou Shalt Not Kill (2018)
- The Ladies' Paradise (2018–2021)
- Bang Bang Baby (2022)
- The Good Mothers (2023)
- The Lions of Sicily (2023)
