= Paolo Buonvino =

Composer, conductor and music arranger

- Born: 29 March 1968 (age 58); Scordia, Sicily, Italy
- Occupations: Composer; musician; conductor; music arranger
- Website: www.paolobuonvino.com

Paolo Buonvino (born 29 March 1968) is an Italian composer, musician, conductor, and music arranger.

== Life and career ==
Buonvino was born on 29 March 1968 in Scordia, a town in Sicily, Italy. He earned his Piano Bachelor-Degree from the Conservatorio Francesco Cilea in Reggio Calabria and a Master-Degree in Music Disciplines from the University of Bologna.

In the late 1990s, he began to compose film scores and in 1999 he won the Cam/Rota Prize.

In 2008 he won a David di Donatello for best score and a Nastro d'Argento in the same category for the film Quiet Chaos.

In 2009 he won a second Nastro d'Argento for the score of the film Italians.

After that ground-breaking exploit, the musician started collaboration with Italian Film Director Gabriele Muccino, known for The Pursuit of Happyness (2006) starring Will Smith and Seven Pounds (2018), again starring Will Smith alongside Rosario Dawson, Woody Harrelson, and Barry Pepper.

For Muccino, Paolo Buonvino wrote the scores for some of the movies that would not only become colossal hits at the Italian box-office but generational phenomena, considered modern classics: Ecco fatto (1998); Come te nessuno mai (But forever in My Mind) (1999), L'ultimo bacio (The Last Kiss) (2001); Ricordati di me (Remember Me, My Love) (2003); Baciami ancora (Kiss Me Again) (2010); and the American production of Fathers & Daughters (2015), starring Russell Crowe, Amanda Seyfried, Kylie Rogers alongside Jane Fonda and Octavia Spencer.

Throughout the years the artist confronted himself also with the pop/rock arena writing music for international artists of the caliber of Dolores'O Riordan, leader of The Cranberries and Skin, former leader of Skunk Anansie; and other Italian singers including Andrea Bocelli; Carmen Consoli; Elisa; Jovanotti and Fiorella Mannoia.

Paolo Buonvino collaborated on productions in France for the movies Je reste! (I'm Staying!) (2003) with Sophie Marceau and Vincent Perez; Ma mère est folle (My Mother is Crazy) (2018) with Fanny Ardant, directed by Diane Kurys and Les Estivants (The Summer House) (2018), directed by Valeria Bruni Tedeschi. In 2012, he scored the Canadian-British production of If I Were You comedy-drama from Joan Carr-Wiggin starring Marcia Gay Harden, Leonor Watling and Aidan Quinn.

Moreover, Buonvino wrote the score for the U.S. Netflix TV hit series Medici: Masters of Florence and Medici: The Magnificent (2016/2019), created by Frank Spotnitz and Nicholas Meyer and produced by Lux Vide and HBO.

In 2020, he composed the score for the faith-based drama film Fátima directed by Marco Pontecorvo, starring Harvey Keitel and Sônia Braga alongside Joaquim de Almeida, Goran Visnjic, and Lúcia Moniz. A special guest star on the score is Italian opera tenor Andrea Bocelli who sings the movie's lead theme "Gratia plena". Both the score and the song are official entries for the 2021 93rd Academy Awards in the categories "Best Original Score" and "Best Original Song".

In July 2021 Taranta Reimagined is released, a recording project of contamination between popular music and electronic music, produced by Sugar Music and distributed by Universal Music. The disc features original interpretations by Jovanotti, Mahmood, Gianna Nannini and Diodato recorded during the 2020 edition of the Notte della Taranta.

In 2021, the Biennale Musica di Venezia commissions him a project that sees the light of day in September 2022 at the Teatro alle Tese in Venice, entitled "Çiatu"; a concert for reciting voices, three disklaviers and electronic music, with the art installation by Irma Blank, performed by the Parco della Musica Contemporanea Ensemble orchestra, conducted by Tonino Battista.

Between 2022 and 2023 he wrote the soundtracks for the first and second seasons of the television series A casa tutti bene - La serie and Incastrati, directed by Ficarra and Picone.

In 2023, the Teatro Massimo in Palermo staged the ballet Anna, choreographed by Vincenzo Veneruso. The production focuses on the theme of gender-based violence, with a score composed entirely of pieces from Buonvino's repertoire. The ballet was revived in May 2025.

In 2025, he composed the soundtrack for the Netflix television series The Leopard, directed by Tom Shankland. That same year, he launched the concert tour La musica oltre le storie (Music Beyond Stories), which traveled through major Italian cities, including Rome, Florence, Bologna, and Vicenza. The tour included Sicilian stops in April 2026 at the Teatro Pirandello in Agrigento and the Teatro Garibaldi in Enna. In the spring of 2026, he released the live album of the same name.

== Soundtracks ==
=== Cinema ===
- Ecco fatto, directed by Gabriele Muccino (1998)
- But Forever in My Mind directed by Gabriele Muccino (1999)
- Lost Lover, directed by Roberto Faenza (1999)
- Der Kardinal – directed by Berthold Mittermayr (1999)
- Dancing North – directed by Paolo Quaregna (1999)
- The Last Kiss, directed by Gabriele Muccino (2000)
- di famiglia (film 2015) Segreti di Famiglia (Laguna, original title) – directed by Dennis Berry (2001)
- Remember Me, My Love, directed by Gabriele Muccino (2003)
- Life as It Comes, directed by Stefano Incerti (2003)
- Five Moons Square, directed by Renzo Martinelli (2003)
- On My Skin, directed by Valerio Jalongo (2003)
- Je Reste – Directed by Diane Kurys (2003)
- Apnea, directed by Roberto Dordit (2005)
- Manual of Love, directed by Giovanni Veronesi (2005)
- Romanzo Criminale, directed by Michele Placido (2005)
- Il fantasma di Corleone – Directed by Marco Amenta (2006)^{[1]}
- Napoleon and Me, directed by Paolo Virzì (2006)
- My Best Enemy, directed by Carlo Verdone (2006 )
- Concrete Romance, directed by Marco Martani (2007)^{[2]}
- I Vicerè, directed by Roberto Faenza (2007)
- Manual of Love 2, directed by Giuseppe Veronesi (2007)
- Quiet Chaos, directed by Antonello Grimaldi (2008)
- La matassa, directed by Ficarra e Picone e Giambattista Avellino e Vincenzo Cavalli (2009)^{[3]}
- Italians, directed by Giovanni Veronesi (2009)
- Kiss Me Again, directed by Gabriele Muccino (2010)^{[4]}
- School Is Over – Directed by Valerio Jalongo 2010
- The Ages of Love, directed by Giovanni Veronesi (2011)
- It May Be Love But It Doesn't Show, directed by Ficarra e Picone (2011)
- One Day More, directed by Massimo Venier (2011)
- Silvio Forever – Directed by Roberto Faenza, Filippo Marcelloni (2011)^{[5]}
- Tutto Tutto Niente Niente, directed by Giulio Manfredonia (2012)
- Terramatta, directed by Costanza Quatriglio (2012) – documentary film
- If I Were You – Directed by Joan Carr Wiggin starring Marcia Gay Harden (2012)^{[6]}
- Un Uccello Molto Serio – Directed by Lorenza Indovina (2013)^{[7]}
- Con il fiato sospeso, directed by Costanza Quatriglio (2013)
- Guess Who's Coming for Christmas?, directed by Fausto Brizzi (2013)
- Il Natale della mamma imperfetta, directed by Ivan Cotroneo (2013)
- Mi rifaccio vivo, directed by Sergio Rubini (2013)
- L'Abbraccio Definitivo – Directed by Stefania Rocca (2014)
- Unique Brothers – Directed by Alessio Maria Federici (2014)^{[8]}
- La scuola più bella del mondo – Directed by Luca Miniero (2014)^{[9]}
- Anita B., directed by Roberto Faenza (2014)^{[10]}
- Fathers and Daughters, directed by Gabriele Muccino (2015)
- 7 minuti – Directed by Michele Placido (2016)^{[11]}
- Ma mère est folle – Directed by Diane Kurys (2018)^{[12]}
- The Summer House (Les estivants) – Directed by Valeria Bruni Tedeschi (2019)^{[13]}
- Fatima, directed by Marco Pontecorvo (2020)^{[14]}
- Burraco fatale di Giuliana Gamba (2020)

=== TV series ===
- La piovra 8 - Lo scandalo, directed by Giacomo Battiato (1997) –
- La piovra 9 - Il patto, directed by Giacomo Battiato (1998) –
- L'elefante bianco, directed by Gianfranco Albano (1998) –
- Caraibi, directed by Lamberto Bava (1999) –
- Una Farfalla nel Cuore – Directed by Giuliana Gamba (1999) – fiction TV Rai1
- Padre Pio: Miracle Man, directed by Carlo Carlei (2000)
- L'impero, directed by Lamberto Bava (2001) –
- Il giovane Casanova, directed by Giacomo Battiato (2002) – film TV
- Cuore di Donna – Directed by Franco Bernini – (2002) fiction TV Rai1
- Ferrari, directed by Carlo Carlei (2003)
- Mio figlio, directed by Luciano Odorisio (2004) –
- Paolo Borsellino, regia si Gianluca Maria Tavarelli (2004) –
- Una famiglia in giallo, directed by Alberto Simone (2005) –
- Fuga per la libertà – L'aviatore – Directed by Carlo Carlei (2008) – fiction TV (canale5)^{[15]}
- Il commissario Manara, directed by Davide Marengo e Luca Libuori (2009–2011)
- 4 padri single, directed by Paolo Monico (2009) – film TV, featuring Emanuele Bossi
- Io e mio figlio, nuove storie per il commissario Vivaldi, directed by Luciano Odorisio (2010) –
- Il commissario Manara 2 – Directed by Luca Ribuoli (2011) – fiction TV rai1
- Una mamma imperfetta – Directed by Ivan Cotroneo (2013) –
- Sotto copertura, directed by Giulio Manfredonia (2015) –
- Tutto può Succedere – Directed by Lucio Pellegrini, Alessandro Casale (2015) – fiction (Rai1)^{[16]}
- Medici: Masters of Florence, directed by Sergio Mimica-Gezzan (2016) –
- Sotto copertura – La cattura di Zagaria, directed by Giulio Manfredonia (2017) – ^{[17]}
- Tutto può succedere 2 – Directed by Lucio Pellegrini, Alessandro Angelini (2017) – fiction (Rai1)^{[18]}
- Questo nostro amore 80 – Directed by Isabella Leoni, Luca Ribuoli – (2018) – fiction (Rai1)^{[19]}
- Tutto può succedere 3 – Directed by Alessandro Casale, Lucio Pellegrini (2018) – fiction (Rai1)^{[20]}
- Medici: The Magnificent – Directed by Jon Cassar, Jan Maria Michelini (2018) – (Rai1)^{[21]}
- I Medici 3 : Nel nome della famiglia – Directed by Christian Duguay (2019) – (Rai1)^{[22]}
- Buongiorno, mamma!, regia di Giulio Manfredonia (2021- 2023)
- A casa tutti bene - La serie (2021-2023) - TV series -first and second season
- Incastrati, regia di Ficarra e Picone (2022-2023) - TV series - first and second season
- The Leopard (2025)

== Discography collaborations ==
- Franco Battiato, il cavaliere dell'intelletto (1994)
- Carmen Consoli, Elettra (2009), Eva contro Eva (2006), L'eccezione (2002), L'anfiteatro e la bambina impertinente, (live 2001), Stato di necessità (2000),
- Patrizia Laquidara, Noite e Luar (single 2007)
- Elisa, Ecco che (single 2013), Eppure Sentire (single 2007)
- Fiorella Mannoia, Sud (2012) A te (2013),
- Negramaro "tutto puo succedere"
- Dolores O'Riordan "senza fiato"
- Jovanotti, Baciami ancora (single 2010), Ora (album – 2011), Lorenzo in Concerto – Live Taormina Teatro Antico (2012)
- Skin, Renaissance (single 2016)
- Andrea Bocelli "Gratia plena"
- Jovanotti, Mahmood, Gianna Nannini and Diodato - Taranta reimagined (2021)

== Prizes and awards ==
In 1999 at the 56th Venice film fest he was awarded the "Rota" prize (collateral prizes) for the music of But Forever in My Mind (directed by Gabriele Muccino)

At the Festival International de Luchon (2002) he received the award for the best soundtrack with the film "the young Casanova".

Since 2000, he has received seven nominations

In 2008 the award as best musician to "David di Donatello" with the film Quiet Chaos (directed by Antonello Grimaldi)

In 2009 he received the Nastro d'Argento for Best Score in Taormina with the film Italians (by Giovanni Veronesi).
