= Marco Paolini =

Italian stage actor, theatre director, dramaturge and author

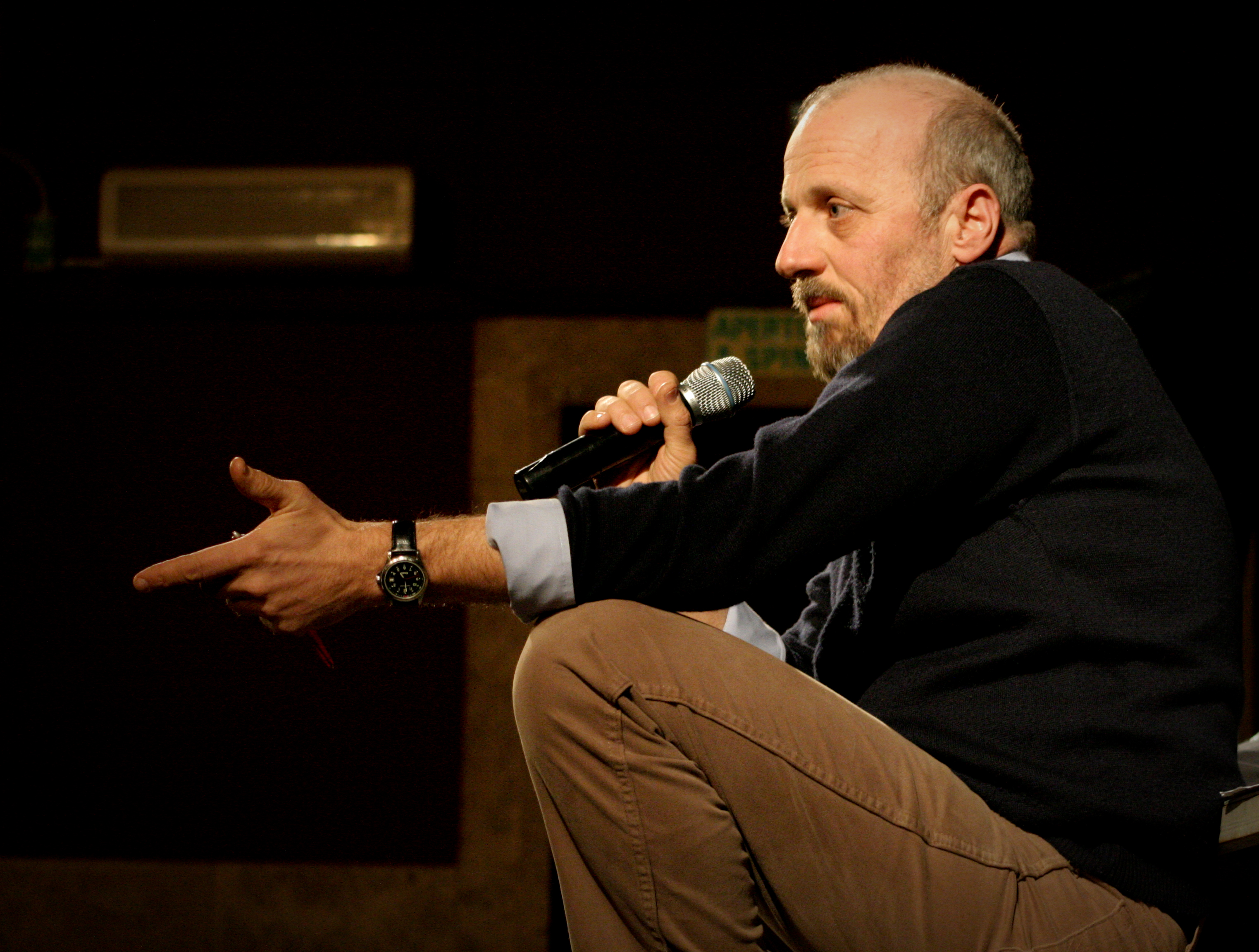
- Born: 5 March 1956 (age 70); Belluno, Veneto, Italy
- Occupations: Stage actor, theatre director, dramaturge and author
- Writing career
- Genres: Narrative theatre Civil theatre
- Website: www.jolefilm.com

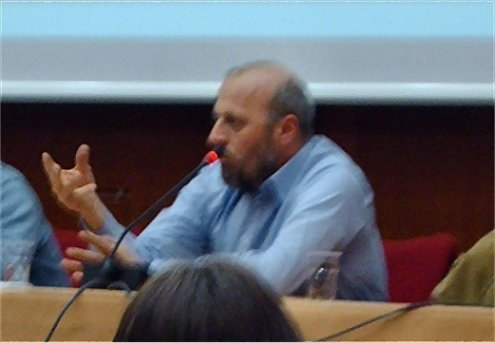
Marco Paolini, 2008

Marco Paolini (born 5 March 1956) is an Italian stage actor, theatre director, dramaturge and author.

== Personal background ==
Paolini is the son of a railroad engineer and a housewife from Belluno, Italy. In the 1970s, he moved to Treviso and started working in theatre.

== Professional background ==
Paolini's repertory includes civil theatre. His performances usually consist of monologues with frequent use of the Venetian language, irony and satire. Inspired by Dario Fo, he is an Italian exponent of narrative theatre.

Until 1994, Paolini worked with various theatre groups, including Teatro degli Stracci, Studio 900 of Treviso, Tag Teatro of Mestre in Venice and Laboratorio Teatro Settimo. In 1995, received the Ubu Prize for writing Il racconto del Vajont (translated: The Vajont Tale), which was dedicated to the disaster of the Vajont Dam in Italy. The ceremony aired on Rai 2 Italian television.

Since 1999, he has produced his own works with his company JoleFilm. He has also collaborated with the Italian folk band I Mercanti di Liquore, along with the lead singer, Lorenzo Monguzzi.

=== Theatre ===
- Album teatrali (five tales from 1987 to 1999)
- Il racconto del Vajont (1994)
- Appunti forestali (1996)
- Il milione – Quaderno veneziano di Marco Paolini (1997)
- Appunti foresti dal Milione quaderno veneziano (2002)
- I Bestiari (four tales from 1998 to 1999)
- I-TIGI Canto per Ustica (dedicated to the Ustica Massacre) (2000)
- Parlamento chimico – Storie di plastica (2001)
- Song no. 32 (2003)
- Karma-Kola (2006)
- Teatro Civico, sei monologhi per Report (six tales, 2003)
- Album dal teatro alla televisione (13 tales, 2005)

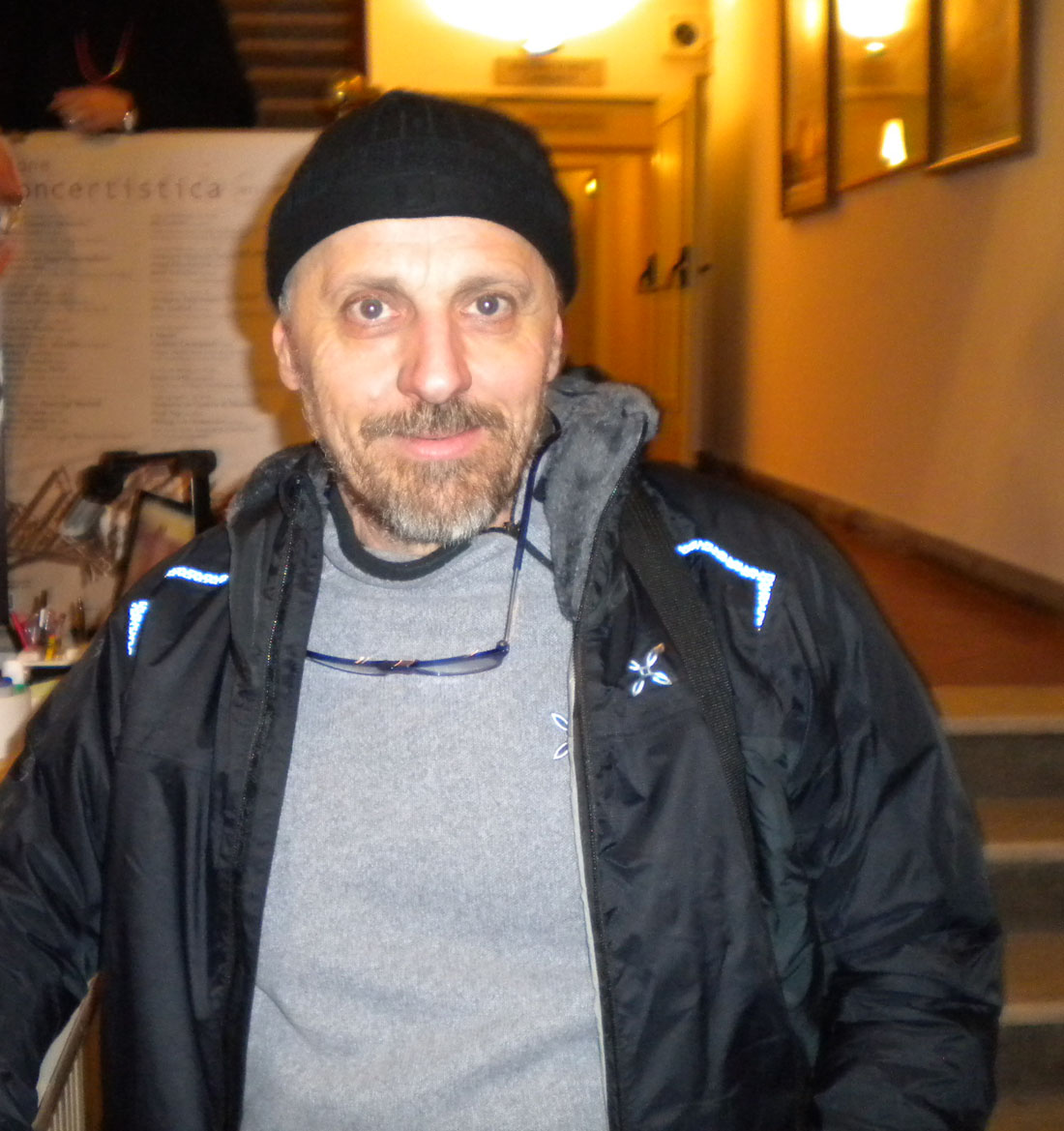
Marco Paolini after the piece ITIS Galileo in Teatro Ponchielli of Cremona, jan., 11th, 2012.

- Miserabili – Io e Margaret Thatcher (2007)
- Il Sergente (inspired by Il sergente nella neve (1953) by Mario Rigoni Stern) (2007)
- Album d'Aprile (2008)
- La macchina del capo (Racconto di Capodanno) (2009)
- Ausmerzen (2012)
- Itis Galileo (2012)

=== Filmography ===
- Manila Paloma Blanca – Daniele Segre (1992)
- Caro diario – Nanni Moretti (1993)
- The Bull – Carlo Mazzacurati (1995)
- Little Teachers – Daniele Luchetti (1998)
- Ritratti: Mario Rigoni Stern – C. Mazzacurati and M. Paolini (1999)
- Holy Tongue – Carlo Mazzacurati (2000)
- Vivere – Franco Bernini (2001)
- A cavallo della tigre – Carlo Mazzacurati (2002)

=== Discography ===
- Marco Paolini legge Ernesto Calzavara (2001)
- Sputi, with the "Mercanti di Liquore" (2004)
- Marcovaldo di Calvino letto da Paolini (Audiobook with "L'espresso") (2006)
- Miserabili with the "Mercanti di Liquore" (2008)

== Bibliography ==
- Presotto, Carlo. L'isola e i teatri, Bulzoni (2001)
- Cannella, Claudia. "Dossier Teatro di Narrazione," in Hystrio (2005)
- Guccini, Gerardo. La bottega dei narratori, Rome: Dino Audino editore (2005)
- Soriani, Simone. "Dario Fo, il teatro di narrazione, la nuova performance epica. Per una genealogia di un quasi-genere," in Forum Italicum (2005)
- Perissinotto, Cristina. "Polo, Paolini e Venezia: riflessioni lagunari," in Italica (2005)
