= The Handsome Priest =

1989 film

- Directed by: Carlo Mazzacurati
- Written by: Franco Bernini; Carlo Mazzacurati; Enzo Monteleone
- Produced by: Valerio De Paolis
- Starring: Roberto Citran
- Cinematography: Giuseppe Lanci
- Edited by: Mirco Garrone
- Music by: Fiorenzo Carpi
- Release date: 1989
- Language: Italian

The Handsome Priest (Italian: Il prete bello, French: Les P'tits Vélos) is a 1989 coming-of-age drama film co-written and directed by Carlo Mazzacurati. A co-production between Italy and France, it premiered at the 46th Venice International Film Festival, in the Venice International Film Critics' Week sidebar.

== Cast ==
- Massimo Santelia as Sergio
- Davide Torsello as Cena
- Roberto Citran as Don Gastone
- Adriana Asti as Immacolata
- Jessica Forde as Fedora
- Marco Messeri as Nello Pannocchieschi
- Amy Werba as Sergio's mother
- Raoul Billerey as Sergio's grandfather
- Antonio Petrocelli as Tiziano
- Silvana De Santis as Camilla Brigenti
- Luisa De Santis as Wanda Brigenti
- Sergio Vastano as Brusanti

== Production ==
The film is based on the novel Il prete bello by Goffredo Parise. It was shot in the early 1989 in nine weeks between Vicenza and its surrounding area. The roles of Sergio and Cena required four months of auditions, with about 18,000 children being auditioned. It had a budget of about 3 billion lire.

== Release ==
The film premiered in the Venice International Film Critics' Week sidebar at the 46th edition of the Venice Film Festival.

== Reception ==
A contemporary Variety review described the film as "a hymn to friendship and the golden age of childhood, [...] which trusts on emotion in the place of realism." La Stampa's film critic Lietta Tornabuoni described the film as characterized by "a terse style, often punctuated by humorous moments, as tender and subdued as a childhood memory", and noted: "whilst Carlo Mazzacurati’s debut film, Italian Night, was more personal, intriguing and unusual, The Handsome Priest demonstrates his growth as a director in terms of style, command of the material and visual choices." In a retrospective analysis, Laura Rascaroli argued the film "shows some progress towards Mazzacurati's reappropriation of his native landscape, but the aestheticized result was still far from the authentic yet idiosyncratic perspective of his later films."
