= Marco Messeri =

Italian actor, comedian, stage director, singer-songwriter and voice actor

- Born: 15 December 1948 (age 77); Livorno
- Occupations: Actor, comedian, stage director, singer-songwriter, voice actor
- Height: 1.73 m (5 ft 8 in)

Marco Messeri (born 15 December 1948) is an Italian actor, comedian, stage director, singer-songwriter and voice actor.

== Life and career ==
Born in Livorno, Messeri studied painting at the Accademia di Belle Arti di Firenze and acting at the drama school of the Piccolo Teatro in Milan.

He debuted on stage in 1969, in Paolo Poli's Il Brasile.

After several supporting roles, in 1987 he debuted in a leading role in Carlo Mazzacurati's Notte italiana, winning a Globo d'oro for best new actor. The same year, he received a Ciak d'oro for best supporting actor thanks to his performance in Massimo Troisi's Le vie del Signore sono finite.

In 1995 he won a Nastro d'Argento for best supporting actor for his performance in Francesca Archibugi's Con gli occhi chiusi.

Messeri is also a singer-songwriter and composer of songs, usually used in his stage works.

== Selected filmography ==
- La locandiera (1980)
- I'm Starting from Three (1981)
- Il paramedico (1982)
- The Mass Is Ended (1985)
- Le vie del Signore sono finite (1987)
- Italian Night (1987)
- Red Wood Pigeon (1989)
- The Handsome Priest (1989)
- Captain Fracassa's Journey (1990)
- Alberto Express (1990)
- Pensavo fosse amore, invece era un calesse (1991)
- With Closed Eyes (1994)
- The Bull (1994)
- Camerieri (1995)
- A Cold, Cold Winter (1996)
- Vesna Goes Fast (1996)
- A spasso nel tempo (1996)
- A spasso nel tempo – L'avventura continua (1997)
- Simpatici & antipatici (1998)
- My Dearest Friends (1998)
- Padre Pio: Between Heaven and Earth (2000)
- Nightwatchman (2000)
- Maria Goretti (2003)
- Sunday Lunch (2003)
- An Italian Romance (2004)
- The Jokes (2004)
- Do You Know Claudia? (2004)
- La seconda volta non si scorda mai (2008)
- La passione (2010)
- The First Beautiful Thing (2010)
- Mary of Nazareth (2012)
- The Unlikely Prince (2013)
- L'arbitro (2013)
- Fuga di cervelli (2013)
- Good for Nothing (2014)
- Like Crazy (2016)
- Marilyn's Eyes (2021)
- Da grandi (2023)
- Make a Wish (2025)
