= On My Skin =

On My Skin may refer to:

- On My Skin (2003 film), an Italian crime-drama film
- On My Skin (2018 film), an Italian drama film
