= Roberto Citran =

Italian actor (born 1955)

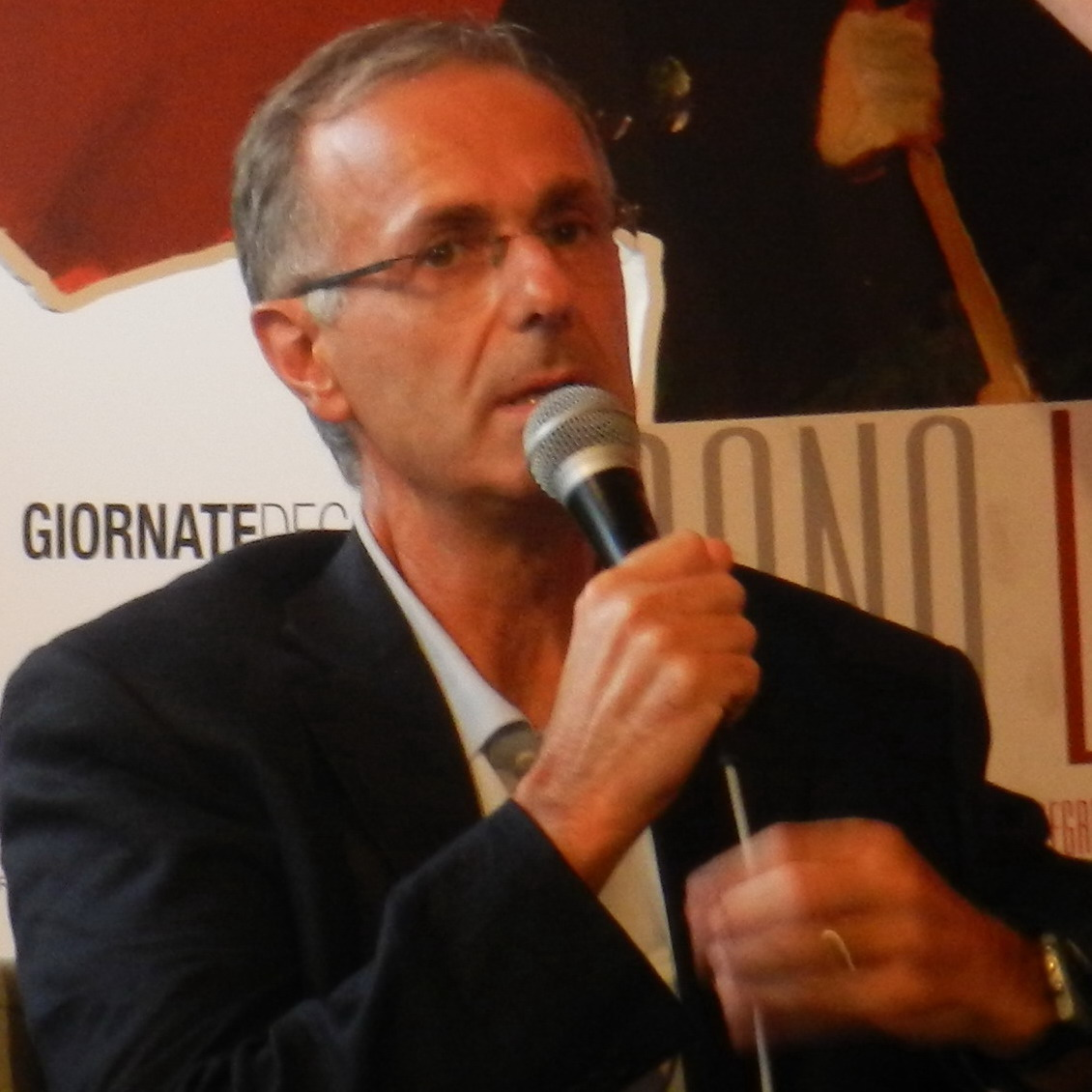
- Citran in 2011
- Born: 26 January 1955 (age 71); Padua, Italy
- Occupation: actor
- Height: 1.78 m (5 ft 10 in)

Roberto Citran (born 26 January 1955) is an Italian actor.

== Life and career ==
Born in Padua, Citran graduated in psychology and founded the university film club CinemaUno. After some sporadic stage works he founded a small theater company, "Punto e Virgola".

Citran is best known for his films with fellow Paduan director Carlo Mazzacurati, who in 1989 got him his first main role in The Handsome Priest.

In 1994, Citran won a Volpi Cup for best supporting actor for his performance in Mazzacurati's The Bull.

== Selected filmography ==
- Italian Night (1987) - Gábor
- Little Misunderstandings (1989) - Giuliano
- Corsa di primavera (1989) - Il padre di Isacco
- The Handsome Priest (1989) - Don Gastone
- Io, Peter Pan (1989) - Fabio
- The Amusements of Private Life (1990) - Belzé
- Condominio (1991) - Roberto Sgorlon
- Ask for the Moon (1991) - Francesco
- Quattro figli unici (1992) - Giorgio
- Ambrogio (1992) - Leo
- Love Burns (1994) - il marito tradito
- The Bull (1994) - Loris
- Agosto (1994)
- Policemen (1995) - Guido
- Bits and Pieces (1996) - Middle-aged man
- Italiani (1996) - Leonardo
- Marching in Darkness (1996) - Capitano Marsili
- Vesna Goes Fast (1996) - Il cameriere
- Cervellini fritti impanati (1996) - Valerio
- The Truce (1997) - Unverdorben
- The Acrobats (1997) - Ex marito di Elena
- La terza luna (1997) - Luca Fabiani
- La classe non è acqua (1997) - Prof. Guido Marinelli
- Nora (2000) - Roberto Prezioso
- Tobia al caffè (2002) - Giuseppe
- Captain Corelli's Mandolin (2001) - General Gandin
- Paz! (2002) - Professore
- Two Friends (2002) - Negoziante di elettrodomestici
- El Alamein: The Line of Fire (2002) - The Colonel
- A cavallo della tigre (2002)
- The Good Pope: Pope John XXIII (2003, TV Movie) - Monsignor Loris Capovilla
- The Tulse Luper Suitcases, Part 1: The Moab Story (2003)
- The Fugitive (2003) - Massimo's Father
- The Tulse Luper Suitcases, Part 3: From Sark to the Finish (2004) - Raoul Wallenberg
- An Italian Romance (2004) - Alvaro
- Hotel Rwanda (2004) - Priest
- The Life That I Want (2004) - Giordani
- A Life in Suitcases (2005) - Raoul Wallenberg
- 4-4-2 - Il gioco più bello del mondo (2006) - Tricella (segment "Meglio di Maradona")
- Pope John Paul I: The Smile of God (2006)
- I Trust You (2007) - Aleotti
- Flying Lessons (2007) - Stefano - padre di Curry
- 7/8 (2007) - Alberto Molaien
- Night Bus (2007) - Diolaiti
- Detesto l'elettronica stop (2008) - Il Comunista solitario
- Generation 1000 Euros (2009) - Tassista
- The Red Shadows (2009) - Editore Bergonzi
- Nine (2009) - Doctor Rondi
- Scontro di civiltà per un ascensore a Piazza Vittorio (2010) - Professor Marini
- Saint Philip Neri: I Prefer Heaven (2010, TV Movie) - Cardinal Capurso
- Passannante (2011) - Avvocato Tarantini
- Some Say No (2011) - Edmondo Giannotti
- Shun Li and the Poet (2011) - Avvocato
- Il giorno in più (2011) - Ricardi
- Mary of Nazareth (2012, TV Movie) - Joachim
- Zoran, My Nephew the Idiot (2013) - Alfio
- First Snowfall (2013) - Commissario
- Wannabe Widowed (2013) - Fenoglio
- The Chair of Happiness (2013) - The Fishmonger
- Patria (2014) - Giorgio
- Fuori Mira (2014) - Farmacista
- Una nobile causa (2016) - Giulio
- Alex & Co: How to Grow Up Despite Your Parents (2016) - Augusto Ferrari
- Noi eravamo (2017) - Dr. Bassani
- L'ordine delle cose (2017) - Grigoletto
- The Last Prosecco (2017) - Sergio Leonardi
- 1991 (2018)
- Noite mágica (2018) - Vincenzo lo sceneggiatore
- Il grande passo (2019) - Piovesan
- Letto numero 6 (2019)
- I Hate Summer (2020)
- Diabolik (2021)
- The Wedding Days (2022)
- The Great Ambition (2024)
- Conclave (2024) as Cardinal Lombardi
- The Last One for the Road (2025)
