= Holy Tongue =

2000 film

- Directed by: Carlo Mazzacurati
- Written by: Franco Bernini; Umberto Contarello; Carlo Mazzacurati; Marco Pettenello
- Starring: Antonio Albanese; Fabrizio Bentivoglio; Isabella Ferrari; Toni Bertorelli; Ivano Marescotti; Marco Paolini; Giulio Brogi
- Cinematography: Alessandro Pesci
- Music by: Ivano Fossati
- Release date: 8 September 2000 (Venice Film Festival)
- Language: Italian

Holy Tongue (Italian: La lingua del santo) is a 2000 Italian comedy film written and directed by Carlo Mazzacurati. It entered into the main competition at the 57th Venice International Film Festival.

== Cast ==
- Antonio Albanese - Antonio
- Fabrizio Bentivoglio - Willy "Alain Delon"
- Isabella Ferrari - Patrizia
- Toni Bertorelli - Krondano
- Ivano Marescotti - Dr. Ronchitelli
- Marco Paolini - Saint Antonio
- Giulio Brogi - Maritan
- Tying Tiffany - The clerk
