= Tomorrow (2001 film) =

2001 film

- Film poster
- Directed by: Francesca Archibugi
- Written by: Francesca Archibugi
- Produced by: Guido De Laurentiis
- Starring: Marco Baliani
- Cinematography: Luca Bigazzi
- Edited by: Jacopo Quadri
- Music by: Battista Lena
- Production company: Rai Cinema
- Distributed by: Warner Bros. Italia
- Release date: 26 January 2001
- Running time: 88 minutes
- Country: Italy
- Language: Italian

Tomorrow (Italian: Domani) is a 2001 Italian drama film directed by Francesca Archibugi. It was screened in the Un Certain Regard section at the 2001 Cannes Film Festival.

== Cast ==
- Marco Baliani - Paolo Zerenghi
- Ornella Muti - Stefania Zerenghi
- Valerio Mastandrea - Giovanni Moccia
- Ilaria Occhini - Mrs. Moccia
- Patrizia Piccinini - Betty
- James Purefoy - Andrew Spender
- David Bracci - Agostino Zerenghi
- Michèle Moretti - Tina Onofri (as Michela Moretti)
- Margherita Porena - Vale Toppetti
- Niccolò Senni - Filippo Zerenghi
- Silvio Vannucci - Sandro
- Stella Vordemann - Tina's Mother
- Anna Wilson-Jones - Claire
- Paolo Taviani - Minister
