= The Bull (1994 film) =

- Directed by: Carlo Mazzacurati
- Written by: Umberto Contarello; Carlo Mazzacurati; Sandro Petraglia; Stefano Rulli
- Produced by: Mario Cecchi Gori; Vittorio Cecchi Gori
- Starring: Diego Abatantuono; Marco Messeri; Roberto Citran
- Cinematography: Alessandro Pesci
- Edited by: Mirco Garrone
- Music by: Ivano Fossati
- Distributed by: Variety Distribution
- Release date: 1994
- Language: Italian

The Bull (Italian: Il toro) is a 1994 Italian comedy-drama film directed by Carlo Mazzacurati.

The film entered the 51st Venice International Film Festival, where it was awarded with the Silver Lion and the Volpi Cup for best supporting actor (to Roberto Citran).

== Plot ==
Franco, an employee in a cattle farm, is fired due to difficulties facing the company. The blame game between his previous employer and his current one, who are reeling in an obscure bureaucratic hitch, does not allow him to obtain much of the liquidation he is entitled to.

Exasperated and in debt (he is separated and with a young daughter to whom he has to buy expensive braces), one night Franco sneaks into the company's offices to consult his file and finally find out who has to pay him the liquidation. Alarmed by some noises, while trying to hide, he comes across Corinth, a bull capable, thanks to artificial insemination, of earning over a billion lire.

Franco then decides to steal the bull to compensate himself for the damage suffered, with the intention of bringing the animal to Hungary by Sándor, an acquaintance of his who runs, through a cooperative, the largest farm in Europe. He then asks for help from Loris, his best friend, who, initially skeptical, then agrees to accompany him to Hungary in his old tarpaulin truck.

From the beginning, the journey did not appear easy: at the border they count on the help of their mutual friend, Emilio, who turns out not to be at work that very evening. They then take advantage of a Serbian farmer who, forced by the lack of documentation to go back with his load of cattle, agrees to load the bull on one of his wagons and leave it in a remote railway station in the former Yugoslavia.

Reaching the station with Loris's truck, however, they discover that Corinth has been sold to the stationmaster, who intends to slaughter it to feed the hundreds of war refugees who have been accommodated on a train at the station for months. The two, taking advantage of a quarrel between the refugees that distracts the stationmaster, steal the bull and flee towards the Hungarian border.

On the way the old truck breaks down due to a problem with the transmission shaft. As night falls, the two friends head towards a nearby farm where an elderly farmer lives with her young daughter-in-law, whose husband is fighting in the war, and her grandson. Despite the language barrier, a spontaneous, supportive understanding quickly arises among those simple people accustomed to working hard. After dinner and the grandfather and grandson have gone to bed, Franco notices the growing tender attraction between the shy Loris and the young woman and urges them to dance together to the tune of Adriano Celentano's "Il Sole è Spento" ("The Sun Has Gone Out").

Stopped at the Hungarian border because they do not have the veterinary health certificate for the bull, Franco and Loris get to know Renzo Tantini, an ambiguous Italian trader who owns an import-export company on Lake Balaton. With the help of a young local, they cross a river into Hungary and reach the farm of Sándor; however, they soon discover that he is no longer at the head of the cooperative: due to the collapse of communism and the opening of borders, the company was bought by a wealthy English businessman, Mr. Ross. At first the latter seems very interested in buying the bull but, one step away from the conclusion of the deal, he learns that the bull has been stolen and therefore backs out.

Dejected, as the last card, Franco and Loris decide to contact Tantini in the hope that he has enough knowledge to place the bull. The two go to look for him in the middle of the night and track him down in a night club on Lake Balaton, in the company of two prostitutes and two tipsy, shady individuals to whom they propose the deal but from whom they only get to be mocked to the point that a violent fight occurs.

The two find themselves wandering desperately and aimlessly in the desolate and icy Hungarian steppe, with the now bulky bull they no longer know what to do with and without knowing anyone to sell it to. Even the solid friendship between the two seems to shake due to the increasing difficulties encountered. When Corinth begins to feel ill from a hoof infection, the situation seems to definitely worsen. Loris, while Franco sleeps, stops the truck and goes to look for an antibiotic for the bull. Waking up, numb, exasperated and demoralized, Franco even thinks of abandoning the animal but as he is walking away from the truck he hears a ringing of bells and sees an Orthodox church where the faithful are flocking. Having entered, now in desperation, Franco begins to cry, consoled by a woman who speaks to him in Hungarian, a language he cannot understand. After leaving the church, Franco is approached by a man on a moped who takes him to a farm where he finds Loris and where the bull is receiving treatment. The two contemplate leaving the animal to the breeders and returning home but Corinth is a very famous bull in the environment and the breeders have recognized it; Franco and Loris begin to fear that the farmers want to call the police and report them. The breeders, on the other hand, offer him a providential, profitable agreement: to exchange the bull for 300 calves.

Franco and Loris rediscover their old friendship and, after loading the calves on a train, they return to Italy to start a new life.

== Cast ==
- Diego Abatantuono: Franco
- Marco Messeri: Tantini
- Roberto Citran: Loris
- Marco Paolini: Danilo
- Ugo Conti: Antonio
- Alberto Lattuada: Colombani
