= Padre Pio: Miracle Man =

2000 Italian television miniseries directed by Carlo Carlei

- North American DVD cover
- Based on: Padre Pio: Man of Hope by Renzo Allegri (it)
- Written by: Massimo De Rita; Mario Falcone; Carlo Carlei
- Directed by: Carlo Carlei
- Starring: Sergio Castellitto
- Composer: Paolo Buonvino
- Country of origin: Italy
- Original language: Italian

Production
- Producer: Angelo Rizzoli
- Cinematography: Gino Sgreva
- Editor: Claudio Di Mauro
- Running time: 206 min. 159 min (DVD cut edition)

Original release
- Network: Canale 5
- Release: 17 April – 19 April 2000

Padre Pio: Miracle Man (Italian: Padre Pio) is a 2000 Italian television movie directed by Carlo Carlei. The film is based on the book Padre Pio: Man of Hope by Renzo Allegri and it depicts real life events of Roman Catholic friar and later Saint Pio of Pietrelcina. The film was presented in two parts. The first part aired on 17 April 2000 while the second part aired on 19 April 2000.

== Plot ==
On 22 September 1968, the old Padre Pio is about to die in San Giovanni Rotondo, Apulia. Shortly after midnight, a mysterious Cardinal arrives come to disturb Padre Pio and taunt him with all the shortcomings of the friar during his lifetime, especially during the 50th anniversary of Pio's stigmata. Padre Pio then takes the moment to tell the Cardinal about his consecrated life, starting from childhood.

In 1895, the 8-year-old Francesco (Padre Pio) encountered God for the first time in his hometown of Campania (Pietrelcina). At the same time, he was also besieged and tormented by the Devil, who manifested himself in the shape of a black dog. After a few miracles, Francesco became a novice and went first to Molise, then to Pietrelcina (his hometown), and then to San Giovanni Rotondo. He also received the stigmata from God for his faithfulness, and in a convent in Apulia he decided to stay for life. Immediately, his fame grows throughout Italy, but the Vatican thinks that the stigmata are false and condemns Padre Pio. But the crowd of faithful is growing, and at the end of the story, the Pope decides to change his mind.

== Cast ==
- Sergio Castellitto as Pio
  - Loris Pazienza as 8-year-old Pio
  - Elio Germano as 16-year-old Pio
- Jürgen Prochnow as The Apostolic Visitator
- Lorenza Indovina as Cleonice
- Pierfrancesco Favino as Emanuele Brunatto
- Flavio Insinna as Father Paolino
- Raffaele Castria as Father Agostino of San Marco in Lamis
- Anita Zagaria as Pio's Mother
- Adolfo Lastretti as Father Raffaele
- Andrea Buscemi as The Superior
- Franco Trevisi as Bishop of Manfredonia
- Renato Marchetti as Father Pellegrino
- Pietro Biondi as Senior Prelate
- Gianni Bonagura as Father Benedetto
- Roberto Chevalier as Father Agostino Gemelli
- Rosa Pianeta as Carmela Morcaldi
- Tosca D'Aquino as Lea Padovani
- Mario Erpichini as Monsignor Macchi
- Camillo Milli as Monsignor Pannullo
- Andrea Tidona as Doctor

== Production ==
The film was filmed between November 1999 and February 2000 in San Giovanni Rotondo, Nepi and Oriolo Romano.

== Reception ==
When the film premiered on Canale 5 on 17 April 2000, the film was watched by over 11 million people. The second episode was watched by over 12 million people, or about 45.63% of all television viewers in Italy.

== See also ==
- Padre Pio: Between Heaven and Earth (2000)
- Padre Pio (2022)
