= Teatro di narrazione =

Teatro di narrazione (narrative theatre) is a style of theatre, developed in Italy in the later decades of the 20th century, in which there are no actors or action, but only a "narrattore" (a neologism for narrator-actor, or "narractor") who tells the story in narrative form.

== Overview ==
During the show, the narrattore often sits on a chair without moving. There are no props or costumes, nor any lights beyond those necessary to let the audience see the narratore: sometimes the theatre itself is lit so that the narrattore can see the faces of the audience to address them directly.

The genre generally said to have begun with Mistero Buffo (Comic Mystery) by Dario Fo in 1969, though Fo has traditionally used mime to physicalize the actions and the entire cast of characters when performing in this style. This influenced two generations of narrattori, notably Marco Paolini, Marco Baliani and Laura Curino; and later Ascanio Celestini, Davide Enia and Alessandro Ghebreigziabiher.

Although Mistero Buffo reworked medieval stories, the teatro di narrazione has a particular focus on investigating the "dark holes" of Italian modern history. Corpo di stato by Baliani concerns the murder of Aldo Moro by the Red Brigades in 1978; Curino's Olivetti concerns Camillo and Adriano Olivetti, founders of the Olivetti business empire; Paolini's Il racconto del Vajont the tragedy of the Vajont Dam disaster; Enia's Maggio '43 the Allied bombing of Palermo during the Allied invasion of Sicily in World War II; Celestini's Radio Clandestina and Scemo di guerra the Nazi-Fascist occupation of Rome and its subsequent American liberation; and Ghebreigziabiher's Tramonto and Il dono della diversità racism and immigration problems in the society.

== See also ==
- Documentary theatre
