= Little Sea (film) =

2009 drama film

- Directed by: Alessandro Di Robilant
- Screenplay by: Andrea Cotti; Leonardo Fasoli; Maddalena Ravagli
- Story by: Alessandro Genovesi; Francesco Pavolini; Stefano Vicario
- Starring: Giulio Beranek; Anna Ferruzzo; Michele Riondino
- Cinematography: Federico Masiero
- Edited by: Claudio Di Mauro
- Music by: Mokadelic
- Release date: 2009
- Language: Italian

Little Sea (Italian: Marpiccolo) is a 2009 Italian drama film directed by Alessandro Di Robilant.

== Plot ==
Tiziano is a boy who lives in the Paolo VI neighborhood of Taranto, a suburban area marked by urban decay, the polluting shadow of the ILVA steelworks, and the lack of legal services. To support his family, burdened by his father Franco's gambling debts, Tiziano works for Tonio, the local mafia boss, dealing drugs. In an attempt to finally resolve his financial problems, Tiziano and his friend Trascene rob the boss's safe, stealing approximately €200,000. However, Tiziano's father discovers the incident and, fearing retaliation, returns the entire backpack containing the cash to the criminal.

Upon discovery of the theft, the mafia boss Tonio forces Tiziano to repay the debt through a violent assignment: the murder of a local butcher. Tiziano wounds the man with gunshots but does not kill him; after a brief chase with the police, he is arrested and taken to a juvenile detention center.

Prison life immediately proves to be extremely harsh: Tiziano is subjected to nighttime attacks and an attempted drowning at sea by other inmates linked to his victim. Two key figures emerge in this context: educator De Nicola, who saves him from the attack in the water and encourages him not to waste his intelligence in fratricidal conflicts, and Professor Costa. The latter, provocatively, returns a book he had not finished, encouraging him to use his time in prison for study and reflection. Thanks to these stimuli and the support of his girlfriend Stella, Tiziano begins a journey of maturation.

Upon his release, Tiziano finds his father waiting for him. Franco takes him to a new, modern and luxurious home, initially omitting the source of his sudden wealth. However, during a party organized for his return, the boss Tonio shows up at the apartment and, in a private conversation with Tiziano, reveals the truth: his father has begun working for him, once again tying the family's fate to the local criminal world. Deeply disappointed, Tiziano categorically refuses to compromise: he declares he has paid his debts in prison and leaves his family home for good.

In the final sequences, Tiziano reunites with Stella to plan an escape to Bologna, where one of her aunts might host them. After a tense moment, which turns out to be nothing more than a nightmare for the protagonist (in which he is killed by his former friend on the boss's orders), Tiziano wakes up next to Stella. The two, determined to start over far from Taranto, prepare to set off on their motorcycles toward their new destination.

== Cast ==
- Giulio Beranek as Tiziano
- Anna Ferruzzo as Tiziano's Mother
- Selenia Orzella as Stella
- Michele Riondino as Tonio
- Nicola Rignanese as Franco
- Maria Pia Autorino as Luisa
- Giorgio Colangeli as Nicola
- Valentina Carnelutti as Professor Costa

== Production ==
The film is based on the novel Stupido by Andrea Cotti. was produced by Overlook Production and Rai Cinema. Principal photography started on 29 September 2008 in Taranto, Apulia. It had a budget of 1.3 million euros.

== Release ==
The film premiered at the 4th Rome Film Festival, in the Alice nella Città sidebar. It was released in Italian cinemas on 15 November 2009.

== Reception ==
Variety's critic Jay Weissberg wrote: "A wired performance by newcomer Giulio Beranek and a feel for locale keep Alessandro Di Robilant's Little Sea afloat when unconvincing plot elements threaten to drench the narrative".
