= Qualunquemente =

- Directed by: Giulio Manfredonia
- Screenplay by: Antonio Albanese; Piero Guerrera
- Produced by: Domenico Procacci
- Starring: Antonio Albanese
- Cinematography: Roberto Forza
- Music by: Banda Osiris
- Production company: Fandango
- Distributed by: 01 Distribution
- Release date: 21 January 2011
- Running time: 96 minutes
- Country: Italy
- Language: Italian
- Box office: € 15.869.000

Qualunquemente is a 2011 Italian satirical comedy film starring comedian Antonio Albanese as his famous character Cetto La Qualunque, a sleazy Southern Italy politician. The title means "whichever-ly" (adding ungrammatical adverbial endings is a shtick of the main character). It was released in Italy on 600 copies on 21 January 2011 and was screened in the Main Programme of the Panorama section at the 61st Berlin International Film Festival.

== Plot ==
Corrupt and sleazy entrepreneur Cetto La Qualunque comes back to Italy and "si butta in politica" meaning he "throws himself into politics" lest his law-abiding opponent, Giovanni De Santis, is elected as mayor.

Cetto La Qualunque is an entrepreneur from Calabria, a region in the South of Italy; he's very crude and vulgar, an embodiment of the Southern Italian society, also represented by corrupted politicians, administrators and auditors. While being a fugitive from the law in a Latin American country, Cetto met a beautiful girl, whom he calls "Cosa" (an Italian word meaning "you" or, rather, "thing" used to refer to people whose name is not remembered or irrelevant) comparing her to an object; he conceived a daughter with her whose name he doesn't even remember. When Cetto gets back to his hometown of Marina di Sopra ("Upper Sea Side"), in Calabria, his wife goes on a rampage after seeing his concubine alongside her husband. Cetto also has a son named Melo (short name for Carmelo but also meaning "Apple Tree") who lived with his mother while he was away, and who is awkward and shy.

After Cetto makes his triumphal comeback to his house, which looks like a typical 'ndrangheta mansion ('ndrangheta is the Calabrian mafia), he goes to his club in the nearby town, where he meets his friends who support him in every wickedness he commits. Cetto also owns a campsite, wrongly named "Paradais Village" a misspell of "Paradise Village", a very kitsch and shabby place. During the meeting, his friends also tell him about his hated neighbour De Santis's intention to run for Mayor of Marina di Sopra, to improve the economic and cultural plight of the people, since almost all of them are poor peasants. Hearing this news, Cetto decides to run for Mayor of the town as well. He does everything possible to be voted by the people of the town, but his ignorance and narrow-mindedness does not impress journalists and reporters, so Cetto is forced to call a manager, Gerry Salerno, from Bari but living most recently in Milan. Cetto just sees Pino as "The Stranger" (that's because Cetto is from Calabria while Pino is originally from Apulia, a different region) as a turncoat fellow since he left the South of Italy to go to the North, somehow betraying its cultural heritage. Cetto begins the campaign with Gerry, using tricks, cheating and deceit against the peasants inhabitants of Marina di Sopra.

Meanwhile, Cetto also tries to make his son a "made man" or a "wise guy", forcing him to leave his girlfriend because she is not curvy enough; the two of them go hunting illegally in protected areas, shoot at mannequins that resemble black men. At the end of this father to soon life trip Cetto forces Melo to have sex with his favourite prostitute so to prove its manhood. Stressed by the events related to the elections Cetto divorces his wife Carmen and quickly plans to marry his new girlfriend, Cosa from South America.

The story has a twist when Cavallaro of the Carabinieri a righteous military officer (who has been trying for years to imprison Cetto for all its illegalities and underworld activities) having no evidence, discovers that Cetto does not have a building permit for his pizzeria. Unfortunately when he goes to arrest him, Cetto has already changed the pizzeria's documents making his son the owner so to send him to prison instead. This way, Cetto has the opportunity to continue his electoral campaign. Meanwhile, his wife Carmen believes her husband to be a heartless monster and leaves him, while Cetto is preparing to hold its election speech in the square, and he promises procurement and abolition of taxes, but also guarantees the arrival of many prostitutes that he commonly nicknames "pilu" (female pubic hair, south Italian slang for "pussy"). Thanks to Gerry and the corruption of the reporter Calogero, Cetto knocks down the good intentions of De Santis and is elected mayor of Marina di Sopra. While Cetto is partying, Gerry leaves Italy and brings with him "Cosa" to give her a dignified life and to provide the little daughter a good education.

== Cast ==
- Antonio Albanese: Cetto La Qualunque
- Sergio Rubini: Gerardo "Gerry" Salerno
- Lorenza Indovina: Carmen La Qualunque
- Davide Giordano: Melo La Qualunque
- Nicola Rignanese Pino "O'straniero" (acquisito La Qualunque)
- Veronica Da Silva: Isabel Pilar Dos Santos, known as "Cosa"
- Salvatore Cantalupo: Giovanni De Santis
- Antonio Gerardi: Lieutenant Cavallaro
- Massimo De Lorenzo: Mr. Calogero
- Luigi Maria Burruano: Entrepreneur
- Manfredi Saavedra: Biondo

== Reception ==
Qualunquemente earned $7.4 million at the box office in its opening weekend. Critics have drawn comparisons between the main character and former Italian Prime Minister Silvio Berlusconi, particularly regarding his contemporary sex scandals.

== Cetto La Qualunque ==
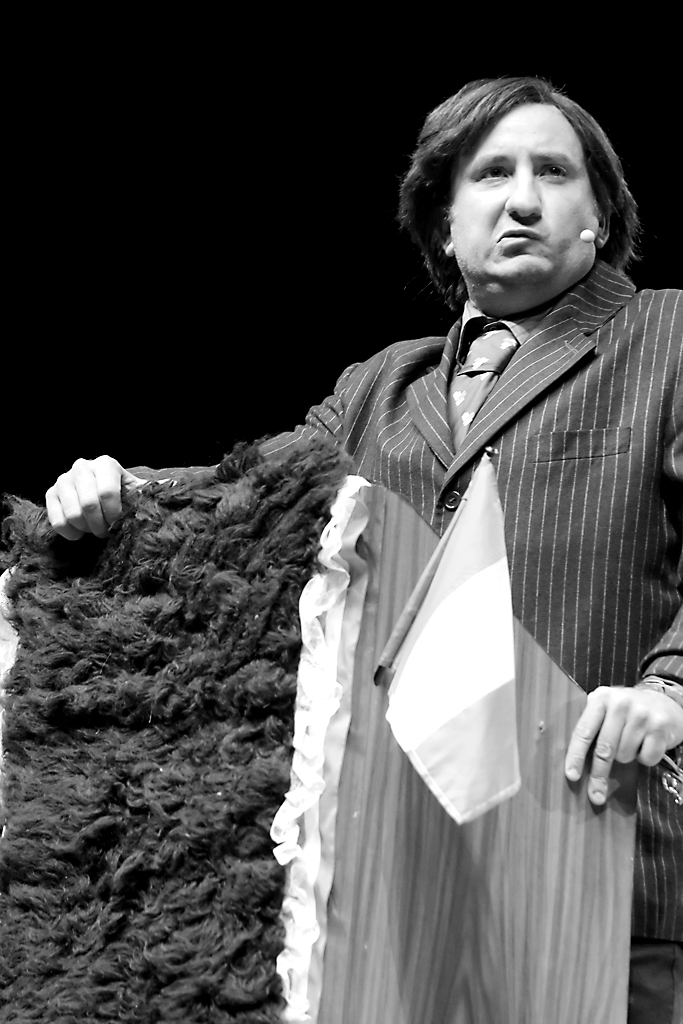
Antonio Albanese plays Cetto La Qualunque

Cetto La Qualunque is a character that shows perfectly the low culture of many politicians nowadays, even though he's a very marked caricature. Even the same last name "La Qualunque" (The Whatever) has a role in the creation of the character of the corrupt politician who thinks only to cultivate his interests in the small town of Marina di Sopra in Calabria. He has links with the Mafia and responds rudely to anyone in the country that tries to contradict him. Cetto is a cruel man, although not in a dictatorial way. He is also extremely racist, homophobic and ignorant towards the general culture and any human right. His only reference point is women who loves him and he uses them as simple household objects, demanding with strength that his wife Carmen gets used to his concubine (roughly called "Thing") that he has decided to stay at his residence together with the small family.

Cetto's son Melo will be sorely tried by these cruel treatment, especially when the father, in order not to end up in jail, sends his child instead, telling him that the prison is a training place for young people, almost better than a university.

What is most surprising in the film of Cetto's character is the fact that he wants to run for mayor of the small town to avoid ending up in jail. The other candidate, Giovanni De Santis, is a quiet man who observes the law with honesty. Cetto will be forced to destroy him in any possible way so that he can be elected mayor. He knows how to engage the gullible and ignorant people like him with his speeches in the town square. Cetto promises every time plenty of prostitutes on the streets and total cancellation of taxes, which is quite impossible in a normal country. When asked what he plans to do for the poor people, displaced persons and the handicapped, Cetto answers that will leave them all to rot in the sewers. In the film there is also a sequence in which Cetto begins to converse with his henchmen and replies amazed: "Crazy things!" when a colleague tells him that in that country the police came to arrest a man only because he fired with his gun to his neighbor, without wondering if this man was killed because he was a spy or a thug by half a point.

== Sequel ==
Tutto tutto niente niente is the 2012 sequel directed by Giulio Manfredonia, screenplay by Antonio Albanese and Piero Guerrera, produced by Domenico Procacci for Fandango and Leo with Rai Cinema and distributed by 01 Distribution. The cast, in addition to Antonio Albanese includes Paolo Villaggio, Nicola Rignanese, Fabrizio Bentivoglio, Lunetta Savino, Lorenza Indovina, Vito Teco Celio, Bob Messini, Luigi Maria Burruano, Davide Giordano, Maria Rosaria Russo and Alfonso Postiglione.

== Trilogy ==
Cetto c'è, senzadubbiamente (2019) is the last film. for the character of Cetto La Qualunque, the Calabrian political gangster aspires to become noble and monarch surrounded by a court of girls in bikinis.
