= Vesna Goes Fast =

- Directed by: Carlo Mazzacurati
- Written by: Umberto Contarello; Carlo Mazzacurati; Sandro Petraglia; Claudio Piersanti; Stefano Rulli
- Starring: Tereza Zajickova; Antonio Albanese
- Cinematography: Alessandro Pesci
- Music by: Jan Garbarek
- Release date: 1996
- Country: Italy
- Language: Italian

Vesna Goes Fast (Italian: Vesna va veloce) is a 1996 Italian drama film directed by Carlo Mazzacurati. It entered the competition at the 53rd Venice International Film Festival, in which Tereza Zajickova (now Tereza Groszmannová) won a Pasinetti Award for Best Actress. The film also won the Ciak d'Oro for Best Sound.

== Plot ==
Vesna is a Czech girl who arrives in Italy on a tourist bus. In Trieste, she decides to abandon her fellow countrymen and stay in Italy but she is soon forced to turn to prostitution to survive.

== Cast ==
- Tereza Zajickova: Vesna
- Antonio Albanese: Antonio
- Silvio Orlando: The insurer
- Ivano Marescotti: The client
- Antonio Catania: The owner of the diner
- Roberto Citran: The waiter
- Stefano Accorsi
- Andrea Karnasová
- Marco Messeri

== See also ==
- Movies about immigration to Italy
