= Two Friends (2002 film) =

- Theatrical release poster
- Directed by: Spiro Scimone; Francesco Sframeli
- Written by: Spiro Scimone
- Cinematography: Blasco Giurato
- Music by: Andrea Morricone
- Distributed by: Medusa Film
- Release date: 5 September 2002
- Running time: 86 minutes
- Country: Italy
- Language: Italian

Two Friends (Italian: Due amici) is a 2002 Italian drama film directed and starred by Spiro Scimone and Francesco Sframeli. It is based on the play Nunzio written by the same Scimone.

It was screened in the Critics Week section at the 59th Venice International Film Festival, in which the film won the Lion of the Future for best first feature. It was also nominated at the European Film Awards in the European Discovery section.

== Plot ==
Nunzio and Pino, two from Messina who emigrated to the North (the film was shot in Turin) are friends and live together in an apartment. Nunzio is a simple, religious and somewhat naive person towards life but with a big heart and is afflicted by a persistent cough caused by the dust that he sucks up every day in the factory. Pino is a closed and shy man, a killer linked in working terms to a silent and laconic Neapolitan fishmonger; he travels by train all the time, looking for the individuals he must kill. All this happens without the knowledge of his friend, unable to do any harm and fascinated by Pino's constant travel. One day Nunzio falls in love with Maria, a girl struggling with a broken radio. Pino tries in every way to help his friend to conquer her, but the company turns out to be useless, as Maria is already in love with Valerio, the neighborhood bartender. Nunzio is dejected, but Pino, fond of his friend more than anything else, decides to leave his "job", eliminates the fishmonger and, determined to change his life, leaves again by train, but this time in the company of the enthusiastic Nunzio.

== Cast ==
- Francesco Sframeli as Nunzio
- Spiro Scimone as Pino
- Teresa Saponangelo as Maria
- Valerio Binasco as Andrea
- Gianfelice Imparato as Malato
- Felice Andreasi as the landlord
- Nicola Rignanese as the doorman
- Roberto Citran as the radio-operator
- Armando Pugliese as the fishmonger
- Sara Bertelà as Angela
- Tano Cimarosa as the bar's customer
- Nicola Di Pinto as the bar's customer

== See also ==
- List of Italian films of 2002
