= Alessandro Ghebreigziabiher =

Italian writer, storyteller and stage actor

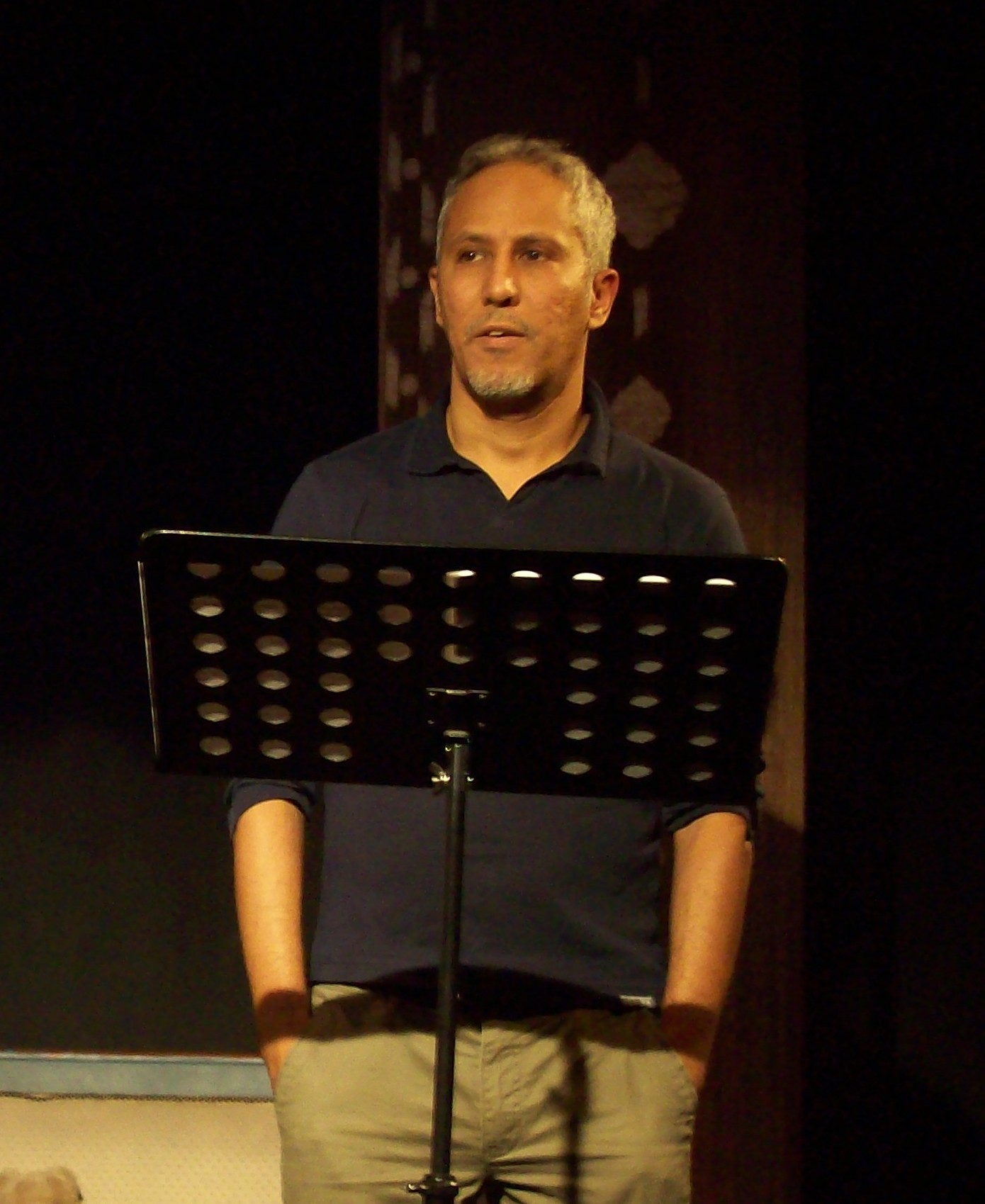
- Born: Alessandro Ghebreigziabiher; 1968 (age 57–58); Naples, Italy
- Education: La Sapienza University of Rome
- Occupations: novelist, short story writer, storyteller, stage actor
- Spouse: Cecilia Moreschi (m. 1999)

Alessandro Ghebreigziabiher (born May 20, 1968 in Naples, Italy) is an Italian writer and storyteller, author of works across multiple genres and of narrative projects based on true stories.

== Biography ==
Ghebreigziabiher was born in Naples to an Eritrean father and an Italian mother and currently lives in Rome. He obtained a Computer science University degree from La Sapienza University.

He is an author of novels and short stories spanning multiple genres, including mystery fiction, psychological fiction, contemporary narrative, essays and narrative on sports topics.

Alongside his literary work, he is active as a professional storyteller, developing narrative projects in oral and multimedia forms, and participating in festivals and public events.

His first book, Tramonto (Sunset), Lapis Edizioni, in 2003 was included by the International Youth Library inside The White Ravens, an annual list that includes 250 books from around the world considered especially noteworthy.

From 2007 to 2019, he was artistic director of the Italian storytelling festival Il dono della diversità ("The Gift of Diversity").

Barry Bradford, American speaker, historian and writer who contributed to reopen the Edgar Ray Killen case, appreciated his short story Il coraggio della speranza ("The courage of hope"), about James Chaney, Andrew Goodman, Michael Schwerner, and wrote the preface for his book Amori diversi ("Different Loves").

In 2016 he founded the international group Storytellers for Peace, composed of artists from around the world, with the aim of creating collective videos in several languages about peace and human rights.

An excerpt from his book Tramonto (Sunset) was published in English on Afropean.com, part of The Guardian newspaper's "Africa Network".

In addition to his writing, he is active in the production of narrative works based on true stories, which he distributes through digital platforms and multimedia formats. Since 2023, he has also produced a storytelling podcast featuring short narratives inspired by contemporary reality.

Parallel to his artistic activity, he has worked for over three decades as a theatre and storytelling teacher in educational and therapeutic contexts, particularly with adolescents.

== Personal life ==
He is married to Cecilia Moreschi, theatre actress and drama therapist. They have two sons and live in Rome, Italy. He is a supporter of Italian football team AS Roma.

== Bibliography ==
=== Novels ===
- Il poeta, il santo e il navigatore (2006, Fermento Editore) ISBN 88-89207-38-8
- L'intervallo (2008, Intermezzi Editore) ISBN 88-903576-1-4
- La truffa dei migranti (2015, Tempesta Editore) ISBN 978-88-97309-75-8
- Elisa e il meraviglioso mondo degli oggetti (2016, Tempesta Editore) ISBN 88-97309-87-9
- Carla senza di Noi (2017, Graphofeel Edizioni) ISBN 88-97381-79-0
- Lo strano vizio del professor Mann (2019, Ofelia Editrice) ISBN 88-99820-26-0
- Matematica delle parole (2019, Toutcourt Edizioni) ISBN 88-32219-09-3
- A morte i razzisti (2020, Oakmond Publishing) ISBN 39-62072-20-9
- Agata nel paese che non legge (2021, NEM Editore) ISBN 978-88-88903-63-7
- Io, Blu e Rosso (2023, Edizioni Bette) ISBN 979-12-80564-26-9
- Specchi delle nostre brame (2024, Edizioni Bette) ISBN 979-12-80564-35-1
- Ascolta, papà (2026, Bolis Edizioni) ISBN 978-88-7827-701-4

=== Illustrated children books ===
- Tramonto (2002, Edizioni Lapis) ISBN 88-87546-60-6
- Tra la terra e l'acqua (2008, Camelozampa Editore) ISBN 978-88-903034-2-5
- Roba da bambini (2014, Tempesta Editore) ISBN 978-88-97309-57-4
- Tramonto, la favola del figlio di Buio e Luce (2017, Tempesta Editore) ISBN 978-88-97309-94-9
- Il futuro dei miei (2026, Didattica Attiva) ISBN 979-12-81862-39-5

=== Collected short stories ===
- Mondo giovane (2006, Editrice La Ginestra) ISBN 88-8481-025-6
- Lo scrigno cosmopolita (2006, Editrice La Ginestra) ISBN 978-88-8481-031-1
- Il dono della diversità (2013, Tempesta Editore) ISBN 978-88-97309-34-5
- Amori diversi (2013, Tempesta Editore) ISBN 88-97309-45-3

=== Non-fiction ===
- Nato da un crimine contro l'umanità. Dialogo con mio padre sulle conseguenze del colonialismo italiano (2022, Tab Edizioni) ISBN 978-88-9295-611-7
- Cinquemila contro uno. L'impresa di Claudio Ranieri (2025, Tab Edizioni) ISBN 979-12-5669-240-8
- Between Two Souths: Growing Up Black in Italy (2026, Bayeux Arts) ISBN 978-17-7875-035-9

== Stage works ==
- Tramonto (1999)
- Robin Dream (2005)
- La vera storia di Jean-Baptiste du Val-de-Grâce, oratore della razza umana (2008)
- Loving vs Virginia (2010)
- Storie e Notizie (2010)
- Nostro figlio è nato (2012)
- Il dono della diversità (2013)
- Roba da bambini (2014)
- Questa è la paura (2015)
- La truffa dei migranti (2015)
- Quando (2016)
- Curami (2017)
- Le sette vite di Eva (2018)
- Storie da pazzi di storie (2019)

== Sources ==
- Diversi libri diversi: scaffali multiculturali e promozione della lettura, Vinicio Ongini, Idest Editore, 2003 – ISBN 88-87078-28-9
- Nuovo planetario italiano, Armando Gnisci, Città aperta Edizioni, 2006 – ISBN 88-8137-260-6
- L' immagine della società nella fiaba, Franco Cambi, Sandra Landi, Gaetana Rossi, Armando Editore, 2008 – ISBN 88-6081-332-8
- Scrivere nella lingua dell'altro: la letteratura degli immigrati in Italia, Daniele Comberiati, Peter Lang Editore, 2010 – ISBN 90-5201-597-X
- L'immigrazione raccontata ai ragazzi, Luatti Lorenzo, Nuove Esperienze Editrice, 2011 – ISBN 978-88-95533-17-9
- E noi? Il posto degli scrittori migranti nella narrativa per ragazzi, Lorenzo Luatti, introduzione di Armando Gnisci, Sinnos Editrice, 2010 - ISBN 88-7609-176-9
- African Theatre 8: Diasporas, Interculture on Stage: Afro-Italian Theatre Capitolo Interculture on Stage: Afro-Italian Theatre, Sabrina Brancato (pp. 52–64) Boydell & Brewer, James Currey, 2009 - ISBN 978-18-47015-01-3
- Il territorio dalla stiva. I care Child development & disabilities, Angelo Cupini, Franco Angeli editrice, 2010 - ISSN 2036-5888
- Fingertips stained with ink: Notes on new 'migrant writing'in Italy, Volume 8 Interventions, International Journal of Postcolonial Studies, Alessandro Portelli, 2006 - ISSN 1369-801X
- Re-writing history in the literature of the Ethiopian diaspora in Italy, Volume 13 African Identities, Sara Marzagora, 2015 - ISSN 1472-5843
- Studi storici sul colonialismo italiano: Bibliografia (2000-2024), Nicola Labanca, Franco Angeli editrice, 2024 - ISBN 978-88-35163-57-2
- In forma di teatro. Lingua, cultura e formazione per una cittadinanza attiva, Florinda Nardi, Culture Teatrali n. 33, annale 2024 - ISBN 979-12-5609-093-8
- Origine e sviluppo della letteratura afroitaliana, Igiaba Scego, Estratto, anno CCVI, terza serie, 18/I - Rivista Ateneo Veneto, 2019 - ISSN 1722-3555
- La Ricerca, L'altro, Lisa Sacerdote e Luisa Zecca, Rivista di Studi e Ricerche sulla criminalità organizzata, Vol. 11 n. 1, 2025 - ISSN 2421-5635

== See also ==
Teatro di narrazione
