= Neri Marcorè =

Italian actor

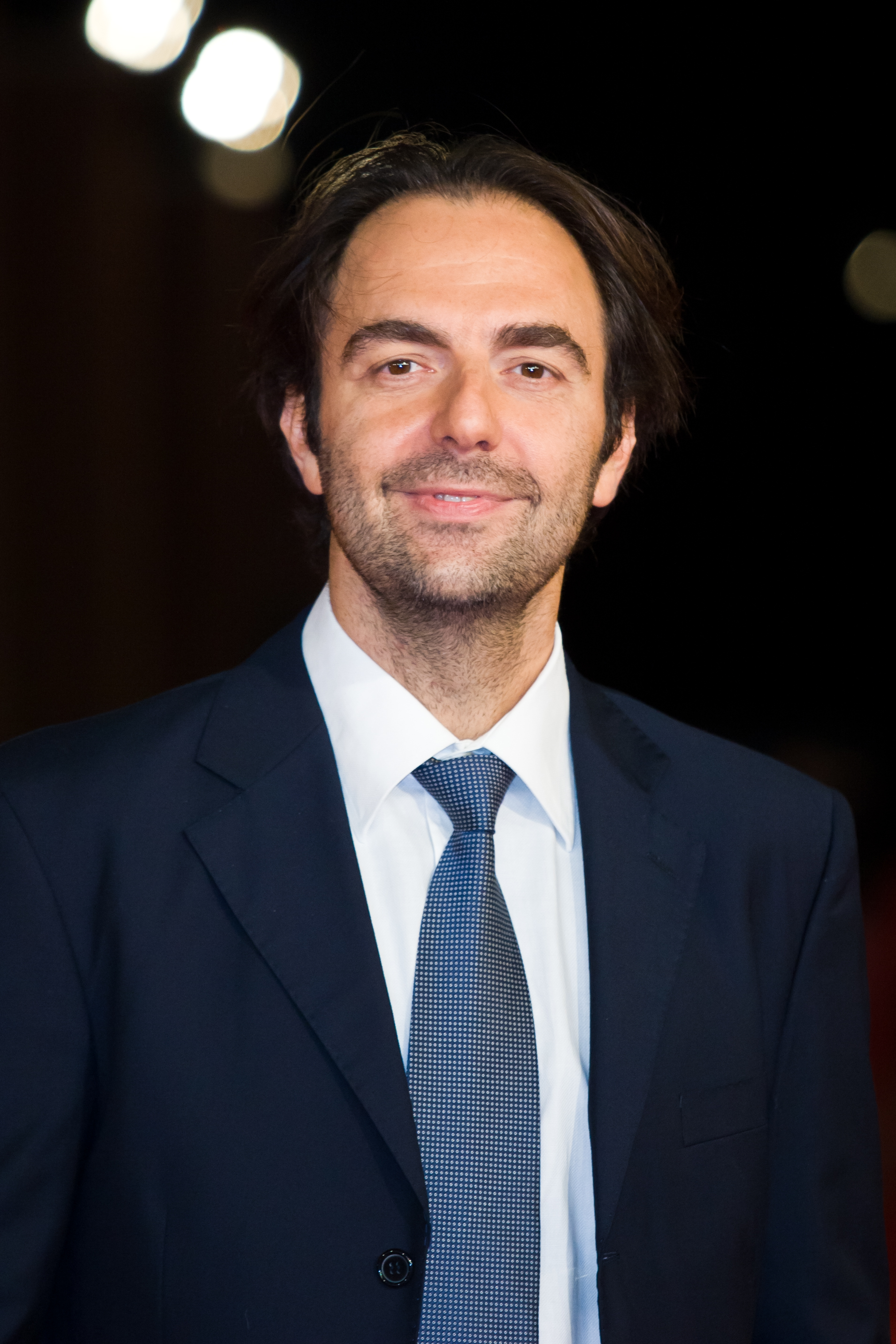
- Marcorè at the Rome Film Festival in 2010
- Born: Porto Sant'Elpidio, Italy
- Occupations: Actor; voice actor; impressionist; television presenter; singer
- Years active: 1994–present

Neri Marcorè is an Italian actor, voice actor, impressionist, television presenter and singer. He has appeared in 22 films and television shows since 1994. He starred in the film Incantato, which was entered into the 2003 Cannes Film Festival.

He is an atheist.

== Selected filmography ==
- Viol@ (1998)
- Bimba - È clonata una stella (2002)
- Incantato (2003)
- The Second Wedding Night (2005)
- Viva Zapatero!, regia di Sabina Guzzanti (2005)
- Pope John Paul I: The Smile of God – TV film (2006)
- Lessons in Chocolate (2007)
- Tutti pazzi per amore – TV series (2008-2012)
- I mostri oggi (2009)
- The Friends at the Margherita Cafe (2009)
- The Tourist (2010)
- Tous les soleils (2011)
- Fuoriclasse – TV series (2011-2015)
- Asterix and Obelix: God Save Britannia (2012)
- I Can Quit Whenever I Want (2014)
- Ever Been to the Moon? (2015)
- A Holy Venetian Family (2015)
- Latin Lover (2015)
- I Can Quit Whenever I Want: Ad Honorem (2017)
- Medici – TV series, 2 episodes (2019)
- My Paper Dolls (2023)
- The Worst Days (2023)

== Voice work ==
=== Animation ===
- Various characters in the Italian dub of The Simpsons, Looney Tunes and Merrie Melodies, The Powerpuff Girls
- Mr. Mackey and Big Gay Al in South Park (1st Italian dub)
- Yellow pencil, actor and rich kids' father in How the Toys Saved Christmas
- The Grey-Pink Man (Agent 4587) in Momo
- Petrucchio in Kate - The Taming of the Shrew
- Leo in Leo the Lion
- General Lanza in Il Generale e i Fratellini d'Italia
- Husk in Hazbin Hotel (Italian dub)

=== Live-action ===
- Narrator in Silvio Forever, Figli del destino
- Renato in Mollami
