= Law of Courage =

1994 film

- Film poster
- Directed by: Alessandro Di Robilant
- Written by: Alessandro Di Robilant
- Produced by: Maurizio Tedesco
- Starring: Giulio Scarpati; Sabrina Ferilli; Renato Carpentieri; Leopoldo Trieste; Regina Bianchi
- Cinematography: David Scott
- Edited by: Cecilia Zanuso
- Music by: Franco Piersanti
- Distributed by: Warner Bros. Italia
- Release date: February 1994
- Running time: 92 minutes
- Country: Italy
- Language: Italian

Law of Courage (Italian: Il giudice ragazzino, literally "the kid judge") is a 1994 Italian biographical drama film directed by Alessandro Di Robilant. It was entered into the 44th Berlin International Film Festival where it won the Blue Angel Award. For this film Giulio Scarpati was awarded with a David di Donatello for Best Actor.

== Cast ==
- Giulio Scarpati as Rosario Livatino
- Sabrina Ferilli as Angela Guarnera
- Leopoldo Trieste as Mr. Livatino
- Regina Bianchi as Mrs. Livatino (as Régina Bianchi)
- Paolo De Vita as Maresciallo
- Francesco Bellomi as Vincenzo Calò
- Virginia Bellomo as Moglie di Saetta
- Giovanni Boncoddo as Giudice Cali'
- Gabriella Bove as Moglie del Maresciallo
- Antonino Bruschetta as Di Salvo
- Renato Carpentieri as Migliore
