= A World Apart =

A World Apart may refer to:

- A World Apart (TV series), a 1970–1971 daytime drama series on ABC
- A World Apart (1988 film), an anti-apartheid drama
- A World Apart (2024 film), an Italian film
- A World Apart (book), 1950, on the Gulag by Gustaw Herling
- Endzone: A World Apart, a video game
