= Mafia and Red Tomatoes =

- Directed by: Giulio Manfredonia
- Written by: Giulio Manfredonia; Fabio Bonifacci
- Produced by: Lionello Cerri
- Starring: Stefano Accorsi; Sergio Rubini
- Cinematography: Marcello Montarsi
- Music by: Mauro Pagani
- Release date: September 18, 2014
- Running time: 100 minutes
- Language: Italian

Mafia and Red Tomatoes (Italian: La nostra terra) is a 2014 Italian comedy film written and directed by Giulio Manfredonia and starring Stefano Accorsi, and Sergio Rubini.

== Cast ==
- Stefano Accorsi as Filippo
- Sergio Rubini as Cosimo
- Iaia Forte as Azzurra
- Bebo Storti as Dario
- Debora Caprioglio as Jessica
- Maria Rosaria Russo as Rossana
- Nicola Rignanese as Valerio
- Massimo Cagnina as Piero
- Giovanni Calcagno as Piero
- Giovanni Esposito as Frullo
- Silvio Laviano as Salvo
- Michel Leroy as Wuambua
- Paolo De Vita as The Maresciallo
- Tommaso Ragno as Nicola Sansone

== See also ==
- List of Italian films of 2014
