= Tutto tutto niente niente =

- Directed by: Giulio Manfredonia
- Written by: Antonio Albanese; Piero Guerrera
- Produced by: Domenico Procacci
- Starring: Antonio Albanese; Fabrizio Bentivoglio; Paolo Villaggio
- Music by: Paolo Buonvino
- Production company: Fandango
- Distributed by: 01 Distribution
- Release date: 13 December 2012
- Running time: 90 min
- Country: Italy
- Language: Italian

Tutto tutto niente niente is a 2012 Italian film starring comedian Antonio Albanese as his character Cetto La Qualunque, a sleazy southern Italian politician. Albanese also plays two other major characters: Rodolfo Favaretto, a racist, secessionist native of Veneto, and Frengo Stoppato, an addict from a Catholic family. Despite detention, all three become members of Parliament due to parliamentary immunity. It is the sequel of Qualunquemente.

== Plot ==
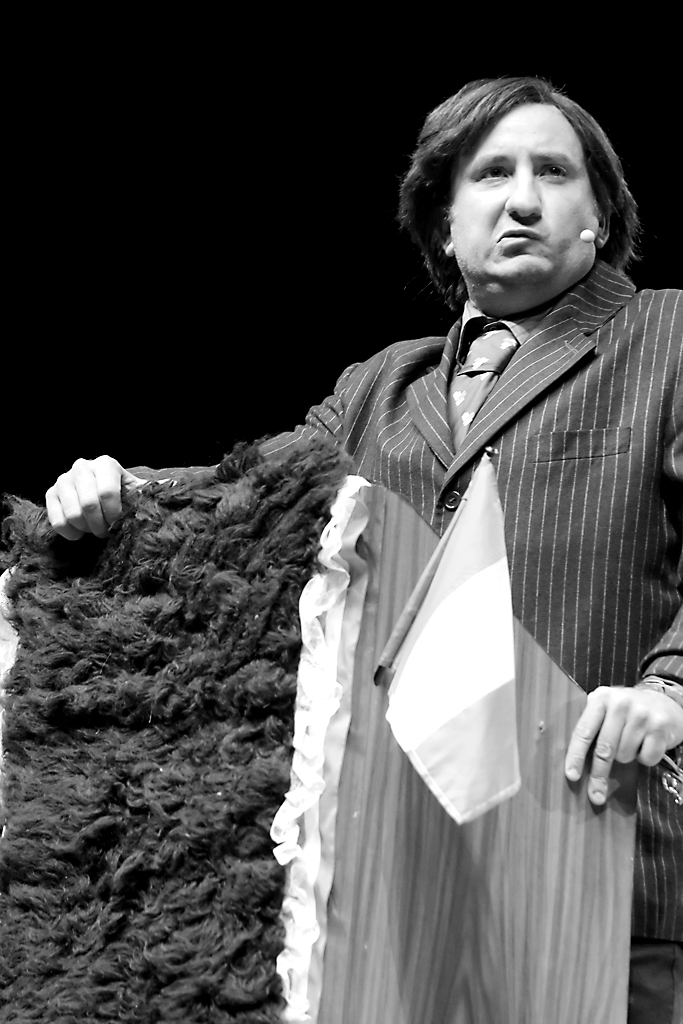
Albanese as Cetto La Qualunque

Cetto La Qualunque (Albanese) has just become mayor of Marina di Sopra (a small village in Calabria). The corrupt, ignorant, fugitive entrepreneur wants to lead by doing nothing and relying on the support of his friends. Lieutenant Cavallaro soon tricks him and sends him to prison with his gang, including Pino ("The Stranger"; to Calabrians, Apulians look like non-EU citizens). In Veneto (in northern Italy), manufacturer Rodolfo "Olfo" Favaretto (Albanese) dreams for years of unifying the Italian regions of Piedmont, Lombardia, Friuli-Venezia Giulia and Veneto with a highway to Austria. Olfo (a secessionist) wants to return Italy to the eighteenth century, when the Austro-Hungarian Empire was dominated by the north. He escorts a group of criminals from his bunker in Venice on a speedboat ride, making them look like tourists so they are not stopped by the police. When Olfo arrives at his shipyard, he orders illegal immigrants to get to work on his highway. A man falls from the roof and is apparently dead. To avoid trouble, Olfo tries to put the body in a bag and throw it in the channel; the man is not dead, however, and goes to the police. Frengo Stoppato (Albanese) is a drug addict who lives happily in Brazil until a call, apparently from his mother, brings him back to Italy. It is a trick; the woman, telling him to convert to Catholicism before she dies, has him arrested for drug possession.

In Rome's Palazzo Montecitorio, corrupt politicians decide (with the consent of the secretary of Prime Minister (Fabrizio Bentivoglio) to replace three recently-killed MPs with Cetto, Olfo and Frengo; among them is the prime minister (Paolo Villaggio). Cetto, Olfo and Frengo are treated like royalty, with mansions and luxury apartments, and do nothing all day. The secretary ordered them only to swear allegiance and never betray him. Their ineptitude, character and habits create trouble for the government. Cetto does not vote even once in the Chamber of Deputies and has sex with beautiful women until he unwittingly has an encounter with a transsexual. Frengo, desiring beatification, asks for an audience with Pope Benedict XVI. He believes that the Holy Family is imperfect; God impregnated Mary, and Saint Joseph recognized Jesus as his son. Olfo becomes increasingly racist.

== Cast ==
- Antonio Albanese: Cetto La Qualunque/Olfo Favaretto/Frengo Stoppato
- Fabrizio Bentivoglio: Secretary to the Prime Minister of Italy
- Paolo Villaggio: Prime Minister of Italy
- Luigi Maria Burruano: Entrepreneur friend of Cetto
- Lorenza Indovina: Carmen La Qualunque
- Nicola Rignanese Pino ("The Stranger")
- Vito: Olfo's mute advisor

== Sequel ==
Cetto c'è, senzadubbiamente (2019), the sequel, is the trilogy's last film.
