= Italian Night =

- Directed by: Carlo Mazzacurati
- Written by: Franco Bernini; Carlo Mazzacurati
- Starring: Giulia Boschi
- Cinematography: Agostino Castiglioni
- Music by: Fiorenzo Carpi
- Release date: 1987
- Language: Italian

Italian Night (Italian: Notte italiana) is a 1987 Italian comedy drama film co-written and directed by Carlo Mazzacurati. It won several awards including the Grand Prix at the Annecy Film Festival, the Nastro d'Argento for Best New Director and the Globo d'oro for Best Actor (to Marco Messeri).

== Cast ==
- Marco Messeri as Otello
- Giulia Boschi as Daria
- Mario Adorf as Tornova
- Roberto Citran as Gàbor
- Memè Perlini as Francesco aka 'Checco'
- Remo Remotti as Italo
- Tino Carraro as Melandri
- Silvana De Santis as Mistress of the Inn
- Antonio Petrocelli as Paschero
