= Cetto c'è, senzadubbiamente =

2019 film by Giulio Manfredonia

- Directed by: Giulio Manfredonia
- Written by: Antonio Albanese; Piero Guerrera
- Produced by: Mario Gianani; Lorenzo Mieli
- Starring: Antonio Albanese
- Music by: Emanuele Bossi
- Production company: Fandango
- Distributed by: 01 Distribution
- Release date: 8 October 2019
- Running time: 93 minutes
- Country: Italy
- Language: Italian
- Box office: €4.9 million

Cetto c'è, senzadubbiamente is a 2019 Italian satirical comedy film starring Antonio Albanese as his character Cetto La Qualunque. It is the third film of a trilogy which came after the movies Qualunquemente and Tutto tutto niente niente.

== Plot ==
Cetto La Qualunque, after his experiences in politics, has rebuilt a life in Germany, where he has lived for four years with the beautiful Petra, his new wife, their daughter and his loyal friend Pino.

One evening, returning from a dinner with his in-laws, he receives a phone call informing him that his elderly aunt is on her deathbed: upon returning to his birth town Cetto is informed by the latter of his true origins, as the woman reveals to him that his father was not a door-to-door agent of detergents as they had always told him but the prince Buffo di Calabria and that therefore he too is of royal blood.

Cetto, who in vain seeks confirmation of these noble births from his ex-wife Carmen, who became a nun, and he remains shocked by the changes brought by his and his ex-wife's son, Melo, in the municipality of Marina di Sopra, of which Melo became mayor. He is then approached by Count Venanzio, who pushes him to accept his nobility and to aspire to recreate the Bourbon Two Sicilies, who Cetto also starts to like as idea but wants to rename it as the Two Calabrias, since, as he said, one Sicily is enough. Democracy has now failed in Italy and Cetto is the right man to return to the monarchy.

Cetto and his old friends, however, have a lot of difficulties in adapting to the new context in which they have to live and besides they must deny Ferdinando Buffo di Calabria, nephew of Cetto's father, claims and accusations, who pushes him to have a DNA test to confirm who is his father, to show if he's actually blood related to the noble. Cetto is also forced to leave Petra to marry, according to Venanzio's instructions, the Infanta of Portugal, in order to make his reign more solid. Petra, however, while leaving, promise revenge.

Having also obtained the support of the Church in the person of a powerful cardinal, the wedding between Cetto and the Infanta is celebrated, even if Cetto didn't even bother to know her because of her ugliness, preferring by far the frequentation of many escorts such as his usual, and everything seems ready to start the referendum to ask Italians for the maintenance of the republic or the reinstating of the monarchy. The electoral campaign is organized by Melo, after he was forced to abandon the career as mayor, after he is investigated again as a figurehead for his father, this time in Germany.

Just when Cetto's victory is celebrated, the latter discovers that it is actually a plan of Venanzio, who feigned and who also sabotaged the DNA results to make him believe he was a noble, to obtain power and so, a few hours before his coronation, Cetto and Pino reveal to him that they have discovered his plots and they threaten him to make sure he never to tries to rip them off again. The coronation is celebrated and Cetto thus obtains power and becomes king, but soon after Petra wounds him with a pistol.

However, Cetto is saved and, after recovering, decides to continue to pursue his monarchical delusions, in which he now believes too.

== Cast ==
- Antonio Albanese as Cetto La Qualunque
- Nicola Rignanese as Pino
- Gianfelice Imparato as Count Venanzio
- Caterina Shulha as Petra
- Davide Giordano as Melo La Qualunque
- Massimo Cagnina as the sourveyor
- Mario Cordova as the false invalid
- Mario Patanè as Cetto's friend
- Manfredi Saavedra as Biondo
- Manuela Ventura as Claire de Fusigni
- Aurora Quattrocchi as aunt Annunziata
- Luigi Petrucci as the high prelate
- Cesare Capitani as Ferdinando Buffo di Calabria
- Guido Roncalli as the accountant
- Alfredo Pea as the religious man
- Mauro Marino as the Marquis of Cascais
- Diego Verdegiglio as the secretary
- Marit Nissen as Petra's mother's father
- Ralph Palka as Petra
- Lorenza Indovina as Carmen La Qualunque
- Guè as himself

== Release ==
The film was released on 8 October 2019.

== Reception ==
The movie grossed €4.9 million in Italy.

Giovanni De Stefano, of Rolling Stone Italia, wrote in a review that, while the premises were good, even if not on the same level as the first movie, the movie overall wasn't very funny and it was quite boring but also adding that it wasn't this the biggest problem of the movie but that it was that according to him the movie "made laugh the wrongful type of people" and, comparing it to Alec Baldwin interpretation of Donald Trump, "it wasn't as funny as the politics from which it took inspiration" and finally saying he hoped that there would be a fourth movie in the series to better serve as an epilogue.

Luca Ceccotti wrote that the movie wasn't from a technical point of view very good but also said that the movie represented the best use until this point of the character Cetto La Qualunque and that it was the best movie in the trilogy, praising its paraphrasing and parody of citations of Karl Marx, Friedrich Engels and Julius Caesar, the popular way of speaking he uses and the idea of the people being so discontent with current politics to prefer a return to monarchical rule to a democratic republic.

Martina Barone was quite critical of the movie, saying that it was poorly executed, especially the story, and that the movie wasn't able to use the concepts like sovereigntism or of monarchical rule in Italy.
