= Marco Baliani =

Italian actor, playwright, and theatre director

- Born: 6 July 1950 (age 75); Verbania, Italy
- Occupation: Actor
- Years active: 1975–present

Marco Baliani (born 6 July 1950) is an Italian actor, playwright and theatre director. He is best known for his Teatro di narrazione work Kohlhaas which is based on Heinrich von Kleist's Michael Kohlhaas

== Selected filmography ==
Film
Year	Title	Role	Notes
2002	The Best Day of My Life		
2001	Tomorrow		
1998	Rehearsals for War		
