= An Italian Romance =

2004 film

- Directed by: Carlo Mazzacurati
- Starring: Stefano Accorsi; Maya Sansa
- Cinematography: Luca Bigazzi
- Music by: Franco Piersanti
- Release date: 2004
- Language: Italian

An Italian Romance (Italian: L'amore ritrovato, also known as A Rekindled Affair) is a 2004 Italian romantic drama film directed by Carlo Mazzacurati. It premiered out of competition at the 61st Venice International Film Festival and was later screened at the Toronto International Film Festival. It's the story of Maria who is having a toxic relationship with Giovanni, a married man and father of a son.

== Cast ==
- Stefano Accorsi: Giovanni
- Maya Sansa: Maria
- Marco Messeri: Franchino
- Anne Canovas: Ines
- Roberto Citran: Alvaro
- Luisanna Pandolfi: Armida
- Alba Rohrwacher: Collega di Maria

== See also ==
- List of Italian films of 2004
