= School Is Over =

2010 film

- Directed by: Valerio Jalongo
- Cinematography: Stefano Falivene
- Music by: Francesco Sarcina
- Release dates: October 2010 (Rome Film Festival); 12 November 2010 (Italy)
- Running time: 83 minutes
- Language: Italian

School Is Over (Italian: La scuola è finita) is a 2010 Italian drama film directed by Valerio Jalongo. It was screened in competition at the 2010 Rome Film Festival and nominated for a Golden Marc'Aurelio Award. It was also nominated for the Silver Ribbon Award for Best Score by the Italian National Syndicate of Film Journalists in 2011.

== Cast ==
- Valeria Golino as Daria Quarenghi
- Vincenzo Amato as Aldo Talarico
- Fulvio Forti as Alex Donadei
- Antonella Ponziani as Serena Donadei
- Marcello Mazzarella as Michele
