= Freshwater Man =

1997 comedy film

- Directed by: Antonio Albanese
- Screenplay by: Antonio Albanese; Vincenzo Cerami
- Produced by: Vittorio Cecchi Gori; Rita Rusić
- Starring: Antonio Albanese; Valeria Milillo
- Cinematography: Massimo Pau
- Edited by: Cecilia Zanuso
- Music by: Nicola Piovani
- Release date: 1995
- Language: Italian

Freshwater Man (Italian: Uomo d'acqua dolce) is a 1997 Italian comedy film written and directed by Antonio Albanese, at his directorial debut.

== Cast ==
- Antonio Albanese as Antonio
- Valeria Milillo as Beatrice
- Antonio Petrocelli as Goffredo
- Sara Anticoli as Tonina
- Emanuela Grimalda as Patrizia
- Stefano Sarcinelli as Patrizio
- Birte Berg as Patrizio’s wife

== Production ==
The film was shot in Milan and on the arm of Lake Como near Lecco in the fall of 1996.

== Release ==
The film was released in Italian cinemas on 14 February 1997.

== Reception ==
Variety's critic David Rooney described the film as a "a fragile but nonetheless exhilarating vehicle for his [Albanese's] considerable talents", highlighting "a nod to the tradition of the silent film comedians and, more explicitly, to Jacques Tati". Maurizio Porro from Corriere della Sera similarly noted Albanese "embodies all the poetics of silent cinema", and called the film "charming, intelligent, and also witty".

For this film Antonio Albanese was nominated for the Nastro d'Argento for Best New Director.
