= Lorenza Indovina =

Italian actress (born 1966)

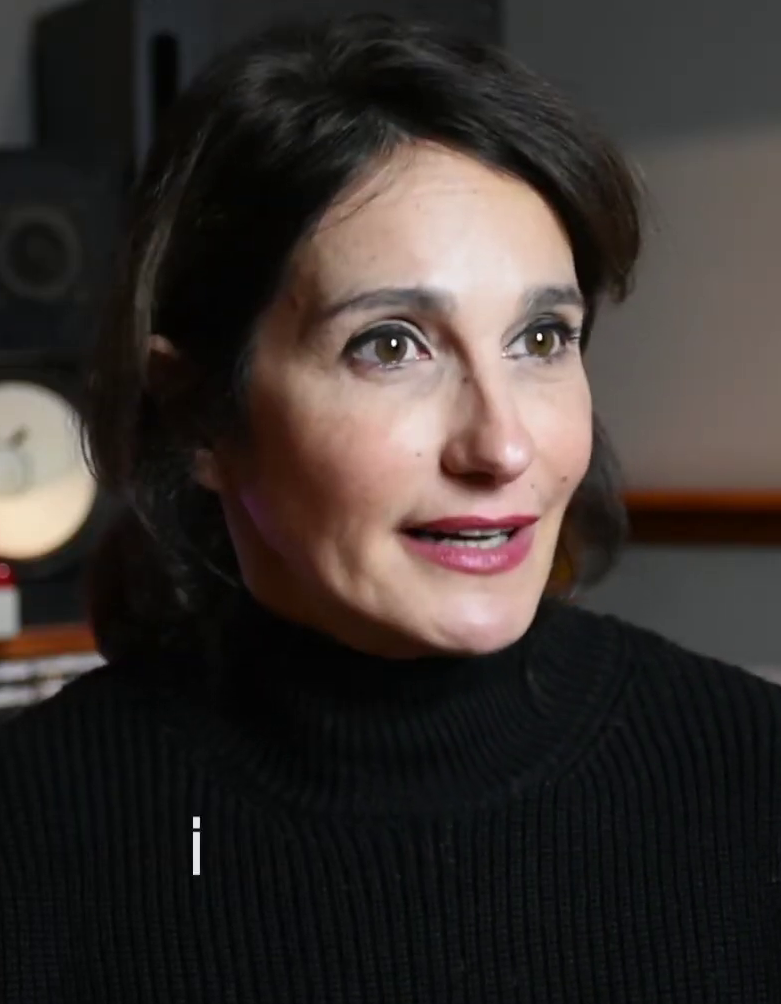
- Indovina in 2020
- Born: 5 October 1966 (age 59); Rome, Italy
- Occupation: Actress
- Spouse: Niccolò Ammaniti (m. 2005)
- Father: Franco Indovina

Lorenza Indovina (born 5 October 1966) is an Italian actress.

== Life and career ==
Born in Rome, the daughter of the director Franco Indovina, she studied acting at the Silvio D'Amico National Academy of Dramatic Arts, graduating in 1991. She made her professional debut on stage in 1992, in the drama Il trittico di Antonello by Francesco Crescimone. She was nominated for David di Donatello twice, in 1997 for Francesco Rosi's The Truce and in 2000 for Gianluca Maria Tavarelli's A Love. She is married to writer Niccolò Ammaniti since 2005.

== Selected filmography ==
- The Rebel (1993)
- The Escort (1993)
- The Truce (1997)
- A Love (1999)
- Padre Pio: Miracle Man (2000)
- Almost Blue (2000)
- Life as It Comes (2003)
- Inferno Below (2003)
- Sorry, You Can't Get Through! (2005)
- The Past Is a Foreign Land (2008)
- Qualunquemente (2011)
- Tutto tutto niente niente (2012)
- Me Romantic Romani (2014)
- Land of Saints (2015)
- Partly Cloudy with Sunny Spells (2015)
- Burning Love (2015)
- Forever Young (2016)
- Cetto c'è, senzadubbiamente (2019)
- Everything's Gonna Be Alright (2020)
- Luna Park (2021)
