= Carlo Carlei =

Italian film director

Carlo Carlei (born 16 April 1960 in Nicastro) is an Italian film director. He has directed the English-language films Fluke (1995) and Romeo & Juliet (2013), as well as the Italian television film Padre Pio: Miracle Man (2000).

== Biography ==
Carlo Carlei was born in Nicastro, Lamezia Terme on 16 April 1960. Carlei had a strong interest in filmmaking since childhood. In an interview with Los Angeles Times, Carlei cited the Stanley Kubrick film 2001: A Space Odyssey as an influential film. Although he initially moved to Rome to study law, he instead attended the newly-established Gaumont Film School in 1981, established by producer Renzo Rossellini. There, he directed his thesis film, Flight of the Innocent, which was later featured in the 1985 science-fiction anthology film Juke Box (Italian: Juke Box) alongside films by Daniele Luchetti, Valerio Jalongo and Antonello Grimaldi. In 1991, Carlei directed the 50-minute television film Captain Cosmos, which featured the final appearance of actor Walter Chiari.

In 1992, Carlei directed Flight of the Innocent. Although the film received negative reviews in Italy, the film was better received internationally, especially at its premiere at the Cannes Film Festival. Bill Mechanic, then-president of Walt Disney Studios's International Distribution, helped redistribute the film in Italy, while Metro-Goldwyn-Mayer distributed the film in the United States. The film was nominated at 51st Golden Globe Awards, for the "Best Foreign Language Film", but lost to the Chinese-Hong Kong film, Farewell My Concubine. Carlei was also nominated at the 38th David di Donatello for "Best New Director", but lost to Mario Martone.
