= Antonio Albanese =

Italian comedian, actor, director and writer

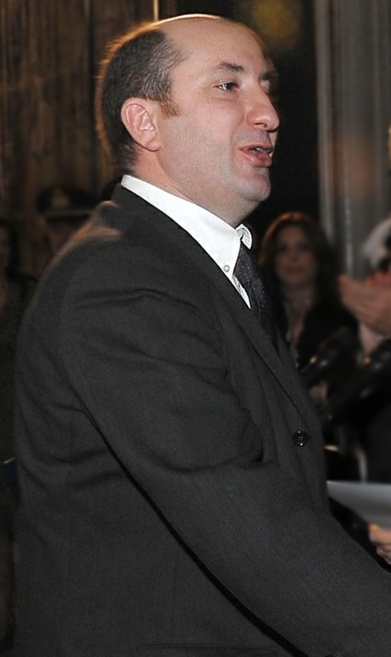
- Born: 10 October 1964 (age 62); Olginate, Province of Lecco, Italy
- Occupations: Actor, screenwriter, director
- Years active: 1990–present

Antonio Albanese (born 10 October 1964 in Olginate, Province of Lecco), is an Italian comedian, actor, director and writer.

== Biography ==
Born in Lombardy to Sicilian parents, he studied at the Civic Drama School in Milan, then opted to pursue an acting career. His first experiences as a comedian date back to 1992, when he made his debut at the Zelig Theatre in Milan. He showcased his acts on the popular Maurizio Costanzo talk show and collaborated with actor-comedian Paolo Rossi. His popularity increased after he joined the Italia 1 show Mai dire Gol. He recently appears on the show Che tempo che fa, presented by Fabio Fazio and aired on Rai 3.

From the late 1990s, Albanese also pursued a movie career, working both as an actor, under the direction of Carlo Mazzacurati and Pupi Avati, and also as a director in his own right.

In 2025 he won the Stresa Prize with his first novel La strada giovane.

== Characters ==
- Cetto La Qualunque: A corrupt, perverted Calabrian with organized crime connections, right-wing Senator, running as candidate with a platform based mainly on "abundance of attractive women" (cchiù pilu pi tutti, which is also the title of a book released by Albanese using the character's name). The character was featured first on Albanese's own TV show Non c'è problema (There's no problem), aired on Rai Tre in 2003, but achieved more success when proposed at Mai dire domenica on Italia 1. It is currently staged by Albanese on a weekly basis on the program Che tempo che fa aired on Rai 3. In 2011 was released Qualunquemente, a feature length movie about him, and in 2012, the sequel movie, Tutto tutto niente niente followed in 2019 by another sequel Cetto c'è, senzadubbiamente.
- Mino Martinelli: An arrogant coke-sniffing philosopher.
- Alex Drastico: An aggressive Sicilian male, known especially for his comical "curses".
- Frengo: A bizarre Apulian football commentator, and fan of Foggia and Zdenek Zeman, characterized by his strange dance-like steps.
- Ivo Perego: A small-time Lombard entrepreneur.
- The Minister of Fear: A recent disturbing character, portrayed first on stage in a live show called "Psicoparty" (Psychoparty) and then again on television on 4 October 2008 in the program Che tempo che fa. The Minister is always accompanied by the Under-Secretary for Anxiety and consumes quantities of narcotics and mind-altering drugs.

== Filmography ==
=== Actor ===
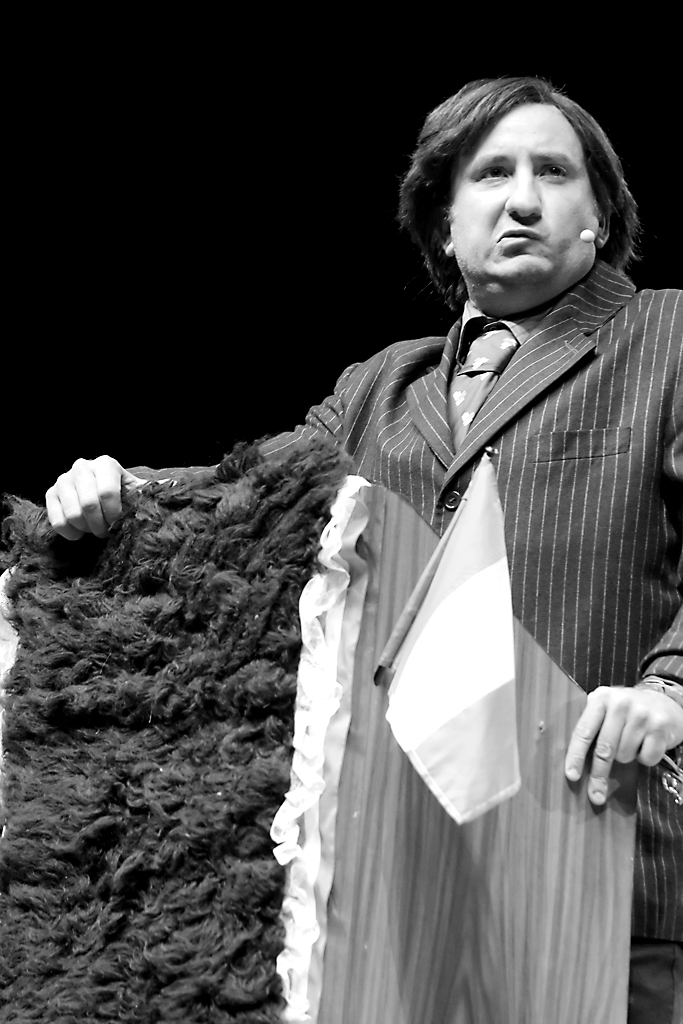
Albanese as Cetto La Qualunque

- A Soul Split in Two (1993)
- Vesna Goes Fast (1996)
- Freshwater Man (1997)
- You Laugh (1998)
- La fame e la sete (1999)
- Holy Tongue (2000)
- Il nostro matrimonio è in crisi (2002)
- L'uomo flessibile (2003)
- È già ieri (2004)
- The Second Wedding Night (2005)
- Mattotti (2006)
- Manual of Love 2 (2007)
- Days and Clouds (2007)
- A Question of the Heart (2009)
- Qualunquemente (2011)
- To Rome with Love (2012)
- Tutto tutto niente niente (2012)
- L'intrepido (2013)
- The Chair of Happiness (2013)
- The Big Score (2016)
- Mom or Dad? (2017)
- Like a Cat on a Highway (2017)
- Contromano (2018)
- Cetto c'è, senzadubbiamente (2019)
- Like a Cat on a Highway 2 (2021)
- Thank You Guys (2023)
- A Hundred Sundays (2023)
- A World Apart (2024)

=== Dubber ===
- Lucky and Zorba (1998)

=== Director ===
- Freshwater Man (1997)
- La fame e la sete (1999)
- Il nostro matrimonio è in crisi (2002)
- Contromano (2018)
- A Hundred Sundays (2023)
- Lavoreremo da grandi (2026)
