= Valerio Jalongo =

Italian film director and screenwriter (born 1960)

Valerio Sebastiano Jalongo
- Born: 11 May 1960; Rome, Italy
- Occupations: Film director Screenwriter
- Years active: 1983-present

Valerio Jalongo (born 11 May 1960) is an Italian film director and screenwriter.

== Life and career ==
Jalongo was born in Rome. Graduated in Philosophy, he attended the Gaumont School of Cinema, founded by producer Renzo Rossellini, and also studied Cinema at the University of Southern California in Los Angeles.

His directorial debut came in 1983 with Juke box, an anthology film directed as well by Carlo Carlei, Daniele Luchetti, Antonello Grimaldi, and others casting Massimo Bonetti, Philippe Leroy, and Barbara De Rossi and screened at the Venice Film Festival.

In 1988, Jalongo made DreamCity, a documentary film shot in Los Angeles which won the Vittorio De Sica Prize the same year.

His first feature film was Spaghetti Slow (1997) starring Brendan Gleeson and Ivano Marescotti, shot in Dublin. In 2004, he directed Sulla mia pelle, featuring Donatella Finocchiaro and Ivan Franek.

In 2009, his documentary Di me cosa ne sai (What Do You Know About Me) was presented at the 66th Venice International Film Festival (Venice Days) where it received the "Federazione italiana dei circoli del cinema" Prize. The film analyzes the cinema crisis of the seventies that caused the flight of Dino De Laurentiis, Carlo Ponti, and other big producers from Italy to United States and the related phenomena marking the gradual disappearance of Italian cinema from the international market.

In 2010, he wrote and directed La scuola è finita, a feature movie starring Valeria Golino and Vincenzo Amato, presented at the Rome Film Festival, Montreal World Film Festival and Bangkok Italian Film Festival the following year.

He then realised a documentary about art and science, The Sense of Beauty, made at CERN in Geneva, and presented at Nyon Film Festival, Visions du Réel in 2017, selected as one of the best 20 Europeans documentaries at Prix Europa 2018 in Berlin, at Visioni dal Mondo 2017 as opening title, and in other international festivals. The Sense of Beauty was also introduced by over 150 scientists in Italian and Swiss movie theatres, remaining on schedule in theatres for over six months.

In 2021, he made Water Is Taught by Thirst, a high school class story shot in 15 years, documenting the life of a class and its teacher throughout successive reunions. Nominated for Nastro d'argento in 2022, was in competition at the 51° Nyon Film Festival, Visions du Réel, and selected as best film at the 6° International Festival Visioni dal Mondo.

Jalongo is also a film language teacher.

== Filmography as director ==
- 1985: Juke box (several directors)
- 1988: DreamCity (doc)
- 1996: Il caso Bebawi (The Bebawi Affair) (TV-movie)
- 1997: Spaghetti Slow
- 1998: Torniamo a casa (Let's Go Home) (TV-movie)
- 2004: Sulla mia pelle (On My Skin)
- 2005: R.I.S. (Scientific Police) (TV-series) (co-director)
- 2009: What Do You Know About Me (doc)
- 2010: La scuola è finita (The School Is Over)
- 2017: Il senso della bellezza, arte e scienza al CERN (The Sense of Beauty: Art and Science at CERN) (doc)
- 2021: L'acqua l'insegna la sete (Water Is Taught by Thirst) (doc)
- 2025: Wider than the Sky (doc)
