= Ascanio Celestini =

Italian actor, director, writer and playwright

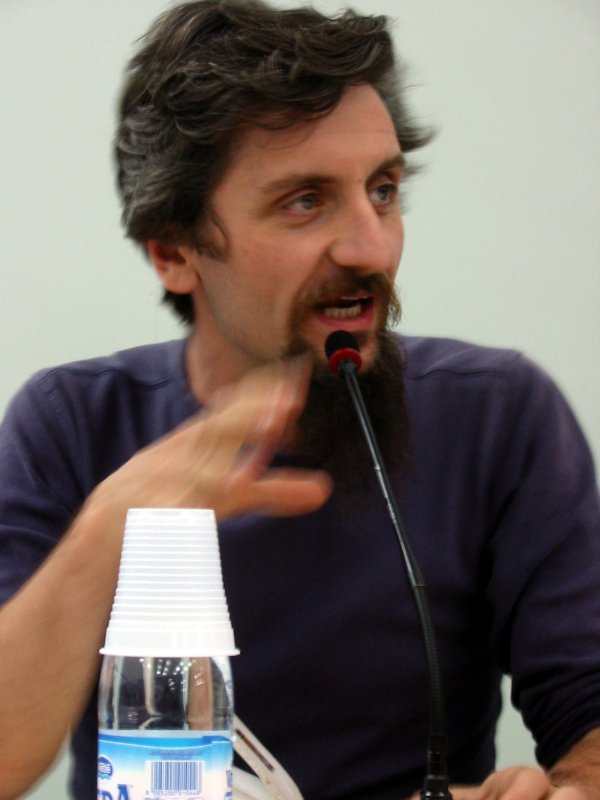
Ascanio Celestini at Turin International Book Fair in 2007

Ascanio Celestini (born 1 June 1972) is an Italian actor, director, writer and playwright.

== Biography ==
Born in Rome to parents with ancestry also from Lombardy and Veneto in northern Italy, Ascanio Celestini studied anthropology and literature at university. He approached the world of theatre in the late nineties, acting in some commedia dell'arte performances.

In 1998, along with Gaetano Ventriglia, Celestini wrote and performed in his first play, Cicoria. In fondo al mondo, Pasolini.

In the period from 1998 and 2000, he wrote the trilogy Milleuno, about the importance of the oral tradition.

He was the scriptwriter and actor in Radio clandestina (2000), a play on the Ardeatine massacre; followed by Cecafumo (2002), a retelling of some fairy tales from Italian folk tradition; Fabbrica (2002), a tale on three generations of workers, from the late 19th century to the nineties; Scemo di guerra. 4 giugno 1944 (2004, which premiered at the Venice Biennale) based on his father's war stories; La pecora nera. Elogio funebre del manicomio elettrico (2005), a story on asylums and the consumer society.

In 2002 he was awarded the special category of the Premio Ubu "for his ability of singing today's history as if it was a myth, and vice versa". In the following years, more than a dozen awards were attributed to his literary and theatrical texts.

In 2006 and 2007, he performed in Milan (Piccolo Teatro) and Brussels his play Appunti per un film sulla lotta di classe, an ever-changing performance whose attempt is to keep up with the variation of the situation of precarious work in Italy.

The style of his works can be defined as "teatro di narrazione". The actor-author acts as a filter between the public and the protagonists of the show. One of the main features of his plays is their minimalist setting, as well as the movements of the actors, which are reduced to a minimum. Most of his plays have become books and some of them (Storie di uno scemo di guerra, La pecora nera) were originally authentic novels.

In 2006 he participated in the film My Brother is an Only Child by Daniele Luchetti.

In 2007 he filmed the documentary Parole Sante, about the biggest Italian call centre of the time (in Cinecittà, Rome) and the precarious conditions of its workers. At the same time, Celestini released his first LP, also entitled Parole sante: a compilation of many of the songs of his plays and of the homonymous documentary and some unreleased tracks.

Celestini also participated several times in French and Belgian events (Festival de Liège, International Holocaust Remembrance Day in the Italian Institute of Culture in Paris, Festival des Libertés), in Italian music festivals, radio broadcasts, TV programs and movies, and received a large number of awards for his performances and works.

== Awards ==
• 2002: Premio Ubu, special section
• 2004: Premio Gassman, best young talent
• 2005: Premio Fiesole Under 40 Fiction
• 2005: Premio Ubu, new Italian works section
• 2006: Premio Flaiano
• 2006: Premio Città del Diario, awarded by the Archivio Diaristico Nazionale
• 2010: Sulmonacinema Film Festival: Best Actor for the movie La pecora nera
• 2011: Ciak d'oro 2011, Miglior Opera Prima, for the movie La pecora near.
• 2011: Bobbio Film Festival: Premio "Gobbo d'oro" for the Best Movie of 2011, for the movie La pecora nera
• 2011: Premio Dessì
• 2016: Animavì - Cinema d'Animazione e Arte Poetica, Bronzo Dorato Arte teatrale

== Works ==
=== Plays ===
• Cecafumo. Storie da leggere ad alta voce. Roma, Donzelli, 2002 (testo e CD audio)
• Fabbrica. Racconto teatrale in forma di lettera. Roma, Donzelli, 2003 (testo e CD audio)
• Radio Clandestina. Memoria delle Fosse ardeatine. Roma, Donzelli, 2005 (testo e DVD; con un'introduzione di Alessandro Portelli)
• Cicoria. In fondo al mondo, Pasolini (insieme a Gaetano Ventriglia), in Simone Soriani (a cura di), Cicoria. Del teatro di Ascanio Celestini e di Gaetano Ventriglia. Corazzano - PI, Titivillus 2006
• Laika 2015
• Che fine hanno fatto gli indiani pueblo? 2017

=== Fiction ===
• Storie di uno scemo di guerra. Roma, 4 giugno 1944. Torino, Einaudi, 2005
• La pecora nera. Elogio funebre del manicomio electrico. Torino, Einaudi 2006
• Lotta di Classe. Torino, Einaudi, 2009
• Io cammino in fila indiana. Torino, Einaudi, 2011
• Pro patria. Torino, Einaudi, 2012
• Barzellette. Torino, Einaudi, 2019

=== Discography ===
• Parole sante, Radio Fandango, 2007

=== Filmography ===
==== Actor ====
• My Brother Is an Only Child, directed by Daniele Luchetti (2006)
• A Question of the Heart, directed by Francesca Archibugi (2009)
• Tutti giù per aria, directed by Francesco Cordio (2009)
• Una montagna di balle, directed by Nicola Angrisano (2009)
• La pecora nera, directed by Ascanio Celestini (2010)
• Viva la sposa, directed by Ascanio Celestini (2015)
• Achille Tarallo, directed by Antonio Capuano (2018)

==== Director and screenwriter ====
• Senza paura - documentary (2004)
• Parole sante - documentary (2007)
• La pecora nera (2010)
• Viva la sposa (2015)
