= Alessandro Di Robilant =

Italian film director

- Born: 23 October 1953 (age 72)
- Education: London Film School
- Occupations: Film director Screenwriter
- Years active: 1985–present

Alessandro Di Robilant (born 23 October 1953) is an Italian film director and screenwriter. He has directed eleven films since 1985. His 1994 film Law of Courage was entered into the 44th Berlin International Film Festival where it won the Blue Angel Award.

He is a graduate of the London Film School.

== Filmography ==
- Anche lei fumava il sigaro (1985)
- Il nodo alla cravatta (1991)
- Law of Courage (1994)
- Vite blindate (1998) – TV film
- Un paese di sportivi (1998) – Documentary
- I fetentoni (1999)
- La voce nel sangue (1999) – TV film
- Forever (2003)
- L'uomo della carità (2007) – TV film
- Little Sea (2009)
- Mauro c'ha da fare (2013)
