= Giulio Manfredonia =

Italian film director and screenwriter (born 1967)

- Born: 3 November 1967 (age 57); Rome, Italy
- Occupations: Film director; screenwriter

Giulio Manfredonia (born 3 November 1967 in Rome) is an Italian film director and screenwriter.

== Biography ==
Manfredonia is the nephew of director Luigi Comencini. After working on several films as assistant director to Antonio Albanese, Luigi Comencini, and Cristina Comencini, Manfredonia made his debut as director in 2001 with the comedy Se fossi in te (If I Were You). He followed this in 2004 with È già ieri (It's Already Yesterday), a remake of the 1993 American comedy Groundhog Day, with Antonio Albanese reprising Bill Murray's role. In 2008, he directed We Can Do That. In 2011, 2012, and 2019, he worked with Albanese again in the films Qualunquemente (Whatever), Tutto tutto niente niente (Everything Everything Nothing Nothing), and Cetto c'è, senzadubbiamente (It's Cetto, Without a Doubt) respectively.

== Filmography ==
As assistant director

- La fame e la sete (1999)

As director

- È già ieri (2004)
- Tutto tutto niente niente (2012)
- Mafia and Red Tomatoes (2014)
- Non dirlo al mio capo (2016 - 12 episodes)
- Cetto c'è, senzadubbiamente (2019)

As director and screenwriter

- Se fossi in te (2001)
- We Can Do That (2008)
- Qualunquemente (2011)

As screenwriter

- Tanti auguri (short film) (1998)
- Giornalisti (TV series) (2000)
- Di me cosa ne sai (2009)
- Fosca Innocenti (2022)

== Awards and recognition ==
- Nastro d'Argento - Best Short Film for Tanti auguri (1999)
- Venice Film Festival - EIUC Prize - with Giobbe Covatta (2005)
- David di Donatello (2009)
  - David Youth Award for We Can Do That
  - Nominated for David di Donatello for Best Film for We Can Do That
  - Nominated for David di Donatello for Best Director for We Can Do That
  - Nominated for David di Donatello for Best Screenplay for We Can Do That
- FICE Award for We Can Do That (2009)
- Nastro d'Argento (2009)
  - Best Theme for We Can Do That
  - Nominated for Best Comedy for We Can Do That
- Golden Graal - Best Comedy Director for We Can Do That
- Festival du cinéma italien de Bastia (2010)
  - Special mention for We Can Do That
  - Nominated for Grand Jury Prize for We Can Do That
- Nastro d'Argento (2011)
  - Nominated for Best Comedy for Qualunquemente
