= On My Skin (2003 film) =

- Directed by: Valerio Jalongo
- Starring: Ivan Franěk; Vincenzo Peluso; Stefano Cassetti; Donatella Finocchiaro
- Cinematography: Alessandro Pesci
- Music by: Paolo Buonvino
- Release date: 2003
- Country: Italy
- Language: Italian

On My Skin (Italian: Sulla mia pelle, also known as Upon My Skin) is a 2003 Italian crime drama film written and directed by Valerio Jalongo. It was screened in competition at the 2003 Turin Film Festival.

== Cast ==
- Ivan Franek as Tony
- Donatella Finocchiaro as Bianca
- Vincenzo Peluso as Alfonso
- Mario Scarpetta as Cesare Boccia
- Stefano Cassetti as Sauro

== See also ==
- List of Italian films of 2003
