= A Hundred Sundays =

2023 drama film

- Directed by: Antonio Albanese
- Screenplay by: Antonio Albanese; Piero Guerrera
- Starring: Antonio Albanese
- Cinematography: Roberto Forza
- Edited by: Davide Miele
- Music by: Giovanni Sollima
- Release date: 2023
- Language: Italian

A Hundred Sundays (Italian: Cento domeniche, also spelled as 100 Sundays) is a 2023 Italian drama film co-written, directed and starring Antonio Albanese.

== Cast ==
- Antonio Albanese as Antonio Riva
- Donatella Bartoli as Egle
- Liliana Bottone as Emilia
- Sandra Ceccarelli as Margherita
- Elio De Capitani as Carlo Bonacina
- Maurizio Donadoni as Umberto
- Giulia Lazzarini as Sara
- Bebo Storti as Maurizio
- Marianna Folli as Maddalena

== Production ==
Albanese shot the film in his hometown Lecco.

== Release ==
The film premiered out of competition at the 18th Rome Film Festival. It was released in Italian cinemas on 16 November 2023.

== Reception ==
The film grossed 2 million euros at the Italian box office. For his performance, Albanese received David di Donatello and Nastro d'Argento nominations for best actor.

Paolo Baldini of Corriere della Sera called the film "a blade in the collective consciousness", praising the courage shown by Albanese "to be able to put aside his enormous television popularity", in order to try his hand at "a socially critical, passionate cinema". According to Il Giornale film critic Pedro Armocida, "A Hundred Sundays is a dry, essential, sober, sharp and fierce film. But, above all, it is a respectable film, like its main character, at a time when this adjective does not necessarily seem to be a value".
