= Silvio Forever =

2011 film by Roberto Faenza

- Poster
- Directed by: Roberto Faenza
- Release date: 25 March 2011
- Country: Italy
- Language: Italian

Silvio Forever is a 2011 Italian biographical documentary directed by Roberto Faenza. The film is a documentary about the life of Silvio Berlusconi.

== Content ==
The film is an unauthorised biographical portrayal of Berlusconi. It consists of original interviews as well as archive footage with narration by Neri Marcorè providing an impression of Berlusconi's voice.

== Reception ==
Critics have found the film comparable to an earlier portrayal of Italian politicians by Faenza, Forza Italia! (1977).
