= Franco Bernini =

Italian director and screenwriter

- Born: 5 June 1954 (age 70); Viterbo
- Occupation(s): film director and screenwriter

Franco Bernini (born in 1954) is an Italian director and screenwriter.

Born in Viterbo, Bernini entered the cinema industry in 1987 as a sound screenwriter, and was a close collaborator of Carlo Mazzacurati and Daniele Luchetti. After directing two television films, in 1997 he directed The Grey Zone, for which he won the Grolla d'oro for best screenplay.
