= Carlo Mazzacurati =

Italian film director and screenwriter

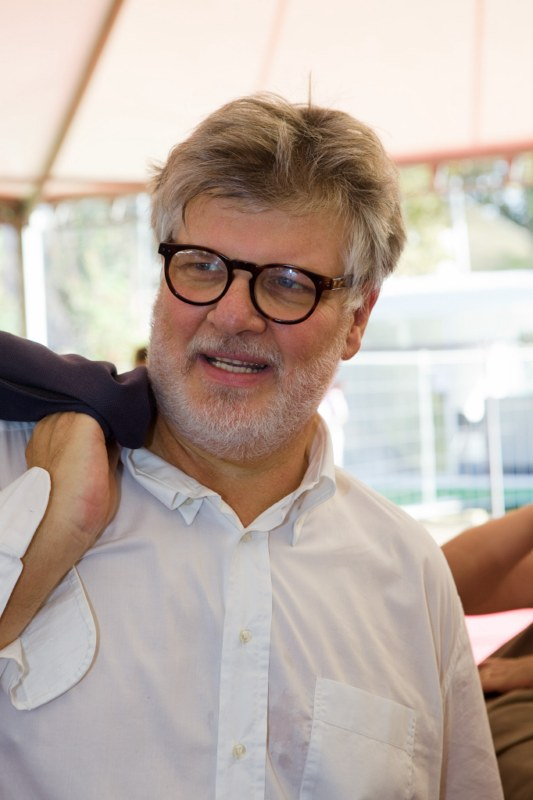
- Born: 2 March 1956; Padua, Italy
- Died: 22 January 2014 (aged 57); Padua, Italy
- Education: University of Bologna
- Occupations: Director, Screenwriter
- Years active: 1979–2014

Carlo Mazzacurati (2 March 1956 – 22 January 2014) was an Italian film director and screenwriter born in Padua. He started his cinema career in 1980.

His better known films include The Bull (1994) and Holy Tongue (2000). He was educated and graduated from University of Bologna.

Mazzacurati died in Padua. He was an atheist. He was married to Marina Zangirolami until his death.

== Partial filmography ==
=== Director ===
- Italian Night (1987)
- The Handsome Priest(1989)
- Un'altra vita (1992)
- The Bull (1994)
- L'estate di Davide (1998)
- Holy Tongue (2000)
- A Cavallo della Tigre (2002)
- An Italian Romance (2004)
- The Right Distance (2007)
- La Passione (2010)
- Medici con l'Africa (2012)
- The Chair of Happiness (2013)

=== Screenwriter ===
- Marrakesh Express (1989)
