= Duato =

Duato is a surname. Notable people with the surname include:

- Ana Duato (born 1968), Spanish actress
- Joaquin Duato (born 1962), Spanish-American businessman
- Jose Duato (born 1958), Spanish professor
- Nacho Duato (born 1957), Spanish ballet dancer and choreographer
