= Conta-me como foi =

Portuguese television drama series

- Genre: Historical drama; Comedy drama
- Based on: Cuéntame cómo pasó
- Starring: Miguel Guilherme; Rita Blanco; Catarina Avelar; Rita Brütt; Fernando Pires; Luís Ganito
- Narrated by: Luís Lucas
- Country of origin: Portugal
- Original language: Portuguese
- No. of seasons: 8
- No. of episodes: 156

Production
- Production location: Lisbon
- Production company: SP Televisão for Rádio e Televisão de Portugal

Original release
- Network: RTP1
- Release: 22 April 2007 – 25 April 2011
- Release: 7 December 2019 – 16 September 2023

Conta-me como foi (transl. Tell me how it was) is a Portuguese television drama series which was broadcast on RTP1 of Rádio e Televisão de Portugal from 2007 to 2011 and from 2019 to 2023. It recounts the experiences of a middle-class family, the Lopes (Portuguese: Os Lopes), during the last years of the Estado Novo and the early years of the current Third Republic.

== Development ==
The first episode was broadcast on 22 April 2007. The series begins in March 1968 with the arrival of television to the house of the Lopes just in time to watch the 5th edition of the Grande Prémio TV da Canção Portuguesa. The last episode of the fifth season was broadcast on 25 April 2011 with the Lopes living the Carnation Revolution on 25 April 1974.

In February 2019, RTP announced that the series, after eight years shelved, would be renewed for fifty-two more episodes, with the storyline moving firmly into the 1980s. The first episode of the sixth season was broadcast on 7 December 2019 with the Lopes entering 1984.

The series is an adaptation of Cuéntame cómo pasó, a Spanish series by Televisión Española starring Imanol Arias and Ana Duato. It has also been adapted in Italy by RAI as Raccontami with Massimo Ghini and Lunetta Savino, in Argentina by Televisión Pública Argentina as Cuéntame cómo pasó with Nicolás Cabré and Malena Solda and in Greece by ERT as Ta Kalytera mas Chronia with Meletis Elias and Katerina Papoutsaki.

== Plot ==
António Lopes (Miguel Guilherme) and Margarida Marques (Rita Blanco) are a married couple that have emigrated in the 1960s from Ermidão, a –fictional– small village inland, to a –also fictional– working-class suburb in Lisbon, along with her mother Hermínia (Catarina Avelar) and their three children, Isabel (Rita Brütt), Tóni (Fernando Pires) and Carlos (Luís Ganito) seeking a better life away from the hardships of an impoverished countryside. António works as a clerk at the Ministry of Finance in the mornings and at Eng. Ramires' (José Raposo) printing house in the afternoons. Margarida and Hermínia make trousers for a department store at home while doing the housekeeping. Isabel works at Clara's (Maria João Abreu) hair salon along with Náni (Sandra Santos), Tóni is starting a master's degree in Law making him the first Lopes going to university and Carlos spends his school days with his best friends Marinho (Manuel Alves) and Luís (Francisco Madeira). With great effort and hard work they are able to purchase in installments their first television set, their first washing machine and even their first car.

The Lopes' story is narrated from an indefinite present by an adult Carlos (voiced by Luís Lucas). Their story is directly and indirectly affected by the events and the social, economical and political changes occurring in Portugal since the late 1960s until the late 1980s. The Lopes are also direct and indirect witness of the historic acts occurring those days.

== Cast and characters ==
=== Lopes Family ===
Character	Portrayed by	Seasons							
Character	Portrayed by	1	2	3	4	5	6	7	8
António Lopes	Miguel Guilherme	Main	Main	Main	Main	Main	Main	Main	Main
Maria Margarida Marques	Rita Blanco	Main	Main	Main	Main	Main	Main	Main	Main
Hermínia Marques	Catarina Avelar	Main	Main	Main	Main	Main	Main	Main	Main
Maria Isabel Marques Lopes	Rita Brütt	Main	Main	Main	Main	Main	Main	Main	Main
António José Marques Lopes (Tóni)	Fernando Pires	Main	Main	Main	Main	Main	Main	Main	Main
Carlos Manuel Marques Lopes	Luís Ganito	Main	Main	Main	Main	Main	Main	Main	Main
Carlos Manuel Marques Lopes	Luís Lucas	Voice	Voice	Voice	Voice	Voice	Voice	Voice	Voice

== Episodes ==
Season	Episodes	Originally released		Avg. viewers	Avg. share	Setting
Season	Episodes	First released	Last released	Avg. viewers	Avg. share	Setting
1	9	22 April 2007	22 June 2007	614 835	6.4%	March 1968 – September 1968
2	31	30 September 2007	15 June 2008	TBA	TBA	October 1968 – October 1969
3	17	4 January 2009	26 April 2009	804 583	8.5%	November 1969 – May 1970
4	23	17 October 2009	16 May 2010	589 337	6.1%	June 1970 – May 1972
5	24	14 November 2010	25 April 2011	674 292	7.0%	August 1972 – 25 April 1974
6	19	7 December 2019	25 April 2020	577 964	6.0%	31 December 1983 – December 1984
7	18	3 October 2020	30 January 2021	TBA	TBA	December 1984 – March 1986
8	15	3 June 2023	16 September 2023	TBA	TBA	April 1986 – July 1987
