= Ta Kalytera mas Chronia =

- Also known as: Remember When
- Greek: Τα Καλύτερά μας Χρόνια
- Genre: Drama, historical, comedy
- Based on: Cuéntame cómo pasó
- Starring: Katerina Papoutsaki; Meletis Elias
- Narrated by: Vassilis Charalampopoulos
- Country of origin: Greece
- Original language: Greek
- No. of seasons: 3
- No. of episodes: 170

Production
- Running time: 43–49 min.
- Production company: Tanweer Productions for ERT

Original release
- Network: ERT1
- Release: 15 October 2020 – 20 June 2023

Ta Kalytera mas Chronia (Greek: Τα Καλύτερά μας Χρόνια, transl. Our Best Years), also known in English as Remember When, is a Greek prime-time television drama series that originally ran on ERT1 for three seasons, from 15 October 2020 to 20 June 2023. It recounts the experiences of the Antonopoulos family during the Regime of the Colonels, the Greek transition to democracy and the first years of the democratic Third Hellenic Republic.

== Development ==
The series is an adaptation of Cuéntame cómo pasó, a Spanish series by Televisión Española starring Imanol Arias and Ana Duato. It has also been adapted in Portugal by RTP as Conta-me como foi with Miguel Guilherme and Rita Blanco, in Argentina by Televisión Pública Argentina as Cuéntame cómo pasó with Nicolás Cabré and Malena Solda and in Italy by RAI as Raccontami with Massimo Ghini and Lunetta Savino,

The first episode was broadcast on 15 October 2020. The series begins in July 1969 with the arrival of television to the house of the Antonopoulos just in time to watch the Moon landing of Apollo 11. The story reflects the changes in Greece since then.

== Plot ==
Stelios and Maria are a married couple that have emigrated in the 1960s from a small village in Messenia, to a working-class suburb in Athens, along with her mother Ermioni and their three children, Elpida, Antonis and Angelos seeking a better life away from the hardships of an impoverished countryside.

The Antonopoulos' story is narrated from an indefinite present by an adult Angelos. Their story is directly and indirectly affected by the events and the social, economical and political changes occurring in Greece from the late 1960s until the early 1980s.

== Cast ==
The cast of the series is led by those of the Antonopoulos family:

- Katerina Papoutsaki as Maria Antonopoulou
- Meletis Elias as Stelios Antonopoulos
- Yvonni Maltezou as Ermioni
- Tzeni Theona as Nana
- Erifyli Kitzoglou as Elpida Antonopoulou
- Dimitris Kapouranis as Antonis Antonopoulos
- Manolis Gkinis as Angelos Antonopoulos
- Vassilis Charalampopoulos as the voice of adult Angelos Antonopoulos

== Episodes ==
Season	Episodes	Originally aired	
Season	Episodes	First aired	Last aired
1	66	15 October 2020	18 June 2021
1	66	28 September 2021	19 October 2021
2	64	26 October 2021	19 April 2022
2	64	20 September 2022	13 December 2022
3	40	17 January 2023	20 June 2023
