= Cuéntame cómo pasó =

Spanish television series (2001–2023)

- Also known as: Cuéntame; Remember When
- Genre: Historical drama; Comedy drama
- Created by: Miguel Ángel Bernardeau
- Starring: Imanol Arias; Ana Duato; Ricardo Gómez; María Galiana; Pablo Rivero; Irene Visedo
- Narrated by: Carlos Hipólito
- Opening theme: "Cuéntame"
- Country of origin: Spain
- Original language: Spanish
- No. of seasons: 23
- No. of episodes: 413 + 9 unnumbered

Production
- Executive producer: Miguel Ángel Bernardeau
- Production locations: Pinto (Madrid); Arahuetes (Segovia)
- Cinematography: Tote Trenas
- Running time: 60–90 mins
- Production company: Grupo Ganga for Televisión Española

Original release
- Network: La 1; TVE Internacional
- Release: 13 September 2001 – 29 November 2023

Related
- Raccontami; Conta-me como foi; Cuéntame cómo pasó; Ta Kalytera mas Chronia

Cuéntame cómo pasó (transl. Tell me how it happened), usually shortened to Cuéntame and also known in English as Remember When, is a Spanish prime-time television historical drama series that originally ran on La 1 of Televisión Española for twenty-three seasons, from 13 September 2001 to 29 November 2023. It recounts the experiences of a middle-class family, the Alcántaras (Spanish: Los Alcántara), during the years of Francisco Franco's rule, the transition to democracy, and the current democracy.

Cuéntame cómo pasó received critical acclaim throughout most of its run and received numerous national and international awards, making it the most awarded series in the history of Spanish television. With twenty-three seasons, 413 episodes and nine unnumbered special episodes it is also the longest running scripted primetime Spanish series in the history of television. It was the most expensive Spanish series to produce for many seasons, and taking into account its total cost, it is the costliest Spanish series of all time.

With a stable cast led by Imanol Arias and Ana Duato as Antonio Alcántara and Mercedes Fernández, more than three thousand performers have appeared in the series. It has also spawned foreign adaptations in Italy, Portugal, Argentina, and Greece.

== Production ==
=== Development ===
Cuéntame cómo pasó was conceived by producer Miguel Ángel Bernardeau with the idea of reviewing the near past from the present. He was joined by Eduardo Ladrón de Guevara and Patrick Buckley to write the first scripts and the series bible in 1993. They offered the project to all the television networks in Spain for eight years, which continually rejected it because it talked about Francoism, until Televisión Española (TVE) finally picked it up. To produce the series for TVE they created the production company Grupo Ganga.

The first episode was broadcast on 13 September 2001. The series begins in April 1968 with the arrival of television to the house of the Alcántaras just in time to watch the victory of Massiel at the Eurovision Song Contest. The story reflects the changes in Spain from that day on recounting the family's experiences and the impact that television had. Through situations, characters, and attitudes of the era, the series evokes a wistful reminiscence of those times. The Alcántaras' story is narrated in flashback from an indefinite present. The narration sometimes goes back even further to show the youth of the characters. Season twenty-one is the first and only time the series shows that present, with the characters facing 1992 and their thirty years older selves facing COVID-19 pandemic alternately.

Initially the series was to be titled Nuestro Ayer, but it finally was titled Cuéntame. This name comes from the 1960s well-known song used as the series opening theme. In March 2002, during the first season, the title was changed to Cuéntame cómo pasó because Cuéntame was already registered.

The series also celebrates the first twenty-five years since Spain's transition to democracy, and its didactic spirit is clearly evident in some of the episodes. In themed special episodes (Note: The nine unnumbered episodes are themed special episodes, but there are also twenty special episodes that are numbered and are counted in the official episode numeration. None of them advances the plot of the series and among them there are making-of episodes, recapitulations, and documentaries on a specific topic or on a historical event experienced in the series.) it includes documentary interviews with historical figures of the era speaking about how they experienced important historic events like the assassination of then Prime Minister Luis Carrero Blanco or the death of Francisco Franco.

It was the most expensive Spanish series to produce during much of its run. The most expensive season was season thirteen, which cost €903,440 on average per episode, followed by season twelve (€852,989), and season fourteen (€830,286). The 280 numbered episodes from episode fifteen of season eight to the end of the series had a cost of just over €730,000 on average per episode, with a total cost of €204,711,125. The 27% of that total cost (some €54.9 million) was dedicated to paying the cast, and another 26% was dedicated to paying the technical staff. Taking into account its total cost, it is the Spanish series that has cost the most of all time.

In March 2020, TVE and Grupo Ganga announced that, after its twentieth season, it would be renewed for two more seasons, with the storyline moving firmly into the 1990s. On 16 February 2023, TVE green-lighted the production of season twenty-three that closed the series with the storyline ending in 2001.

=== Production team ===
Cuéntame cómo pasó was a production of Televisión Española and Grupo Ganga, and had the participation of Amazon Prime Video in its last four seasons. Miguel Ángel Bernardeau was the executive producer of the series for its entirety. Each episode was entrusted to one or two scriptwriters, unlike what was common in Spain where a group of scriptwriters used to work on an episode at the same time. More than thirty writers had contributed to the series. The most prolific were Eduardo Ladrón de Guevara, Sonia Sánchez, Jacobo Delgado, Alberto Macías, Ignacio del Moral, Patrick Buckley, and Joaquín Oristrell. Other writers who have written some of the episodes include Curro Royo, Ángeles González-Sinde, Cecilia Bartolomé, and Yolanda García Serrano.

The series's most prolific directors were Agustín Crespi and Antonio Cano. Other directors who have directed some of the episodes include Óscar Aibar, Tito Fernández, Sergio Cabrera, Antonio Cuadri, Manuel Gómez Pereira, Gracia Querejeta, and Ignacio Mercero. The series cinematographer was Tote Trenas.

=== Casting ===
The Alcántaras in season one: Mercedes, Inés, Toni, Herminia, Carlos, and Antonio

Since the first moment the producers were clear about Imanol Arias for the role of Antonio, the father of the family. The role of Mercedes, the mother of the family, was initially intended for Adriana Ozores, but Ana Duato (who was going to play the role of a visiting cousin), finally ended up with the role. María Galiana was selected for the role of Herminia, the grandmother, when the producer saw her in the 1999 film Alone. To choose the three children they did a casting, with the selection of the youngest being the most difficult of them. They chose Irene Visedo to play Inés, Pablo Rivero to play Toni, and Ricardo Gómez to play Carlos. For the initial supporting roles they selected well-known established actors such as Fernando Fernán Gómez, Tony Leblanc, José Sancho, Enrique San Francisco, Juan Echanove, and Alicia Hermida (who was also the director of interpretation), as well as new actors.

The Alcántaras in season twenty-three: Antonio, Mercedes, Herminia, Carlos, Toni, Inés, and María

The series has maintained a stable cast during its long run, with the same performer always playing the same role in the main timeline, even in sporadic roles. There have only been a few important cast changes, most notably the replacement of Inés, who is played by Pilar Punzano for five seasons in Visedo's absence, and the replacement by older performers of María (Alcantaras' fourth child, who arrived to the family taking advantage of Duato's real pregnancy) and the grandchildren due to the characters growing old faster than the performers. The main roles have been also played by other performers representing younger and older versions of the character in earlier and later timelines, including Arias' own son (Daniel Arias) and Duato's own daughter (María Bernardeau) playing the younger versions of Antonio and Mercedes. Those characters whose performer died were not recast. Arias and Duato are the only performers who appear in every episode.

=== Filming ===
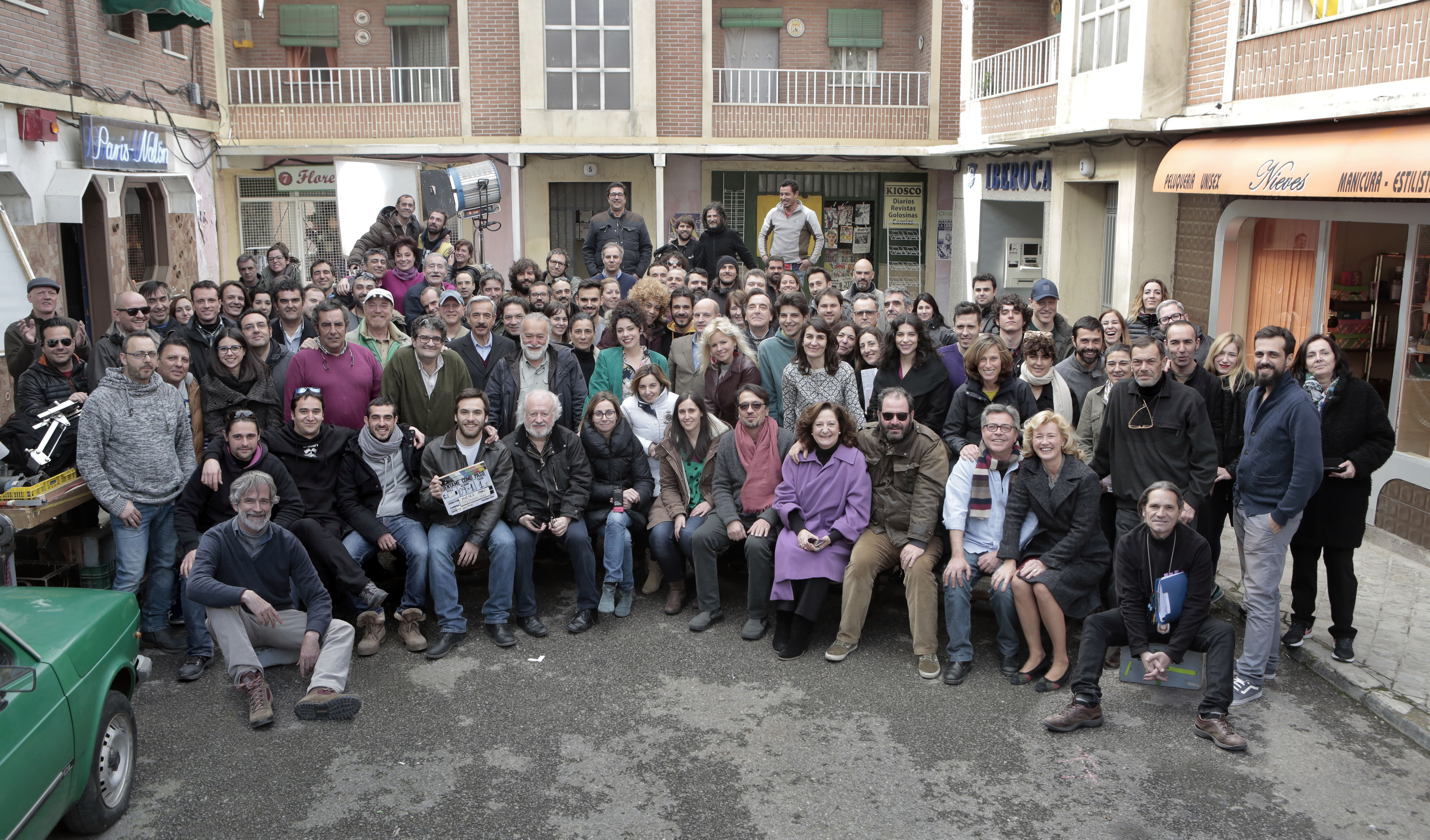
Cast and crew in the exterior set of San Genaro on the occasion of the end of filming for season eighteen.

Seasons one and two were filmed at the Barajas studios in Madrid. Starting with season three, the series was filmed at Grupo Ganga's studios in Pinto (Madrid), where an outdoor set represented the streets of fictional San Genaro, the Madrid neighborhood where the Alcántara family resides, and where the sound stages with the interior sets were located. The filming also made extensive use of real locations in Madrid and its surroundings conveniently dressed up to represent the era. They also filmed on location in Barcelona, Benidorm, Brussels, Ibiza, Lisbon, London, Moscow, Paris, Rome, and Tangier among others.

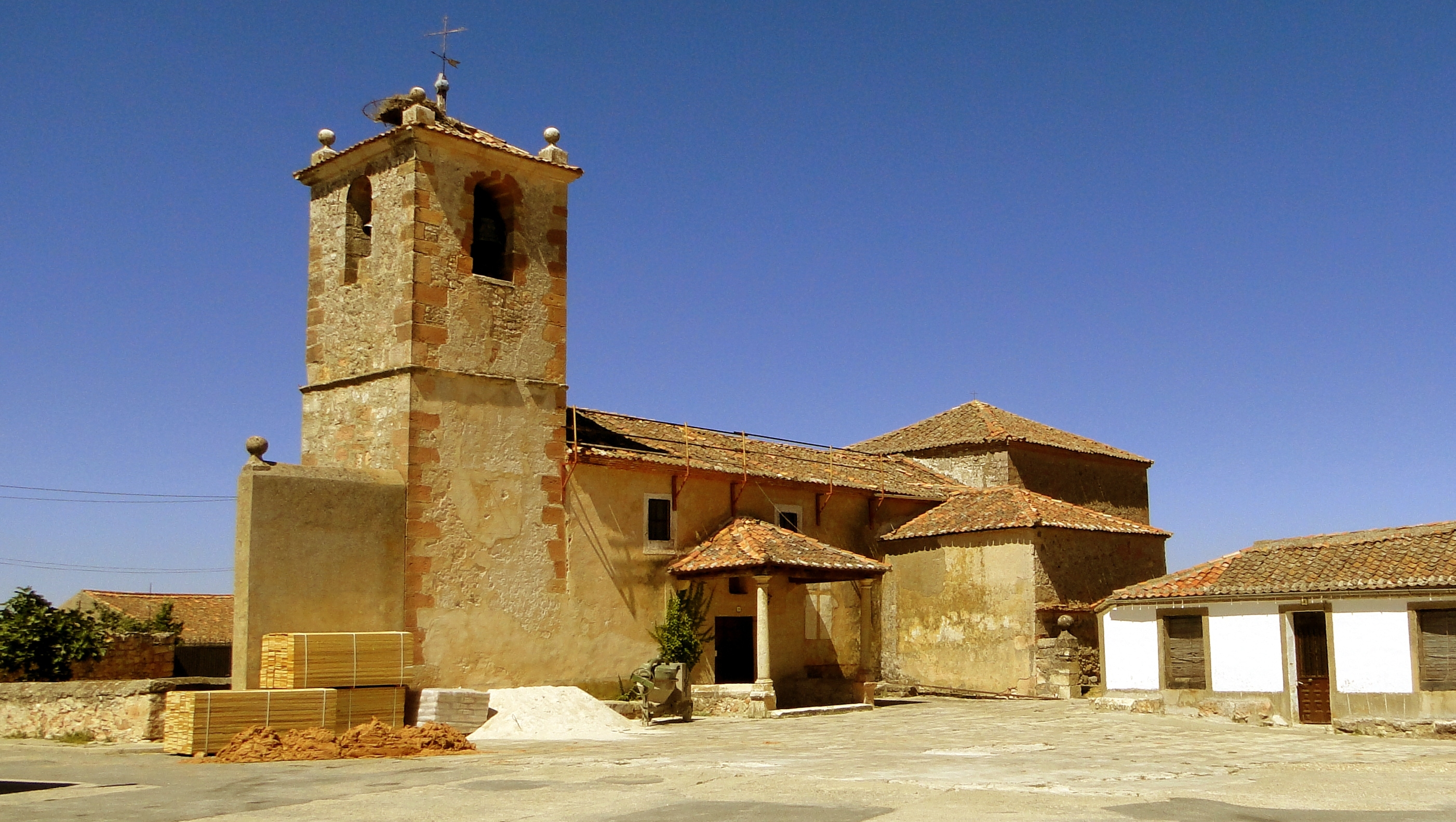
Main square of Arahuetes with fictitious Herminia's house in Sagrillas on the right.

The filming of the exterior scenes located in fictitious Sagrillas, the hometown of the family, was carried out mainly in Arahuetes (Segovia), with some scenes filmed in its surrounding towns. A house in the main square of Arahuetes acts as Herminia's house and a house in another part of the village acts as that of Pura's (Antonio's mother). Their interior sets were built in the studios in Pinto with the others. The filming of the scenes in the family's vineyard and winery was carried out on an estate in Bargas (Toledo).

The series has recreated many historical events in which the Alcántaras have been involved, for which purpose-built full-scale period sets, real locations, or CGI techniques were used for filming. The series also uses dream sequences extensively to show the characters' desires, fears, and inner thoughts.

In post-production, the footage filmed was given a chromatic range based on grey and sepia similar to an old faded color photograph, which gives the series its characteristic early look. This was done to reflect the memory of the oppression of the time, and it gradually transitioned to a more colorful palette as the story progressed and the oppression disappeared. Initially shot in fullscreen, they switched to widescreen when the plot overtook Franco's death. It was also one of the first Spanish series filmed in High Definition, for which they used the HDCAM format, even before TVE (which still used the Digital Betacam format) could broadcast in HD.

=== Theme song and title sequence ===
The opening theme song used in the title sequence, and that gives the series its name, is the 1968 song "Cuéntame", written by José Luis Armenteros, and made famous by the pop band Fórmula V back then. The song underwent eleven different arrangements and musical styles over the years and is performed by well-known singers. The first version is sung by Ana Belén and David San José and is used in the first nine seasons. The second version is sung by Pitingo and is used in season ten. The third version is sung by Rosario Flores, titled her ninth studio album, and is used in season eleven. The fourth version is sung by Alejo Stivel, former member of the rock band Tequila, and is used in season twelve. The fifth version is sung by Estrella Morente and is used in season thirteen. The sixth version is sung by Miguel Bosé and is used in season fourteen. The seventh version is sung by the rock band Los Secretos and is used in seasons fifteen and sixteen. The eighth version is sung by Miguel Ríos and is used in seasons seventeen, eighteen and nineteen. The ninth version is sung by Ana Torroja and is used in season twenty. The tenth version is sung by Rozalén and is used in season twenty-one. The eleventh version is sung by Raphael and is used in season twenty-two. The first version, sung by Ana Belén and David San José, is used again in season twenty-three.

== Plot ==
=== Origins ===
Antonio Alcántara and Mercedes Fernández are a married couple that have emigrated in the 1960s from Sagrillas, a (fictional) small village in the province of Albacete, (Note: Although Sagrillas is a fictional town that does not exist, its location is between the real towns Tobarra and Hellín.) to San Genaro, a (also fictional) working-class suburb in Madrid, along with her mother Herminia and their three children, Inés, Toni, and Carlos seeking a better life away from the hardships of an impoverished countryside. Antonio works as an office assistant at the Ministry of Agriculture headquarters in the mornings and at Don Pablo's printing house in the afternoons. Mercedes and Herminia make trousers for a department store at home while doing the housekeeping. Inés works at Nieves' hair salon across the street along with Pili, Toni is starting a law degree, making him the first Alcántara going to university and Carlos spends his school days with his best friends Josete and Luis. With great effort and hard work they are able to purchase in instalments their first television set, their first washing machine, their first car (a SEAT 800) and even spend their first vacations at Benidorm where they see the sea for the first time.

=== Antonio ===
As time goes by, Antonio leaves his jobs at the Ministry and the printing house to work for Don Pablo in other business ventures. One of them, the building company Construcciones Nueva York turns out to be a large fraud planned by Don Pablo and his partners in order to embezzle the funds and blame Antonio. Antonio is taken to court, the truth is revealed in the trial and finally Don Pablo is convicted and imprisoned. Meanwhile, he starts working in another printing house, Gráficas Usillos, a business that he eventually purchases and renames Alcántara Rotopress. He stands in the first free democratic general election after Franco's death, on the list of UCD for the Congress of Deputies for the Albacete constituency. He does not get the seat but he is directly appointed by Adolfo Suárez, General Director of Agrarian Production of the Ministry of Agriculture under the Second Suárez Cabinet, a position in the same office where he worked in a subordinate role years before. With his new position and with the printing house running well, the family is able to move their residence from the humble San Genaro to the upper class Salamanca neighbourhood. He sells the printing house, is removed from the position in the Ministry and he starts a flags and banners factory named Estandartes y Banderas alongside his best friend Desi. When the Banco de Granada, the bank where Antonio and Mercedes have all their savings and the mortgage of the Salamanca neighbourhood apartment, declares bankruptcy, their financial situation becomes precarious and they have to move back to San Genaro, selling their luxurious apartment at a loss in order to cover their debts. After this, he starts an olive oil distribution business with his brother Miguel, but their business is ruined when they are falsely accused of causing the toxic oil syndrome. Antonio becomes addicted to gambling, his health worsens when he develops angina and he has an affair that puts his marriage in jeopardy. With the money recovered from the Banco de Granada years after its bankruptcy, and the land the family own in Sagrillas, they open up the vineyard and winery Bodega Alcántara Fernández e Hijos and they run the business until a devastating fire destroys the winery. He starts a travel agency named Viajes Milano and he even gets a licence to drive coaches. After a while, he manages to rebuild the winery and resume business.

=== Mercedes ===
Mercedes, tired of sewing trousers, starts to design and sell her own outfits. The sales go well, so she teams up with Nieves to open a boutique named Meyni in the hair salon premises, hiring Pili as shop assistant and using the back room as a workshop. As the business prospers, Don Pablo decides to invest his money in it, and the clothing production is moved to a fully equipped dressmaking factory at Don Pablo's premises, hiring a team of dressmakers and even hiring Antonio and Desi as salesmen. Meyni reaches its peak of success when they run a fashion show in front of Carmen Polo, but the company does not outlast the economic crisis and they eventually have to close the factory. After Nieves' departure, Mercedes teams up with Pili to convert the boutique into a unisex hair salon. After giving birth to María, the Alcántaras' fourth child, she decides to finish her secondary school studies and even completes a degree in Economics. She also works for some time as a real estate agent. She suffers a health scare when she is diagnosed with breast cancer and has a mastectomy. With her experience in design and in the fashion industry she starts a firm to make swimwear for women recovering from mastectomies and once completely recovered she is one of the first women in Spain to undergo a breast reconstruction. In the family winery she takes care of the bookkeeping. To help battered women in a shelter she teaches them sewing first and she transforms the sewing workshop into a firm to make clothing for women of all sizes later. After having to close the company due to not being able to compete against textile offshoring, she opens a small dressmaking shop in the neighborhood.

=== Inés ===
Inés, after breaking up with her lifelong boyfriend, travels to London with Nieves. There she falls in love with Mike and she decides not to come back. When they break up, she returns and she starts an acting career with the help of Eugenio, the new San Genaro parish's young priest. When Mike appears in Madrid looking for her, she decides to follow him to Ibiza to live in a hippie commune. Antonio and Mercedes try by all means to take her back but she doesn't return until she becomes disillusioned with her life there. Back in Madrid she helps Eugenio with the social events in the parish. They spend so much time together that they finally fall in love. Eugenio undergoes secularization and they get married. Inés continues with her acting career and she is wrongly linked with a member of the terrorist group ETA for which she is arrested and imprisoned. When released, whilst awaiting court and pregnant, she decides to escape to France with Eugenio, where their son Antonio Oriol is born and where they break up. Later she moves to Argentina with Oriol. She is able to return to Spain after the amnesty is promulgated. Once in Madrid she gets into La Movida Madrileña nightlife scene and becomes addicted to drugs, while Oriol lives with Eugenio in Cuenca. When the family becomes aware of her addiction, they take her to Sagrillas and help her to get clean. After this, her acting career starts to take off, having the leading role in several movies and stage plays. When Eugenio dies in a car accident, Inés takes Oriol to live with her. In the family winery she helps Antonio with the foreign orders. She has a relationship with Marcos for some time. After many years apart, she runs into Mike and they end up getting married. She strengthens her career by teaching theater and directing stage plays.

=== Toni ===
Toni becomes embroiled in political struggle while finishing his degree, along with his young love Marta, actively protesting against the Régime. After university, he does his compulsory military service and starts working as a journalist in the newspaper Pueblo. There he is paired up with Juana, a photographer, whom he falls in love with and finally marries in Gibraltar. In the meantime, he quits his job at the newspaper when he is hired by Antonio to manage a magazine he is launching and to run his printing house. Later, he leaves those jobs to join a firm of labour lawyers. His marriage does not last long and Juana leaves him. After the separation and losing his job, he moves to Rome from where he returns immediately after he finds out about Mercedes' illness. Back in Madrid he starts working in a radio station. Two years after their breakup, he runs into Juana who is accompanied by a little boy named Santiago. Juana later reveals that she was pregnant when she left him, and that Santiago is his son. He moves to London, where Juana is living, to be near his son for some time. Back in Madrid he starts working as an investigative journalist, and puts his life in danger investigating several shady dealings. Fearing for his life and wanting to avoid putting his family in danger, he flees to London. When accepting a position in Televisión Española's news service, he decides to return to Madrid with his new fiancée Deborah, and he becomes a Telediario news anchor first and an Informe Semanal reporter later. Toni and Deborah get married and they have a daughter named Sol. He leaves his job in television when he is appointed General Director of Informative Relations under the Third González Cabinet. Afterwards, he works as a journalist for Diario 16, is PSOE's campaign manager for the 1996 general election, and starts an online newspaper with Samuel, a long-time colleague and Juana's husband.

=== Carlos ===
Carlos spends his early life going to school and playing in a vacant lot with Josete and Luis. He drives Antonio, Mercedes and Herminia crazy because he is a restless boy. When he is in high school, Karina and her mother move into the apartment next door. He gets into reading and writing and he wins a prize with a short story he writes. He starts dating Karina but the relationship has its ups and downs. Instead of starting a degree upon finishing high school, he decides to do his compulsory military service. There he meets Marcelo. After service, he starts a degree in Business Management in a private university, but he does not finish the first year. He opens a nightclub and he is accused of drug dealing. As he does not betray his business partner, who is the dealer, he is arrested and imprisoned. In prison he is attacked and almost dies, but is released when found to be innocent. After prison, he continues to write and he even publishes his first novel. He is also in a long sporadic relationship with Julia, his summer love from Sagrillas. When finding Luis in a bad way, he takes him to Sagrillas and helps him to recover, while taking care of the winery. When recovered, Luis takes over the winery's everyday management. Josete and Marcelo join them in Sagrillas and they all help Carlos to start a rural tourism small lodging at the cottage of his deceased paternal grandmother Pura. Karina marries another man and, after a one-night stand with Carlos, gets pregnant. She gives birth to a baby, Olivia, although it is not clear if she is Carlos' daughter or not, and when her husband finds out about the infidelity, they break up. Carlos takes care of her and the baby and, finally, he proposes and they get married. After some time working as a motorcycle courier he starts working in an advertising agency. Karina accepts a position in New York, Carlos follows her and there he starts to write down his family's story from the beginning.

=== Historic events ===
The Alcántaras' story is narrated from an indefinite present by the older Carlos. Their story is directly and indirectly affected by the events and the social, economical and political changes occurring in Spain from the late 1960s until the early 2000s. The Alcántaras are also direct and indirect witnesses of the historic events occurring those days, including, among many others, when Antonio, Mercedes, Carlos and Miguel witness the car bombing that kills Prime Minister Luis Carrero Blanco; when Toni chronicles the Portuguese Carnation Revolution from Lisbon; when the whole family queues for hours to see Franco lying in state; when Toni experienced the 23-F coup d'état attempt while inside the Congress building; when Carlos, Karina and Josete get trapped in the Alcalá 20 nightclub fire; when Antonio and Mercedes take part in the famous game show Un, dos, tres... responda otra vez; when the whole family leaves El Descanso restaurant just as it suffers a terrorist attack; when Antonio proudly attends, at the Royal Palace, the solemn signing of the agreement by which Spain and Portugal joined the European Economic Community; when Inés, Marcos and Oriol come out of the Hipercor bombing unscathed; when Toni reports live from Berlin the fall of the Wall; when Toni and his cameraman are kidnapped in Iraq during the Gulf War; when Antonio, Mercedes, Toni and Oriol attend the opening ceremony of the 1992 Summer Olympics; and when the whole family demonstrates against the kidnapping and murder of Miguel Ángel Blanco.

== Cast and characters ==
List indicators

This section includes characters who have appeared in the series as members of the Alcántara family or in more than a hundred episodes as friends or acquaintances.

- An empty grey cell indicates the character was not in the season.
- ^{A} indicates an appearance through archival footage or audio.
- ^{O} indicates an older version of the character.
- ^{U} indicates an uncredited appearance.
- ^{V} indicates a voice-only role.
- ^{Y} indicates a younger version of the character.
- ^{Z} indicates that the character didn't talk and was not seen close-up. The actor or actress served only as a body double.

=== Alcántara Family ===
Character	Portrayed by	Seasons																						
Character	Portrayed by	1	2	3	4	5	6	7	8	9	10	11	12	13	14	15	16	17	18	19	20	21	22	23
Antonio Alcántara Barbadillo	Imanol Arias	Main	Main	Main	Main	Main	Main	Main	Main	Main	Main	Main	Main	Main	Main	Main	Main	Main	Main	Main	Main	Main	Main	Main
Antonio Alcántara Barbadillo	Diego Sáez																		G^{Y}					
Antonio Alcántara Barbadillo	Marcos Sáez																			R^{Y}	G^{Y}			
Antonio Alcántara Barbadillo	Rubén de Eguia																				R^{Y}			
Antonio Alcántara Barbadillo	Daniel Arias																					G^{Y}	R^{Y}	G^{Y}
Mercedes Fernández López	Ana Duato	Main	Main	Main	Main	Main	Main	Main	Main	Main	Main	Main	Main	Main	Main	Main	Main	Main	Main	Main	Main	Main	Main	Main
Mercedes Fernández López	María Bernardeau																		G^{Y}	R^{Y}	G^{Y}	G^{Y}	R^{Y}	G^{Y}
Mercedes Fernández López	Ana del Arco																				R^{Y}			
Mercedes Fernández López	Nuria Carracedo																				G^{Y}			
Mercedes Fernández López	Elsa Quesada																						G^{Y}	
Carlos Alcántara Fernández	Ricardo Gómez	Main	Main	Main	Main	Main	Main	Main	Main	Main	Main	Main	Main	Main	Main	Main	Main	Main	Main	Main				G
Carlos Alcántara Fernández	Carlos Hipólito	Voice^{V} ^{O}	Voice^{V} ^{O}	Voice^{V} ^{O}	Voice^{V} ^{O}	Voice^{V} ^{O}	Voice^{V} ^{O}	Voice^{V} ^{O}	Voice^{V} ^{O}	Voice^{V} ^{O}	Voice^{V} ^{O}	Voice^{V} ^{O}	Voice^{V} ^{O}	Voice^{V} ^{O}	Voice^{V} ^{O}	Voice^{V} ^{O}	Voice^{V} ^{O}	Voice^{V} ^{O}	Voice^{V} ^{O}	Voice^{V} ^{O}	Voice^{V} ^{O}	M^{O}	V^{V} ^{O}	V^{V} ^{O}
Herminia López Vidal	María Galiana	Main	Main	Main	Main	Main	Main	Main	Main	Main	Main	Main	Main	Main	Main	Main	Main	Main	Main	Main	Main	Main	Main	Main
Herminia López Vidal	Paz de Alarcón																			G^{Y}	G^{Y}		R^{Y}	G^{Y}
Antonio Alcántara Fernández ("Toni")	Pablo Rivero	Main	Main	Main	Main	Main	Main	Main	Main	Main	Main	Main	Main	Main	Main	Main	Main	Main	Main	Main	Main	Main	Main	Main
Antonio Alcántara Fernández ("Toni")	Marcos Sáez																				G^{Y}			
Antonio Alcántara Fernández ("Toni")	Enzo Pérez																						G^{Y}	
Inés Alcántara Fernández	Irene Visedo	Main	Main	Main	Main	G	Main	Main	Main									Main	Main	Main	Main	Main	Main	Main
Inés Alcántara Fernández	Pilar Punzano												Main	Main	Main	Main	Main							
Inés Alcántara Fernández	Marieta Orozco										G^{Z}													
Inés Alcántara Fernández	Elena Serrano																				G^{Y}			
Inés Alcántara Fernández	Daniela Fernández																						G^{Y}	
María Alcántara Fernández	Esmeralda García							R	R	M	M													
María Alcántara Fernández	Celine Peña											Recurring	Recurring	Recurring	Recurring									
María Alcántara Fernández	Paula Gallego															Recurring	Recurring	Recurring	M	M	G^{Y}	G^{Y}		
María Alcántara Fernández	Carmen Climent																				Main	Main	Main	Main
María Alcántara Fernández	Silvia Abascal																					R^{O}		
Purificación Barbadillo Sánchez	Terele Pávez		R	R										G										
Miguel Alcántara Barbadillo	Juan Echanove	G						R	R	A	Main	Main	Main	Main	Main	Main	Main	Main	Main					
Miguel Alcántara Barbadillo	Marcos Sáez																		G^{Y}					
Miguel Alcántara Barbadillo	Diego Sáez																			R^{Y}				
Marie Chantal	Anne Marie Rosier	G							G			G				G								
Françoise Alcántara	Patricia Figón	G																						
Françoise Alcántara	Aida Folch										R	R	M	M	G									
Francisca Ramos Fernández ("Paquita")	Ana Arias					Recurring	Recurring	Recurring	Recurring	A	Main	Main	Main	Main	Main	Main	Main	Main	Main	Main	Main		R	R
Diana Alcántara Ramos	Lucía González										Recurring	Recurring	Recurring	Recurring	Recurring	Recurring	Recurring	Recurring	Recurring	Recurring	Recurring			
Diana Alcántara Ramos	Teresa Pérez																						R	G
Eugenio Domingo Subirats	Pere Ponce	R	R	Also starring	Also starring	Also starring	Also starring	Also starring	Also starring	R			G			G								
Antonio Oriol Domingo Alcántara	Hugo Várgues												R											
Antonio Oriol Domingo Alcántara	Javier Lorenzo													Recurring	Recurring	Recurring	Recurring	Recurring	Recurring	Recurring	Recurring	Recurring		
Antonio Oriol Domingo Alcántara	Borja Fano																					R^{O}		
Antonio Oriol Domingo Alcántara	Álvaro Díaz																						R	R
Juana Andrade	Cristina Alcázar								Recurring	Recurring	Recurring	M	G	G	R				Recurring	Recurring	Recurring	Recurring	Recurring	
Santiago Alcántara Andrade	Víctor Garrido													Recurring	Recurring	Recurring	Recurring	Recurring	Recurring	Recurring	Recurring	Recurring		
Santiago Alcántara Andrade	Jan Cornet																					R^{O}		
Santiago Alcántara Andrade	Asier Valdestilla																						R	R
Deborah Stern	Paloma Bloyd																		R	Main	Main	Main	Main	Main
Sol Alcántara Stern	Carlota																					R^{U}	R^{U}	
Sol Alcántara Stern	Sofía Otero																							G
María Caridad Saavedra Martín ("Karina")	Elena Rivera							Recurring	Recurring	Recurring	Recurring	M	M	Recurring	Recurring	Recurring	Recurring	Recurring	Recurring	M				G
María Caridad Saavedra Martín ("Karina")	Rosana Pastor																					G^{O}		
Mike	William Miller	R			R													G		Recurring	Recurring	Recurring	Recurring	Recurring
Marcos García de Blas	Carlos Cuevas																		R	M	R			
Jorge Casado	Carlos Serrano-Clark																					Recurring	Recurring	Recurring
Jorge Casado	Martxelo Rubio																					R^{O}		
Alba Casado Alcántara	Paula Morago																					R^{O}		

=== Friends and acquaintances ===
Character	Portrayed by	Seasons																						
Character	Portrayed by	1	2	3	4	5	6	7	8	9	10	11	12	13	14	15	16	17	18	19	20	21	22	23
José Quijo Jiménez ("Josete")	Santiago Crespo	Recurring	Recurring	Recurring	Recurring	Recurring	Recurring	Recurring	Recurring	Recurring	Main	Main	Main	Main	Recurring	Recurring	Recurring	Recurring	Recurring	Recurring	Recurring	Recurring		G
Ramón Pascual Bustamante	Manolo Cal	Recurring	Recurring	Recurring	Recurring	Recurring	Recurring	Recurring	Recurring	A	Main	Main	Main	Main	Recurring	Recurring	Recurring	Recurring	Recurring	Recurring	Recurring	Recurring	Recurring	Recurring
María del Pilar Villuendas García ("Pili")	Lluvia Rojo	Recurring	Recurring	Recurring	Recurring	Recurring	Recurring	Recurring	Recurring	A	Main	Main	Main	Main	Recurring	Recurring	Recurring	Recurring	Recurring					
Desiderio Quijo ("Desi")	Roberto Cairo	Recurring	Recurring	Recurring	Recurring	Recurring	Recurring	Also starring	Also starring	Also starring	Main	Main	Main	Main	R	R								G^{A}
Clara Jiménez	Silvia Espigado	R	G	Recurring	Recurring	Recurring	Recurring	Recurring	Recurring	Recurring	Main	Main	Main	Main	Recurring	Recurring	Recurring	Recurring	Recurring	Recurring	Recurring	Recurring	Recurring	Recurring
Valentina Rojas	Alicia Hermida	Also starring	Also starring	Also starring	Also starring	Also starring	Also starring	Also starring	Also starring	Also starring	M	M	G		G									G^{A}
Luis Gómez Bermúdez	Manuel Dios	Recurring	Recurring	Recurring	Recurring	Recurring	Recurring	Recurring	Recurring	Recurring		G	G		G		Recurring	Recurring	Recurring	Recurring	G	Recurring	Recurring	Recurring
Froilán Cardeñosa Mora	Antonio Canal	G				Recurring	Recurring	Recurring	Recurring	Recurring	Recurring	Main	Main	Main	Recurring	Recurring	Recurring	Recurring	Recurring	Recurring	G			G^{A}
Pablo Ramírez Sañudo	José Sancho	A	Main	Main	Main	Main	Main	Main	Main	Main	Main													
Celestino Álvarez ("Tinín")	Enrique San Francisco	Also starring	Also starring	Also starring	Also starring	Also starring	Also starring	Also starring	Also starring	Also starring														
Josefa García Peláez ("Josefina")	Pepa Sarsa	G	G	Recurring	Recurring	Recurring	Recurring	Recurring	Recurring	Recurring	Recurring	Recurring	Recurring	Recurring	Recurring	Recurring	Recurring	Recurring	Recurring	Recurring	Recurring	Guest	Guest	Guest
Eladio Contreras Prieto ("Cervan")	Tony Leblanc	Also starring	Also starring	Also starring	Also starring	Also starring	Also starring	Also starring	Also starring	Also starring	M													G^{A}
Nieves Carranza	Rosario Pardo	Also starring	Also starring	Also starring	Also starring	Also starring	Also starring							G			Recurring	Recurring	Recurring	Recurring				

More than three thousand other performers have appeared in the series. Many established actors, or who had a breakout role later, have had recurring or guest roles throughout the series, including Susana Abaitua, María José Alfonso, Anna Allen, Héctor Alterio, Javier Ambrossi, Ángel de Andrés López, Álex Angulo, Enrique Arce, Raúl Arévalo, Carmen Balagué, Elena Ballesteros, Carlos Bardem, Pilar Bardem, Miguel Bernardeau, Icíar Bollaín, María Botto, Pedro Casablanc, César Camino, Carles Canut, Óscar Casas, Pilar Castro, Víctor Clavijo, Adrià Collado, Luis Cuenca, Gemma Cuervo, Juan Díaz, Ruth Díaz, Israel Elejalde, Asier Etxeandia, Fiorella Faltoyano, Fernando Fernán Gómez, Greta Fernández, Alba Flores, Nacho Fresneda, Elena Furiase, Ginés García Millán, Andrés Gertrúdix, Ariadna Gil, Daniel Giménez Cacho, Aizpea Goenaga, Bárbara Goenaga, Agustín González, Fernando Guillén, Carlos Iglesias, Itziar Ituño, Chete Lera, José Lifante, Charo López, José Luis López Vázquez, Mikel Losada, Manuel Manquiña, Kiti Mánver, Cristina Marcos, Juan Margallo, Sílvia Marsó, Julia Martínez, Maria de Medeiros, Melody, Natalia Millán, Juli Mira, Irene Montalà, Guillermo Montesinos, Álvaro Morte, Sergio Mur, Marta Nieto, Nancho Novo, Francesc Orella, Antonio Pagudo, Mario Pardo, Diana Peñalver, Javier Pereira, Blanca Portillo, Brendan Price, Juanjo Puigcorbé, Jordi Rebellón, Miguel Rellán, Antonio Resines, Mabel Rivera, Paco Sagarzazu, Susi Sánchez, Bárbara Santa-Cruz, Carlos Santos, Alejo Sauras, Julieta Serrano, Manolo Solo, Emma Suárez, Adriana Torrebejano, Claudia Traisac, Unax Ugalde, Antonio Valero, Manuela Velasco, Pastora Vega, Juan Carlos Vellido and Luis Zahera.

In addition to the fictional characters, many well-known real characters of the time have also appeared in the series with the use of different techniques, from the insertion of footage from Televisión Española archive with CGI techniques to the use of actors to play them. The only three people who have played their thirty years younger selves have been politician Santiago Carrillo, film director Fernando Colomo and musician Ariel Rot.

== Episodes ==
Season	Episodes		Originally released		Avg. viewers (millions)	Avg. share (Note: "Share" meaning the percentage of people who watched the episode among the people who were watching television at that same time.)	Setting	R.
Season	Episodes		First released	Last released	Avg. viewers (millions)	Avg. share	Setting	R.
1	33		13 September 2001	4 July 2002	5.519	33.7%	2 April 1968 – 3 August 1969	
2	14		26 September 2002	26 December 2002	6.419	37.6%	15 August 1969 – 1 January 1970	
3	13		3 April 2003	10 July 2003	6.746	42.0%	31 March 1970 – 21 July 1970	
4	14		25 September 2003	1 January 2004	6.727	39.0%	8 September 1970 – 1 January 1971	
5	13		15 April 2004	22 July 2004	5.788	35.3%	10 May 1971 – 12 July 1971	
6	14		18 November 2004	24 February 2005	5.830	32.5%	27 October 1972 – 18 March 1973	
7	17		22 September 2005	12 January 2006	4.969	28.2%	23 September 1973 – 6 January 1974	
8	21		14 September 2006	8 February 2007	4.746	26.7%	25 April 1974 – 12 March 1975	
9	22		13 September 2007	14 February 2008	3.746	21.0%	30 April 1975 – 7 February 1976	
10	19		28 August 2008	25 December 2008	4.281	24.1%	16 April 1976 – 1 January 1977	
11	16		3 September 2009	17 December 2009	4.074	22.2%	12 March 1977 – 26 December 1977	
12	18		11 November 2010	17 March 2011	4.724	23.8%	7 June 1978 – 31 May 1979	
13	18		15 September 2011	2 February 2012	4.547	22.7%	30 August 1979 – 11 February 1981	
14	20		3 January 2013	23 May 2013	4.101	20.5%	23 February 1981 – February 1982	
15	19		16 January 2014	5 June 2014	3.758	18.5%	2 July 1982 – 8 March 1983	
16	19		8 January 2015	21 May 2015	3.125	16.1%	5 April 1983 – 21 December 1983	
17	19		7 January 2016	19 May 2016	3.209	17.2%	5 January 1984 – 16 March 1985	
18	19		12 January 2017	25 May 2017	2.928	17.1%	11 April 1985 – 20 October 1986	
19	19	9	25 January 2018	22 March 2018	2.968	18.0%	18 January 1987 – 19 June 1987	
19	19	10	13 September 2018	29 November 2018	2.341	15.5%	June 1987 – 13 September 1988	
20	21	10	21 March 2019	30 May 2019	2.211	14.2%	30 October 1988 – 6 March 1990	
20	21	11	2 January 2020	19 March 2020	2.189	14.4%	22 December 1990 – September 1991	
21	19		14 January 2021	27 May 2021	1.695	10.0%	7 February 1992 – 15 September 1993; March 2020 – Spring 2022	
22	18		20 January 2022	16 June 2022	1.208	9.3%	September 1993 – July 1994	
23	7		18 October 2023	29 November 2023	1.405	13.2%	30 December 1994 – 20 September 2001	

A total of 413 numbered episodes were broadcast over twenty-three seasons. Episodes 182 and 183 were originally edited as a double episode and broadcast as one. The series has also nine additional unnumbered special episodes not counted in the official episodes numeration. Season three, season twenty and season twenty-two finish, season seven, season eight and the second part of season nineteen start and season twenty-one and season twenty-two rest mid-season with one of those unnumbered special episodes each. An additional farewell reunion special featuring the main cast preceded the broadcast of the final episode.

== Release ==
Cuéntame cómo pasó episodes premiered on La 1 of Televisión Española in prime time on Thursdays for the first twenty-two seasons and on Wednesdays for season twenty-three. (Note: Except for episodes 82 and 205 which aired on Friday and episode 271 which aired on Monday.) They were also broadcast by TVE Internacional in its different international feeds around the world and online on RTVE a la carta (2008–21) and RTVE Play (2021–23). In addition to RTVE Play, since 2019 all episodes are also available on demand in Amazon Prime Video, with each new episode available the day after its premiere on TVE. Subsequently, the series was distributed in more than fifteen countries including Argentina, Austria, Finland, Mexico, Panama, Puerto Rico, and Uruguay.

Seasons of the show and multi-season sets in book form were released on DVD in Spain by Divisa Home Video.

== Reception ==
=== Critical reception ===
Cuéntame cómo pasó has received critical acclaim throughout most of its run with much of the praise reserved for the cast and their performances, the script and its dialogues, and the setting and its fidelity to the period. It was also praised its ability to reinvent and modernize itself narratively and aesthetically in every season, and its courage to deal with difficult topics from very interesting perspectives. Some critics and publications have called the series the best Spanish series of all time. Although with such a long run the series has had some ups and downs with plot lines that have been controversial.

=== Spanish television ratings ===
Season one premiered in Spain attracting an average of 5.519 million viewers and 33.7% share per episode. Viewing figures increased in seasons two up to 6.419 millions and 37.6% share in average, and season three up to 6.746 millions and 42.0% share. It reached its maximum in the last episode of season three with 7.253 millions and 51.0% share in average, with peaks of nearly ten millions. After remaining stable in season four with 6.727 million and 39.0% share, viewing figures decreased gradually until reaching a minimum in season nine with 3.746 million and 21.0% share. It recovered until reaching 4.724 million and 23.8% share in season twelve, after which figures gradually decreased significantly due to the increase in the number of channels on DTT and the arrival of streaming services, which led to a fragmentation of the market, and the change in television consumption habits. Despite this, it has managed to be the most watched fiction series on Televisión Española, far above other shows on the network, as well as the leader in its time-slot, for most of its run.

=== Awards and honors ===
It received numerous national and international awards, including the first National Television Award awarded by the Spanish Ministry of Culture in 2009, two Premios Ondas (the International Television Award in 2002 and for Best National Television Series in 2003), three New York Latin ACE Awards –for Best Scenic Program in Television in 2008 and Special Awards for Imanol Arias in 2009 and Ana Duato in 2010–, a Silver Bird Prize in the Seoul International Drama Awards as the runner-up for Best Drama Series in 2007, a Silver Remi in the WorldFest-Houston International Film Festival in the category of Best Television Comedy Series in 2010, and two Antena de Oro for Best Fiction in 2003 and 2014. It received thirty-six Awards of the Spanish Television Academy out of ninety-six nominations, including the award for Best Fiction Show in 2002, 2003, 2007, 2008, 2009, and 2011. It was also nominated for the International Emmy Award for Best Drama Series in 2003. The season twenty promo received a silver prize in the EBU Connect Awards as the runner-up for Best Fictional Promotion in 2020. The series, its cast and its technical crew have received more than a hundred awards overall.

== Legacy ==
=== International versions ===
The series has been adapted in 2006 in Italy by RAI as Raccontami starring Massimo Ghini and Lunetta Savino, in 2007 in Portugal by RTP as Conta-me como foi with Miguel Guilherme and Rita Blanco, in 2017 in Argentina by Televisión Pública Argentina as Cuéntame cómo pasó with Nicolás Cabré and Malena Solda and in 2020 in Greece by ERT as Ta Kalytera mas Chronia with Meletis Elias and Katerina Papoutsaki. The format was also sold to other countries, such as the United States, Mexico, and Bulgaria, but no such adaptations were ultimately made.

=== In other media ===
In 2010, an attempt was made to create a stage musical directed by Jaime Chávarri based on the series, for which TVE and Grupo Ganga developed a talent show called Cántame cómo pasó (transl. Sing me how it happened) to find the female performer who would play the character of Mercedes and the artist who would play either the role of grandmother Herminia, or that of one of the three Alcántara children: Inés, Toni or Carlos. Thirteen artists competed for Mercedes, four for Herminia, and another three for each of the children. The show was hosted by Anne Igartiburu, had Daniel Diges and Lluvia Rojo as advisors, and Eduardo Ladrón de Guevara and Chávarri himself as judges. After its premiere on 7 May, it had to shorten its run and bring forward its final to 4 June due to the notable loss of audience. The winners were Selina as Mercedes and Itxaso Quintana as Inés. After this, the musical was never made.

On 27 July 2012, a short clip from the series' first episode was shown at the 2012 Summer Olympics opening ceremony in London among clips of famous British television programmes, music videos and films as part of "Frankie and June say...thanks Tim" sequence.

On 14 May 2015, Jacobo Delgado and Carlos Molinero, two scriptwriters of the series, published the novel Toda una vida that goes back in time to narrate the origin of the love story between Antonio and Mercedes. The series itself, which continued many years after the publication of the novel, does not follow what is narrated in it and even contradicts it.
