= Raccontami =

- Based on: Cuéntame cómo pasó
- Starring: Massimo Ghini; Lunetta Savino; Mariolina De Fano; Edoardo Natoli; Carlotta Tesconi; Gianluca Grecchi
- Narrated by: Roberto Chevalier
- Country of origin: Italy
- Original language: Italian
- No. of seasons: 2
- No. of episodes: 52

Production
- Production company: Rai Fiction

Original release
- Network: Rai 1
- Release: 10 December 2006 – 4 December 2008

Raccontami is an Italian television drama series that was broadcast on Rai 1 from 2006 to 2008. It recounts the experiences of a middle-class family, the Ferrucci, from 1960 to 1966.

== Development ==
The series is an adaptation of Cuéntame cómo pasó, a Spanish series by Televisión Española starring Imanol Arias and Ana Duato. It has also been adapted in Portugal by RTP as Conta-me como foi with Miguel Guilherme and Rita Blanco, in Argentina by Televisión Pública Argentina as Cuéntame cómo pasó with Nicolás Cabré and Malena Solda and in Greece by ERT as Ta Kalytera mas Chronia with Meletis Elias and Katerina Papoutsaki.

There was a third season initially confirmed but later cancelled. This third season would recount the Ferrucci story from 1967 to 1970.

== Cast and characters ==
List indicators

This section includes characters who have appeared in the series as the main cast.

- An empty grey cell indicates the character was not in the season.
- ^{O} indicates an older version of the character.
- ^{V} indicates a voice-only role.

=== Ferrucci Family ===
Character	Portrayed by	Seasons	
Character	Portrayed by	1	2
Luciano Ferrucci	Massimo Ghini	Main	Main
Elena Sorrentino	Lunetta Savino	Main	Main
Innocenza Sorrentino	Mariolina De Fano	Main	Main
Andrea Ferrucci	Edoardo Natoli	Main	Main
Elisabetta Ferrucci ("Titti")	Carlotta Tesconi	Main	Main
Carlo Ferrucci	Gianluca Grecchi	Main	Main
Carlo Ferrucci	Roberto Chevalier	Voice^{V} ^{O}	Voice^{V} ^{O}

== Episodes ==
Season	Episodes	Originally released		Setting
Season	Episodes	First released	Last released	Setting
1	26	10 December 2006	15 February 2007	1960 – 1963
2	26	12 October 2008	4 December 2008	1964 – 1966

== See also ==
- List of Italian television series
