= Cuéntame cómo pasó (Argentine TV series) =

2017 Argentine television series

- Genre: Historical comedy drama
- Based on: Cuéntame cómo pasó
- Starring: Nicolás Cabré; Malena Solda; Leonor Manso; Candela Vetrano; Franco Masini
- Narrated by: Martín Seefeld
- Country of origin: Argentina
- Original language: Spanish
- No. of seasons: 1
- No. of episodes: 71

Production
- Production location: Buenos Aires
- Production company: Televisión Pública Argentina

Original release
- Release: 21 August – 21 December 2017

Cuéntame cómo pasó (transl. 'Tell me how it happened') is an Argentine television series broadcast by Televisión Pública Argentina. The series premiered on 21 August 2017, and ended on 21 December 2017.

== Development ==
The series is an adaptation of Cuéntame cómo pasó, a Spanish series by Televisión Española starring Imanol Arias and Ana Duato. It has also been adapted in Portugal by RTP as Conta-me como foi with Miguel Guilherme and Rita Blanco, in Italy by RAI as Raccontami with Massimo Ghini and Lunetta Savino and in Greece by ERT as Ta Kalytera mas Chronia with Meletis Elias and Katerina Papoutsaki.

The series was broadcast in prime-time from Monday to Thursday and interspersed the most important historical facts of Argentina with the comings and goings of a family settled in the suburbs of Buenos Aires. The narration mixed documentary images from the historical archive of the channel with scenes performed by the actors, between 1974 and 1983.

Every Friday, a special episode titled Cuéntame un poco más (transl. Tell me a bit more) conducted by Teté Coustarot was aired and in which the most outstanding scenes of the week were reviewed, along with a discussion of their historical context.

== Cast and characters ==
List indicators

This section includes characters who have appeared in the series as the main cast.

- An empty grey cell indicates the character was not in the season.
- ^{O} indicates an older version of the character.
- ^{V} indicates a voice-only role.

=== Martínez Family ===
Character	Portrayed by	Seasons	
Character	Portrayed by	1	
Antonio Martínez	Nicolás Cabré	Main	Main
Mercedes Pérez Torres ("Mecha")	Malena Solda	Main	Main
Herminia Torres	Leonor Manso	Main	Main
Inés Martínez Pérez	Candela Vetrano	Main	Main
Antonio Martínez Pérez ("Toni")	Franco Masini	Main	Main
Carlos Martínez Pérez	Luca Ciatti	Main	
Carlos Martínez Pérez	Gonzalo Slipak		Main
Carlos Martínez Pérez	Martín Seefeld	Voice^{V} ^{O}	Voice^{V} ^{O}

== Episodes ==
Season	Episodes	Originally released		Setting
Season	Episodes	First released	Last released	Setting
1	71	21 August 2017	21 December 2017	1 July 1974 – 10 December 1983

== Promotion ==
The first promo was launched on 26 July 2017. On 14 August 2017, it made its presentation at the CCK.
