= Suburbs (film) =

- Theatrical release poster
- Spanish: Adosados
- Directed by: Mario Camus
- Screenplay by: Félix Bayón; Mario Camus
- Based on: Adosados by Félix Bayón
- Produced by: Enrique Cerezo
- Starring: Antonio Valero; Ana Duato; Jaume Valls; Lluís Homar; Boris Nevzorov
- Cinematography: Jaume Peracaula
- Edited by: José Mª Biurrun
- Music by: Sebastián Mariné
- Production company: Enrique Cerezo PC
- Distributed by: Lider Films
- Release date: 9 August 1996
- Country: Spain
- Language: Spanish

Suburbs (Spanish: Adosados) is a 1996 Spanish drama film directed by Mario Camus based on the novel by Félix Bayón which stars Antonio Valero, Ana Duato, Jaume Valls, Lluís Homar, and Boris Nevzorov.

== Plot ==
A visit to the veterinarian triggers a series of lies that jeopardizes the routine and peaceful suburban life of a successful auditor with his wife and children.

== Cast ==
- Antonio Valero as Andrés
- Ana Duato as Paula
- Jaume Valls as veterinario ('veterinarian')
- Lluís Homar as hombre de Paula ('Paula's man')
- Boris Nevzorov as Yuri
- Simón Andreu as jefe de Andrés
- Ramón Langa as comisario
- Ángel Jodrá as Gordo
- Paco Plaza

== Production ==
The film was produced by Enrique Cerezo PC.

== Release ==
Suburbs was released theatrically in Spain on 9 August 1996. It also screened at the Montreal Film Festival later in August that year.

== Reception ==
Godfrey Cheshire of Variety billed the film as an "awitty, downbeat allegory of middle-class fears".

== Accolades ==
Year	Award	Category	Nominee(s)	Result	Ref.
1996	20th Montreal World Film Festival	Best Screenplay	Mario Camus, Félix Bayón	Won	

== Themes ==
The films has been studied within the scope of an examination of the "culture of the townhouse" as a "control device by the Spanish democratic governments in the 1990s through the urban restructuring of the suburbs of large cities".

== See also ==
- List of Spanish films of 1996
