= Lluvia Rojo =

Spanish actress and singer

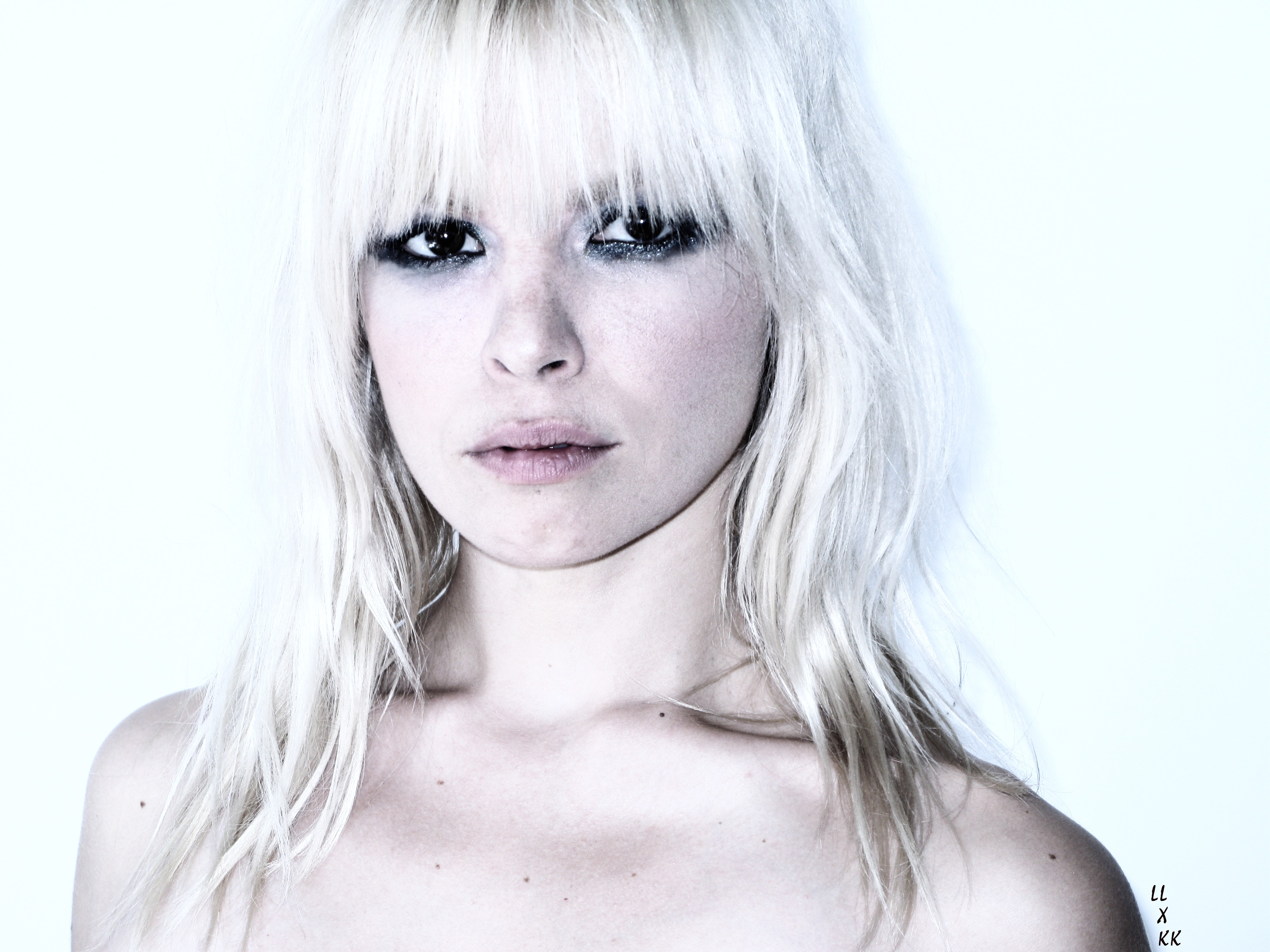
- Born: Lluvia Rojo Moro; 6 November 1976 (age 49); Madrid, Spain
- Occupations: Singer, actress

Lluvia Rojo Moro (born 6 November 1976 in Madrid) is a Spanish actress and singer.

She studied translation and interpretation (English and German) in Madrid, New York City and Berlin. She also studied drama at the Jorge Eínes' Atelier. She is also a member of the hard-pop band No Band For Lluvia (Subterfuge Records), along with Kevin Kajetzke, Darío Lofish, and Lyndon Parish .

== Filmography ==
- Íntimos y extraños, (2008), by Rubén Alonso
- Crónicas de la Vieja República (fanfilm)
- El síndrome de Svensson (2006), by Kepa Sojo
- Pobre juventud (2006), by Miguel Jiménez
- El Calentito (2005), by Chus Gutiérrez
- Alianza mortal (2002), by Rico brothers
- Barrio (1998), by Fernando León de Aranoa

=== Short films ===
- Paco, (2009), by Jorge Roelas
- The Old Man in the Sea (2006), by Enrique Rodríguez. University of Navarre
- Ricardo, piezas descatalogadas (2005), by Rico brothers
- Las superamigas contra el profesor Vinilo (2003), by Domingo González

== Television ==
=== As a conductor ===
- Los 40 principales (1997–1998)
- + Música (Canal satélite digital) (1997–1998)

=== As an actress ===
- Cuéntame cómo pasó (2000–2011)
- Paraíso (2000)
- Hospital Central (1998)
- Ellas son así (1998)
- A las once en casa (1998)

== Theatre ==
- Don Juan, el burlador de Sevilla (2008–2009), by Tirso de Molina
- Aquí no paga nadie, by Darío Fo (2004–2005).

=== Radiotheatre ===
- Psicosis (2010)

== Awards ==
- Ercilla de Teatro Award, 2008. Best New Actress for Don Juan, el burlador de Sevilla.
- Fundación Lumière: Premio "solidario a las artes escénicas" 2006
- Unión de Actores 2007 and 2004 nominations for best actress in a supporting role.
