= Free the Fish =

- Directed by: Cristina Comencini
- Starring: Laura Morante
- Cinematography: Roberto Forza
- Edited by: Jacopo Quadri
- Release date: 2000
- Language: Italian

Free the Fish (Italian: Liberate i pesci!) is a 2000 Italian comedy film directed by Cristina Comencini. The film was nominated to three Nastro d'Argento awards.

== Cast ==
- Laura Morante: Mara
- Michele Placido: Michele Verrio
- Francesco Paolantoni: Sergio
- Emilio Solfrizzi: Emilio
- Lunetta Savino: Lunetta
