= Miguel Bernardeau =

Spanish actor (born 1996)

- Bernardeau at the 2026 Toronto International Film Festival
- Born: Miguel Ángel Bernardeau Duato; 12 December 1996 (age 29); Valencia, Spain
- Education: Santa Monica College; American Academy of Dramatic Arts
- Occupation: Actor
- Years active: 2016–present
- Mother: Ana Duato
- Relatives: Joaquín Duato (uncle); Nacho Duato (second uncle)

Miguel Ángel Bernardeau Duato (born 12 December 1996) is a Spanish actor.

== Biography ==
Miguel Ángel Bernardeau Duato was born on 12 December 1996 in Valencia, Spain. He is the son of television producer Miguel Ángel Bernardeau and actress Ana Duato. He has a younger sister, María, who has also pursued an acting career. He studied Dramatic Art in the United States, at Santa Monica College and acting at the American Academy of Dramatic Arts in Los Angeles, California. He made his feature film debut in the comedy It's for Your Own Good (2017).

== Personal life ==
In 2018, Miguel Bernardeau started a relationship with singer Aitana, which they confirmed in August 2019. They lived together from September 2021 to December 2022, when Bernardeau reportedly moved out upon breaking up with Aitana.

== Filmography ==
=== Television ===
Year	Title	Role	Network	Notes
2016	Cuéntame cómo pasó	Alpuente	La 1	1 episode
2017	Inhibidos	Antonio "Toni" Torres Zapata	Playz	7 episodes
2018	Sabuesos	Isaac	La 1	8 episodes
2018–2021	Elite	Guzmán Nunier Osuna	Netflix	Main role (seasons 1-4); 32 episodes
2020	Caronte	Javier Sáez Fragua	Cuatro / Amazon Prime Video	1 episode
2021	Élite: historias breves	Guzmán Nunier Osuna	Netflix	6 episodes
2021	Todo lo otro	Iñaki	HBO Max	8 episodes
2021	Playa Negra	Hugo		Main role; 8 episodes
2022	1899	Angel	Netflix	Main role
2022	La última (Our Only Chance)	Diego Ulloa	Disney+	Main role; 5 episodes
2024	Zorro	Diego de la Vega / El Zorro	Amazon Prime Video	Main role
2024	Querer	Aitor Gorosmendi	Movistar Plus+	Main role; 4 episodes
2025	Terra Alta	Melchor Marín	Movistar Plus+	Main role; 6 episodes

=== Film ===
Key
†	Denotes films that have not yet been released

Year	Title	Role	Ref.
2017	It's for Your Own Good	Daniel "Dani" Castro	
2018	Crime Wave	Julen	
2021	Josephine	Sergio López Mirador	
2024	Spellbound	Chilo (voice)	
2026	La fiera (To the Max)	Armando del Rey	
2026	La bola negra	Rafael Rodríguez Rapún	
TBA	Una cabeza en la pared † (Head on the Wall)		

== Awards and nominations ==
Year	Award	Category	Work	Result	Ref.
2025	12th Feroz Awards	Best Supporting Actor in a Series	Querer	Nominated	
2025	33rd Actors and Actresses Union Awards	Best Television Actor in a Secondary Role	Querer	Nominated	
2026	27th Iris Awards	Best Actor	Querer	Nominated	
