= Roberto Chevalier =

Italian actor and voice actor (born 1952)

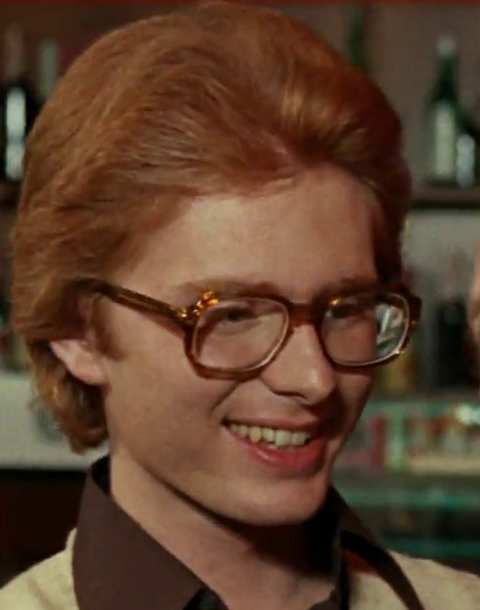
- Chevalier in Don't Hurt Me, My Love (1974)
- Born: Roberto Chevalier Di Miceli; 14 May 1952 (age 74); Rome, Italy
- Occupations: Actor; voice actor; dubbing director
- Years active: 1958–present
- Children: 3, including David Chevalier

Roberto Chevalier Di Miceli (born 14 May 1952) is an Italian actor and voice actor who is best known for providing the Italian voice of Tom Cruise in most of his movies.

== Biography ==
Born in Rome, Chevalier entered his profession as a child actor in the late 1950s and he made his debut acting appearance in the 1958 film Young Husbands. He also reached stardom with his appearances in the 1961 film The Vengeance of Ursus and the 1963 film I terribili 7. Additionally, he portrayed a young David Copperfield in the 1965 television miniseries of the same name. Chevalier also spent five years in Teatro Ghione collaborating with Giorgio Strehler. However, he left due to his father’s death and his mother’s diagnosis with cancer. He continued acting as an adult as he began accepting minor or recurring roles on television by the beginning of the 21st century.

Chevalier is best known as a voice actor. He is best known as the official Italian voice of Tom Cruise and has dubbed him in most of his work since the 1986 film Top Gun. He is also a regular dub actor of Tom Hanks, Andy García, Dennis Quaid, John Travolta and Kurt Russell. Additionally, he has also dubbed Tony Goldwyn, Michael Keaton, James Woods, David Bowie, Christopher Reeve, Jeff Daniels, Michael Biehn as well as dubbing Owen Wilson in his earlier movies.

Some of Chevalier’s character dubbing roles include Cruise's role of Ethan Hunt in the Mission: Impossible franchise (excluding the third film as Cruise is dubbed by Riccardo Rossi), as well as Truman Capote (portrayed by Philip Seymour Hoffman) in the 2006 film Capote, Ian Malcolm (portrayed by Jeff Goldblum) in the 1993 film Jurassic Park and Hal (portrayed by Bryan Cranston) in the sitcom Malcolm in the Middle. In Chevalier’s animated roles, he voiced Lucky in the Italian version of One Hundred and One Dalmatians early in his dubbing career, as well as Vicious in the anime series Cowboy Bebop.

=== Personal life ===
Chevalier is the father of the voice actor David Chevalier. His daughters, Arlena and Fiore are also voice dubbers.

== Filmography ==
=== Cinema ===
Year	Title	Role	Notes
1958	Young Husbands	Checchino	
1958	The Naked Maja	The Little Prince	
1959	My Wife's Enemy	Little Boy at Terenzi's	Uncredited
1960	Rapina al quartiere Ovest		
1961	The Vengeance of Ursus	Dario	
1961	Pulcinella, cetrulo di Acerra	Il ragazzo	
1961	Scandali al mare	Charlie	
1963	I terribili 7	Fantomas	
1970	A Girl Called Jules	Camillo	
1970	Una prostituta al servizio del pubblico e in regola con le leggi dello stato		
1974	Don't Hurt Me, My Love	Marcello Foschini	
1975	Son tornate a fiorire le rose	Marcello Foschini	
1976	For Love of Cesarina	Paolino Mariani	

=== Television ===
Year	Title	Role	Notes
1959	Il romanzo di un maestro		TV miniseries
1963	La cocuzza		TV film
1964	Il giornalino di Gian Burrasca	Luigi "Gigino" Balestra	TV miniseries
1965	Il vecchio e il faro	Giulio	TV miniseries
1965	David Copperfield	David Copperfield (young)	TV miniseries
1967	I racconti del faro	Giulio	TV miniseries
1971	E le stelle stanno a guardare	Pat Reedy	TV miniseries
1975	I killer	Nick	TV film
2000	Padre Pio: Miracle Man	Giuseppe	TV miniseries
2000	The Wings of Life	Giuseppe	TV miniseries
2002	Distretto di Polizia	Germana's father	Recurring role (season 3)
2004	Un medico in famiglia		2 episodes (season 4)
2011	R.I.S. Roma – Delitti imperfetti	Siniscalchi	1 episode (season 2x10)
2011	Che Dio ci aiuti	collaboratore di Elvira Casalgrande	1 episode (season 1x05)
2018	Il confine	Salandra	TV miniseries

== Voice work ==
Year	Title	Role	Notes
2006–2008	Raccontami	Narrator	Voice-over

=== Dubbing ===
==== Films (Animation, Italian dub) ====
Year	Title	Role(s)	Ref
1961	One Hundred and One Dalmatians	Lucky	
1968	Bambi	Adult Bambi (1968 redub)	
1981	American Pop	Tony Belinsky	
1998	The Secret of NIMH 2: Timmy to the Rescue	Narrator	
1998	Tekken: The Motion Picture	Lei Wulong	
1999	South Park: Bigger, Longer & Uncut	Dr. Gouache	
2001	Final Fantasy: The Spirits Within	General Hein	
2003	La légende de Parva	Professor Hesse	
2004	Steamboy	David	
2013	Dragon Ball Z: Battle of Gods	Whis	
2015	Dragon Ball Z: Resurrection 'F'	Whis	
2017	The Star	Zachariah	

==== Films (Live action, Italian dub) ====
Year	Title	Role(s)	Original actor	Ref
1974	The Front Page	Rudy Keppler	Jon Korkes	
1976	The Man Who Fell to Earth	Thomas Jerome Newton	David Bowie	
1980	Somewhere in Time	Richard Collier	Christopher Reeve	
1980	Inferno	Mark Elliott	Leigh McCloskey	
1982	Missing	Frank Teruggi	Joe Regalbuto	
1983	Silkwood	Drew Stephens	Kurt Russell	
1985	Volunteers	Lawrence Bourne III	Tom Hanks	
1985	Back to the Future	Dave McFly	Marc McClure	
1985	Perfect	Adam Lawrence	John Travolta	
1985	Plenty	Mick	Sting	
1985	Nothing Underneath	Bob Crane	Tom Schanley	
1985	Phenomena	Kurt	Michele Soavi	
1986	Top Gun	Pete "Maverick" Mitchell	Tom Cruise	
1986	Friday the 13th Part VI: Jason Lives	Darren Robinson	Tony Goldwyn	
1986	Labyrinth	Jareth	David Bowie	
1986	Heat	Danny DeMarco	Neill Barry	
1987	Suspect	Eddie Sanger	Dennis Quaid	
1987	Innerspace	Lieutenant Tuck Pendleton	Dennis Quaid	
1987	Gaby: A True Story	David	Tony Goldwyn	
1988	Switching Channels	Blaine Bingham	Christopher Reeve	
1988	Rain Man	Charlie Babbitt	Tom Cruise	
1988	D.O.A.	Professor Dexter Cornell	Dennis Quaid	
1988	Punchline	Steven Gold	Tom Hanks	
1988	The Presidio	Jay Austin	Mark Harmon	
1989	Born on the Fourth of July	Ron Kovic	Tom Cruise	
1989	Tango & Cash	Gabriel Cash	Kurt Russell	
1989	Weekend at Bernie's	Richard Parker	Jonathan Silverman	
1989	Look Who's Talking	James Ubriacco	John Travolta	
1989	The Experts	Travis	John Travolta	
1989	True Believer	Eddie Dodd	James Woods	
1989	The 'Burbs	Ray Peterson	Tom Hanks	
1989	The Tall Guy	Dexter King	Jeff Goldblum	
1990	Postcards from the Edge	Jack Faulkner	Dennis Quaid	
1990	Sibling Rivalry	Nicholas Meany	Bill Pullman	
1990	Look Who's Talking Too	James Ubriacco	John Travolta	
1990	Days of Thunder	Cole Trickle	Tom Cruise	
1990	Navy SEALs	Lieutenant James Curran	Michael Biehn	
1990	The Bonfire of the Vanities	Sherman McCoy	Tom Hanks	
1990	The Godfather Part III	Vincent Corleone	Andy García	
1990	Pretty Woman	David Morse	Alex Hyde-White	
1990	Arachnophobia	Dr. Ross Jennings	Jeff Daniels	
1991	The Hard Way	Lieutenant John Moss	James Woods	
1991	Eyes of an Angel	Bobby	John Travolta	
1991	Shout	Jack Cabe	John Travolta	
1991	Backdraft	Brian McCaffrey	William Baldwin	
1992	Radio Flyer	Older Mike Marshall	Tom Hanks	
1992	A League of Their Own	Jimmy Dugan	Tom Hanks	
1992	Kuffs	Ted Bukovsky	Tony Goldwyn	
1992	Split Second	Dick Durkin	Alastair Duncan	
1992	Far and Away	Joseph Donnelly	Tom Cruise	
1992	A Few Good Men	Daniel Kaffee	Tom Cruise	
1992	Nervous Ticks	York Daley	Bill Pullman	
1992	Hero	John Bubber	Andy García	
1993	Jurassic Park	Ian Malcolm	Jeff Goldblum	
1993	Undercover Blues	Jefferson Blue	Dennis Quaid	
1993	Wilder Napalm	Wallace Foudroyant	Dennis Quaid	
1993	Look Who's Talking Now!	James Ubriacco	John Travolta	
1993	Sleepless in Seattle	Sam Baldwin	Tom Hanks	
1993	Philadelphia	Andrew Beckett	Tom Hanks	
1993	The Pelican Brief	Fletcher Coal	Tony Goldwyn	
1993	Indecent Proposal	David Murphy	Woody Harrelson	
1993	The Firm	Mitch McDeere	Tom Cruise	
1993	Alive	Antonio Balbi	Vincent Spano	
1994	The Specialist	Tomas Leon	Eric Roberts	
1994	Interview with the Vampire	Lestat de Lioncourt	Tom Cruise	
1995	Something to Talk About	Eddie Bichon	Dennis Quaid	
1995	The Net	Jack Devlin	Jeremy Northam	
1995	Cutthroat Island	William Shaw	Matthew Modine	
1995	Apollo 13	Jim Lovell	Tom Hanks	
1995	Magic in the Water	Jack Black	Mark Harmon	
1996	Night Falls on Manhattan	Sean Casey	Andy García	
1996	Muppet Treasure Island	Billy Bones	Billy Connolly	
1996	Mission: Impossible	Ethan Hunt	Tom Cruise	
1996	Jerry Maguire	Jerry Maguire	Tom Cruise	
1996	Multiplicity	Doug Kinney	Michael Keaton	
1996	Fly Away Home	Thomas Alden	Jeff Daniels	
1996	Bottle Rocket	Dignan	Owen Wilson	
1996	The Cable Guy	Robin's Date	Owen Wilson	
1997	As Good as It Gets	Simon Bishop	Greg Kinnear	
1997	Mr. Wrong	Whitman Crawford	Bill Pullman	
1997	Kiss the Girls	Dr. William Rudolph	Tony Goldwyn	
1997	In & Out	Cameron Drake	Matt Dillon	
1998	Close Encounters of the Third Kind	Roy Neary (1998 redub)	Richard Dreyfuss	
1998	You've Got Mail	Joe Fox	Tom Hanks	
1998	U.S. Marshals	Deputy Cosmo Renfro	Joe Pantoliano	
1998	Desperate Measures	Frank Conner	Andy García	
1998	Deep Impact	Dr. Gus Partenza	Jon Favreau	
1999	Muppets from Space	Gate Guard	Ray Liotta	
1999	Magnolia	Frank T.J. Mackey	Tom Cruise	
1999	The Green Mile	Paul Edgecomb	Tom Hanks	
2000	Traffic	Arnie Metzger	Dennis Quaid	
2000	Mission: Impossible 2	Ethan Hunt	Tom Cruise	
2000	What Planet Are You From?	Perry Gordon	Greg Kinnear	
2000	Loser	Edward Alcott	Greg Kinnear	
2000	Beethoven's 3rd	Richard Newton	Judge Reinhold	
2001	Vanilla Sky	David Aames	Tom Cruise	
2001	The Unsaid	Michael Hunter	Andy García	
2001	Beethoven's 4th	Richard Newton	Judge Reinhold	
2002	Auto Focus	Bob Crane	Greg Kinnear	
2002	Abandon	Dr. David Schaffer	Tony Goldwyn	
2002	Minority Report	John Anderton	Tom Cruise	
2002	Austin Powers in Goldmember	Tom Cruise	Tom Cruise	
2002	Clockstoppers	Henry Gates	Michael Biehn	
2002	Enough	Robbie	Noah Wyle	
2003	Quicksand	Martin Raikes	Michael Keaton	
2003	The Last Samurai	Captain Nathan Algren	Tom Cruise	
2004	Twisted	Mike Delmarco	Andy García	
2004	Imaginary Heroes	Ben Travis	Jeff Daniels	
2004	Ladder 49	Mike Kennedy	John Travolta	
2004	Collateral	Vincent	Tom Cruise	
2004	The Grudge	Peter Kirk	Bill Pullman	
2005	Fun with Dick and Jane	Joe Cleeman	Richard Burgi	
2005	The Lazarus Child	Jack Heywood	Andy García	
2005	The Lost City	Fico Fellove	Andy García	
2005	Yours, Mine & Ours	Frank Beardsley	Dennis Quaid	
2005	Capote	Truman Capote	Philip Seymour Hoffman	
2005	Slow Burn	Ford Cole	Ray Liotta	
2006	Talladega Nights: The Ballad of Ricky Bobby	Jean Girard	Sacha Baron Cohen	
2006	The Da Vinci Code	Robert Langdon	Tom Hanks	
2006	The Last Time	Ted Riker	Michael Keaton	
2006	Unknown	Broken Nose / Richard McCain	Greg Kinnear	
2006	Little Miss Sunshine	Richard Hoover	Greg Kinnear	
2006	The Prestige	Nikola Tesla	David Bowie	
2007	Lions for Lambs	Senator Jasper Irving	Tom Cruise	
2007	The Air I Breathe	Fingers	Andy García	
2007	Feast of Love	Bradley Smith	Greg Kinnear	
2008	Tropic Thunder	Les Grossman	Tom Cruise	
2008	Valkyrie	Claus von Stauffenberg	Tom Cruise	
2009	The Pink Panther 2	Vincenzo Roccara Squarcialupi Brancaleon	Andy García	
2009	The Invention of Lying	Jim	Philip Seymour Hoffman	
2009	Angels & Demons	Robert Langdon	Tom Hanks	
2010	Knight and Day	Roy Miller / Matthew Knight	Tom Cruise	
2010	The Other Guys	Captain Gene Mauch	Michael Keaton	
2010	The Switch	Leonard	Jeff Goldblum	
2011	I Don't Know How She Does It	Richard Reddy	Greg Kinnear	
2011	Mission: Impossible – Ghost Protocol	Ethan Hunt	Tom Cruise	
2011	J. Edgar	Inspector Schell	Christian Clemenson	
2011	Larry Crowne	Larry Crowne	Tom Hanks	
2011	The Smurfs	Henri	Tim Gunn	
2012	Rock of Ages	Stacee Jaxx	Tom Cruise	
2012	Jack Reacher	Jack Reacher	Tom Cruise	
2012	The Dream Team	Commentator	Laurent Biras	
2013	Oblivion	Jack Harper	Tom Cruise	
2014	Let's Be Cops	Detective Brolin	Andy García	
2014	Edge of Tomorrow	Major William Cage	Tom Cruise	
2014	John Wick	Avi	Dean Winters	
2015	The Man Who Knew Infinity	Bertrand Russell	Jeremy Northam	
2015	Going Clear	Tom Cruise	Tom Cruise	
2015	Mission: Impossible – Rogue Nation	Ethan Hunt	Tom Cruise	
2015	Club Life	William Taylor	Al Sapienza	
2016	A Hologram for the King	Alan Clay	Tom Hanks	
2016	Inferno	Robert Langdon	Tom Hanks	
2016	In a Valley of Violence	Clyde Martin	John Travolta	
2016	Jack Reacher: Never Go Back	Jack Reacher	Tom Cruise	
2016	The Belko Experiment	Barry Norris	Tony Goldwyn	
2017	The Mummy	Nick Morton	Tom Cruise	
2017	American Made	Barry Seal	Tom Cruise	
2017	The Hitman's Bodyguard	Moreno	Barry Atsma	
2018	Mission: Impossible – Fallout	Ethan Hunt	Tom Cruise	
2019	Midsommar	Odd	Mats Blomgren	
2020	News of the World	Captain Jefferson Kyle Kidd	Tom Hanks	
2022	Top Gun: Maverick	Pete "Maverick" Mitchell	Tom Cruise	
2023	Mission: Impossible – Dead Reckoning Part One	Ethan Hunt	Tom Cruise	
2023	Retribution	Anders Muller	Matthew Modine	

==== Television (Animation, Italian dub) ====
Year	Title	Role(s)	Notes	Ref
1980	Casshan	Casshern	Main cast	
1999–2000	Cowboy Bebop	Vicious	Main cast	
2000–2004	South Park	Various characters	Recurring role (seasons 1–4)	
2002	The Christmas Orange	Lenny	TV film	
2002–present	Futurama	Robot Devil	Recurring role (season 6+)	
2002–present	Futurama	Yancy Fry Sr.	1 episode (season 4x07)	
2002–present	Futurama	Various characters	Recurring role (season 4+)	
2007–2008	Hunter × Hunter	Hisoka Morow	Main cast	

==== Television (Live action, Italian dub) ====
Year	Title	Role(s)	Notes	Original actor	Ref
1984–1988	Three's Company	Larry Dallas	Recurring role (seasons 1–6)	Richard Kline	
1988	The Great Escape II: The Untold Story	Major John Dodge	TV film	Christopher Reeve	
1991	Chains of Gold	Scott Barnes	TV film	John Travolta	
1991	Extralarge	John Philip Dumas	Main cast (season 1)	Philip Michael Thomas	
1993	Fallen Angels	Trouble Boy #1	1 episode (season 1, episode 2)	Tom Hanks	
1993	Tequila and Bonetti	Nico "Nick" Bonetti	Main cast	Jack Scalia	
1994	Next Door	Matt Coler	TV film	James Woods	
1999	Swing Vote	Joseph Michael Kirkland	TV film	Andy García	
2003	Friends	Gavin Mitchell	3 episodes (season 9)	Dermot Mulroney	
2004–2008	Malcolm in the Middle	Hal	Main cast	Bryan Cranston	
2005	Fat Actress	John Travolta	1 episode (season 1, episode 1)	John Travolta	
2010	The Pacific	Narrator	TV miniseries	Tom Hanks	
2010–2011	Stargate Universe	Nicholas Rush	Main cast	Robert Carlyle	
