= Don't Hurt Me, My Love =

1974 film

- Directed by: Vittorio Sindoni
- Screenplay by: Ghigo De Chiara; Vittorio Sindoni
- Produced by: Nicholas De Witt
- Starring: Walter Chiari; Macha Méril; Luciano Salce; Valentina Cortese; Leonora Fani; Roberto Chevalier
- Cinematography: Safai Teherani
- Edited by: Mariano Faggiani
- Music by: Enrico Simonetti
- Release date: 1974
- Country: Italy
- Language: Italian

Don't Hurt Me, My Love (Italian: Amore mio non farmi male) is a 1974 comedy film co-written and directed by Vittorio Sindoni.

== Cast ==
- Walter Chiari as Paolo De Simone
- Macha Méril as Linda De Simone
- Luciano Salce as Carlo Foschini
- Valentina Cortese as Sabina Foschini
- Leonora Fani as Anna De Simone
- Roberto Chevalier as Marcello Foschini
- Gabriella Giorgelli as Cicci
- Ninetto Davoli as Ninetto Procacci
- Leopoldo Trieste as Lawyer Musumeci
- Pia Velsi as Sora Teresa
- Enzo Robutti as Laganà
- Mico Cundari as Doctor
- Sandra Mantegna as Wanda
- Gino Pagnani as Rotunno
- Filippo De Gara as Prosecutor
- Carla Mancini as Greta
- Orazio Stracuzzi as Oro Falso

== Production ==
The film was produced by Megavision Sepac. It was shot in Rome in the summer of 1974.

== Release ==
The film was distributed in Italian cinemas by P.A.C. starting from 14 October 1974. Due to its taboo subject matter, focusing on two teenagers losing their virginity, the film initially received an 18+ rating; following protests and criticism in the press, the age restriction was reduced to 14+ on 29 October 1974.

== Reception ==
The film was a commercial success, grossing over 1.1 billion lire at the Italian box office. It was generally well received by critics. Paolo Mereghetti described it as "successfully balancing farcical elements with a cheerful slice of social observation, [as well as] caricature and innuendo with an ironic and almost tender lightness". Following its success, Sindoni directed an immediate sequel of the film with the same cast, Son tornate a fiorire le rose, released in 1975.
