= Young Husbands =

1958 film

- Film poster
- Directed by: Mauro Bolognini
- Written by: Mauro Bolognini; Enzo Curreli; Pasquale Festa Campanile; Pier Paolo Pasolini
- Produced by: Emanuele Cassuto
- Starring: Isabelle Corey; Antonio Cifariello; Franco Interlenghi
- Cinematography: Armando Nannuzzi
- Edited by: Roberto Cinquini
- Music by: Nino Rota
- Release date: 12 March 1958
- Running time: 98 minutes
- Country: Italy
- Language: Italian

Young Husbands (Italian: Giovani mariti) is a 1958 Italian comedy film directed by Mauro Bolognini. It was entered into the 1958 Cannes Film Festival. For this film Armando Nannuzzi won a Silver Ribbon (Nastro d'Argento) for Best Cinematography.

== Cast ==
- Anne-Marie Baumann as Fanny
- Gérard Blain as Marcello
- Guido Celano as Franco's father
- Roberto Chevalier as Checchino
- Antonio Cifariello as Ettore
- Isabelle Corey as Laura
- Ennio Girolami as Franco
- Anna Maria Guarnieri as Ornella
- Franco Interlenghi as Antonio
- Sylva Koscina as Mara
- Antonella Lualdi as Lucia
- Lilly Mantovani as Lily
- Raf Mattioli as Giulio
- Rosy Mazzacurati as Donatella
- Lila Rocco as Gilda
- Marcella Rovena as Franco's mother
