= Antonio Canal (actor) =

Antonio Canal (1936 – 25 September 2026) was a Spanish actor. He appeared in over 80 films and television programs between 1963 to 2019, and was best known for playing Father Froilán Cardeñosa in the Spanish historical drama television series Cuéntame cómo pasó.

Canal died on 25 September 2026, at the age of 90.
