= Arahuetes =

- Municipality
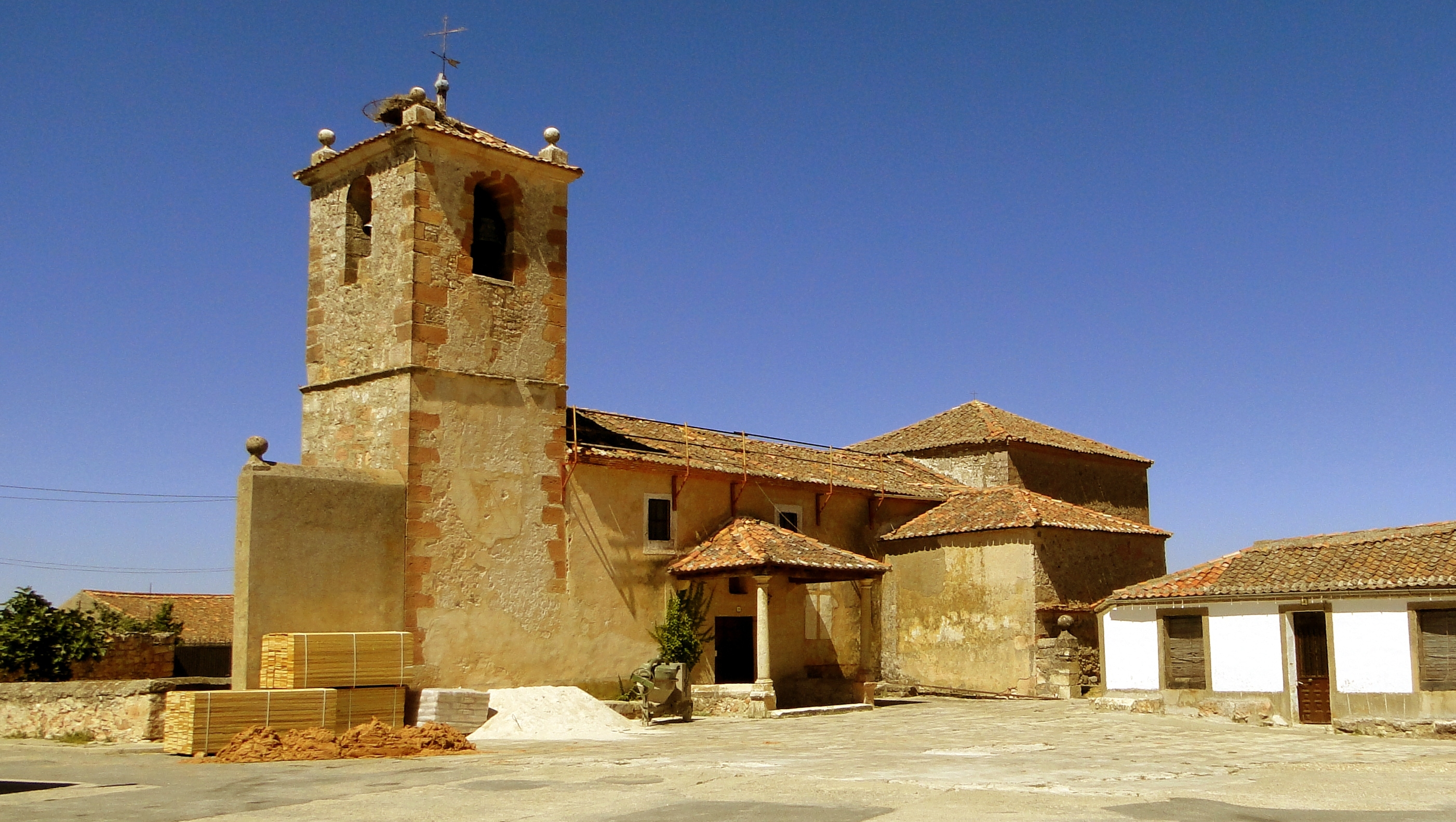
- Interactive map of Arahuetes
- Coordinates: 41°08′16″N 3°51′24″W
- Country: Spain
- Autonomous community: Castile and León
- Province: Segovia
- Comarca: Pedraza

Government
  - Alcalde (Mayor): Pedro Francisco Blanco Álvaro

Area
  - Total: 16.36 km^{2} (6.32 sq mi)
- Elevation: 1,092 m (3,583 ft)

Population (2025-01-01)
  - Total: 31
  - Density: 1.9/km^{2} (4.9/sq mi)
- Time zone: UTC+1 (CET)
  - Summer (DST): UTC+2 (CEST)
- Website: Official website

Arahuetes is a municipality located in the province of Segovia, in Castile and León, Spain. According to the 2018 census (INE), the municipality has a population of 32 inhabitants.

The village is known for having been the filming location of the fictional town Sagrillas, the hometown of the family that is the protagonist of the television series Cuéntame cómo pasó.
