= Nacho Duato =

Spanish ballet dancer and choreographer

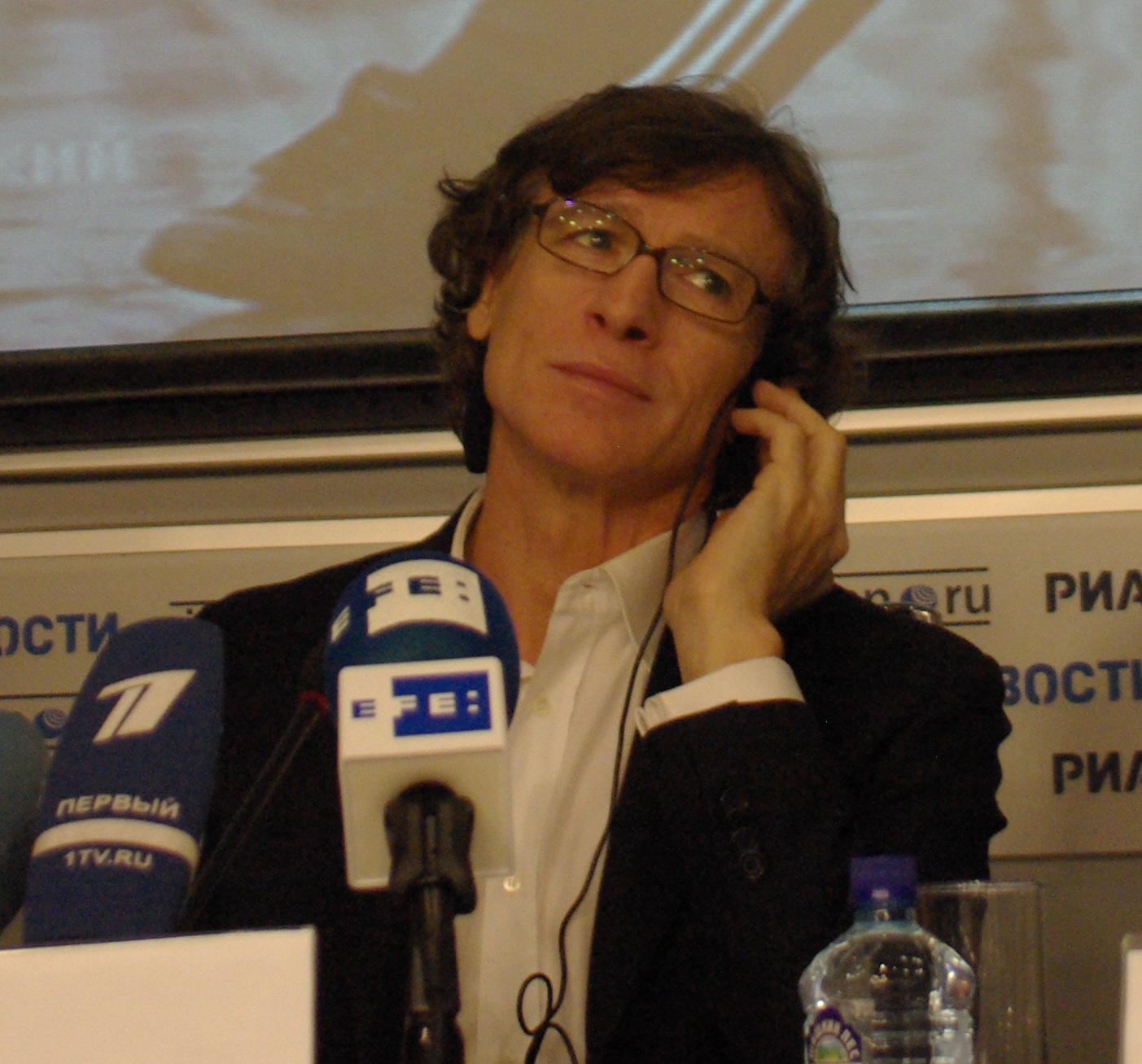
- Born: 8 January 1957 (age 69); Valencia, Spain
- Known for: Choreographer
- Relatives: Ana Duato (cousin); Joaquín Duato (cousin); Miguel Bernardeau (second nephew)

Juan Ignacio Duato Barcia, also known as Nacho Duato (born 8 January 1957) is a Spanish modern ballet dancer and choreographer. Since 2014, Duato has been artistic director of the Berlin State Ballet..

== Career ==
Nacho Duato studied at the Rambert School of London, Maurice Béjart's Rudra School in Brussels and Alvin Ailey American Dance Theater in New York City.

He started his dancing career in Stockholm's Cullberg Ballet and later joined Nederlands Dans Theater, under artistic director Jiří Kylián; he remained with the company for ten years. In 1983, he choreographed Jardí tancat (Catalan: 'Shut garden') to music composed by Maria del Mar Bonet. The company was awarded the first prize in the Internationaler Choreographischer Wettbewerb, Köln. In 1988, Duato was appointed NDT resident choreographer together with Hans van Manen and Jiří Kylián.

From 1990 to 2011, Nacho Duato was the artistic director at Compania Nacional de Danza. Between 2011 and 2014, he led the ballet company of the Mikhailovsky Theatre in Russia. In 2014, Nacho Duato became general and artistic director at the Berlin State Ballet. In 2016, Michael Mueller, Mayor of Berlin, announced that the city would not extend Duato's contract with the company when it expired in 2019. Sasha Waltz and Johannes Ohman succeeded him as joint artistic directors of the Berlin State Ballet. Duato returned to his previous post in Saint Petersburg as artistic director of the Mikhailovsky ballet company.

== Prizes and awards ==
- 1983: Internationaler Choreographischer Wettbewerb, Köln, First prize for Jardí tancat.
- 1987: VSCD Gouden Dansprijs for his dancing skilfulness
- 1995: The grade of Chevalier dans l'Ordre des Arts et des Lettres which is awarded annually by the French Embassy in Spain.
- 1998: Gold Medal for Merit in the Fine Arts awarded by the Spanish Council.
- 2000: Prix Benois de la Danse awarded by the International Dance Association at the Stuttgart Opera, for his choreography Multiplicity. Forms of Silence and Emptiness (Multiplicidad, formas de silencio y vacío).
- 2003: Spanish National Dance Award (Premio Nacional de Danza) for choreography
