= Joaquín Duato =

American corporate executive (b. 1962)

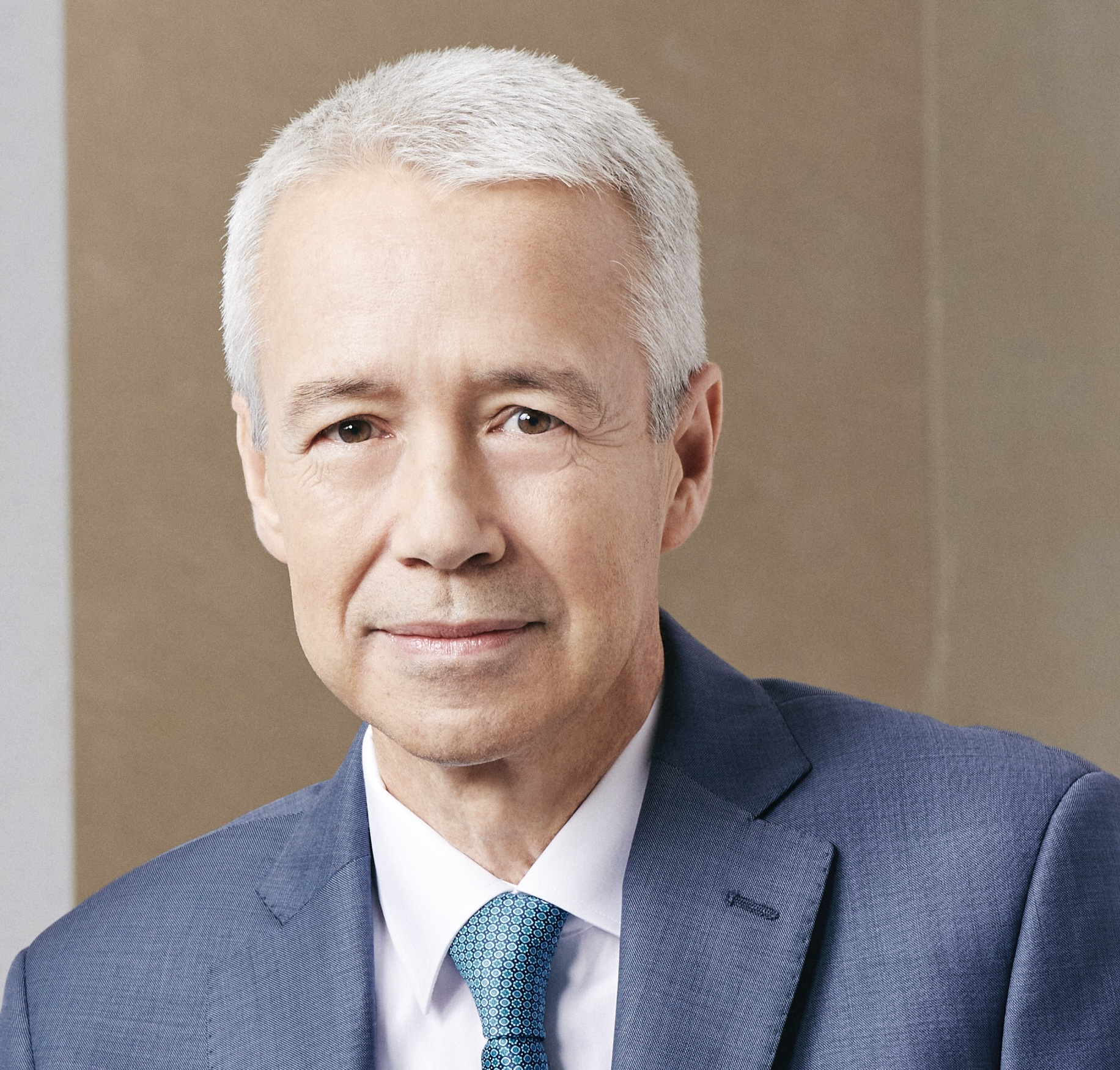
- Born: 1962 (age 63–64); Spain
- Citizenship: Spain; U.S.
- Education: ESADE Business School (MBA); Thunderbird School of Global Management
- Occupation: Businessman
- Years active: 1989-present
- Title: Chairman and CEO of Johnson & Johnson
- Term: 2022-present
- Children: 2
- Relatives: Ana Duato (sister); Miguel Bernardeau (nephew); Nacho Duato (cousin)

Joaquín Duato Boix (born April 1962) is a Spanish-American business executive. He is the chairman and chief executive officer (CEO) of Johnson & Johnson, an American multinational conglomerate. He is the company's eighth CEO since it became a publicly-traded company in 1944. In 2023, Duato received $28.4 million, the highest paid CEO of any major US pharmaceutical company.

== Early life and education ==
Duato grew up in Valencia, Spain. His career in health care was influenced by his family. His mother was a nurse, his grandfather was a pediatrician, and his grandmother a pharmacist. Duato speaks English, Spanish, and Italian. He received a Master of Business Administration from ESADE Business School in Barcelona, Spain, and a Master of International Management from the Thunderbird School of Global Management in Phoenix, Arizona. Duato is a dual citizen of Spain and the US.

== Career ==
In 1989, Duato began his career with Johnson & Johnson, joining Janssen Pharmaceuticals in Spain. After moving to the US in 2002, Duato was appointed executive vice president, worldwide chairman, pharmaceuticals in 2011. His growth strategy led to the turnaround of Johnson & Johnson’s struggling pharmaceutical business in the early 2000s.

In 2018 when he was promoted to vice chairman of Johnson & Johnson’s executive committee, he led the pharmaceuticals and consumer product divisions and oversaw supply-chain and technology operations. He also was interim Chief Information Officer.

Duato was appointed CEO in August 2021 which became effective in January 2022. He was also appointed to the company’s board of directors. In November 2022, he was elected chairman, effective January 2023. Duato oversaw the separation of Johnson & Johnson's consumer health segment, now an independent publicly traded company, Kenvue. During this time, Duato was the executive sponsor of the company's African Ancestry Leadership Council.

In 2023, Duato was the highest paid CEO of the major pharmaceutical companies, earning $28.4 million, a 117% increase over 2022.

== Board membership and honors ==
In recognition of his efforts, Duato was named a Healthcare Businesswomen's Association Honorable Mentor honoree in 2017. In 2021, Duato was ranked #3 on the NJBIZ Manufacturing Power 50 list. The following year, Duato received the 2022 ESADE Award for his leadership with Johnson & Johnson. In 2023 Duato was bestowed with the Order of Civil Merit, Commander by Number, by King Felipe VI of Spain. He is also a member of the Business Roundtable.

Duato has been on the boards of the United States-Spain Council, UNICEF USA, Tsinghua University School of Pharmaceutical Sciences, and the Hess Corporation. He was chair of Pharmaceutical Research and Manufacturers of America from 2017 to 2018.

== Personal life ==
Duato is married, with two adult children, and lives in Pennsylvania.

He is the brother of actress Ana Duato, uncle of actor Miguel Bernardeau, and cousin of dancer Nacho Duato.
