= Jose Duato =

José Francisco Duato Marín (Alberic, Valencia, born 1958) is a Spanish professor and researcher awarded the National Prize for Research Julio Rey Pastor in 2009 and the King Jaime I Prize for new technologies in 2006. His research is based mainly in the field of interconnection networks and develops its role as Full Professor in the Department of Computer Engineering (DISCA) at the Polytechnic University of Valencia.

First author of the book "Interconnection Networks: An Engineering Approach", published in the United States by the IEEE Computer Society Press in 1997 and by Morgan Kaufmann in 2002. It is the most quoted book on interconnection networks in existence today (over 1400 citations). Is being used by engineers designing interconnection networks in the market-leading companies (IBM, Compaq, Intel, Sun Microsystems) and to provide doctoral programs, especially in the United States.

Co-author of the chapter on interconnection networks in the fourth edition of the book "Computer Architecture: A Quantitative Approach" by John Hennessy and Dave Patterson. This is the most widely used and cited book on computer architecture available today (more than 8000 citations in total).

In 2009, Prof. Duato received the prestigious national award "Julio Rey Pastor", in the field of mathematics and information technologies and the communications, for his contributions of international importance in the field of the interconnection networks and for the transference of these results to the industry.
