= Nicolás Cabré =

Argentine actor and television host

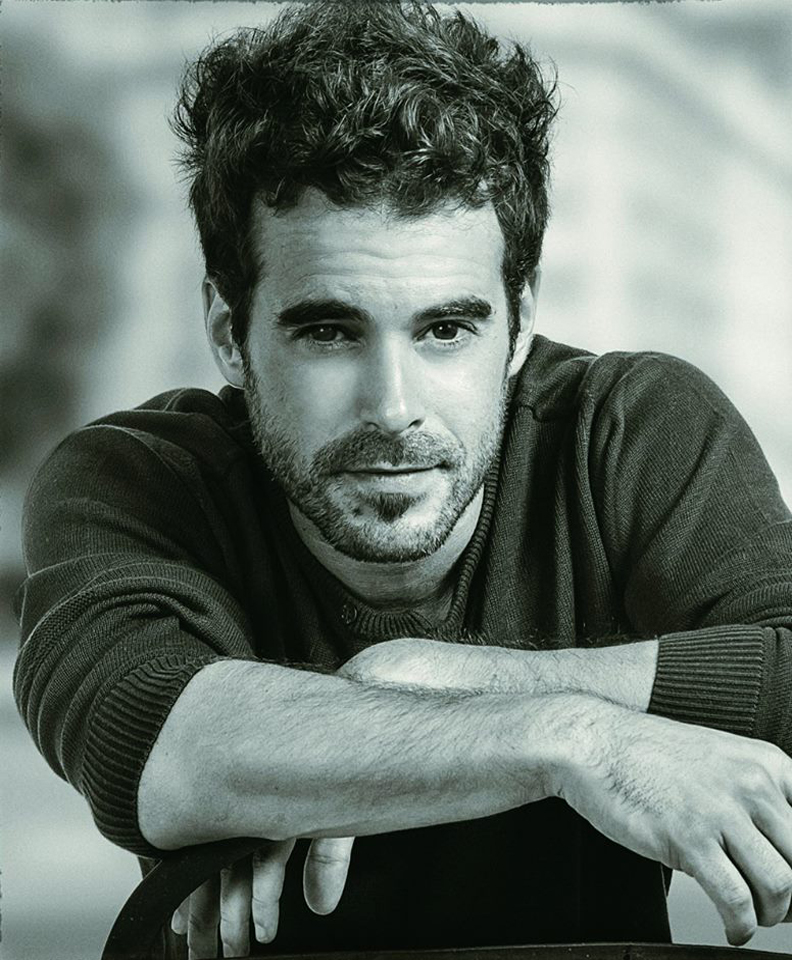
- Born: Nicolás Cabré; 6 February 1980 (age 46); Mataderos, Buenos Aires, Argentina
- Occupations: Actor, Socialite
- Years active: 1990–present
- Spouse: Eugenia Tobal (m. 2011–2012)
- Children: Rufina Cabré Suárez (n. 2013)

Nicolás Gabriel Cabré Brickenstaedt (born 6 February 1980) is an Argentine actor and television host. Known for his film, stage and television work, he has won ACE Award and earned four Martín Fierro Award nominations. Cabré is also a regular feature in Argentine press, and his off–screen life is widely reported.

== Filmography ==
Year	Title	Role	Notes
1990	La Ola está de Fiesta	Himself	(TV Show) (1990–91)
1992	Son de diez	Juancito	(TV Series) (1992–94)
1995	¡Hola Papi!	Tomás	(TV Series)
1995	Algo en común	Nico	(Stage) ACE Award for Best New Actor; Estrella de Mar Award for Best New Actor
1996	Carola Casini	Camilo	(TV Series)
1997	Poliladron	Unknown	(TV Series)
1997	Fuga de cerebros	Fideo	Panambí Award for Best Leading Actor; Nominated — Silver Condor Award for Best New Actor
1998	Gasoleros	Alejo	(TV Series) (1998–99)
1999	Vulnerables	Martín Albarracín	Nominated — Martín Fierro Award for Best Supporting Actor
1999	Yepeto	Antonio	
2000	El cartero	Unknown	(Stage)
2000	Tiempo final	Himself	(TV Show) (1 episode) Nominated — Martín Fierro Award for Best Supporting Actor
2001	Ilusiones	Rafael Puntin	(TV Series) Nominated — Martín Fierro Award for Best Supporting Actor
2001	Déjala correr	Diego	
2001	Tiempo final	Himself	(TV Show) (1 episode)
2002	Novela Son amores	Pablo Marquesi	(TV Series) (2002–03) Nominated — Martín Fierro Award for Best Actor in Comedy
2002	Novela Son amores	Pablo Marquesi	(Stage)
2003	Ciudad del sol	Pablo	
2004	Sin código	Axel Etcheverry	(TV Series) (2004–05) Nominated — Martín Fierro Award for Best Actor in Show or Mini Series
2004	El gran regreso	Unknown	(Stage)
2005	Botines	Himself	(TV Show) (3 episodes)
2006	Al límite	Various	(TV Show)
2007	Tres de corazones	Ángel	
2008	Por amor a vos	León Carloni	(TV Series)
2009	Papá por un día	Federico	
2009	Botineras	Cristian Flores	(TV Series) (2009–10)
2011-2012	Los únicos	Axel Etcheverry	(TV Series)
2013	Mis amigos de siempre	Simón	TV series
2017	Cuéntame cómo pasó	Antonio Martínez	TV series

== Awards and nominations ==
Year	Award	Category	Project	Result
1995	ACE Awards	Best New Actor	Algo en común	Won
1996	Estrella de Mar Awards	Best New Actor	Algo en común	Won
1998	Panambí Awards	Best Leading Actor	Fuga de cerebros	Won
1998	Silver Condor Awards	Best New Actor	Fuga de cerebros	Nominated
2000	Martín Fierro Awards	Best Supporting Actor	Vulnerables / Ilusiones / Tiempo final	Nominated
2002	Martín Fierro Awards	Best Actor in Comedy	Son amores	Nominated
2003	Martín Fierro Awards	Best Actor in Comedy	Son amores	Nominated
2004	Martín Fierro Awards	Best Actor in Show or Mini Series	Sin código	Nominated
2011	Martín Fierro Awards	Lead actor in a novel	Botineras	Nominated
2011	Kids Choice Awards Argentina	Best actor	Los únicos	Pending

=== Nominations ===
- 2013 Martín Fierro Awards
  - Best actor of daily comedy (for Mis amigos de siempre)
