= Lunetta Savino =

Italian actress (born 1957)

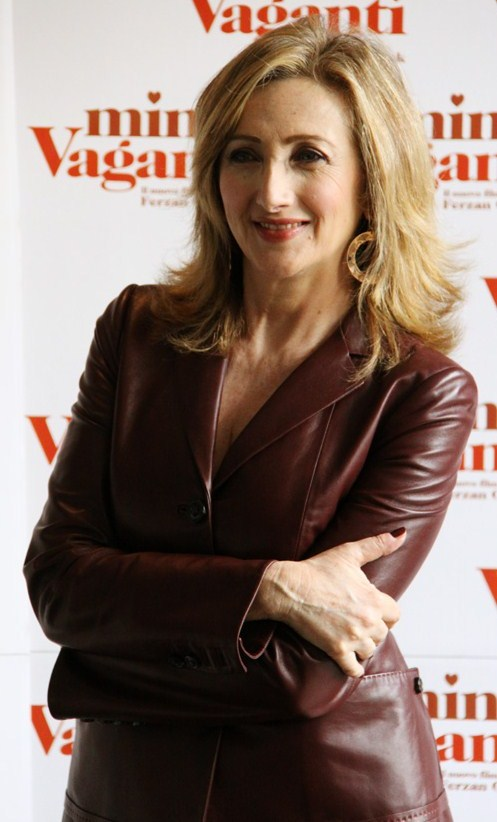
- Savino in 2010
- Born: 2 November 1957 (age 68); Bari, Italy
- Occupation: Actress

Lunetta Savino (born 2 November 1957) is an Italian theatre and movie actress. She's best known for portraying Concetta Gargiulo in Italian soap opera Un medico in famiglia (1998–2009). She later played lead roles in other Italian television productions such as Il bello delle donne (2001–2002), Raccontami (2006–2008), È arrivata la felicità (2015–2018) and Le indagini di Lolita Lobosco (2021–present). Her film credits includes comedy Free the Fish (2000), drama Saturn in Opposition (2007), romantic dramedy Loose Cannons (2010), comedy An Almost Ordinary Summer (2019), and drama Diamonds (2024).

== Career ==
After graduating at Teatro "Alessandra Galante Garrone" in Bologna, Lunetta Savino made her stage debut in 1981 with Macbeth. Savino has enjoyed a successful stage career, performing in several plays including an Italian-language version of The Merchant of Venice (1984), Sorelle Materassi (from a novel by Aldo Palazzeschi, 1988), and Medea (1994). In 1995, she made her stage debut at Teatro dell'Orologio in Rome with Prova orale per membri esterni, a play by Claudio Grimaldi in which she starred as an oral sex instructor. The play proved to be extremely successful, being replicated for six seasons in many Italian cities.

In 1982, Savino made her screen debut, playing a small part in Grog, directed by Francesco Laudadio.

From 1998 to 2010, Savino played her breakthrough role. She starred as flamboyant au-pair girl from Southern Italy Cettina Gargiulo, a leading character in Un medico in famiglia, one of the most famous Italian TV-series of all times.

Savino has taken part in many TV series in her country, such as Il bello delle donne, Raccontami and Il figlio della luna.

In 2010, she starred as Stefania Cantone, a mother struggling with her grown-up son's sexual orientation, in Ferzan Özpetek's internationally acclaimed movie Loose Cannons

She briefly starred alongside Luciana Littizzetto in the TV series Fuoriclasse, playing the leading character's dishonest sister.

In 2015, Savino starred in Rai Uno's primetime TV series È arrivata la felicità, once again playing the role of a mother struggling with her child's homosexuality.

== Personal life ==
Savino has a son, Antonio, born in 1988.

She supports the Italian centre-left party, and she once took part in a rally against former Italian prime minister Silvio Berlusconi.

While playing a homophobic mother twice on screen, Savino is a supporter of lesbian and gay rights in Italy. She defines herself as a Catholic.

== Filmography ==
=== Film ===
Year	Title	Role(s)	Notes
1982	Grog	Elena De Rossi	
1983	Where's Picone?	Street Woman	Uncredited
1985	Chi mi aiuta?	Franceca	
1998	Marriages	Lucia	
1998	Cucciolo	Marisa	
2000	Free the Fish	Lunetta	
2001	Se fossi in te	Veronica	
2002	W la scimmia	Lilla	
2002	Amore con la S maiuscola	Carmela	
2002	Sono stato negro pure io	Herself	Documentary
2005	Never Again as Before	Cesare's mother	
2007	Saturn in Opposition	Minnie Marchetti	
2009	Oggi sposi	Violetta	
2010	Loose Cannons	Stefania Cantone	
2011	Bar Sport	Old Lady	Cameo
2012	Tutto tutto niente niente	Frengo's mother	
2013	Fiabeschi torna a casa	Aunt Maria	
2013	La fuga	Mother	Short film
2014	Do You See Me?	Michela	
2018	Amici come prima	Carla	
2019	An Almost Ordinary Summer	Ida	
2019	Rosa	Rosa	
2022	My Soul Summer	Daria	
2023	Io e mio fratello	Marilena	
2024	Diamonds	Eleonora	

=== Television ===
Year	Title	Role(s)	Notes
1985	Aeroporto internazionale	Nun #1	Episode: "Incontro ai transiti"
1998–2009	Un medico in famiglia	Concetta "Cettina" Gargiulo	Main role (seasons 1-5), guest star (season 6)
2001–2002	Il bello delle donne	Agnese Astuti-Borsi	Main role (seasons 1-2)
2006–2008	Raccontami	Elena Sorrentino	Lead role
2007	Il figlio della luna	Lucia Frisone	Television film
2008	Il coraggio di Angela	Angela	Television film
2009	Due mamme di troppo	Lellè Pelliconi	Television film
2014–2015	Il candidato	Bianca De Mojana	Main role
2015	Fuoriclasse	Beatrice Passamaglia	Main role (seasons 3)
2015–2018	È arrivata la felicità	Giovanna Fabbri	Main role
2016	Felicia Impastato	Felicia Impastato	Television film
2018	Il fulgore di Dony	Marco's mother	Television film
2021–present	Lolita Lobosco	Nunzia	Main role
2022–2024	Studio Battaglia	Marina Di Marco	Main role
2024	Libera	Libera Orlando	Lead role
