= Ana Duato =

Spanish actress

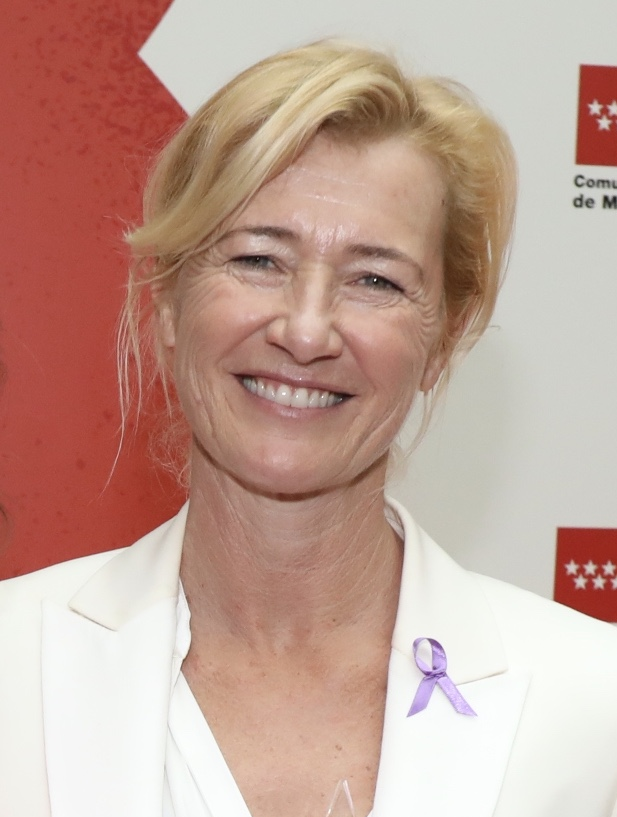
- Ana Duato at the awards ceremony for International Women's Day in 2019.
- Born: Ana Consuelo Duato Boix; 18 June 1968 (age 57); Valencia, Spain
- Occupation: Actress
- Years active: 1987–present
- Height: 1.73 m (5 ft 8 in)
- Spouse: Miguel Ángel Bernardeau (m. 1989)
- Children: 2, including Miguel Bernardeau
- Relatives: Joaquín Duato (brother); Nacho Duato (cousin)

Ana Consuelo Duato Boix (born 18 June 1968) is a Spanish actress, who is best known for portraying Mercedes Fernández in the television series Cuéntame cómo pasó.

== Biography ==
Ana Consuelo Duato Boix was born on 18 June 1968, in Valencia. She has one older sister, named Zulema Duato Boix. She is the sister of business executive Joaquín Duato and cousin of famous dancer and choreographer Nacho Duato.

== Personal life ==
In 1989, she married the television producer Miguel Ángel Bernardeau Maestro. On 12 December 1996, she gave birth to the couple's first child, a boy, whom they called Miguel Bernardeau. In 2004, she gave birth to the couple's second child, a girl, whom they called María Bernardeau Duato, was born in Madrid, Spain.

== Lawsuits ==
On 7 April 2016, Ana Duato was accused of Tax evasion and Money laundering crimes together with the actor, Imanol Arias and her husband, Miguel Ángel Bernardeau, in the Panama Papers scandal as the owner of an offshore company, Trekel Trading Limited, based on the island nation of Niue that held a bank account under his complete control at the Swiss bank Banque Franck SA. In May 2016, a judicial investigation was opened for the alleged crimes.

== Career ==
Ana Duato first role was with the Spanish director Basilio Martín Patino in 1987.

Between 2001 and 2023, she starred in the Televisión Española prime-time series Cuéntame cómo pasó as Mercedes Fernández, the mother of a Spanish middle-class family during the years of the rule of Francisco Franco, the transition to democracy, and the current democracy.

== UNICEF ==
As part of her charity work, Ana Duato has been one of the UNICEF Goodwill Ambassadors since December 2000.

== Filmography ==
=== Film ===
Year	Movie	Character	Director	Notes
1987	Madrid		Basilio Martín Patino	
1989	Un negro con un saxo	Lidia	Francesc Bellmunt	
1991	Cómo levantar 1000 kilos	Sara	Antonio Hernández	
1992	Una estación de paso	Juan's mother	Gracia Querejeta	
1993	Y creó en el nombre del padre		Óscar del Caz	Short film
1994	Los amigos del muerto	Friend	Icíar Bollaín	Short film
1994	Amor propio	Judge's Assistant	Mario Camus	
1996	Adosados	Paula	Mario Camus	
1996	The Dog in the Manger	Marcela	Pilar Miró	
1997	The Color of the Clouds	Tina	Mario Camus	
1998	La vuelta de El Coyote	Joy	Mario Camus	
1999	Los Lobos de Washington	Tertuliana	Javier Bardem	
2000	Las razones de mis amigos	Leticia	Gerardo Herrero	

=== Television ===
Year	Title	Character	Network	Notes
1989–1990	Brigada Central	Virginia	Televisión Española	14 episodes
1993	Celia	María del Pilar Gálvez de Montalbán	Televisión Española	6 episodes
1993	Para Elisa		Televisión Española	1 episode
1993	Lleno, por favor	Mother	Antena 3	1 episode
1994	Colegio Mayor	Bibi	Telemadrid	1 episode
1994–1995	Villarriba y Villabajo	Paulina	Televisión Española	25 episodes
1995–1997	Médico de familia	Irene Cerezo	Telecinco	29 episodes
1997–1998	Querido maestro	Lola	Telecinco	22 episodes
1999–2000	Mediterráneo	Clara Salgado	Telecinco	13 episodes
2000	Estudio 1		Televisión Española	1 episode
2001	Severo Ochoa. La conquista de un Nobel	Carmen Covián	Televisión Española	2 episodes
2001–2023	Cuéntame cómo pasó	Mercedes Fernández López	Televisión Española	413 episodes
