= List of Italian child actors =

This is a list of child actors from Italy. Films and/or television series they appeared in are mentioned only if they were still a child at the time of filming.

Current child actors (under the age of eighteen) are indicated by boldface.

Name	Born [Died]	Years active (as child actors) & selected filmography
Adrea Scirè Borghese	1942 [2024]	1955 – Amici per la pelle
Amendola, Ferruccio	1930 [2001]	1943 – Gian Burrasca (1943)
Apicella, Tina	1946	1951 – Bellissima (1951)
Argento, Asia	1975	1984–1989 – Zoo (1988)
Arru, Andrea	2007	2020-present – Di4ries (2022-23) – Diabolik: Who Are You? (2023)
Baldini, Oreste	1962	1974-1975 – The Godfather Part II (1974) – The Flower in His Mouth (1975)
Balestri, Andrea	1963	1972–1975 – Le Avventure di Pinocchio (1972)
Barbetti, Cesare	1930 [2006]	1935–1945 – Il cappello a tre punte (1935) – Dagli Appennini alle Ande (1943)
Bellini, Gianfranco	1924 [2006]	1936-1937 – The Two Sergeants (1936) – Il signor Max (1937)
Blasi, Ilary	1981	1987–1989 – Da grande (1987) – The Sweet House of Horrors (1989)
Boccoli, Brigitta	1972	1982–1987 – Manhattan Baby (1982)
Bonansea, Miranda	1926 [2019]	1934–1942 – The Blind Woman of Sorrento (1934) – The Dream of Butterfly (1939)
Brown, Eleonora	1948	1960–1964 – La ciociara (1960)
Calenda, Carlo	1973	1984 – Cuore (1984)
Cantarini, Giorgio	1992	1997–2008 – La vita è bella (1997) – Gladiator (2000) – In Love and War (2001)
Capone, Claudio	1952 [2008]	1965-1969
Carrà, Raffaella	1943 [2021]	1952 – Tormento del passato (1952)
Cascio, Salvatore	1979	1988–1992 – Cinema Paradiso (1988) – Stanno tutti bene (1990)
Cerusico, Enzo	1937 [1991]	1948–1953 – Cuore (1948) – Altri tempi (1952)
Cervi, Valentina	1974	1984 – Portami la luna (1984)
Cesari, Federico	1997	2007-2014 – A Dinner for Them to Meet (2007) – The Youngest Son (2010) – The Dinner (2014)
Cestiè, Renato	1963	1970–1979 – San Michele aveva un gallo (1972) – L'ultima neve di primavera (1973)
Chevalier, Roberto	1952	1958-1970 – Young Husbands (1958) – The Vengeance of Ursus (1961)
De Ambrosis, Luciano	1937	1944–1950 – I bambini ci guardano (1944)
De Carolis, Cinzia	1960	1968–1976 – The Cat o' Nine Tails (1971) – The Night of the Devils (1972)
De Sica, Vittorio	1901 [1974]	1917 – The Clemenceau Affair (1917)
Delle Piane, Carlo	1936 [2019]	1948–1953 – Cuore (1948) – Guardie e ladri (1951)
Di Gennaro, Gianluca	1990	2004–2006 – Certi bambini (2004)
Febbi, Vittoria	1939	1949–1960 – Alarm Bells (1949) – Tragic Spell (1951) – Fury of the Pagans (1960)
Ferrari, Paolo	1929 [2018]	1938–1943 – Ettore Fieramosca (1938) – Gian Burrasca (1943)
Fioravanti, Giusva	1958	1967–1975 – La famiglia Benvenuti (1968-69)
Follina, Giulia	1950	1950–1968 – Familie Schölermann (1954–1960)
Frezza, Giovanni	1972	1980–1985 – Quella villa accanto al cimitero (1981) – I nuovi barbari (1982) – La casa con la scala nel buio (1983)
Gasparri, Franco	1948 [1999]	1961–1962 – Golia contro i giganti (1961) – Sansone (1961) – La furia di Ercole (1962)
Germano, Elio	1980	1993 – Ci hai rotto papà (1993)
Hill, Terence (Mario Girotti)	1939	1951–1957 – Vacanze col gangster (1951) – Voice of Silence (1953)
**Ielapi, Federico**	2010	2016–present – Quo Vado? (2016) – The King's Musketeers (2018) – Pinocchio (2019)
Interlenghi, Franco	1931 [2015]	1946 – Sciuscià (1946)
Leurini, Gino	1934 [2014]	1948–1951 – Wonderful Adventures of Guerrin Mescino (1952) – Domani è troppo tardi (1950) – Guardie e ladri (1951)
Locchi, Pino	1925 [1994]	1932–1942 – Il canale degli angeli (1934) – Il signore desidera? (1934) – Il re burlone (1935)
Luzi, Giulia	1994	2006–2011 – I Cesaroni (2006–2011)
Mastronardi, Alessandra	1986	1999–2001 – Il manoscritto di Van Hecken (1999)
Merli, Franco	1957	1974 – Il fiore delle mille e una notte (1974)
Meynier, Geronimo	1941 [2021]	1955–1957 – Amici per la pelle (1955) – Il Cocco di mama (1955) – Guendalina (1957)
Momo, Alessandro	1956 [1974]	1969–1974 – Malizia (1973) – Profumo di donna (1974)
Musy, Gianni (Gianni Glori)	1931 [2011]	1941–1943 – Oro nero (1942) – Harlem (1943)
Neri, Tommaso Maria	2001	2010–2017 – La solitudine dei numeri primi (2010)
Nicotra, Giancarlo	1944 [2013]	1950–1958 – Man, Beast and Virtue (1953)
Notari, Eduardo	1903 [1986]	1912–1921
Pacitto, Brando	1996	2006–2012 – The Holy Family (2006)
Quattrini, Paola	1944	1949–1961 – Tragic Spell (1951) – The White Angel (1955) – Hercules (1958)
Roveri, Ermanno	1903 [1968]	1912–1921 – Christus (1916) – Dagli Appennini alle Ande (1916)
Russo, Federico	1997	2004–2015 – I Cesaroni (2006–2012)
Santoro, Domenico	1958	1970–1973 – The Adventures of Pinocchio (1972)
Santostasi, Sara	1993	2000–2011 – Don Matteo (2004) – The Days of Abandonment (2005) – Donna Detective (2007-2010)
Sarno, Jacopo	1989	1996–2007 – Io e la mamma (1997-1998) – Fantozzi 2000 – La clonazione (1999)
Sikabonyi, Margot	1982	1994–2000 – Ho un segreto con papà (1994) – Un medico in famiglia (1998-2014)
Sperduti, Alessandro	1987	1998–2001 – Cristallo di Rocca: Una storia di Natale (1999) – Distretto di Polizia (2000–2001)
Staiola, Enzo	1939 [2025]	1948–1954 – Ladri di biciclette (1948) – Le retour de Don Camillo (1953)
Tedesco, Paola	1952	1964 – Il vangelo secondo Matteo (1964)
Torrisi, Paolo (Maurizio Torresan)	1951 [2005]	1961–1966
Vidale, Fabrizio	1970	1979-1987 – Io zombo, tu zombi, lei zomba (1979) – L'estate sta finendo (1987)
Zurzolo, Lorenzo	2000	2008-2018 – A Perfect Family (2012)
