= Claudia Pandolfi =

Italian actress (born 1974)

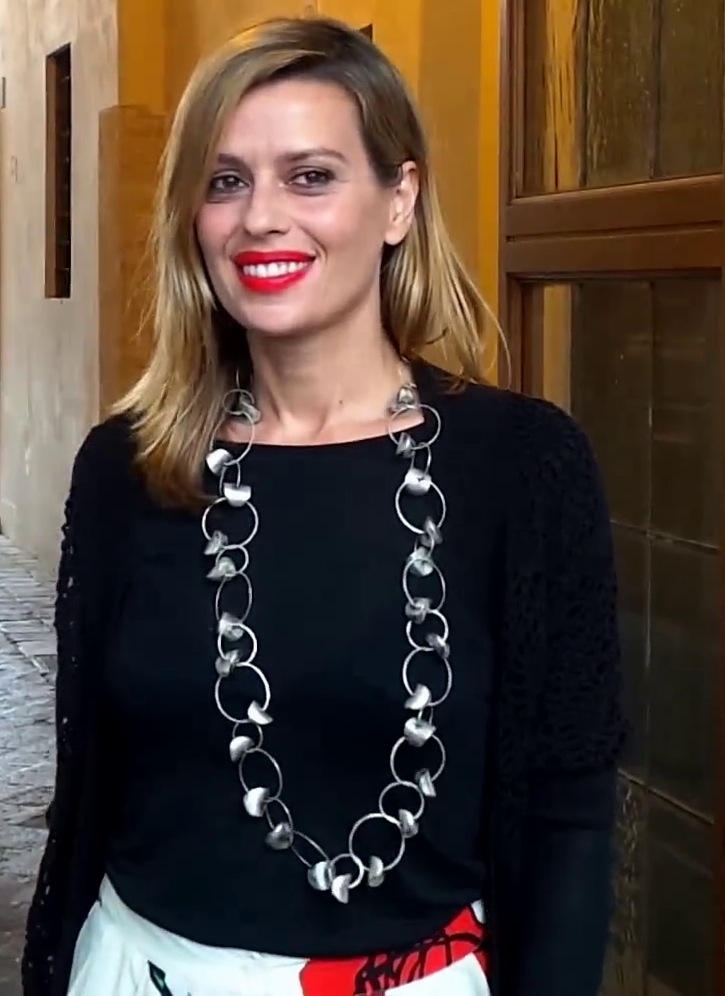
- Pandolfi in May 2015
- Born: 17 November 1974 (age 51); Rome, Italy
- Occupation: Actress
- Years active: 1991–present

Claudia Pandolfi (born 17 November 1974) is an Italian actress.

== Life and career ==
Claudia Pandolfi was born in Rome, the daughter of the CEO of the Laura Biagiotti Fashion House.

Her career began in 1991 on the stage of the Miss Italia beauty contest, in which she reached the semifinals, capturing the attention of Michele Placido who offered her the main role in the drama film Close Friends.

She reached a large popularity thanks to the television series Amico mio, Un medico in famiglia, Distretto di Polizia, and I liceali.

== Filmography ==
=== Film ===
| Year | Title | Role(s) | Notes |
|---|---|---|---|
| 1992 | Close Friends | Claudia | |
| 1994 | The Teddy Bear | Claudia Spinelli | |
| 1996 | The Border | Gabriella | Nominated Nastro d'Argento — Best Supporting Actress |
| 1997 | Naja | Bruna | |
| 1997 | Ovosodo | Susy Susini | |
| 1997 | Auguri professore | Luisa Corleto | |
| 1999 | Milonga | Scapuzzo | |
| 2003 | Sogni di gloria: La rivincita di Raf | Francesca | |
| 2004 | Working Slowly (Radio Alice) | Marta | |
| 2008 | Love, Soccer and Other Catastrophes | Silvia | |
| 2008 | Solo un padre | Melissa | |
| 2009 | The Ladies Get Their Say | Rossana | |
| 2010 | The First Beautiful Thing | Valeria Michelucci | Nominated David di Donatello — Best Supporting Actress |
| 2010 | Unlikely Revolutionaries | Marilù | |
| 2011 | When the Night | Marina Dolci | Bari International Film Festival — Best Lead Actress |
| 2012 | Sulla strada di casa | Simona | |
| 2012 | The Greatest of All | Sabrina Cenci | |
| 2013 | Meglio se stai zitta | Clo | Short film |
| 2015 | Uno anzi due | Suellen | |
| 2018 | La profezia dell'armadillo | Blanka's mother | |
| 2018 | Se son rose | Alessandra | |
| 2019 | Don't Stop Me Now | Tamara | |
| 2020 | È per il tuo bene | Alice | |
| 2021 | My Brother, My Sister | Tesla | |
| 2022 | Dry | Sara | |
| 2023 | The Worst Days | Tiziana | |
| 2024 | The Boy with Pink Pants | Teresa Manes | |
| 2025 | Madly | Alfa | |
| 2025 | Love in Separate Beds | Alessandra | |
| 2026 | Il bene comune | Samantha | |
| 2026 | Il rumore delle cose nuove | Viola | |
| 2026 | Un tranquillo funerale di famiglia | Daria | |
| 2026 | Hexed | Alice Doe | Italian dub |

=== Television ===
| Year | Title | Role(s) | Notes |
|---|---|---|---|
| 1991 | Miss Italia | Contestant | Annual beauty contest |
| 1993–1994 | Amico mio | Nurse Susanna Calabrò | Main role (season 1); 8 episodes |
| 1995 | La voce del cuore | Chiara | Miniseries |
| 1998–2000 | Un medico in famiglia | Alice Solari | Main role (seasons 1–2); 78 episodes Flaiano Prizes — Best Television Actress |
| 2000 | Come quando fuori piove | Wilma | Television film |
| 2001 | Piccolo mondo antico | Luisa Rigey | Miniseries |
| 2002 | Il sequestro Soffiantini | Agent Giulia Corrias | Miniseries |
| 2002–2010 | Distretto di Polizia | Giulia Corsi | Main role (seasons 3–10); 105 episodes |
| 2007 | Nassiryia - Per non dimenticare | Simona Berti | Miniseries |
| 2008 | Donne assassine | Manuela | Episode: "Chiara" |
| 2008–2009 | I liceali | Enrica Sabatini | Main role (seasons 1–2); 12 episodes |
| 2012–2014 | Il tredicesimo apostolo | Dr. Claudia Munari | Main role; 24 episodes |
| 2015–2018 | È arrivata la felicità | Angelica Camilli | Lead role; 48 episodes |
| 2016 | Romanzo siciliano | Emma La Torre | Main role; 8 episodes |
| 2018–2020 | Baby | Monica Petrelli Younes | Main role; 18 episodes |
| 2020 | Gli orologi del diavolo | Alessia | Miniseries |
| 2021–present | Un professore | Anita Ferro | Main role; 36 episodes |
| 2022–2024 | The Bad Guy | Luvi Bray | Main role (seasons 1–2); 12 episodes |
| 2023 | The Lions of Sicily | Duchess Spadafora | Recurring role; 4 episodes |
| 2023 | Noi siamo leggenda | Simona | Main role; 12 episodes |

== Awards and nominations ==
| Year | Award | Category | Work | Result | Ref. |
|---|---|---|---|---|---|
| Bari International Film Festival | 2012 | Best Lead Actress | Quando la notte | Won | |
| David di Donatello | 2011 | Best Supporting Actress | La prima cosa bella | Nominated | |
| David di Donatello | 2023 | Best Supporting Actress | Siccità | Nominated | |
| Nastro d'Argento | 1998 | Best Supporting Actress | La frontiera | Nominated | |
| Nastro d'Argento | 2010 | Best Supporting Actress | Cosmonauta | Nominated | |
| Nastro d'Argento | 2010 | Best Supporting Actress | La prima cosa bella | Nominated | |
| Nastro d'Argento | 2026 | Best Actress in a Comedy | Cosmonauta | Won | |
| Nastri d'Argento Grandi Serie | 2023 | Best Actress | The Bad Guy | Nominated | |
| Nastri d'Argento Grandi Serie | 2024 | Best Actress | Un professore | Nominated | |
| La pellicola d'oro | 2019 | Best Lead Actress | È arrivata la felicità | Won | |
| La pellicola d'oro | 2023 | Best Lead Actress in a TV Serie | The Bad Guy | Nominated | |
| Premio Flaiano | 1999 | Best Actress in Television | Un medico in famiglia | Won | |
