= Brando Pacitto =

Italian actor (born 1996)

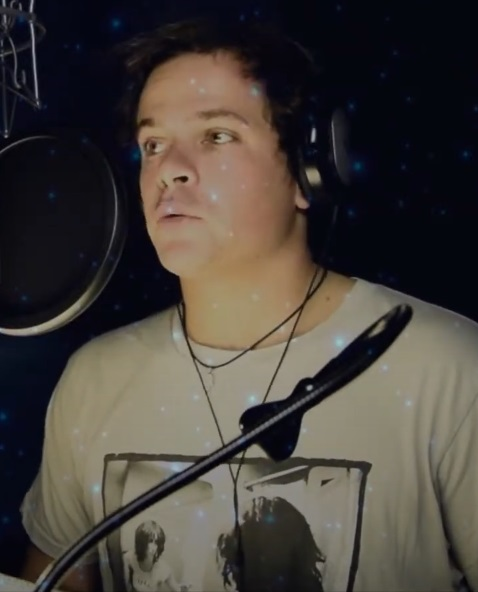
- Pacitto in 2019
- Born: 1 March 1996 (age 30); Rome, Italy
- Occupation: Actor
- Years active: 2006–present

Brando Pacitto (born 1 March 1996) is an Italian actor.

== Career ==
Pacitto started his acting career as a 4-year-old child, at the Clesis in Rome, and later entered the theatrical school by actor and playwright Thomas Otto Zinzi, with whom he still works today. In 2006 he played the role of baby Jesus in the TV series The Holy Family (La sacra famiglia), co-starring Ana Caterina Morariu (Mary) and Alessandro Gassmann (Joseph). In 2007 he starred Liberi di giocare by Francesco Miccichè, with Pierfrancesco Favino and Isabella Ferrari. He later portrayed Lorenzo in the television film Al di là del lago (2009) and in its sequel drama Al di là del lago (2010), both starring Kaspar Capparoni and Gioia Spaziani. He was in Dov'è mia figlia? (2011) by Monica Vullo, with Claudio Amendola and Serena Autieri, and in the two-episode film Walter Chiari – Fino all'ultima risata (2012) by Enzo Monteleone, with Alessio Boni and Bianca Guaccero, where he played the role of 15-year-old Simone Annichiarico. He took part in Rai 1 series Una buona stagione in 2013. Since the following year he's starring as Vale in highly rated TV drama Braccialetti rossi, also broadcast by Rai 1. In 2015 he was in Jovanotti's L'estate addosso music video and in the homonymous film by Gabriele Muccino, released in September 2016. In this year he has acted in Piuma, a film by Roan Johnson.

Pacitto is also a surfer, winning the Italian leg of the important competition Quicksilver King of the Groms in 2012.

== Filmography ==
Films
| Year | Title | Role | Notes |
|---|---|---|---|
| 2010 | Scontro di civiltà per un ascensore a Piazza Vittorio | Young Gladiator | |
| 2012 | The Day of the Siege: September Eleven 1683 | Young Marco D'Aviano | |
| 2016 | Summertime | Marco | |
| 2016 | Piuma | Patema | |
| 2018 | That's Life | Samuele "Sam" | |
| 2022 | The Turning Point | Ludovico | |
| 2022 | Padre Pio | Renato | |

Television
| Year | Title | Role | Notes |
|---|---|---|---|
| 2006 | The Holy Family | Jesus | Television film |
| 2007 | Liberi di giocare | Francesco | Television film |
| 2010–2011 | Al di là del lago | Lorenzo | 11 episodes |
| 2011 | Inspector Rex | Federico Miani | Episode: "Bravi ragazzi" |
| 2011 | Dov'è mia figlia? | Giorgio | 2 episodes |
| 2012 | Walter Chiari - Fino all'ultima risata | Young Simone | Television film |
| 2014 | A Good Season | Lorenzo "Picchio" Lana | 6 episodes |
| 2014–2016 | Braccialetti rossi | Valentino "Vale" Maggi | 17 episodes |
| 2018 | Medici | Antonio Meffei | 3 episodes |
| 2018–2020 | Baby | Fabio Fedeli | 18 episodes |

Music videos
| Year | Title | Artist(s) | Notes |
|---|---|---|---|
| 2013 | "Io non ho finito" | Niccolò Agliardi | |
| 2015 | "L'estate addosso" | Jovanotti | |
| 2015 | "Il bene si avvera" | Niccolò Agliardi | |
| 2015 | "Simili" | Laura Pausini | |
| 2016 | "Almeno tu" | Francesca Michielin | |
| 2020 | "Vertigine" | Levante feat. Altarboy | |
| 2021 | "Can't Help Falling in Love" | Michael Pitt | |

== Awards and nominations ==
- 2014 – Roma Fiction Fest: Premio speciale della giuria (Special Jury Prize) to the main cast of Braccialetti rossi (Carmine Buschini, Brando Pacitto, Aurora Ruffino, Mirko Trovato, Pio Luigi Piscicelli and Lorenzo Guidi).
