= Boccoli =

Boccoli is a surname. Notable people with the surname include:

- Benedicta Boccoli (born 1966), Italian theater and movie actress
- Brigitta Boccoli (born 1972), Italian film and television actress
- Gustavo Boccoli (born 1978), Brazilian-born Israeli footballer
