= Ludovica Martino =

Italian actress (born 1997)

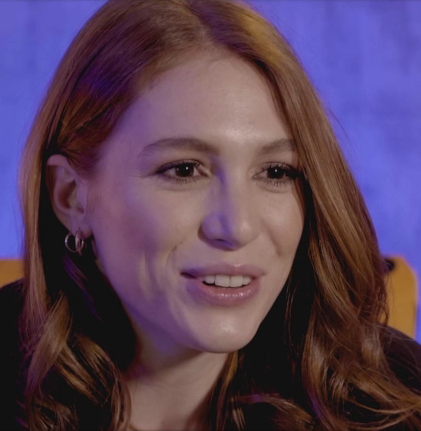
- Martino in 2022
- Born: 26 February 1997 (age 29); Rome, Italy
- Education: Sapienza University of Rome
- Occupation: Actress
- Years active: 2015–present

Ludovica Martino (Italian pronunciation: [lu.doˈvi.ka marˈti.no]; born 26 February 1997) is an Italian actress. She is best known for her roles in the teen drama television series Skam Italia (2018–2024) and the Netflix comedy drama films Under the Riccione Sun (2020) and Under the Amalfi Sun (2022).

== Biography ==
Martino was born in Rome, the eldest of two children; she has a younger brother, Tommaso. Her passion for acting began at a young age when she attended acting classes and put on plays for her family at Christmastime. She attended a liceo classico and graduated with honors from the Sapienza University of Rome with a degree in translating and interpreting. In addition to Italian, she also speaks English, Spanish, and Russian. In 2023, she was a guest speaker at the Riviera International Film Festival.

== Filmography ==
=== Film ===
| Year | Title | Role | Ref. |
|---|---|---|---|
| 2019 | The Champion | Alessia | |
| 2020 | Under the Riccione Sun | Camilla | |
| 2021 | Security | Angela Raffaelli Santini | |
| 2021 | Lovely Boy | Nic's Girlfriend | |
| 2021 | My Brother, My Sister | Carolina | |
| 2021 | The Turning Point | Rebecca | |
| 2022 | A Breath of Fresh Air | Emma | |
| 2022 | Under the Amalfi Sun | Camilla | |
| 2023 | The Best Days | Carolina | |
| 2023 | Resvrgis | Sara | |
| 2024 | My Place Is Here | Marta | |
| 2025 | Come fratelli | Noël | |

=== Television ===
| Year | Title | Role | Notes | Ref. |
|---|---|---|---|---|
| 2015–2018 | Tutto può succedere | Emilia | 55 episodes | |
| 2017 | Che Dio ci aiuti | Serena | 2 episodes | |
| 2018–2024 | Skam Italia | Eva Brighi | 44 episodes | |
| 2019 | Passeggeri notturni | Matilde | 1 episode | |
| 2019 | Liberi tutti | Chiara | 12 episodes | |
| 2021 | Carosello Carosone | Italia Levidi | Television film | |
| 2021 | Luna Park | Stella | 6 episodes | |
| 2023 | Yolo | Laura | Miniseries; 6 episodes | |
| 2023 | Vita da Carlo | Ludovica | 4 episodes | |
| 2024 | Marconi | Isabella Gordon | 2 episodes | |
| 2025 | Carosello in love | Laura | Television film | |

=== Music videos ===
| Year | Title | Artist | Ref. |
|---|---|---|---|
| 2020 | "22 settembre" | Ultimo | |

== Awards and nominations ==
| Award | Year | Category | Nominated work | Result | Ref. |
|---|---|---|---|---|---|
| Bari International Film Festival | 2024 | Best Actress | My Place Is Here | Won | |
| Nastri D'Argento Grandi Serie | 2021 | Wella Award | Skam Italia | Won | |
| Nastri D'Argento Grandi Serie | 2024 | Best Supporting Actress | Vita da Carlo | Nominated | |
