= My Place Is Here =

2024 Italian film by Cristiano Bortone and Daniela Porto

- Italian theatrical release poster
- Italian: Il mio posto è qui
- Directed by: Cristiano Bortone; Daniela Porto
- Written by: Cristiano Bortone; Daniela Porto
- Based on: Il mio posto è qui by Daniela Porto
- Starring: Ludovica Martino; Marco Leonardi
- Cinematography: Emilio Maria Costa
- Edited by: Claudio Di Mauro
- Music by: Santi Pulvirenti
- Production companies: Orisa Produzioni; Goldkind Film
- Distributed by: Adler Entertainment; Beta Cinema
- Release dates: 23 March 2024 (Bari); 9 May 2024 (Italy)
- Running time: 110 minutes
- Country: Italy
- Language: Italian

My Place Is Here (Italian: Il mio posto è qui) is a 2024 Italian drama film written and directed by Cristiano Bortone and Daniela Porto, based on the novel of the same name by Porto. It premiered at the Bari International Film Festival on 23 March 2024 and received a theatrical release in Italy on 9 May 2024.

== Premise ==
In a rural village in Calabria in the 1940s, Marta, a young single mother forced into marrying a man she does not love, meets Lorenzo, a wedding planner and the only gay man in their town. Their friendship will lead Marta to reexamine the prejudices of their traditional community and seek her own place in the world as a woman.

== Cast ==
- Ludovica Martino as Marta
- Marco Leonardi as Lorenzo
- Anna Maria De Luca as Dora
- Biancamaria D'Amato as Marta's mother
- Francesco Biscione as Marta's father
- Adele Bilotta as Marta's sister
- Antonino Sgrò as Gino
- Giorgia Arena as Bianca
- Francesco Aiello as Enrico
- Francesco Aricò as Michele
- Annamaria De Luca as Dora
- Ivan Artuso as Amedeo
- Gianvincenzo Pugliese as Francesco
- Saverio Malara as Don Antonio

== Production ==
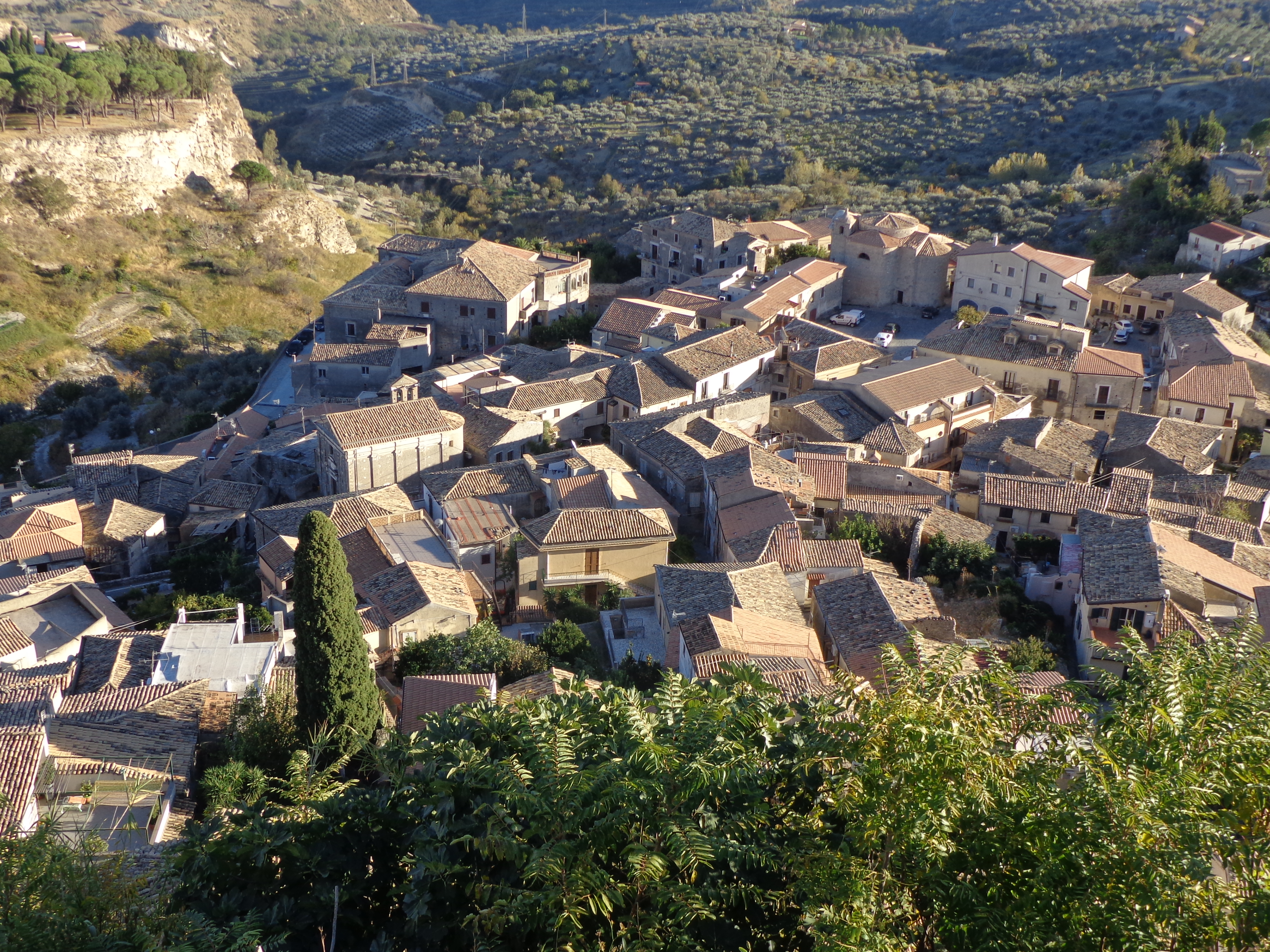
The film was shot in the town of Gerace.

Writer-director Daniela Porto, who was born to Calabrian parents, was inspired to write the film after learning about an openly gay man in her parents' village who helped women plan their weddings. Filming took place in Gerace, Reggio Calabria, as well as Fasano and Gioia del Colle in Apulia.

The film is shot in a little town in Calabria called Gerace, which really is quite untouched and we were fascinated by the tonalities there, and we tried to create this world in which there was not a lot of color, and somehow everything was into the mud and earth and stone kind of tonality, including the clothes, because if you look at the pictures of the time, you don’t see these sparkling happy flowery colors that come later. Then everything was very brownish. The people were farmers; they were workers.

— Cristiano Bortone

== Release ==
Beta Cinema acquired international sales rights to the film in February 2024. The trailer was released on 15 March 2024.

== Reception ==
=== Critical response ===
Carola Proto of Comingsoon.it gave the film three-and-a-half out of five stars and commended the performances of Ludovica Martino and Marco Leonardi. Giulia Lucchini of Cinematografo compared the film to There's Still Tomorrow and wrote, "This story of female emancipation and the fight against prejudice, despite some small stumbles, is ultimately convincing."

=== Awards and nominations ===
Year	Award	Category	Nominee	Result	Ref.
2024	Bari International Film Festival	Best Director	Cristiano Bortone and Daniela Porto	Won	
2024	Bari International Film Festival	Best Actress	Ludovica Martino	Won	
2024	Nastro d'Argento	Premio Nuovo Imaie	Ludovica Martino	Won	
2024	Nastro d'Argento	Premio Nuovo Imaie	Marco Leonardi	Won	
