= My Brother, My Sister =

2021 Italian film

- Italian: Mio fratello mia sorella
- Directed by: Roberto Capucci
- Written by: Roberto Capucci
- Produced by: Marco Belardi; Ughetta Curto; Enrico Venti
- Starring: Alessandro Preziosi; Claudia Pandolfi; Ludovica Martino; Francesco Cavallo
- Cinematography: Andrea Arnone
- Edited by: Francesco Galli
- Music by: Valerio Calisse
- Production companies: Lotus Production; Mediaset
- Release date: 8 October 2021
- Running time: 110 minutes
- Country: Italy
- Language: Italian

My Brother, My Sister (Italian: Mio fratello, mia sorella) is a 2021 Italian drama film directed and written by Roberto Capucci and starring Alessandro Preziosi and Claudia Pandolfi. Netflix released the film for streaming on 8 October 2021.

== Synopsis ==
Siblings Nik (Alessandro Preziosi) and Tesla (Claudia Pandolfi) are forced to live together in their father's house according to his will after his demise. There they will try to overcome their differences and become a family.

== Cast ==
- Alessandro Preziosi as Nikola "Nik"
- Claudia Pandolfi as Tesla
- Ludovica Martino as Carolina
- Francesco Cavallo as Sebastiano
- Stella Egitto as Emma
- Caterina Murino as Giada
- Frank Gerrish as Federico
