= The Turning Point (2022 film) =

- Italian: La svolta
- Directed by: Riccardo Antonaroli
- Written by: Roberto Cimpanelli; Gabriele Scarfone
- Starring: Andrea Lattanzi; Brando Pacitto; Ludovica Martino
- Release date: 20 April 2022
- Running time: 90 minutes
- Country: Italy
- Language: Italian

The Turning Point (Italian: La svolta) is a 2022 Italian drama film directed by Riccardo Antonaroli, written by Roberto Cimpanelli and Gabriele Scarfone and starring Andrea Lattanzi, Brando Pacitto, and Ludovica Martino.

== Cast ==
- Andrea Lattanzi
- Brando Pacitto
- Ludovica Martino
- Chabeli Sastre
- Claudio Bigagli
- Marcello Fonte
- Cristian Di Sante
- Tullio Sorrentino
- Filippo Contri
- Max Malatesta
