= Melania Dalla Costa =

Italian actress (born 1988)

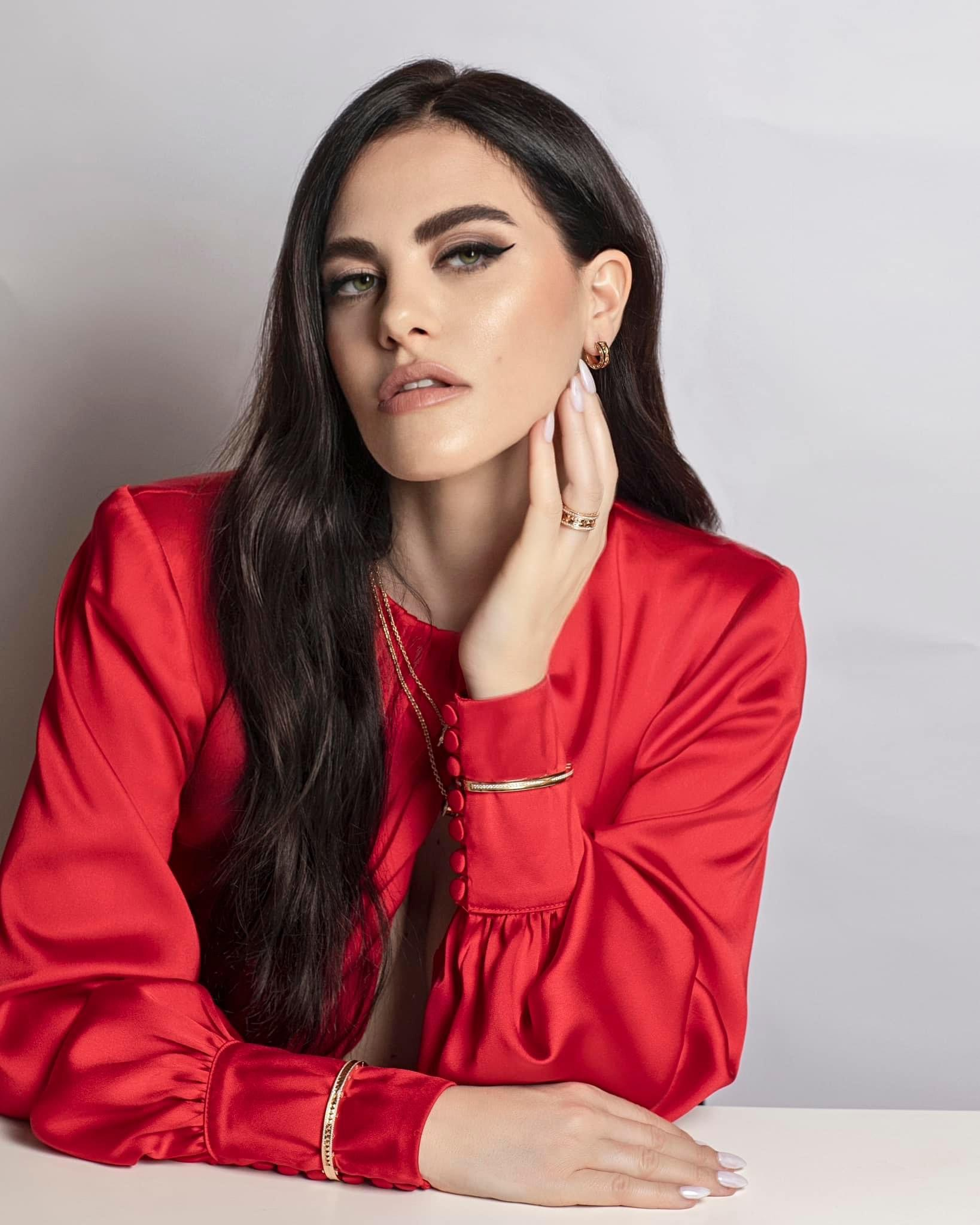
- Dalla Costa in 2024
- Born: February 25, 1988 (age 38); Marostica, Province of Vicenza, Italy
- Occupations: Actress, screenwriter, film producer, activist
- Years active: 2010–present
- Notable work: Stato di ebbrezza (2018), I sogni sospesi (2018)
- Awards: Montecatini International Short Film Festival – Best Production (2019)
- Website: www.melaniadallacosta.it

Melania Dalla Costa (born 25 February 1988) is an Italian actress, screenwriter, film producer, and activist.

== Biography ==
Melania Dalla Costa was born in Marostica, Province of Vicenza, on 25 February 1988. A former athlete, she practised cross-country skiing competitively for ten years.

She was the creative producer of Magic Fair, a global sales and production company based in the United States, Italy, and France.

She began her artistic training in 2011 at Elf Teatro (Raul Manso), continued in 2012 at Spazio Gedeone (Paolo Olgiati). In 2013 she studied acting and diction at Centro Teatro Attivo (Nicoletta Ramorino). In 2014 she trained at Conservatorio Teatrale Diotaiuti (Giovanni Battista Diotaiuti), and from 2015 to 2018 with Ivana Chubbuck, Bernard Hiller and Michael Margotta. Between 2024 and 2025 she began screen-combat (stunt) training for actors.

Between 2018 and 2019, the press referred to her as “the muse of Giovanni Gastel”; she was the sole subject of his exhibition Cattura, displayed in Milan on Via della Spiga. In 2019 she was testimonial for the United Nations UNICRI campaign against violence against women.

In 2020 she appeared in Dream Ladies with Lily Collins, Fan Bingbing, Alice Braga, Enikő Mihalik, Leomie Anderson and Róisín Murphy.

Grazia Arabia featured her among the international women who inspire the magazine.

In 2021 she appeared on the January cover of Harper’s Bazaar Serbia and on the April covers of Glamour Mexico and Glamour Latin America. The same year she was testimonial for the Mille Miglia.

In 2022 she appeared on the July cover of Harper’s Bazaar Bulgaria. That December she became the global face of the Maserati Grecale Modena campaign, distributed by Condé Nast International across British Vogue, Vogue America, Vogue Singapore, Vogue Philippines, Vogue Korea, British GQ, GQ US, GQ Italy, GQ Germany, GQ China, GQ Taiwan and GQ Japan.

She was godmother of the Venice Carnival 2023. Since January 2023 she has been part of the “Bvlgari Family,” following a collaboration that began in 2018. Since 2024 she has collaborated with Christian Dior.

On 25 January 2025, she was invited by fashion designer Sabyasachi Mukherjee to Mumbai for his 25th-anniversary show; the event was covered by The Times of India.

== Actress ==
Her breakthrough came in 2014 with the TV drama Un posto al sole, playing Francesca.

In 2015 she acted in the fashion short film Only When I’m Alone I Find Myself and I Often Check If I’m Lost, wearing Antonio Marras’s Spring/Summer 2015 collection.

From 2016 to 2020 she worked in both film and television (Immaturi, by Rolando Ravello).

She co-starred with Francesca Inaudi in Stato di ebbrezza, released on 24 May 2018 and presented at the Cannes Film Festival, playing Beatrice, a drug-addicted and suicidal woman.

On 16 October 2025 she appeared with James Franco in the international feature Squali, directed by Daniele Barbiero, playing Valeria.

== Screenwriter ==
She debuted as a screenwriter in 2018 with I sogni sospesi. The film deals with the traumatic past of a woman victim of sexual abuse.

Her subsequent works include: Thebes, La Lupa, Medusa, The Golden Blood, The Northern Star, Bonecrackers and The Magnificent Rebels of Venice.

== Activism ==
In addition to charity work in Italy and other countries, in 2018 she wrote, produced and starred in I sogni sospesi, presented at the Venice International Film Festival.

An activist for women’s rights, she was testimonial in 2019 for the UNICRI campaign against violence against women.

In 2021 Marie Claire (Spain) selected her—with Eva Longoria, Alicia Keys and Isabeli Fontana—for Mujeres Empoderadas.

On 8 March 2023 she helped realise an artwork by Liu Bolin dedicated to Iranian women, involving activist Nasibe Shamsaei.

== Filmography ==
=== Film ===
- Secondo tempo (2010), dir. Fabio Bastianello
- Only When I’m Alone I Find Myself and I Often Check If I’m Lost (2015), dir. Silvia Morani
- Cotton Prince (2016), dir. Hasan Tolga Pulat
- Stato di ebbrezza (2017), dir. Luca Biglione
- Three (2017), dir. Alberto Bambini — Best Horror, Los Angeles Film Awards 2020
- I sogni sospesi (2018), dir. Manuela Tempesta
- Chanel Beauty (2019), dir. Francesco Montefusco
- Gli ultimi resti (2020), dir. Irene Cacciarini
- La seconda via (2022), dir. Alessandro Garilli
- Squali (2025), dir. Daniele Barbiero

=== Television ===
- Radio Sex (2007), dir. Alessandro Baracco
- Natale (2008), dir. Maccio Capatonda
- Babbala (2012, ep. 5), dir. Maccio Capatonda
- Un posto al sole (2014/2015), various directors
- Immaturi (2016), dir. Rolando Ravello

== Advertising ==
- Christian Dior (2024/2025)
- Bvlgari (2023)
- Maserati — Global campaign (2022/2023)
- Chanel (2019)

== Awards ==
- Montecatini International Short Film Festival — Best Production (2019)
- REFF — Golden Wolf, Best Actress (2019)
- New York Film Award — Best Actress (2020); nomination (2021)
- Venice Film Festival — Youngers in Movie (2020)
- Hollywood Gold Awards — Best Actress nomination for I sogni sospesi (2021)
- Vegas Movie Awards — Best Actress for I sogni sospesi (2021)
- Indie Short Fest — Best Actress nomination for I sogni sospesi (2021)
- Independent Shorts Awards — Best Actress for I sogni sospesi (2021)
- 25th Magna Grecia Awards — Actress (2022)
