= The Best Day of My Life =

- Directed by: Cristina Comencini
- Written by: Giulia Calenda; Cristina Comencini; Lucilla Schiaffino
- Produced by: Marco Chimenz; Giovanni Stabilini; Riccardo Tozzi
- Starring: Virna Lisi; Margherita Buy; Sandra Ceccarelli; Luigi Lo Cascio
- Cinematography: Fabio Cianchetti
- Edited by: Cecilia Zanuso
- Music by: Franco Piersanti
- Distributed by: 01 Distribuzione
- Release date: 12 April 2002
- Running time: 102 minutes
- Country: Italy
- Language: Italian

The Best Day of My Life (Italian: Il più bel giorno della mia vita) is a 2002 award-winning Italian drama film directed by Cristina Comencini.

== Plot ==
The Best Day of My Life is the story of a dysfunctional family as seen through the eyes of young Chiara (Maria Luisa De Crescenzo) who is about to receive her first communion. The family includes matriarch Irene (Virna Lisi) and her three grown up children.

== Cast ==
- Virna Lisi as Irene
- Margherita Buy as Sara
- Sandra Ceccarelli as Rita
- Luigi Lo Cascio as Claudio
- Marco Baliani as Carlo
- Marco Quaglia as Luca
- Jean-Hugues Anglade as Davide
- Ricky Tognazzi as Sandro Berardi
- Gaia Conforzi as Cecilia
- Francesco Scianna as Marco
- Francesca Perini as Silvia
- Maria Luisa De Crescenzo as Chiara
- Andrea Sama as Cammello
- Giulio Squillacciotti as Che

== Awards ==
- 2002: Grand Prix des Amériques at the Montréal World Film Festival
- 2002: Silver Ribbon for Best Screenplay and Best Supporting Actress from the Italian National Syndicate of Film Journalists
- 2003: Grand Prix at the Créteil International Women's Film Festival
