= Giancarlo Chiaramello =

Italian composer, conductor and arranger

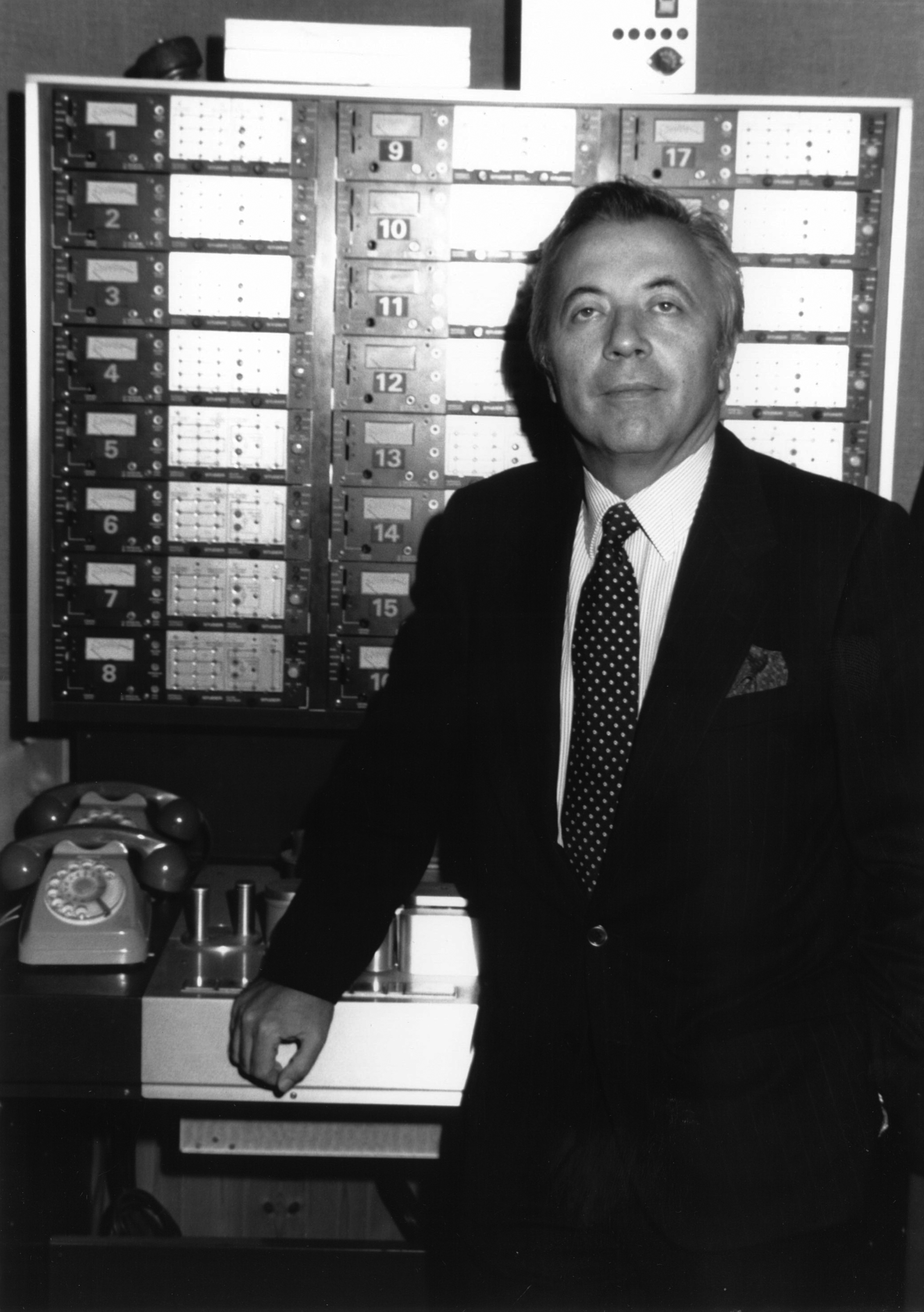
Giancarlo Chiaramello 1985

Giancarlo Chiaramello (born 18 February 1939) is an Italian composer, conductor and arranger.

Born in Bra, in 1958 Chiaramello graduated from the Turin Conservatory where he studied piano, composition and vocal polyphony. He won two international competitions for young composers, the Francesco Ballo Prize in 1960 and the Ranieri of Monaco Award in 1962. Between sixties and seventies he was arranger for several pop and rock artists, and composed scores for many stage plays. Chiaramello has also scored television series as well as several films, including Number One (1973), Crazy Joe (1974), An Average Little Man (1977), Prickly Pears (1981) and Mani di fata (1983). in 1975 he won the Nastro d'Argento for Best Score for Luca Ronconi 's Orlando Furioso.
