= Baby (Italian TV series) =

Italian television series

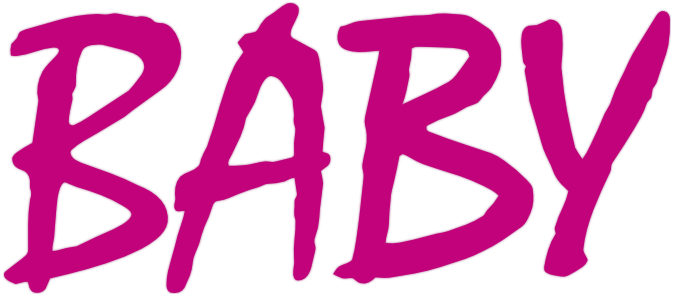
- Genre: Teen drama
- Created by: Antonio Le Fosse; Giacomo Mazzariol; Marco Raspanti; Romolo Re Salvador; Eleonora Trucchi
- Written by: Isabella Aguilar; Giacomo Durzi
- Directed by: Andrea De Sica; Anna Negri
- Starring: Benedetta Porcaroli; Alice Pagani; Riccardo Mandolini; Chabeli Sastre Gonzalez; Brando Pacitto; Lorenzo Zurzolo; Galatea Ranzi; Tommaso Ragno; Massimo Poggio; Mehdi Nebbou; Giuseppe Maggio; Mirko Trovato; Federica Lucaferri; Beatrice Bartoni; Isabella Ferrari; Claudia Pandolfi
- Country of origin: Italy
- Original language: Italian
- No. of seasons: 3
- No. of episodes: 18

Production
- Executive producers: Marco De Angelis; Nicola De Angelis
- Producers: Marco De Angelis; Nicola De Angelis
- Cinematography: Stefano Falivene
- Running time: 40–51 minutes
- Production company: Fabula Pictures

Original release
- Network: Netflix
- Release: 30 November 2018 – 16 September 2020

Baby is an Italian teen drama television series created for Netflix. The first season debuted on 30 November 2018. The series follows students at an elite high school in Rome who are involved in sex work. It is loosely based on the story of two high school girls in Rome involved in an underage sex work ring (the "Baby Squillo" scandal) in 2014.

In December 2018, Netflix announced a second season of the series, which premiered on 18 October 2019. The series was renewed for a third and final season, which was released on 16 September 2020.

== Synopsis ==
Inspired by the Baby Squillo scandal in 2013, the plot develops in an elite high school in Rome. Baby follows Chiara Altieri, a rich and beautiful girl who is disillusioned with her privileged life. She soon meets Ludovica Storti, an impulsive girl who's secretly in need of money. Ludovica soon draws Chiara into the world of underage prostitution. Ludovica becomes involved with Fiore, a dangerous man. Meanwhile, Chiara pursues a relationship with Damiano, a new student and the son of an ambassador, while hiding her secret life.

== Cast and characters ==
=== Main ===
- Benedetta Porcaroli as Chiara Altieri. A wealthy high school girl who lives a double life.
- Alice Pagani as Ludovica Storti. A loner high school girl who meets Chiara and introduces her to the world of prostitution.
- Riccardo Mandolini as Damiano Younes. A troubled boy who becomes Chiara’s boyfriend.
- Chabeli Sastre Gonzales as Camilla Rossi. Chiara and Fabio's best friend and Niccolò's sister.
- Lorenzo Zurzolo as Niccolò Rossi. Virginia's boyfriend and Camilla's brother. Prior to the show, he was in a secret relationship with Chiara.
- Brando Pacitto as Fabio Fedeli. Chiara and Camilla's best friend who is also the principal's son.
- Galatea Ranzi as Elsa Altieri-Della Rocca. Chiara's mother.
- Tommaso Ragno as Principal Alberto Fedeli. Fabio's father and the principal of Collodi Institute. He starts a relationship with Simonetta.
- Massimo Poggio as Arturo Altieri. Chiara's father and Elsa's adulterer husband.
- Mehdi Nebbou as Khalid Younes. A diplomat and Damiano's father.
- Giuseppe Maggio as Claudio "Fiore" Fiorenzi. Chiara and Ludovica's pimp with an obsession for Ludovica.
- Mirko Trovato as Brando De Sanctis. A high school student struggling with the acceptance of his homosexuality.
- Isabella Ferrari as Simonetta Loreti. Ludovica's mother and Fedeli's lover. In the second season she realises that her daughter is a prostitute.
- Claudia Pandolfi as Monica Younes-Petrelli. Khalid's wife, Damiano's stepmother and gym teacher at Collodi. She has an affair with Niccolò, one of her students.
- Paolo Calabresi as Saverio (season 1). Fiore's cousin and boss. He is involved in the world of prostitution.
- Max Tortora as Roberto De Sanctis (season 2-3). Brando's homophobic father.
- Denise Capezza as Natalia (season 2-3). A prostitute and Fiore's partner in crime
- Thomas Trabacchi as Tommaso Regoli (season 2; guest season 3). Client of Ludovica who is also her history teacher.
- Antonio Orlando as Inspector Diego Comini (season 3). The inspector of the child prostitution case.
- Anna Lou Castoldi as Aurora (season 3). Damiano's new girlfriend.

=== Recurring ===
- Federica Lucaferri as Virginia. Niccolo's girlfriend who fakes a pregnancy to manipulate him.
- Beatrice Bartoni as Vanessa (season 1-2). Damiano's ex girlfriend.
- Marjo Berasategui as Rocio Govender-Rossi (season 1). Niccolò and Camilla's mother.
- Luciano Scarpa as Mario Rossi (season 1-2). Niccolò and Camilla's father.
- Andrea Giordana as Mr. Della Rocca (season 1; guest season 3). Elsa's father.
- Edoardo Purgatori as Lele (season 1). Simonetta's lover.
- Davide Argenti as Falco (season 1). A drug dealer involved with Damiano.
- Mario Cordova as Filippo Storti (season 1). Ludovica's manipulative father.
- Marta Jacquier as Francesca Storti (season 1). Ludovica's sister.
- Sebastiano Colla as Manuel Ghini (season 1-2). A man involved in the world of child prostitution.
- Sergio Ruggeri as Vittorio (season 2-3). A high school student and Niccolò's friend.
- Filippo Marisli as Carlo (season 2-3). A high school student and Niccolò's friend.
- Ludovico Succio as Alessandro (season 2-3). A journalist and Fabio's boyfriend.
- Lorenzo Gleijeses as Martino (season 2). One of Natalia's clients who starts stalking her.
- Massimo De Santis as Al Pacini (season 2-3). A private investigator hired by Khalid.
- Alessia Scriboni as Sofia Mancini (season 2-3). A high school girl who works as a prostitute and befriends Chiara.
- Clotilde Sabatino as Luisa De Sanctis (season 2-3). Roberto's wife and Brando and Perla's mother.
- Silvia Pisano as Perla De Sanctis (season 2-3). Brando's sister.
- Francesca Nunzi as Matilde (season 2). Regoli's wife.
- Emanuele Basso as Pietro (season 2). A politician and one of Chiara's clients.
- Bruno Wolkowitch as Christophe (season 3). A French client.
- Chiara Caselli as Angela (season 3). Chiara's lawyer during the child prostitution lawsuit.
- Mattia Sbragia as Rector (season 3). Collodi's rector who fires Fedeli.

== Episodes ==
Series	Episodes	Originally released
1	6	30 November 2018
2	6	18 October 2019
3	6	16 September 2020

=== Season 1 (2018) ===
No. overall	No. in season	Title	Directed by	Written by	Original release date
1	1	"Superpowers" (Italian: "Superpoteri")	Andrea De Sica	Isabella Aguilar	30 November 2018
At an exclusive private high school, student athlete Chiara forges an unlikely bond with rebellious classmate Ludovica and mysterious new boy Damiano.
2	2	"Puppet" (Italian: "Burattino")	Andrea De Sica	Giacomo Durzi	30 November 2018
Chiara gets a peace offering from her dad. Camilla makes an offhand comment that impacts Chiara's love life. Ludo suffers a blow at a family event.
3	3	"#Friendzone"	Andrea De Sica	Grams	30 November 2018
Chiara begs Camilla for a chance to explain things, Nico and Brando plot against Damiano, and Fiore offers Ludo a solution to her money troubles.
4	4	"Emma"	Anna Negri	Grams	30 November 2018
Saverio introduces Ludo to an admirer who saw her at the club. Fabio helps Damiano out of a bind. A run-in at a party leads Chiara to act recklessly.
5	5	"The Last Shot" (Italian: "L'ultimo scatto")	Anna Negri	Grams	30 November 2018
Ludo gets infuriating news, Chiara and her parents start therapy, and Saverio invites the girls to a secret party, where a familiar face shows up.
6	6	"#Love"	Andrea De Sica	Isabella Aguilar, Giacomo Durzi and Grams	30 November 2018
In the aftermath, Ludo, Damiano and Chiara try to cover their tracks and grapple with feelings of guilt and fear. Fabio savors a life-changing moment.

=== Season 2 (2019) ===
No. overall	No. in season	Title	Directed by	Written by	Original release date
7	1	"#justagame"	Andrea De Sica	Grams	18 October 2019
As a new school year begins, Chiara helps Ludo deal with a troublesome client, and Damiano takes on another job to pay down his debt to Fiore.
8	2	"The Offer" (Italian: "Rilancio")	Andrea De Sica	Grams	18 October 2019
Fiore surprises Chiara at school and takes her on a drive. Ludo locks horns with her new teacher. Damiano's late-night exploits leave him drained.
9	3	"Ghosts" (Italian: "Fantasmi")	Letizia Lamartire	Grams	18 October 2019
Nagging suspicions drive a wedge between Chiara and Damiano. Brando is forced to choose sides when Nico and the others attack Fabio at school.
10	4	"Truth or Dare" (Italian: "Obbligo o verità")	Letizia Lamartire	Grams	18 October 2019
While a shell-shocked Chiara braces for fallout from the incident at Marge, Brando scrambles to shore up his tough-guy image — at school and at home.
11	5	"Dead End" (Italian: "Vicolo cieco")	Andrea De Sica	Grams	18 October 2019
Ludo's mother drops a bombshell, Damiano tries to make sense of Chiara's sudden change of heart, and Chiara meets Brando's family.
12	6	"Baby"	Andrea De Sica	Grams	18 October 2019
As Brando's latest video sends shock waves through Collodi, Chiara plots her revenge, and Ludo seeks refuge from her stalker.

=== Season 3 (2020) ===
No. overall	No. in season	Title	Directed by	Written by	Original release date
13	1	"Valentine's Day" (Italian: "San Valentino")	Andrea De Sica	Grams	16 September 2020
After an acquaintance is caught in a police raid, Chiara and Ludo worry for their safety; a private investigator offers a deal to Damiano.
14	2	"April 26th, 1915" (Italian: "26 aprile 1915")	Letizia Lamartire	Grams	16 September 2020
A story on a gossip site causes rumours to swirl at Collodi and prompts Ludo to make big changes; Damiano sneaks a camera into Fiore's apartment.
15	3	"Make a Wish" (Italian: "Esprimi un desiderio")	Antonio Le Fosse	Grams	16 September 2020
On the eve of her 18th birthday, Ludo accepts a challenge from Virginia; Chiara faces one upsetting surprise after another.
16	4	"No More Secrets" (Italian: "Niente più segreti")	Letizia Lamartire	Grams	16 September 2020
As her life unravels, Ludo makes a desperate move; a TV interview puts Chiara in a difficult position; Damiano opens up to Aurora.
17	5	"100 Days" (Italian: "100 giorni")	Letizia Lamartire	Grams	16 September 2020
Chiara deals with the fallout from her post; Ludo searches for an escape; Damiano seeks advice from Monica; Brando confronts his father.
18	6	"Beyond the Aquarium" (Italian: "Oltre l'acquario")	Letizia Lamartire	Grams	16 September 2020
As the case goes to trial, Chiara and Ludo weigh their options and search Rome for the one person who could help bring Fiore to justice.
