= Under the Riccione Sun =

2020 film

- Italian Netflix poster
- Italian: Sotto il sole di Riccione
- Directed by: YouNuts!
- Written by: Enrico Vanzina; Caterina Salvadori; Ciro Zecca
- Starring: Cristiano Caccamo; Davide Calgaro; Matteo Oscar Giuggioli; Ludovica Martino; Saul Nanni; Fotinì Peluso; Claudia Tranchese; Lorenzo Zurzolo; Isabella Ferrari
- Music by: Tommaso Paradiso
- Production companies: Lucky Red; Mediaset; New International
- Distributed by: Netflix
- Release date: 1 July 2020
- Running time: 101 minutes
- Country: Italy
- Language: Italian

Under the Riccione Sun (Italian: Sotto il sole di Riccione) is a 2020 Italian comedy-drama film directed by YouNuts! and written by Caterina Salvadori and Enrico Vanzina. It stars Cristiano Caccamo, Ludovica Martino, Lorenzo Zurzolo and Isabella Ferrari, and it is set in Riccione, Emilia-Romagna. The film was released on 1 July 2020.

The film was followed by Under the Amalfi Sun, released on 13 July 2022.

== Cast ==
- Cristiano Caccamo as Ciro
- Davide Calgaro as Furio
- Matteo Oscar Giuggioli as Tommy
- Ludovica Martino as Camilla
- Saul Nanni as Marco
- Fotinì Peluso as Guenda
- Claudia Tranchese as Emma
- Lorenzo Zurzolo as Vincenzo
- Giulia Schiavo as Mara
- Maria Luisa De Crescenzo as Bea
- Sergio Ruggeri as Giorgio
- Rosanna Sapia as Violante
- Luca Ward as Lucio
- Andrea Roncato as Gualtiero
- Isabella Ferrari as Irene
- Tommaso Paradiso as himself
