= Al di là del lago =

Italian television series

- Genre: Drama; Thriller
- Written by: Roberta Colombo
- Directed by: Raffaele Mertes; Daniele Falleri (second Unit); Massimo Zeri (Director of Photogrtaphy-Pilot Episode)
- Starring: Kaspar Capparoni; Roberto Farnesi; Gioia Spaziani; Brando Pacitto; Martina Colombari; Fabio Testi
- Music by: Massimiliano Lazzaretti; Stefano Reali
- Country of origin: Italy
- Original language: Italian
- No. of seasons: 1
- No. of episodes: 12

Production
- Producers: Lorraine De Selle; Micol Pallucca; Gian Paolo Varani
- Running time: 50 min (episode)
- Production company: Fidia Film

Original release
- Network: Canale 5
- Release: 30 December 2010 – 27 January 2011

Al di là del lago ("Beyond the Lake") is an Italian thriller-drama television series broadcast from 30 December 2010, on Canale 5. The series, consisting of 11 episodes, is directed by Raffaele Mertes and stars Kaspar Capparoni, Gioia Spaziani, Roberto Farnesi. Previously, on 22 April 2009, also on Canale 5, a film of the same name for television had been broadcast, with the same protagonists.

== Plot and places ==
The series takes place on the shores of a lake (hence the title) and is about love, intrigue and passion. In the first episodes there is a loss for Valerio and a return for Luca. The two were great friends even if then Valerio married Barbara who had a child with Luca, Lorenzo, who will discover the truth at the beginning of the series after the disappearance of Valerio that he believed his father even if in his heart he knows that it is he his father is like this he will remain in fact this will be the actual reason that will separate Barbara from Luca after the return of Valerio who in reality had not died in the fire but had been kidnapped (he will be found by Lorenzo himself). Many intrigues and characters will intervene in their love and dark secrets will emerge but love always triumphs and even in this case it will not disappoint us not only for Barbara and Valerio but also for the little Lorenzo all this against the backdrop of a magical place like the lake. and a riding school that will make us experience loves, passions and even a pinch of police.

The series was shot in the villages of Lazio, including Ponzano Romano, Bassano Romano, Campagnano, Sacrofano, the Lake of Turano, Maltignano lake, Formello, Veio park, Rocca di Papa, Civita di Bagnoreggio and Frascati location for the station.

== Characters ==
- 'Valerio Paci' (Roberto Farnesi): Veterinarian of Poggio Sant'Angelo, in the TV film he is separated from Barbara and is the putative father of Lorenzo who loves him as if he were his son. The stables are set on fire and he is given up for dead. It is said that it was his uncle Guido and a Neapolitan man Rodolfo who set the place on fire because they want to buy the land where Valerio, for the love of his son, has built a beautiful track for horses. In the second series it turns out that he is still alive and has been held prisoner but he escapes from his kidnapper's henchmen and takes refuge in a cave not visible to the naked eye where he hid as a child with Luca, Lorenzo's father. He is found in miserable conditions by Lorenzo and Ofelia, their dog. He is taken to the hospital and given blood by Barbara and his ex-girlfriend Patrizia, Guido's daughter. He understands that he loves Barbara but he will have to deal with Luca, who in the disappearance of her wanted to prepare her territory in the life of the woman and her son. Despite everything, Barbara, with the help of Luca, chooses Valerio and the two return to live together, investigating together with the captain of the carabinieri of the valley about his kidnapping. It turns out that, during the kidnapping, he was given some drugs capable of not making him remember what happened. Even if he doesn't want to, he will come to suspect Barbara and her father who in the end together with Sergio Volturni is responsible for the kidnapping.
- 'Barbara Serramonti' (Gioia Spaziani): Determined woman and mother of Lorenzo, with whom she has a grumpy relationship in the first season due to the strong character of the child. She discovers that the child's father is Luca and not Valerio only months before the death of the latter from which she separates. Upon discovering the truth about Uncle Guido and Rodolfo, she decides not to speak to him anymore and she finds herself in love with Luca again. In the second season she is not yet ready to build a story with Luca because she thinks too much about Valerio and the finding of the latter leads to a separation of both men. Only with her patience can he ascertain that the right man is Lorenzo. In the second season we find her dealing with her past: after 20 years of her, her father returns, who had abandoned her at the age of 15. Despite everything she returns to forgive him. She cares a lot for her son Lorenzo and she will resist Sergio Voltutni's advances. Only at the end of the season she discovers the mystery that prompted her father to return to Poggio Sant'Angelo but she, still once, he will have the strength and the courage to forgive him.
- 'Luca Ferri' (Kaspar Capparoni): Luca has everything in life: a fantastic job in the States, a beautiful woman next door named Judy and a life in New York. But the death of his ex-best friend Valerio pushes him to go back to Poggio Sant'Angelo and to discover his paternity. Putting his work aside, he will investigate the death of his best friend and understand that Barbara is his ideal woman. In the second season he nurtures an affection for his son Lorenzo, which he does not reciprocate. After a quarrel he will move away from Barbara and Lorenzo when Valerio returns, to give his friend what he built in his absence.
- 'Lorenzo Ferri' (Brando Pacitto): Boy with a determined character like his mother. It will be a trauma for him to lose his father and to discover that the real father is Luca. In the second season he makes a strong friendship with Claudia, Cesare's nephew and with Caterina, daughter of the Volturni while building a grumpy relationship with Giulio, a same age as him. In the middle of the season he will get engaged to Caterina, making Claudia grow jealous but at the end of the season he will understand that he is attracted to Claudia and he will steal a long kiss from her under the eyes of her parents.
- 'Patrizia Angeloni' (Martina Colombari): Daughter of Guido and former of Valerio, she will return to Poggio Sant'Angelo after many years to donate blood to the latter. She has grumpy relationships with her father and a deep relationship will arise between her and a man of hers that she wants to hide at all costs from her friends. She buys lots of clothes and pairs of shoes
- 'Luciano Serramonte' (Fabio Testi): After 20 years he returns to Poggio Sant'Angelo with the intention of regaining his daughter and thanks to the bond with his nephew Lorenzo he will succeed. But this is not the real reason for Luciano's return but behind him hides a grumpy bond with Volturni to save the family from the latter and deliver him the jewels of the "Queen" that many years earlier he had stolen by killing thousands of people.

== Episodes ==
nº	Episode	First aired
1	The Man In the Scottish shirt	30 December 2010
2	Valerio's return	4 January 2011
3	One too many	4 January 2011
4	Fathers and sons	6 January 2011
5	Secrets	6 January 2011
6	Loves and jealousies	13 January 2011
7	Patricia	13 January 2011
8	An atrocious suspicion	20 January 2011
9	Hazardous waters	20 January 2011
10	The ghost road	27 January 2011
11	The Queen's Jewels	27 January 2011
