= Mani di fata =

- Directed by: Steno
- Cinematography: Lamberto Caimi
- Edited by: Raimondo Crociani
- Music by: Giancarlo Chiaramello
- Release date: 1983
- Running time: 89 minutes
- Country: Italy
- Language: Italian

Mani di fata (Fairy Hands) is a 1983 Italian comedy film directed by Steno.

== Plot ==
After a sudden dismissal, the engineer Andrea Ferrini, unable to find another job, begins to carry out the household chores. His wife Franca, on the contrary, is a career woman and she seems to wear the pants between the two.

== Cast ==
- Renato Pozzetto as Andrea Ferrini
- Eleonora Giorgi as Franca Ferrini
- Sylva Koscina as Countess Irene
- Maurizio Micheli as Persichetti
- Felice Andreasi as The Admiral
- Giovanni Frezza as Mariolino Ferrini
