= The Holy Family (film) =

2006 Italian television film

- Genre: Biblical drama
- Written by: Massimo De Rita; Maria Grazia Saccá; Luigi Spagnol
- Directed by: Raffaele Mertes
- Starring: Alessandro Gassmann; Ana Caterina Morariu
- Composer: Gianfranco Plenizio
- Original language: Italian

Production
- Producers: Gian Paolo Varani; Lorraine De Selle
- Cinematography: Raffaele Mertes
- Running time: 200 min.

Original release
- Network: Canale 5
- Release: 11 December 2006

The Holy Family (Italian: La sacra famiglia) is a 2006 Italian television film directed by Raffaele Mertes and starring Alessandro Gassmann and Ana Caterina Morariu.

== Cast ==
- Alessandro Gassmann as Joseph
- Ana Caterina Morariu as Mary
- Brando Pacitto as Jesus
- Franco Nero as Zachary
- Ángela Molina as Elisabeth
- Massimiliano Varrese as James
- Lorenzo De Angelis as Jude
- Dino Abbrescia as Clopas
- Jackie Sawiris as Mary of Clopas
- Gian Luca Belardi as Dimacus
- Giacomo Gonnella as Titus
