= Under the Amalfi Sun =

2022 film directed by Martina Pastori

- Italian: Sotto il sole di Amalfi
- Directed by: Martina Pastori
- Written by: Enrico Vanzina; Caterina Salvadori; Ciro Zecca
- Produced by: Mattia Guerra; Stefano Massenzi; Andrea Occhipinti
- Starring: Lorenzo Zurzolo; Ludovica Martino; Davide Calgaro; Kysan Wilson; Nicolas Maupas; Isabella Ferrari; Luca Ward
- Cinematography: Edoardo Carlo Bolli
- Edited by: Gianluca Scarpa
- Music by: Matteo Curallo
- Production company: Lucky Red
- Distributed by: Netflix
- Release date: 13 July 2022
- Running time: 95 minutes
- Country: Italy
- Language: Italian

Under the Amalfi Sun (Italian: Sotto il sole di Amalfi) is a 2022 Italian comedy-drama film directed by Martina Pastori and written by Caterina Salvadori and Enrico Vanzina. It stars Lorenzo Zurzolo, Ludovica Martino, and Isabella Ferrari.

The film is a sequel to the 2020 film Under the Riccione Sun.

== Cast ==
- Lorenzo Zurzolo as Vincenzo
- Ludovica Martino as Camilla
- Isabella Ferrari as Irene
- Luca Ward as Lucio
- Davide Calgaro as Furio
- Kyshan Wilson as Nathalie
- Nicolas Maupas as Hans
- Elena Funari as Rebecca
- Marit Nissen as Brigitte
- Raz Degan as David
- Andrea Occhipinti as Roberto
- Naomi Piscopo as Anna
- Ugo Piastrella as the electrician
- Carla Ferraro as the fortune teller

== Release ==
The film was released on Netflix on 13 July 2022.
