= Roberto Farnesi =

Italian actor

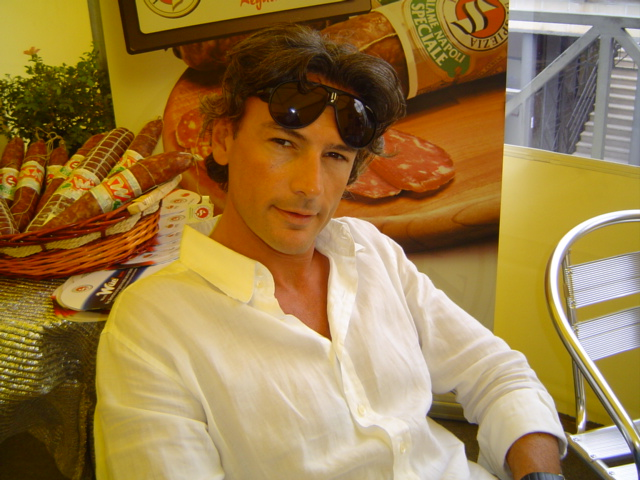
- Farnesi in 2008
- Born: 19 July 1969 (age 56); Italy
- Occupation: Actor
- Years active: 1996–present

Roberto Farnesi (born 19 July 1969) is an Italian actor.

== Filmography ==
=== Films ===
Year	Title	Role	Notes
1998	Femmina	Aloisi	
1998	Paparazzi	Anna's husband	Cameo appearance
1999	Italian gigolò	Alessio Tosato	
1999	Tea with Mussolini	Fabrizio	
2000	Le sciamane	Eugenio	
2008	Grande, grosso e... Verdone	Fabio Muso	
2009	L'ultima estate	Massimo	
2011	Oggetti smarriti	Guido	
2014	La scuola più bella del mondo	Virgilio Neri	
2016	Infernet	Claudio	

=== Television ===
Year	Title	Role	Notes
1999–2001	Turbo	Luca Sepe	8 episodes
2000	La stanza della fotografa	Marco	Television film
2001–2003	CentoVetrine	Giuliano Corsini	460 episodes
2003–2005	Carabinieri	Luigi Testa	62 episodes
2006–2008	Questa è la mia terra	Andrea Acciari	14 episodes
2007	Donne sbagliate	Inspector Puglisi	2 episodes
2007	Caterina e le sue figlie	Romano Cioni	6 episodes
2008	Per una notte d'amore	Alessio Natali	Television film
2009	Butta la luna	Luca Ferrari	13 episodes
2009	Al di là del lago	Valerio Paci	Television film
2009	Non smettere di sognare	Lorenzo Molinari	Television film
2010	Colpo di fulmine	Leonardo	Television film
2010–2011	Al di là del lago	Valerio Paci	11 episodes
2011	Non smettere di sognare	Lorenzo Molinari	6 episodes
2012–2018	Le tre rose di Eva	Alessandro Monforte	50 episodes
2013	Ballando con le Stelle	Contestant	Talent show (season 9)
2017	Solo per amore	Andrea Fiore	3 episodes
2018–present	Il paradiso delle signore	Umberto Guarnieri	239 episodes
