= Davide Calgaro =

Italian actor and comedian (born 2000)

- Born: 18 August 2000 (age 26); Milan, Italy
- Occupations: Actor; comedian

Davide Calgaro (born 18 August 2000) is an Italian actor and comedian. He is best known for his roles in the Netflix comedy-drama films Under the Riccione Sun (2020) and Under the Amalfi Sun (2022).

== Biography ==
Calgaro was born and raised in the Baggio district of Milan, the third of six siblings. His parents are both doctors. As a teenager, he began taking acting classes at the Grock theater school and performing at open mics. In 2021, he toured Italy with a comedy show titled Venti Freschi. In 2024, he toured a show titled Millennium Bug.

== Filmography ==
=== Film ===
Year	Title	Role	Ref.
2020	I Hate Summer	Salvo	
2020	Under the Riccione Sun	Furio	
2022	Le voci sole	Pietro	
2022	A Breath of Fresh Air	Enzo	
2022	Under the Amalfi Sun	Furio	
2022	The Wedding Days	Gabbo	

=== Television ===
Year	Title	Role	Notes	Ref.
2020	Doc – Nelle tue mani	Jacopo	1 episode	
2021	Blanca	Bartolomeo Valli	1 episode	
2024	No Activity: Italy	Nicola	Main role; 6 episodes	
2024–2026	Accidentally Famous	Cisco	Main role; 12 episodes	
