= Maria Luisa De Crescenzo =

Italian actress (born 1992)

- Born: 12 January 1992 (age 33); Rome, Italy
- Occupation: Actress

Maria Luisa De Crescenzo (born 12 January 1992) is an Italian actress. Her credits include the television series Maggie & Bianca: Fashion Friends and the films The Best Day of My Life, A Flat for Three, and Under the Riccione Sun.

== Career ==
Her first acting appearance was the starring role of Chiara in the award-winning film The Best Day of My Life in 2002.

== Filmography ==
=== Film ===
| Year | Title | Role | Notes |
|---|---|---|---|
| 2002 | The Best Day of My Life | Chiara | |
| 2009 | David's Birthday | Aurora | |
| 2011 | Corpo Celeste | Rosa | |
| 2012 | A Flat for Three | Agnese | |
| 2012 | Young Europe | Annalisa | |
| 2014 | Vittima degli eventi | Ilaria | |
| 2015 | Vacanze ai Caraibi | Anna Pia | |
| 2016 | Piccoli segreti, grandi bugie | Camilla Del Monaco | TV movie |
| 2017 | UPP | Anna | Short |
| 2020 | Under the Riccione Sun | Bea | |
| 2021 | Olivia | Olivia | |

=== Television ===
| Year | Title | Role | Notes |
|---|---|---|---|
| 2013 | Rosso San Valentino | Flavia Danieli | 6 episodes |
| 2017 | Maggie & Bianca: Fashion Friends | Eloise Gale | 26 episodes |
| 2024 | Those About to Die | Linza | |
