= Squali =

2025 film by Daniele Barbiero

- Italian theatrical release poster
- Directed by: Daniele Barbiero
- Screenplay by: Mauro Graiani
- Based on: Gli squali by Giacomo Mazzariol
- Starring: Lorenzo Zurzolo; James Franco
- Cinematography: Andrea Reitano
- Edited by: Gianluca Conca
- Music by: Diana Tejera
- Production companies: Camaleo Film; Rhino; Eagle Pictures; Neo Art Producciones; Agresywna Banda
- Distributed by: Eagle Pictures
- Release date: 16 October 2025 (Italy)
- Countries: Italy; Spain; Poland
- Languages: Italian; English

Squali (transl. Sharks) is a 2025 Italian film directed by Daniele Barbiero in his feature directorial debut, loosely based on the novel Gli squali by Giacomo Mazzariol. It stars Lorenzo Zurzolo and James Franco. It received a theatrical release in Italy on 16 October 2025.

== Cast ==
- Lorenzo Zurzolo as Max
- James Franco as Robert Price
- Francesco Centorame as Filippo
- Ginevra Francesconi as Anna
- Francesco Gheghi as Jonah
- Greta Fernández as Miriam
- Federica Baù
- Gabriele Rollo
- Melania Dalla Costa as Valeria

== Production ==
Principal photography began in July 2024. Filming took place over six weeks in Veneto and Lazio.

== Release ==
A trailer was released on 25 August 2025. The film received a theatrical release in Italy on 16 October 2025.
