= A Breath of Fresh Air (film) =

2022 Italian film by Alessio Lauria

- Italian: Una boccata d'aria
- Directed by: Alessio Lauria
- Written by: Aldo Baglio; Alessio Lauria; Valerio Bariletti; Morgan Bertacca
- Produced by: Maurizio Milo; Matteo Rovere
- Starring: Aldo Baglio; Lucia Ocone; Giovanni Calcagno; Ludovica Martino; Davide Calgaro
- Cinematography: Luca Nervegna
- Edited by: Francesco Loffredo
- Music by: Federico Bisozzi
- Production companies: Groenlandia; Rai Cinema
- Distributed by: 01 Distribution; Netflix
- Release dates: 7 July 2022 (Italy); 17 October 2022 (Worldwide)
- Running time: 90 minutes
- Country: Italy
- Language: Italian

A Breath of Fresh Air (Italian: Una boccata d'aria) is a 2022 Italian comedy drama film directed by Alessio Lauria. It was released in Italy on 7 July 2022. It was later released worldwide on Netflix on 17 October 2022.

== Premise ==
Two estranged brothers, Salvo and Lillo, are united by the death of their father. When Salvo returns to Sicily, he intends to sell the family farm and save his pizzeria, which is on the verge of bankruptcy. This, however, proves to be more difficult than he had originally planned.

== Cast ==
- Aldo Baglio as Salvo
- Giovanni Calcagno as Lillo
- Lucia Ocone as Teresa
- Ludovica Martino as Emma
- Davide Calgaro as Enzo
- Manuela Ventura as Carmela
- Tony Sperandeo as Nunzio
- Marcello Mazzarella as Notaio Rosario
