= Cristina Comencini =

Italian film director, and novelist

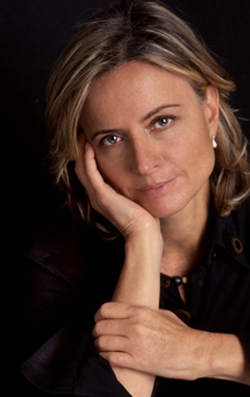
- Cristina Comencini pictured in 2008
- Born: 8 May 1956 (age 69); Rome, Italy
- Occupations: Film director; screenwriter; novelist
- Years active: 1982–present
- Children: 3, including Carlo Calenda
- Father: Luigi Comencini
- Relatives: Francesca Comencini (sister)

Cristina Comencini (Italian: [kriˈstiːna komenˈtʃiːni]; born 8 May 1956) is an Italian film director, screenwriter and novelist.

== Biography ==
She is one of four daughters of Italian film director Luigi Comencini. She attended with her sisters the Lycée français Chateaubriand in her native city of Rome.

Cristina Comencini's 2005 film The Beast in the Heart, based on her own novel La bestia nel cuore, was nominated for an Academy Award for Best Foreign Language Film. Her 2011 film When the Night, based on her own novel and published in the United States by Other Press, competed in competition at the 68th Venice International Film Festival.

She is the mother of former Minister of Economic Development, Carlo Calenda.

== Filmography ==
- 1989: Zoo
- 1993: La fine è nota
- 1996: Va' dove ti porta il cuore
- 1998: Matrimoni
- 2000: Liberate i pesci!
- 2002: The Best Day of My Life (Il più bel giorno della mia vita)
- 2005: La mia mano destra
- 2005: The Beast in the Heart (La bestia nel cuore)
- 2008: Black and White
- 2009: Due partite
- 2011: When the Night (Quando la notte)
- 2015: Latin Lover
- 2016: Something new
- 2018: Sex Story
- 2019: To Return
- 2024: The Children's Train

== Books in translation ==
- 1994: The Missing Pages
- 2012: When the Night, published by Other Press
