= A Blade in the Dark =

1983 Italian giallo film directed by Lamberto Bava

- Italian theatrical release poster
- Italian: La casa con la scala nel buio
- Literally: The House with the Dark Staircase
- Directed by: Lamberto Bava
- Screenplay by: Elisa Briganti; Dardano Sacchetti
- Produced by: Lamberto Bava; Mino Loy; Luciano Martino
- Starring: Andrea Occhipinti; Anny Papa; Fabiola Toledo; Michele Soavi; Valeria Cavalli
- Cinematography: Gianlorenzo Battaglia
- Edited by: Lamberto Bava
- Music by: Guido & Maurizio De Angelis
- Release date: 6 August 1983
- Running time: 108 minutes
- Country: Italy

A Blade in the Dark (Italian: La casa con la scala nel buio, lit. 'The House with the Staircase in the Dark') is a 1983 Italian giallo film directed by Lamberto Bava and starring Andrea Occhipinti, Michele Soavi, and Valeria Cavalli. Originally planned for television, the film was made as a nearly two hour piece split into four parts each of which would end with a murder scene. After the film was found to be too gruesome for Italian television censors, it was re-edited into a feature film.

== Plot ==
Musician Bruno is hired to compose soundtrack for an upcoming horror film, and rents the villa where the film is set for inspiration. Director Sandra is trying to capture the fear of the dark in the film, and is keeping the film's ending concealed. Property owner Tony Rendina, who is leaving to his father's rig in Kuwait, is delighted that Bruno accepts his request for some of his music, which Bruno promises to arrange for recording on a cassette. Giovanni lives in the basement as the groundskeeper, and Bruno's girlfriend Giulia is an actress off to another city for a stage play. Bruno is told before Tony owned the property, a woman named Linda leased out the villa, but she went missing after moving out.

An unseen figure steals an extendable box cutter from Bruno's studio. Bruno meets Katia, one of the neighbors, who comes in unannounced. Katia flirts with him before leaving. Bruno finds Katia left her diary behind, which says she found out Linda's "secret". Outside, Katia is attacked by the figure, who chases her into the basement before slashing her to death. When Bruno goes outside to smoke a cigarette, he is oblivious to the killer dragging Katia's body through the yard. In the house, he finds blood on his pants and receives a silent phone call.

Bruno eventually goes over his music tapes, where he hears a woman's voice whispering "no one must know" about Linda's secret. The tapes are later destroyed, and Katia's diary pages thrown into the fireplace. Giulia makes a surprise visit to Bruno, supposedly in between rehearsals. When Bruno vocalizes his suspicions of Katia's murder, Giulia disbelieves him and worries Bruno is cheating on her. When Bruno later calls the theater company, the director reveals Giulia was fired from the play.

Katia's roommate Angela arrives, saying that Linda sometimes let them use her swimming in her pool. Bruno obliges, but Angela is hesitant to answer his questions about Linda. In the pool, Angela finds the box cutter sunk to the floor. When Angela goes back inside to wash her hair, Linda-donning a skirt, red nail polish, and armed with a knife—stabs her hand into the bathroom vanity counter, covers her head in plastic and beats her head on the counter edge. She then rips Angela's hand away and slashes her throat over the bathtub before cleaning the scene.

When Bruno sees the kitchen knife out of place and a hole in the vanity, he suspects Giulia has been murdered. He searches Linda's stored belongings in the basement with Sandra, which include a suitcase full of tennis balls. Sandra reveals Linda is the film's primary inspiration. Sandra places a call to Linda, saying how sorry she is and that she embellished the ending specifically, but Linda quietly cries and hangs up. Linda is shown back at the villa. She retaliates by finding the final scene at the studio and shredding it with scissors. When Giovanni discovers Katia and Angela dead inside a tank, Linda bludgeons him to death with his own wrench. When Sandra arrives to reconcile with Linda, carrying a knife for self-defense, Giovanni jumps out to grab her before he dies. Linda surprises Sandra by garroting her with the film reel, laughing maniacally while dragging her corpse around.

Giulia arrives to find Sandra's body buried under film. Linda traps Giulia in the house by closing the garage door, taunting her with threats, messing with the lights, and dropping a ton of tennis balls from the ceiling. Giulia hides in a cabinet when she sees Linda, who finds her and wedges the knife in the closed door. When Bruno arrives, Giulia takes her chance to run, but Linda pierces her through her heart with the kitchen knife.

With Bruno happening upon the scene, Linda charges him, only for Bruno to knock her out with a brick. Bruno is then surprised when only a wig is where Linda was left. The killer jumps out, revealing himself as Tony all along. When Tony tries to stab him, Bruno rams the knife in Tony, who slowly dies while muttering "I'm not a female child". Bruno talks with a crew member, revealing Tony was too insecure and childlike inside to stave off Linda, his alter-ego, so he murdered other women out of rage and to prove he was a man.

== Cast ==
- Andrea Occhipinti as Bruno
- Michele Soavi as Tony Rendina / Linda
- Lara Lamberti as Giulia Rubini (credited as Lara Naszinski)
- Fabiola Toledo as Angela
- Anny Papa as Sandra
- Stanko Molnar as Giovanni
- Valeria Cavalli as Katia
- Giovanni Frezza as Young Boy In Film Clip
- Lamberto Bava as Cameo In Editing Room

== Production ==
Lamberto Bava was offered to direct A Blade in the Dark while he was assisting Dario Argento on Tenebrae (1982). The film was written by the husband and wife writing team of Dardano Sacchetti and Elisa Briganti. Bava and Sacchetti recalled that their collaboration was difficult, with the two being more friendly during the production of A Bay of Blood (1971), but their approach to this film was at odds with each other.

The film was initially commissioned to be made for Italian television by producer Mino Loy and have been aired in four 30 minute segments. Bava explained that his initial goal was to have a shocking murder at the end of each segment. Producer Luciano Martino offered Bava his villa as a location for filming.

== Release ==
When the film was presented to the television censors, it was found to be too gory to be aired. Rather than edit the film, the producers instructed Bava to cut the film into a theatrical feature. This led to the 16mm print being blown up to 35mm for theatrical distribution. The film was released in Italy on 6 August 1983.

Troy Howarth in his book on giallo films described the English dubbing of the film as "some of the worst to be inflicted upon any giallo".

=== Home media ===
The film was released three times on DVD in the United States. It was first released by Anchor Bay Entertainment in 2001. The company subsequently re-released it in 2003 on a double feature DVD with Lamberto Bava's Macabre. Both these versions are out of print. The third DVD release came from Blue Underground in 2007.

On Blu-ray, the film was released for the first time by 88 Films on August 23, 2015.

Vinegar Syndrome released the film in a special edition 4K UHD and Blu-ray set in 2023 in an extended cut of the film, running approximately 110 minutes.

== Critical reception ==
Robert Firsching of AllMovie gave the film a mixed review, writing, "Lamberto Bava eschews complex mystery in favor of elaborate stalk-and-slash sequences, with only partial success".

== Sources ==
- Howarth, Troy (2015). So Deadly, So Perverse. Vol. 2. Midnight Marquee Press. ISBN 978-1936168583.
- Luther-Smith, Adrian (1999). Blood and Black Lace: The Definitive Guide to Italian Sex and Horror Movies. Stray Cat Publishing.
- Paul, Louis (2005). Italian Horror Film Directors. Jefferson, North Carolina: McFarland. ISBN 978-0-7864-8749-3.
