= Isabella Ferrari =

Italian actress of television, theatre and the cinema

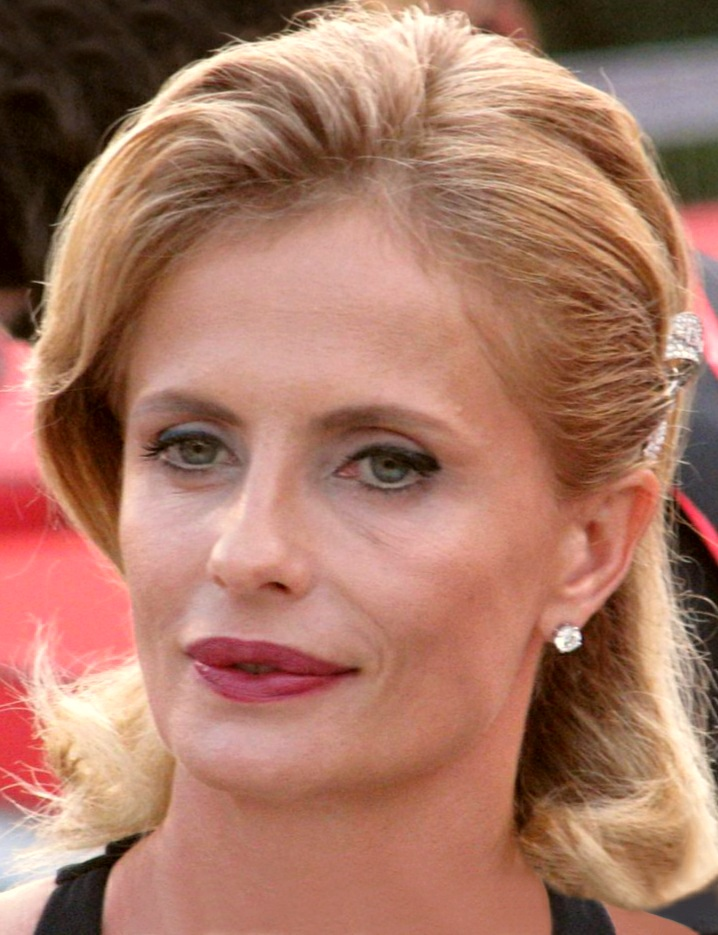
- Ferrari in 2008
- Born: Isabella Fogliazza; 31 March 1964 (age 62); Ponte dell'Olio, Piacenza, Italy
- Occupation: Actress
- Known for: Distretto di Polizia
- Spouse: Renato De Maria (m. 2002)
- Children: 3

Isabella Fogliazza (born 31 March 1964), better known by her stage name of Isabella Ferrari, is an Italian actress. She's best known for her role as Chief Giovanna Scalise in the first two seasons of Italian police procedural series Distretto di Polizia (2000–2002). At the 1995 Venice Film Festival she won a Volpi Cup award for Best Supporting Actress in the film The Story of a Poor Young Man (1995).

== Career ==
Ferrari was born Isabella Fogliazza in Ponte dell'Olio, Province of Piacenza, Emilia-Romagna. At the age of 15, she was elected Miss Teenager in a contest held in a discoteque. She made her acting debut at the age of 17 as Selvaggia in the Carlo Vanzini comedy Sapore di mare in 1982; she also performed in the film's sequel Sapore di mare 2- un anno dopo. Since then, she has regularly performed in films, television and the theatre. She is best known to the Italian audience as Police Commissioner Giovanna Scalise, the protagonist in the first two seasons of the police drama series Distretto di Polizia.

At the 1995 Venice Film Festival, Ferrari won a Volpi Cup for Best Supporting Actress in the Ettore Scola film Romanzo di un giovane povero in which she played the part of Andreina.

She was nominated to the David di Donatello for Best Supporting Actress in 2006 thanks to her performance in The Goodbye Kiss and in 2008 for her performance in Quiet Chaos.

In 2021, she was selected as a jury member for the International competition section of the 74th Locarno Film Festival held from 4 to 14 August.

In May 2025, she joined the cast of Bertrand Mandico's upcoming film Roma Elastica.

== Personal life ==
Ferrari lives in Rome, Italy, and is the mother of three children. Her eldest daughter, Teresa, who was born in 1995, is by her first husband, Massimo Osti; and her younger daughter, Nina (born 1998), and son, Giovanni (born 2001) are by her second husband, director Renato De Maria.

== Filmography ==
=== Film ===
Year	Title	Role	Notes
1983	Il ras del quartiere	Veronica Gatti	
1983	Time for Loving	Selvaggia Binetti	
1983	Time for Loving 2: One Year After	Selvaggia Binetti	
1984	Domani mi sposo	Susy	
1984	Chewingum	Isabella De Santi	
1984	Good King Dagobert	Chrodilde	
1985	Fracchia contro Dracula	Luna Jabonsk	
1986	Il ragazzo del Pony Express	Claudia	
1988	Appointment in Liverpool	Caterina Dossena	
1989	Willy Signori e vengo da lontano	Lucia Ventura	
1991	Oostende	Lyota	
1992	Gangsters	Evelina	
1992	Allullo Drom	Lorenza	
1992	Nessuno mi crede	Susi	
1993	80 mq	Her	Segment: "Bisbigli"
1995	The Story of a Poor Young Man	Andreina	
1996	Escoriandoli	Tarcisia	
1996	Cronaca di un amore violato	Lorena	
1996	Hotel Paura	Lucia	
1997	K	Emma Güter	
1998	Mare largo	Clara	
1998	Vite in sospeso	Eugenia	
1998	Dolce far niente	Josephine	
2000	Holy Tongue	Patrizia	
2005	Amatemi	Nina	
2005	L'Anniversaire	Gabriella	
2006	The Goodbye Kiss	Flora	
2007	Saturn in Opposition	Laura	
2008	Quiet Chaos	Eleonora Simoncini	
2008	A Perfect Day	Emma Tempesta	
2008	The Seed of Discord	Monica	
2009	The Ladies Get Their Say	Beatrice	
2012	They Call It Summer	Anna	
2013	The Great Beauty	Orietta	
2014	The Medicine Seller	Giovanna	
2014	La vita oscena	Andrea's Mother	
2015	Uno per tutti	Eloisa	
2017	Diva!	Valentina Cortese	
2017	Naples in Veils	Valeria	
2018	Euphoria	Michela	
2018	In viaggio con Adele	Carla Mariani	
2018	Cosa fai a Capodanno?	Domitilla	
2020	Under the Riccione Sun	Irene	
2020	È per il tuo bene	Isabella	
2022	La mia ombra è tua	Milena	
2022	Under the Amalfi Sun	Irene	
2022	Robbing Mussolini	Nora Cavalieri	
2024	Confidenza	Tilde	
2024	Parthenope	Flora Malva	
2024	Cortina Express	Patrizia Giordano	
2026	You, Me & Tuscany	Gabriella Costa	
2026	Nel tepore del ballo	Clara Bruson	
2026	Roma Elastica	Claudia	
2026	Hexed	Queen Celeste (voice)	Italian dub
TBA	To Fall †		Filming

=== Television ===
Year	Title	Role	Notes
1987	Professione vacanze	Alice	Episode: "A qualcuno piace il calcio"
1993	Les Mercredis de la vie	Maria	Episode: "Un homme à la mer"
1994	Haute tension	Anna Caron	Episode: "Impasse meurtrière"
1998	Provincia segreta	Raffaella Granelli	Main role (season 1); 3 episodes
1998	Nicholas' Gift	Alessandra	Television movie
2000	Sospetti	Serena Arcalli	Main role (season 1); 6 episodes
2000–2002	Distretto di Polizia	Chief Giovanna Scalise	Lead role (season 1-2), guest (season 3); 47 episodes
2003	Doppio agguato	Anna Millesi	Television movie
2004–2005	Cuore contro cuore	Francesca De Luca	Lead role; 22 episodes
2007	Liberi di giocare	Silvia Mauri	Television movie
2009	Eisfieber	Antonia Gallo	Television movie
2011	Storia di Laura	Laura	Television movie
2015	Una grande famiglia	Claudia Manetti	Main role (season 3); 8 episodes
2018–2020	Baby	Simonetta Loreti	Main role; 18 episodes
2023	Sei donne – Il mistero di Leila	Viola Razzieri	Main role; 4 episodes
2023	Gigolò per caso	Francesca	Episode: "Chapter 2: Francesca"
2026	Estranei	Loredana	Main role; 8 episodes

== Theatre ==
- Anestesia totale (2011)
- Il catalogo (2010)
- Due partite (2006)
- I tre alberghi (1999)
- Ondine (1994))
