= Lorenzo Zurzolo =

Italian actor (born 2000)

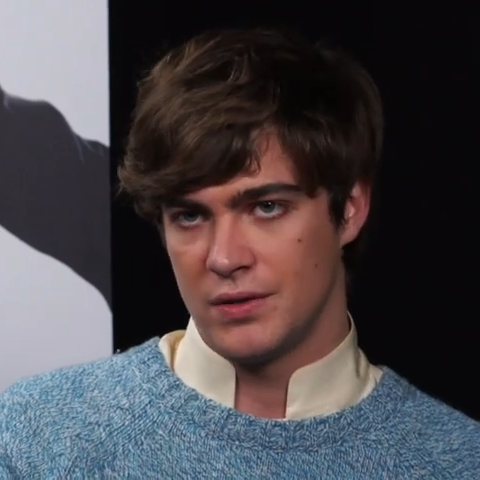
- Zurzolo in 2025
- Born: 21 March 2000 (age 26); Rome, Italy
- Occupation: Actor
- Years active: 2008–present

Lorenzo Zurzolo (born 21 March 2000) is an Italian actor. He is best known for his role in the Netflix television series Baby (2018–2020), as well as the films EO (2022), and La bola negra (2026).

== Early life ==
Zurzolo was born in Rome to Federico Zurzolo, a RAI journalist, and Gabria Cipullo, a film producer. He has an older sister. He attended a liceo linguistico and spent six months in England during his high school years. He studied acting at the Scuola di Recitazione Omnes Artes in Rome.

== Career ==
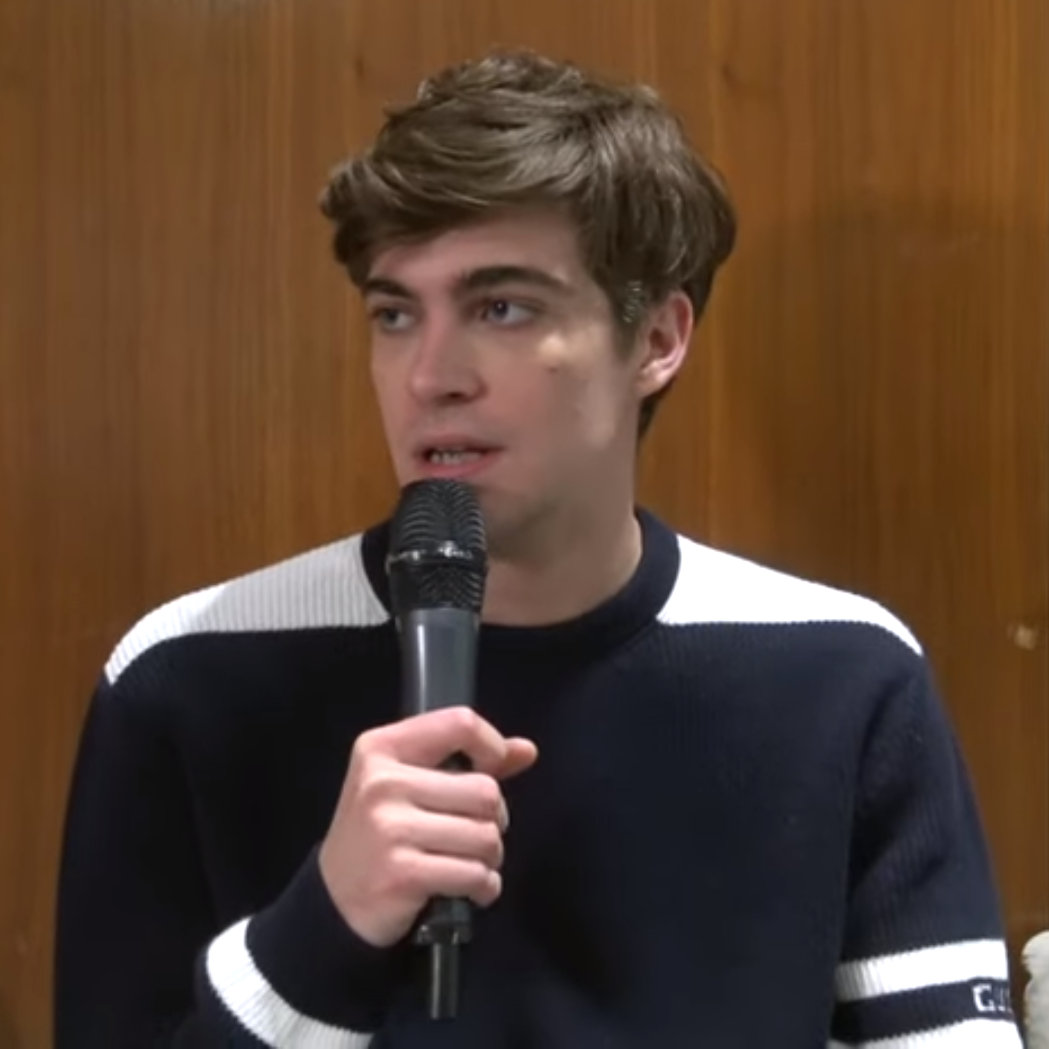
Zurzolo in 2024

At the age of seven, Zurzolo appeared in a Vodafone commercial with footballer Francesco Totti, marking his entry into the acting world. At the age of nine, he made his television debut on the television series Amiche mie. In 2012, he made his film debut in Paolo Genovese's comedy film A Perfect Family. The following year, he had a role in the film Outing - Fidanzati per sbaglio.

From 2022 to 2024, he starred in the Amazon Prime Video television series Prisma, which ran for two seasons. In 2025, he starred in the film Squali alongside James Franco.

== Personal life ==
Zurzulo is fan of AS Roma.

== Filmography ==
=== Film ===
Year	Title	Role	Ref.
2012	A Perfect Family	Angelo	
2013	Outing - Fidanzati per sbaglio	Lorenzo	
2018	Sconnessi	Giulio Ranieri	
2019	Compromessi sposi	Riccardo	
2020	Under the Riccione Sun	Vincenzo	
2020	Weekend	Alessandro	
2021	Morrison	Lodovico	
2022	EO	Vito	
2022	Under the Amalfi Sun	Vincenzo	
2023	Diabolik: Who Are You?	Young Diabolik	
2024	Arenas	Carmine	
2025	In the Hand of Dante	Young Don Lecco	
2025	Squali	Max	
2025	Strike - Figli di un'era sbagliata	Forrest; Vittorio	
2026	La bola negra	Riccardo	
TBA	7 anniversari	TBA	

=== Television ===
Year	Title	Role	Notes	Ref.
2008	Amiche mie	Mattia	Supporting role	
2008	Don Matteo	Simone	1 episode	
2012	Un passo dal cielo	Andrea	1 episode	
2015	Questo è il mio paese	Nino Ferrari	6 episodes	
2018	Una pallottola nel cuore	Michele Frugoni	6 episodes	
2018–2020	Baby	Niccolò Rossi Govender	18 episodes	
2022–2024	Prisma	Daniele	Main role; 16 episodes	
2024	La Storia	Carlo Vivaldi/Davide Segre	8 episodes	
2025	Mussolini: Son of the Century	Italo Balbo	7 episodes	

== Awards and nominations ==
Award	Year	Category	Nominated work	Result	Ref.
Giffoni Film Festival	2020	Explosive Talent Award		Won	
Monte-Carlo Film Festival de la Comédie	2022	Next Generation Award: Best Under-30 Performer		Won	
Nastro d'Argento	2021	Persol Prize for Character of the Year	Morrison	Won	
Venice International Film Festival	2021	Premio Kinéo	Morrison	Won	
