= Manhattan Baby =

1982 film directed by Lucio Fulci

- Film poster
- Directed by: Lucio Fulci
- Screenplay by: Elisa Livia Briganti; Dardano Sacchetti
- Story by: Elisa Livia Briganti; Dardano Sacchetti
- Produced by: Fabrizio De Angelis
- Starring: Christopher Connelly; Martha Taylor; Brigitta Boccoli; Giovanni Frezza
- Cinematography: Guglielmo Mancori
- Edited by: Vincenzo Tomassi
- Music by: Fabio Frizzi
- Production company: Fulvia Film
- Distributed by: Fulvia Films
- Release date: 12 August 1982 (Italy)
- Running time: 89 minutes
- Country: Italy

Manhattan Baby is a 1982 Italian horror film directed by Lucio Fulci, and starring Christopher Connelly and Carlo De Mejo.

Manhattan Baby was shot in New York, Egypt, and Rome in March and April 1982. It was originally planned to be one of Fulci's more expensive films, but its budget was cut in half during production. After the film's release, both Fulci and screenwriter Dardano Sacchetti dismissed it. Fulci would not work with producer Fabrizio De Angelis again. The film received negative reviews from Corriere della Sera and La Stampa.

== Plot ==
On holiday in Egypt with her archaeologist father George and journalist mother Emily, nine-year-old Susie Hacker is approached by a mysterious blind woman who gives her an amulet. Soon after, George becomes blind when he enters a previously unexplored tomb. His vision returns, however, upon returning to New York City. Susie, her younger brother Tommy, and their au pair, Jamie Lee, are affected by the amulet, gaining supernatural access to dimensional doorways. When George's eyesight returns, he describes the design on the wall of the tomb he'd entered to a colleague named Wiler.

At her office, Emily and a colleague, Luke, are working on an article about the events in Egypt when a panicked Jamie Lee phones to say the children are locked in their bedroom. Emily and Luke arrive at the house, but when Luke tries to unlock the door, he is sucked into a dimensional portal, appearing amidst the vast, arid Egyptian desert, where he later dies of dehydration. The Hackers treat Luke's disappearance as a practical joke.

Jamie Lee takes the children to Central Park, where she takes photos of them. A woman picks up a discarded Polaroid of Susie that shows nothing but the amulet against the grassy background. The woman contacts a man called Adrian Marcato, and the next day she drops the Polaroid, now containing Marcato's contact details, down to Mrs. Hacker from a window.

The children appear and disappear from their bedrooms on what Tommy calls "voyages." When Jamie Lee disappears after entering Tommy's room, he tells his mother that she has not come back from her voyage. That evening, as Wiler studies a photograph of the amulet, he is fatally bitten by a cobra that appears in his office. The photo reappears in Susie's hand as she recovers from a mysterious fit.

The Hackers track down Marcato to his antique shop. He tells them about the evil symbolism of the amulet and suggests that Susie has absorbed its energy. When George and Emily find it in Susie's bedroom drawer, she appears to them glowing with an unearthly blue light and then faints. Marcato is called to their apartment to examine Susie, but her inner voice possesses him crying for help and falls to the ground, bleeding and foaming at the mouth. He regains consciousness and successfully links minds briefly with George, showing him a glimpse into the eldritch Egypt his children have been visiting.

George and Emily take Susie to a nearby hospital where the physician, Dr. Forrester, examines her. An X-ray shows the dark shape of a hooded cobra mark inside her chest. While Emily maintains a bedside vigil for the near-comatose Susie, Tommy is alone in the apartment. Suddenly, Jamie Lee turns up, bursting through a wall as a reanimated rotting cadaver before she drops dead. A strange blue light of negative energy flows from Tommy, the bedridden Susie, and the dimensional doorways and channels into Marcato's home, where he is reciting an ancient Egyptian spell.

George goes to see Marcato, who tells him that he can stop worrying about his children. Marcato has channeled the evil energy away from the children with the spell, and the curse is now on him. He gives George the amulet and tells him to discard it so the curse will not affect anyone else. That night, Marcato is killed at his shop by the reanimated carcasses of his stuffed birds. A healed Susie wakes up with her mother by her bedside at the hospital. The following morning, George, following Marcato's last suggestion, flings the amulet into the East River, ending their ordeal.

In the final scene back in Egypt, the mystical blind woman again appears and gives the same amulet to another young girl, intending to continue the curse for the forces of darkness, bringing it full circle.

== Cast ==
- Christopher Connelly as Professor George Hacker
- Laura Lenzi as Emily Hacker (credited as Martha Taylor)
- Giovanni Frezza as Tommy Hacker
- Brigitta Boccoli as Susie Hacker
- Cinzia De Ponti as Jamie Lee
- Cosimo Cinieri as Adrian Mercato (credited as Laurence Welles)
- Andrea Bosic as Optician
- Carlo De Mejo as Luke

== Production ==
Manhattan Baby was originally planned to have a larger budget than any of the films that Lucio Fulci had previously directed for producer Fabrizio De Angelis. Fulci wanted to experiment and create a film more ethereal and immersive than his previous entries in the horror genre, by using special effects that were optical rather than practical, in contrast to the many gory puppetry and make-up effects of Zombi 2 and The Beyond. Screenwriter Dardano Sacchetti stated that the film's budget was drastically cut from 800 million to 400 million lire. Sacchetti collaborated with his wife Elisa Briganti on a script originally titled Il malocchio (lit. 'The Evil Eye'), which he described as "an attempt to do a technological piece. I was attempting to approach themes that were no longer classic or traditionally Gothic. I was trying to bring horror in a different direction."

The film was shot in 1982, from 8 March to the end of April, around Cairo, in New York, and at De Paolis Studios in Rome. A second unit team was shooting Enzo G. Castellari's 1990: The Bronx Warriors around the same time. Sacchetti says the extended opening scene in Egypt was added as an afterthought, to "give the film an international feel."

== Release ==
Manhattan Baby was released in Italy on 12 August 1982, distributed by Fulvia Films. The film grossed a total of L.409,424,657 domestically. It was picked up for distribution in the United States in 1984, but released only theatrically, as Eye of the Evil Dead. It was released in the United Kingdom in 1983, directly to video, under the title The Possessed. The film was released on DVD on 29 May 2001 by Anchor Bay Entertainment.

Manhattan Baby would end the partnership between Fulci and De Angelis. Fulci disliked the film, but stated that he had no choice but to make it, as De Angelis was obsessed with it. Fulci would say that it was "a terrible movie; I'd venture to describe it as one of those setbacks that occur as you go along". Sacchetti and Briganti were also not pleased with the film's finished product, with the former stating that "when the producers decided to cut three-quarters of the budget, some of the special effects could not be realised, and the film was ultimately very poor."

== Reception ==
From contemporary reviews, Kim Newman (Monthly Film Bulletin) described Manhattan Baby as Fulci's "smallest, most personal genre film." Newman commented on the film's focus on eyes, stating that "some of the effect is lost on video, this wide-screen dwelling on a single infinitely variable image turns the film into an almost hypnotic screen experience. It is also woodenly scripted, stiffly acted, funereally paced and impossible to follow on any narrative level." Newman concluded that the film "absolves itself from having to make sense: the rough circularity of the story, the insistence on mosaic images rather than smooth plotting, and the impossibility of attributing noble or heroic motives to the character of Marcato, finally serve to remind us that the supernatural is also the irrational." Aldo Vigano of La Stampa found the film "unconvincing and rather predictable." Leonardo Autera of Corriere della Sera commented, "They say that Lucio Fulci, the director, is the most gifted heir in the 'Italian horror' genre, of the late Mario Bava. But there is a substantial difference: Bava knew how to follow Poe's lesson that even the absurd must have an inner logic, Fulci, instead, navigates in the most absolute arbitrariness, the kind not even the old-time Grand Guignol would have dared."

From retrospective reviews, AllMovie panned the movie, finding it to be one of Fulci's worst. Critiquing the continuous presence of eyes, the review declared that it was "a pointless and stupid film of no possible interest to anyone except demented opticians." Louis Paul, author of the book Italian Horror Film Directors, opined that "although it contains some graphic murders, ultimately [Manhattan Baby] is a decidedly lifeless affair."

Review by Budd Wilkins "“You can take my life with stuffed birds, but you shall not have my soul!” an ill-fated antiques dealer vows while being pecked to death at the climax of Lucio Fulci’s demented Manhattan Baby. The biggest surprise here—as if the sight of a man being set upon by sawdust-crammed fowl weren’t enough—is that this is practically the only gory set piece in an early-1980s Fulci film, at a time when the Italian filmmaker’s name was practically synonymous with squishy prosthetic pandemonium." explains "In many ways, Manhattan Baby is a transitional film for Fulci, as he moved away from the practical effects that dominated his gore films toward a more extensive use of optical effects, owing perhaps to the popularity of films like Poltergeist. Not coincidentally, Fulci’s next two projects would be effects-laden sci-fi/fantasy films."

Review By Gabe Powers "while I would not count Manhattan Baby as classic, must-see Fulci, it is on the short list of movies that I’d recommend to Italian horror neophytes and detractors strictly for its visual and tonal qualities. It’s more or less a companion piece to Black Cat.'"
