= Giovanni Frezza =

Italian actor

- Born: 8 September 1972 (age 53); Potenza, Italy
- Occupations: Actor (former), Dive Master, Martial Arts trainer & Product Development Director
- Years active: 1980–1985

Giovanni Frezza (born 8 September 1972) is an Italian former child actor, diver, martial artist and product developer who appeared in a number of films throughout the 1980s. Frezza is possibly best recalled for his roles in several horror films.

== Early life ==
Giovanni Frezza was born in Potenza, Basilicata, Italy.

== Career ==
He made his film debut with a minor role the 1980 Marco Bellocchio-directed comedy-drama Salto nel vuoto (English title: A Leap in the Dark). Frezza then went on to play a variety of juvenile roles, most often in horror films. In 1981 he had a starring role in the gory, supernatural-themed Lucio Fulci-directed The House by the Cemetery as Bob Boyle, an imperiled child living in a sinister New England house. He worked with Fulci a second time in 1982's Manhattan Baby as the brother of a little girl possessed by a supernatural amulet. In 1982 he appeared in Enzo G. Castellari-directed post-apocalyptic Italian action film I Nuovi barbari (English: The New Barbarians).

Frezza would continue appearing in films until 1985. His last role was as Kirk in the 1985 Dario Argento-penned and Lamberto Bava-directed thriller Dèmoni (English: Demons). After retiring from films at age thirteen, Frezza concentrated on his studies.

Giovanni is currently working as a Director-Product Development at Molex LLC.

== Personal life ==
According to his official MySpace page, he currently resides in Chicago and is a married father of three children who works as a Director for a multinational technology company.

== Filmography ==
- A Leap in the Dark (1980) (Italian title: Salto nel vuoto, also known as Leap into the Void)
- The House by the Cemetery (1981) (Italian title: Quella villa accanto al cimitero)
- Heads I Win, Tails You Lose (1982) (Italian title: Testa o croce)
- The New Barbarians (1982) (Italian title: I Nuovi barbari, also known as Warriors of the Wasteland)
- Cuando calienta el sol... vamos a la playa (1982)
- Manhattan Baby (1982) (Italian title: L' Occhio del male)
- Mani di fata (1983)
- A Blade in the Dark (1983) (Italian title: La Casa con la scala nel buio)
- Demons (1985) (Italian title: Dèmoni)
