= Ana Caterina Morariu =

Romanian-born Italian actress (born 1980)

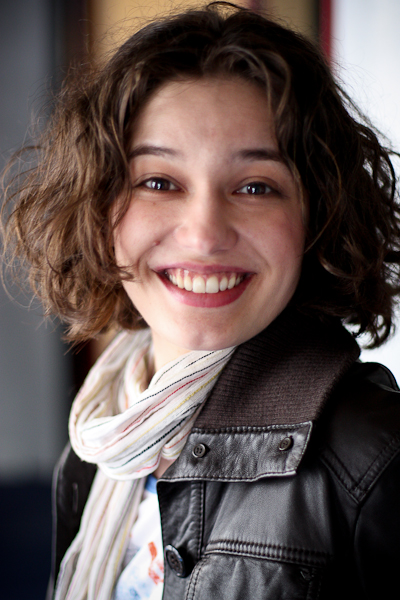
- Morariu in 2010
- Born: 20 November 1980 (age 45); Cluj-Napoca, Romania
- Education: Centro Sperimentale di Cinematografia
- Occupation: Actress
- Years active: 2002–present

Ana Caterina Morariu (born 20 November 1980) is a Romanian-born actress Italian naturalized.

== Life and career ==
Born in Cluj-Napoca, the daughter of the classic ballet dancer Marineta Rodica Rotaru, at a young age Morariu moved to Italy with her mother, living between Tuscany and Calabria. She graduated from the Centro Sperimentale di Cinematografia in Rome in 2002, and the same year she started her career on stage.

She became first known in 2004 through a series of roles in television series and TV movies. She appeared as Marie Cressay (fr) in the 2005 French miniseries Les Rois maudits. In 2006 she was nominated for David di Donatello in the "best actress" category for her performance in Carlo Verdone's Il mio miglior nemico.

Morariu played in The Salento Murders, a part-humorous two-episode 2010 detective TV show distributed by Eurochannel, directed by Antonello Grimaldi and starring Lino Banfi.
