= Brigitta Boccoli =

Italian film and television actress

- Born: 5 May 1972 (age 53); Rome, Italy
- Occupation: Actress
- Years active: 1982–present
- Height: 1.75 m (5 ft 9 in)
- Spouse: Stefano Nones Orfei
- Children: 2

Brigitta Boccoli (born 5 May 1972) is an Italian film and television actress.

== Biography ==
Brigitta Boccoli was born in 1972 in Rome where her family had moved from Milan shortly before her birth. Her sister, Benedicta Boccoli, is also an actress. Brigitta began her career in television with the show Pronto, chi gioca?, on which her sister Benedicta also worked. She works on television shows and occasionally as a fotonovela actress.

She participated with her sister Benedicta Boccoli at 1989 Sanremo Music Festival with the song "Stella".

== Personal life ==
She is married to circus athlete Stefano Nones Orfei (born 1966, son of Moira Orfei), who works at Reality Circus. They have two children named Manfredi and Brando. She considers herself Roman Catholic.

== Filmography ==
=== Cinema ===
Year	Film	Other notes
1982	Manhattan Baby	Directed by Lucio Fulci
1985	La ragazza dei lillà	Directed by Flavio Mogherini
1987	Com'è dura l'avventura	Directed by Flavio Mogherini
1991	Nostalgia di un piccolo grande amore	Directed by Antonio Bonifacio
2003	Gli angeli di Borsellino	Directed by Antonio Bonifacio
2006	Olé	Directed by Carlo Vanzina

=== Television ===
Year	Title	Notes
1987–1991	Domenica in	
2000–2001	Ricominciare	
2001	Una donna per amico	Season 3
2002	Cuori rubati	
2004	Don Matteo	Season 4, episode No. 23
2006	Reality Circus	reality show with Barbara D'Urso on Canale 5

=== Theatre ===
Year	Title	Other notes
1993–1994	Scanzonatissimo	Directed by Dino Verde
1998	Il gufo e la gattina	Directed by Furio Angiolella
1999	L'ultimo Tarzan	Directed by Sergio Japino
1999–2001	Il padre della sposa	Directed by Sergio Japino
2001	Anfitrione by Plautus	Directed by Michele Mirabella
2002	La schiava	Directed by Claudio Insegno
2002–2003	Uscirò dalla tua vita in taxi	Directed by Ennio Coltorti
2003	Il Paradiso può attendere	Directed by Anna Lenzi
2010	La mia miglior nemica	Directed by Cinzia Berni
