= Bari International Film Festival =

- Location: Bari, Italy
- Started: 2009
- Language: International
- Website: www.bifest.it

Bari International Film Festival (Bif&st) is an annual film festival held since 2009 in Bari, Italy.

== Sections ==
- International competition
- National competition
- Retrospectives of Italian and international cinema.
