= Vero =

Vero may refer to:

== Geography ==
- Vero Beach, Florida, a city in the United States
- Vero, Corse-du-Sud, a commune of France in Corsica

== Other ==
- Véro, a talk show on the Radio-Canada television network
- Vero (app), a social media company
- Vero Building Systems, a construction company
- Vero cell
- Vero man, Pleistocene-era human remains found near Vero Beach, Florida
- Vero Software Plc
- Vero (supermarket chain) in the Republic of Macedonia
- Vero, a candy brand owned by Barcel
- Vernon Richards, born Vero Recchioni, a twentieth century Anglo-Italian anarchist
- Vero Technologies Ltd, a former British manufacturing company
- Vero Insurance, an Australian insurance company
