= La Fureur (Canadian game show) =

- Created by: based on the French program created by Arthur
- Presented by: Véronique Cloutier (1998–2003); Sébastien Benoit (2003–2007)
- Country of origin: Canada
- Original language: French
- No. of seasons: 9
- No. of episodes: 250+

Production
- Executive producers: Véronique Cloutier; François Ferland
- Producers: Pierre Gagnon; Marco Lamontagne
- Running time: 60 min.
- Production companies: Guy Cloutier Productions; Novem Productions inc.

Original release
- Network: Radio-Canada
- Release: June 28, 1998 – December 31, 2007

La Fureur is a French-language Canadian game show that was broadcast live on the Radio-Canada television network from 1998 to 2007. It was based on the game show of the same name that was televised in France. As with the original version, the program featured two gender-segregated teams of celebrities answering questions and completing stunts pertaining to music. In addition, each episode had a special musical guest from the Québécois or international music scene, such as Annie Brocoli, Nana Mouskouri, Celine Dion and Ricky Martin, among others. All songs on the program were accompanied by karaoke-style on-screen lyrics, enabling viewers to sing along at home.

In addition, the show was simulcast on stations of the Énergie, RockDétente or Rythme FM radio networks (depending on season), as well as on local stations where these networks are not available.

The final broadcast of the original run of La Fureur was on December 31, 2007. A one-time special was presented on January 8, 2019 for the 20th anniversary of La Fureur, hosted by Véronique Cloutier. Its tremendous success led to another special a year later on January 4, 2020.

== Overview ==
The program was initially hosted by Véronique Cloutier and produced in Montreal at Studio 42 of Maison Radio-Canada by her father, Guy Cloutier.

At its height in popularity, La Fureur became one of the highest rated programs in Quebec with more than 1,200,000 viewers each week.

In addition to its weekly telecasts, La Fureur occasionally aired special episodes, such as Halloween, Christmas and New Year's Eve shows, and out-of-studio telecasts from Jarry Park and Bell Centre in Montreal, Colisée Pepsi in Quebec City, and Ottawa Civic Centre in Ottawa, Ontario. On November 18, 2000, Véronique Cloutier hosted a pre-recorded special episode from the set of the French version in Paris, playing by that version's rules.

In April 2003, Véronique Cloutier left the show to concentrate on her new talk show for Radio-Canada, Véro; her final show on April 27, 2003 was telecast live from the Bell Centre and featured Ricky Martin as special guest. She was replaced by Sébastien Benoit as host, beginning with the 2003–2004 season. Both Cloutier and Benoit co-hosted its 250th show, on January 27, 2007.

== Broadcast ==
La Fureur was originally broadcast Thursday nights on Radio-Canada at 8 PM local time (9 PM AT), later moving to Friday nights. On September 18, 2004 the show moved to Saturday nights at 6:30PM local (7:30PM AT), a move made possible after the cancellation of La Soirée du hockey (which generally began at 7PM ET). All episodes were telecast live from Ontario eastward; telecasts from Manitoba westward were electronically delayed for their time zones.
