= Mad for It =

British game show television series

- Genre: Game show
- Presented by: Mike McClean; Yiolanda Tokkallos (1998-99); Danielle Nicholls (2000); Nigel Mitchell (2000)
- Opening theme: "Harmonica Man" by Bravado
- Country of origin: United Kingdom
- Original language: English
- No. of series: 2
- No. of episodes: 39

Production
- Production location: Carlton Studios
- Running time: 25 minutes
- Production company: Carlton Television

Original release
- Network: ITV
- Release: 2 September 1998 – 31 March 2000

Mad for It is a British game show for children which was produced by Carlton Television broadcast on ITV from 2 September 1998 to 31 March 2000. Series 1 was hosted by former Nickelodeon presenters Mike McClean and Yiolanda Tokkallos. Series 2 was hosted by Mike McClean, Danielle Nicholls, and Nigel Mitchell. There was also a regular character called Pie Boy, played by Alex Verrey, who would go around hitting random people in the studio with flans in a manner like The Phantom Flan Flinger from Tiswas.

== Games in the show ==
Games included were:

- Stars Up Their Noses: Contestants are given 30 seconds to show their talent. The name of the game is derived from impersonation talent show Stars in Their Eyes. This competition was won at the end of the second series, by the then fifteen-year-old Katie Melua.
- Box Clever: Contestants answer questions and pick a prize from a box if correct.
- That's My Pet: Contestants need to guess which is their pet amongst several similar looking animals.

A frequent feature of Mad For It was "gunge", a green slimy goo which was regularly poured onto losing contestants and occasionally on the hosts themselves. Those who lost the games were sent to a "Dungeon of Gunge" – an enclosure directly beneath a large nose, which expelled gunge onto the hapless prisoners. In the last episode, the tables were turned and the pie boy ended up getting shoved in the dungeon.

The most notable contestant on Mad For It was Katie Melua, who appeared on the show when she was fifteen. She won the "Stars Up Their Noses" game after singing "Without You" by Badfinger. If she had lost the challenge, she would have been gunged.

The show was considered a parody of "adult programmes like Blind Date and Stars in their Eyes".

== Episode Guide ==
=== Series 1 ===
==== Episode 1 (2 September 1998) ====
- Musical guest: Five ("Everybody Get Up")

Backchat with the Bedheads
Stars Up Their Nose - Heat 1

Order	Act	Talent	Result
1	Acquiess	5-piece male rock band performing the song "Supersonic" by Oasis	Eliminated
2	Tom Fieldhouse	Unicycling and diablo juggling to "Harmonica Man" by Bravado	Heat Winner
3	Lucy Kingsnorth	Singing the song "Ain't That Just the Way" by Lutricia McNeal	Eliminated

How Far Will You Go?
That's My Pet

==== Episode 2 (9 September 1998) ====
- Musical guest: Ultra ("The Right Time")

Backchat with the Bedheads
Smarty Pants
Stars Up Their Nose - Heat 2

Order	Act	Talent	Result
1	Aaron Buckingham	Singing the song "No Matter What" by Boyzone	Eliminated
2	Bethanie Hooton	Dancing to "C'est la Vie" by B*Witched	Eliminated
3	Melanie Femi-Ola	Singing the song "How Do I Live" by LeAnn Rimes	Heat Winner

Make It a Date

- Prize: A day at the racetrack with Team McLaren

Boy	Result	Girl	Result
Dean	Not chosen	Lucinda	Not chosen
Dan	Not chosen	Rhian	Not chosen
Nick	Not chosen	Jo	Not chosen
David	Chosen	Sam	Chosen
James	Not chosen	Suzanne	Not chosen
Ian	Not chosen	Caroline	Not chosen

==== Episode 3 (16 September 1998) ====
- Musical guest: B*Witched ("Rollercoaster")

Backchat with the Bedheads
Stars Up Their Nose - Heat 3

Order	Act	Talent	Result
1	The Spice Boys	Dancing and miming the song "Wannabe" by Spice Girls	Eliminated
2	Instant Replay	4-piece girl group singing the song "Power of a Woman" by Eternal	Eliminated
3	Stephen and Michael	Line dancing to "Kung Fu Fighting" by Bus Stop and Carl Douglas	Heat Winner

Make It a Date

- Prize: A day at Zippo's Circus

Boy	Result	Girl	Result
Adam	Not chosen	Laura	Not chosen
Bobby	Not chosen	Donna	Not chosen
Andy	Not chosen	Marie Anne	Not chosen
Joe	Not chosen	Jenny	Not chosen
Ryan	Chosen	Tori	Not chosen
Daniel	Not chosen	Charlotte	Chosen

That's My Pet

==== Episode 4 (23 September 1998) ====
- Musical guest: Billie ("Girlfriend")

Backchat with the Bedheads
Sad or Bad?
Stars Up Their Nose - Semi Final 1

Order	Act	Winner of	Talent	Result
1	Tom Fieldhouse	Heat 1	Unicycling and diablo juggling to "Harmonica Man" by Bravado	Semi Final Winner
2	Melanie Femi-Ola	Heat 2	Singing the song "How Do I Live" by LeAnn Rimes	Eliminated
3	Stephen and Michael	Heat 3	Line dancing to "C'est la Vie" by B*Witched	Eliminated

How Far Will You Go?

== Transmissions ==
Series	Start date	End date	Episodes
1	2 September 1998	10 March 1999	26
2	7 January 2000	31 March 2000	13
