= La Fureur =

- Genre: Comedy panel game
- Presented by: Arthur (1995-2000); Véronique Cloutier (2001); Nikos Aliagas (2002–2003); Alexandre Devoise (2007)
- Country of origin: France
- Original language: French

Production
- Running time: 120 minutes
- Production company: Grundy Productions

Original release
- Network: France 2 (1995-1996); TF1 (1996-2003); W9 (2007)
- Release: 31 December 1995 – 1 November 2007

La Fureur is a French music game show, first aired by France 2 on 31 December 1995.

Created by French television personality Arthur, the show features two teams of celebrity contestants, segregated by gender, playing various music-related games and stunts. One notable element of La Fureur is its karaoke feature, where viewers at home are invited to sing along with the contestants, and even musical guests, by singing to the lyrics displayed on the screen.

After its short run on France 2, TF1 picked up the series later in 1996, and carried it through December 31, 2000. Arthur was the host for both the France 2 and TF1 series. Many episodes are generally 120 to 145 minutes in length.

The show was revived by music channel W9 in 2007, as La Fureur, le retour. Alexandre Devoise was the host of this new version. Unlike the original run, le retour does not include a karaoke feature—only questions pertaining to music.

== International versions ==
Country	Title	Broadcaster	Presenter(s)	Premiere	Finale
France (original format)	La Fureur	France 2 (1995–1996); TF1 (1996–2003); W9 (2007)	Arthur (1995–2000); Véronique Cloutier (2001); Nikos Aliagas (2002–2003); Alexandre Devoise (2007)	31 December 1995	1 November 2007
Canada; Belgium (Wallonia)	La Fureur	Télévision de Radio-Canada; Plug RTL	Véronique Cloutier (1998–2003); Sébastien Benoît (2003–2007)	28 June 1998	31 December 2007
Spain	Furor	Antena 3 (1998–2001); FORTA (2006)	Alonso Caparrós	3 October 1998	17 May 2006
Portugal	Furor	SIC	Bárbara Guimarães and Miguel Dias; Ana Marques	1998	2000; 2001
Italy	Furore	Rai 2	Alessandro Greco (1997–2002); Daniele Bossari with Giacomo "Ciccio" Valenti (2003); Alessandro Greco and Gigi & Ross (2017)	16 May 1997	28 June 2017
United Kingdom	Night Fever	Channel 5	Suggs	5 April 1997	30 March 2002
