= Night Fever (game show) =

- Genre: Music game show
- Created by: Arthur
- Presented by: Suggs
- Country of origin: United Kingdom
- Original language: English
- No. of series: 5
- No. of episodes: 135

Production
- Running time: 60 minutes (inc. adverts)
- Production companies: Grundy UK (1997–2001); Thames Television (2001–02)

Original release
- Network: Channel 5
- Release: 5 April 1997 – 30 March 2002

Night Fever was a karaoke style show airing in the United Kingdom on Channel 5 from 5 April 1997 to 30 March 2002. It was hosted by Suggs and in the early series, he was helped by "The Big Guy in the Sky" – a disembodied voice giving the scores, and later by 'Wolfie' – John Ireland dressed as Mozart. Later series were co-hosted by Will Mellor and Sarah Cawood replaced later by Kieron Elliott and Danielle Nicholls. The programme often had themed shows such as Valentine's Day. Also, Suggs was helped (or often hindered) by Pop Monkey (a man in a costume) who supposedly gave Suggs the choices of songs.

== Format ==
Two panels of celebrities faced a boys against girls singing contest together with quiz questions and interaction from the audience. Team captains in the early series were Craig Charles and Philippa Forrester, who were working together on BBC Two's show, Robot Wars. Special guest stars made appearances as well – these included Gary Numan, Labi Siffre and Limahl from Kajagoogoo. The format was re-developed from the French show – La Fureur (The Fury) hosted and devised by Arthur – by Richard Hearsey who produced the show for Channel 5. Dawn Airey had seen the French version of the show and both Richard Hearsey and Alan Boyd travelled to Marseilles to see a live version prior to re-developing the show for Channel 5.

== Transmissions ==
| Series | Start date | End date | Episodes |
|---|---|---|---|
| 1 | 5 April 1997 | 17 January 1998 | 33 |
| 2 | 12 September 1998 | 20 February 1999 | 26 |
| 3 | 18 September 1999 | 26 February 2000 | 26 |
| 4 | 14 October 2000 | 10 March 2001 | 24 |
| 5 | 22 September 2001 | 30 March 2002 | 26 |
