= The Floor (French game show) =

The Floor, à la conquête du sol (literally "The Floor, conquering the floor") is a French game show based on the international franchise The Floor. Presented by Cyril Féraud, the show was first broadcast on France 2 on 30 December 2023.

== History ==
The Floor, created by John de Mol Jr., originated in the Netherlands, where it achieved audience shares of 22%. In January 2023, production company Talpa agreed a deal with Satisfaction, owned by French presenter Arthur, for an adaptation to be broadcast on France 2. In June 2023, Cyril Féraud was announced as host.

The first episode of the show on 30 December 2023 had 3.261 million viewers, or 17.3% of the audience. At the end of its four-episode first season on 20 January 2024, it had 2.922 million viewers and 16.9% of the audience.

== Format ==
The French version of the show is largely the same as the Dutch original, with a major difference being its two-hour run time compared to the original running between 45 and 60 minutes.

One hundred contestants start the series on a square divided ten-by-ten. They each have a specialist subject. A contestant is chosen to duel against a neighbour, on the neighbour's specialist subject. They have to name examples of that subject from photographs. The winner takes the square of the loser, who is eliminated. The winner of the entire series wins €100,000.
