= Mike McClean =

British television presenter

Mike McClean is a British stand up comedian, television presenter and actor. He was a roving reporter on Richard & Judy and The Big Breakfast and appeared in The Office, Shameless, and My Mad Fat Diary.

== Career ==
He attended the Arden School of Theatre before going on to study at the Contact Youth Theatre. McClean spent 2 years at drama school and left to pursue his dream of acting and comedy.

McClean started presenting on Nickelodeon. He presented for other children's television shows such as It's Not Fair and wrote Mad for It for ITV. He then presented for daytime shows, including Richard & Judy. In 2003, McClean appeared in the Christmas special of The Office.

McClean hosted the XFM Manchester Breakfast Show between June 2008 and 2009. In 2013 he played Fin's dad in the Channel 4 series My Mad Fat Diary. In 2016, he provided the voice-over for Watchdog Test House. Mike played Father Tony in Shameless.

He is now a regular in pantomime at the Ipswich Regent Theatre and first made an appearance as Buttons in Cinderella in 2014.

In August 2019 McClean and his co-presenter Nigel Clucas were fired from their role as podcast presenters and match day entertainers at football club Manchester City FC. In the podcast McClean and Clucas made remarks in a stereotypically Chinese accent based on a fictitious character - 'Mr Wong' - in a skit regarding City's late arrival in China for their pre-season tour.
