= The Floor (Australian game show) =

- Genre: Game show
- Created by: John de Mol
- Based on: The Floor
- Presented by: Rodger Corser
- Country of origin: Australia
- Original language: English
- No. of seasons: 2
- No. of episodes: 19

Production
- Camera setup: Multi-camera
- Running time: 55 minutes
- Production companies: Eureka Productions; Talpa

Original release
- Network: Nine Network
- Release: 28 April 2025 – present

The Floor is a game show that premiered on Nine Network on 28 April 2025. It is currently being hosted by Rodger Corser. The series is an adaptation of the Dutch format created by John de Mol. Contestants challenge adjacent opponents in timed duels, aiming to take over their opponents' squares and expand their own territory. The game progresses as players choose opponents and categories, with the ultimate goal of controlling the entire floor to win the grand prize of $200,000.

The first season featured 81 contestants on a 9x9 grid. On 24 October 2024, it was announced that Nine had ordered the series' first season at their 2025 upfronts. Nine began applications for the second season's casting on 20 May 2025 after the success of the first. The second season premiered on 19 April 2026 with the same host. A third season was announced in September 2026 which will premiere in 2027.

== Format ==
Contestants stand on separate square spaces of a large grid on the studio floor (a 9x9 grid). Each contestant has a category in which they feel particularly knowledgeable.

One contestant is chosen at random (via "The Randomizer") to be a challenger and shown the categories of all opponents whose territories share at least one side with their own, then chooses one of them to challenge face-to-face in a head-to-head duel. The specifics of the duel remain undisclosed until the challenger selects an opponent, with the format defaulting to visual unless specified otherwise by the host. The two contestants take turns identifying a series of images or words associated with the challenged opponent's category. They are each given separate 45-second clocks, only one of which runs at any given time, starting with the challenger. The contestant in control must give a correct answer in order to stop their clock and turn control over to their opponent. Infinite guesses are allowed without penalty, and a contestant may pass whenever desired; however, they must wait three seconds for a new image or text to be shown. Some categories are text-based, requiring contestants to perform tasks such as filling in the missing word(s) of a book title or song lyric, or naming the movie from which a famous quote is taken. Once a category has been selected and played, it is permanently removed from play and cannot be chosen again. In the second season, video duels are added which show videos as clues and audio duels, which are sound focused duels, and use images as hints as well to keep turn order.

The first contestant to run out of time is eliminated from the game and gives up all of their territory to the winner, who inherits the challenger's category or keeps their own (if the challenger). The winner may then either challenge another opponent or return to the grid; in the latter case, a new contestant is selected as a challenger at random from those who have not yet played a duel. Once all the remaining contestants have played a duel at least once, everyone becomes eligible for selection as a challenger. When only two contestants remain, the final duel is played as a best-of-three, with the first contestant to win two rounds declared the champion. Each remaining category is used for one of the first two rounds only.. The contestant holding more territory decides the order of the final two categories. Each player alternates turn order: one goes first in Round 1 and second in Round 2, while the opponent does the opposite. If a third round is required, the contestant holding more territory decides from a list of three mystery categories not revealed until after the first two duels as the tiebreaker and goes first in the tiebreaker round.

The game progresses over the course of a season with the grand prize awarded to the player who ultimately controls the entire floor. Secondary prizes are awarded throughout the season to the player with the most territory at the end of each episode after a certain number of duels(nine in season one). At the end of each episode, apart from the final episode, the contestant holding the most territory wins $10,000 (increased to $20,000 in season 2 for the first episode only). In the event of a tie, the leaders share the money equally. The last contestant standing at the end of the final episode of the season takes over the entire floor and wins the grand prize of $200,000. The overall prize pot for the first season is $280,000. In the second season, the overall prize pot was increased to $300,000.

Contestants who achieve three consecutive duel victories (by electing to play on twice after a win) are awarded a five-second "Time Boost." This bonus can be added once to the contestant's clock at the start of any subsequent duel, with the exception of the final three-part duel, in which the Time Boost is not permitted and therefore removed from play. A contestant in possession of a Time Boost must elect to use it before a duel starts before beginning to earn another. If a duel is won with a Time Boost, it is counted as the first win towards another.

In the second season, "The Freeze" is introduced. The player who has won the most duels after the fifth episode of the season will have their territory frozen and cannot be challenged until everyone on The Floor has played one duel.

== Results by contestant ==
Original categories are listed first & shown in boldface. Inherited categories are listed after the original category without boldface. A hyphen indicates a more specific topic in the associated category. The specific topic is italicized. Parentheses indicate what a category refers to if a colloquial phrase or additional notes about a topic; it also specifies the category's style of play if specified to be non-visual or text-based (audio, association, etc.). [] Brackets indicate the remaining words of a topic that have had their title shortened. A cyan square number means that contestant earned the territory freeze.

=== Season 1 ===
Results (Season 1)
Name	Job	City	Age	Category	Space Assignment	Duels	Duels Played	Episodes Won	Exited
Beth Carroll	Executive Assistant	Canberra, ACT	38	**Kids' Movies**	72	1. Kids' Movies - Janaye defeats Beth (Ep. 1)	1	N/A	Episode 1
Desiree	IT Business Partner	Darwin, NT	40	**Reality TV**	29	2. Reality TV - Issac defeats Desiree (Ep. 1)	1	N/A	Episode 1
Natasha Jacobs	Administration / Actor	Melbourne, VIC	39	**Top TV Series**	16	3. Shoes - Angus defeats Natasha (Ep. 1)	1	N/A	Episode 1
Jennifer	Retired Bank Manager	Perth, WA	68	**Capital Cities**	35	4. Fruits - Shawna defeats Jennifer (Ep. 1)	1	N/A	Episode 1
Shawna Pope	Admin Officer	Brisbane, QLD	23	**Fruits**; Capital Cities	44	4. Fruits - Shawna defeats Jennifer (Ep. 1); 5. Bands - Georgia defeats Shawna (Ep. 1)	2	N/A	Episode 1
Georgia Walsh	Fashion Account Manager	Sydney, NSW	28	**Bands**; Capital Cities	53	5. Bands - Georgia defeats Shawna (Ep. 1); 6. Dogs - Melanie defeats Georgia (Ep. 1)	2	N/A	Episode 1
Melanie Young	Dog Groomer	Tamworth, NSW	22	**Dogs**; Capital Cities	34	6. Dogs - Melanie defeats Georgia (Ep. 1); 7. Celebrations - Sheena defeats Melanie (Ep. 1)	2	N/A	Episode 1
Jesse Lane	Cafe Manager	Gold Coast, Queensland	36	**Cartoon Characters**	56	8. Aussie Tucker - Andrew defeats Jesse (Ep. 1)	1	N/A	Episode 1
Nicho	Sports Marketing	Melbourne, VIC	26	**Flags**	45	9. Capital Cities - Sheena defeats Nicho (Ep. 1)	1	N/A	Episode 1
Jules Robinson	Entrepreneur	Sydney, NSW	42	**Babies**	54	10. Babies - Sheena defeats Jules (Ep. 2)	1	N/A	Episode 2
Sheena Geiger	Former Teacher	Mackay, QLD	42	**Celebrations**; Capital Cities; Flags	43	7. Celebrations - Sheena defeats Melanie (Ep. 1); 9. Capital Cities - Sheena defeats Nicho (Ep. 2); 10. Babies - Sheena defeats Jules (Ep. 2); 11. Famous Characters - Sophie defeats Sheena (Ep. 2)	4	Episode 1; 6 spaces ($10,000)	Episode 2
Angus G	Student	Melbourne, VIC	23	**Shoes**; Top TV Series	7	3. Shoes - Angus defeats Natasha (Ep. 1); 12. Top TV Series - Sophie defeats Angus (Ep. 2)	2	N/A	Episode 2
Gill	Financial Crime Officer	Melbourne, VIC	30	**Brands**	24	13. Brands - Sophie defeats Gill (Ep. 2)	1	N/A	Episode 2
Aaron Farquhar	Truck Driver	Sydney, NSW	37	**Car Logos**	11	14. Logie Winners - Issac defeats Aaron (Ep. 2)	1	N/A	Episode 2
Dylan Butcher	Media Advisor	Lismore, NSW	26	**Aussie Pollies**	19	15. Aussie Pollies - Issac defeats Dylan (Ep. 2)	1	N/A	Episode 2
Issac Budde	Media Intern	Dee Why, NSW	21	**Logie Winners**; Car Logos	20	2. Reality TV - Issac defeats Desiree (Ep. 1); 14. Logie Winners - Issac defeats Aaron (Ep. 2); 15. Aussie Pollies - Issac defeats Dylan (Ep. 2); 16. Countries - Ryan defeats Issac (Ep. 2)	4	N/A	Episode 2
Ryan Kwame	Retail Sales	Perth, WA	29	**Countries**; Car Logos	21	16. Countries - Ryan defeats Issac (Ep. 2); 17. Aussie Sport Heroes - Darren defeats Ryan (Ep. 2)	2	N/A	Episode 2
Cory Paterson	Account Manager	Perth, WA	37	**Ball Games**	79	18. Ball Games - Shez defeats Cory (Ep. 2)	1	N/A	Episode 2
Christina	Teacher	Bairnsdale, VIC	64	**Birds**	10	19. Birds - Flynn defeats Christina (Ep. 3)	1	N/A	Episode 3
Darren Chadwick	Claims Handler	Melbourne, VIC	42	**Aussie Sport Heroes**; Car Logos	30	17. Aussie Sport Heroes - Darren defeats Ryan (Ep. 2); 20. Car Logos - Flynn defeats Darren (Ep. 3)	2	N/A	Episode 3
Flynn Kellenbach	Neuroscience Student	Melbourne, VIC	19	**Child's Play** (Kids' Activities)	1	19. Birds - Flynn defeats Christina (Ep. 3); 20. Car Logos - Flynn defeats Darren (Ep. 3); 21. Anatomy - Georgie defeats Flynn (Ep. 3)	3	N/A	Episode 3
Shonagh Mass	Healthcare Project Manager	Melbourne, VIC	40	**Aussie Landmarks**	31	22. Aussie Landmarks - Georgie defeats Shonagh (Ep. 3)	1	N/A	Episode 3
Georgie Applebee	Theatre Nurse	Brisbane, QLD	21	**Anatomy**; Child's Play (Kids' Activities)	22	21. Anatomy - Georgie defeats Flynn (Ep. 3); 22. Aussie Landmarks - Georgie defeats Shonagh (Ep. 3); 23. Text Talk - Esther defeats Georgie (Ep. 3)	3	N/A	Episode 3
Andrew Whitehead	Scrap Metal Artist	Urana, NSW	66	**Aussie Tucker**; Cartoon Characters	65	8. Aussie Tucker - Andrew defeats Jesse (Ep. 1); 24. Cartoon Characters - Raechel defeats Andrew (Ep. 3)	2	N/A	Episode 3
Callum Newman	Investment Researcher	Frankston, VIC	42	**Aussie Films**	57	25. Water Creatures - Kristy defeats Callum (Ep. 3)	1	N/A	Episode 3
Jack Hale	Tech Sales Rep	Sydney, NSW	32	**Slogans (Marketing)**	39	26. Child's Play - Esther defeats Jack (Ep. 3)	1	N/A	Episode 3
Natasha (Tash) Abrahams	Occupational Therapist	Melbourne, VIC	33	**Bathroom**	5	27. Technology - Bok Choi defeats Tash (Ep. 3)	1	N/A	Episode 3
Zane Crawley	Carpenter	Cronulla, NSW	25	**Tools**	61	28. Tools - Kieren defeats Zane (Ep. 4)	1	N/A	Episode 4
Kieren Glass	Photographer	Melbourne, VIC	26	**Vegetables**	60	28. Tools - Kieren defeats Zane (Ep. 4); 29. BBQ - Amina defeats Kieren (Ep. 4)	2	N/A	Episode 4
Carly Wallace	Small Business Owner	Brisbane, QLD	39	**Hit Songs**	18	30. Comedians - Luke defeats Carly (Ep. 4)	1	N/A	Episode 4
Luke	Teaching Assist	Bronte, NSW	28	**Comedians**; Hit Songs	27	30. Comedians - Luke defeats Carly (Ep. 4); 31. Drinks - David defeats Luke (Ep. 4)	2	N/A	Episode 4
Sophie Bracks	Marketing & Comms	Cronulla, NSW	35	**Famous Characters**; Flags	25	11. Famous Characters - Sophie defeats Sheena; 12. Top TV Series - Sophie defeats Angus (Ep. 2); 13. Brands - Sophie defeats Gill (Ep. 2); 32. Flags - David defeats Sophie (Ep. 4)	4	Episode 2; 11 spaces ($10,000)	Episode 4
David	Sustainability Manager	Melbourne, VIC	31	**Drinks**; Hit Songs	36	31. Drinks - David defeats Luke (Ep. 4); 32. Flags - David defeats Sophie (Ep. 4); 33. Tennis Legends - Steven defeats David (Ep. 4)	3	N/A	Episode 4
Mikey Gelo	Influencer & Accountant	Sydney, NSW	38	**Scary Movies**	64	34. Scary Movies - Ella defeats Mikey (Ep. 4)	1	N/A	Episode 4
Emily Cooper	Fashion Retail	Gold Coast, QLD	25	**Quotes**	51	35. Quotes - Paul defeats Emily (Ep. 4)	1	N/A	Episode 4
Suzanne Bellette	Teacher	Jervis Bay, NSW	59	**Home Décor**	3	36. Creepy Crawlies - Cornell defeats Suzanne (Ep. 4)	1	N/A	Episode 4
Laura Byrne	Stay-at-home Mum	Wollongong, NSW	44	**Kids' Books**	32	37. Slogans - Esther defeats Laura (Ep. 5)	1	N/A	Episode 5
Daniel Steven	Marketing Manager	Melbourne, VIC	36	**Plants**	9	38. Plants - Kale defeats Daniel (Ep. 5)	1	N/A	Episode 5
Rebecca Mulinello	Opera Singer	Melbourne, VIC	24	**Musical Movies**	28	39. Kitchen Drawer - Amy defeats Rebecca (Ep. 5)	1	N/A	Episode 5
Amy-Louise Kelley	Social Worker	Harrison, ACT	50	**Kitchen Drawer**; Musical Movies	37	39. Kitchen Drawer - Amy defeats Rebecca (Ep. 5); 40. Historical Events - Rory defeats Amy (Ep. 5)	2	N/A	Episode 5
Charlie	Marketing Manager	Darwin, NT	53	**80's Blockbusters**	12	41. Kids' Books - Esther defeats Charlie (Ep. 5)	1	N/A	Episode 5
Esther Lam	Digital Marketing Business Owner	Sydney, NSW	33	**Text Talk**; Child's Play (Kids' Activities); Slogans (Marketing); Kids' Books; 80's Blockbusters	40	23. Text Talk - Esther defeats Georgie (Ep. 3); 26. Child's Play - Esther defeats Jack (Ep. 3); 37. Slogans - Esther defeats Laura (Ep. 5); 41. Kids' Books - Esther defeats Charlie (Ep. 5); 42. Home Decor - Cornell defeats Esther (Ep. 5)	5	Episode 3; 12 spaces ($10,000)	Episode 5
Cornell Hanxomphou	Environmental Rights Officer	Canberra, ACT	30	**Creepy Crawlies**; Home Decor	2	36. Creepy Crawlies - Cornell defeats Suzanne (Ep. 4); 42. Home Decor - Cornell defeats Esther (Ep. 5); 43. Appliances - Ruth defeats Cornell (Ep. 5)	3	N/A	Episode 5
Kristy Steindl	Civil Engineer	Yeppoon, QLD	32	**Water Creatures**; Aussie Films	58	25. Water Creatures - Kristy defeats Callum (Ep. 3); 44. Aussie Films - Duncan defeats Kristy (Ep. 5)	2	N/A	Episode 5
Steven Bishop	Town Planner	Melbourne, VIC	38	**Tennis Legends**; Hit Songs	62	33. Tennis Legends - Steven defeats David (Ep. 4); 45. Hit Songs - Chris defeats Steven (Ep. 5)	2	Episode 4; 15 spaces ($10,000)	Episode 5
Renusha Nair	Lawyer	Don, TAS	33	**World Landmarks**	77	46. World Landmarks - Dougie defeats Renusha (Ep. 6)	1	N/A	Episode 6
Chris Endrey	Stay-at-home Dad	Canberra, ACT	39	**Primary Maths**	63	45. Hit Songs - Chris defeats Steven (Ep. 5); 47. Primary Maths - Kate defeats Chris (Ep. 6)	2	N/A	Episode 6
Bok Choi	Software Engineer and Drag Queen	Sydney, NSW	35	**Technology**; Bathroom	14	27. Technology - Bok Choi defeats Tash (Ep. 3); 48. Bathroom - Patrick defeats Bok Choi (Ep. 6)	2	N/A	Episode 6
Myles Keith	Famer & Engineer	Elmhurst, VIC	23	**Transport**	46	49. Confectionery - Raechel defeats Myles (Ep. 6)	1	N/A	Episode 6
Rick Bakker	Pet Sitter	Brisbane, QLD	60	**Famous Duos**	67	50. Professions - Dougie defeats Rick (Ep. 6)	1	N/A	Episode 6
Clancy Sinnamon	Videographer	Rochedale, QLD	28	**Aussie Slang**	68	51. Aussie Slang - Dougie defeats Clancy (Ep. 6)	1	N/A	Episode 6
Dougie Clarke	Recruitment	Perth, WA	32	**Professions**; Famous Duos	76	46. World Landmarks - Dougie defeats Renusha (Ep. 6); 50. Professions - Dougie defeats Rick (Ep. 6); 51. Aussie Slang - Dougie defeats Clancy (Ep. 6); 52. Sports Gear - Jono defeats Dougie (Ep. 6)	4	N/A	Episode 6
Angus Shephard	Chemist	Townsville, QLD	29	**Periodic Table**	41	53. Songs About Places - Paul defeats Angus (Ep. 6)	1	N/A	Episode 6
Nicole Drill	Condiment Company Owner	Geelong, VIC	42	**Herbs & Spices**	49	54. 80's Blockbusters - Ruth defeats Nicole (Ep. 6)	1	N/A	Episode 6
Lara Kocsis	Cinema Attendant	Sydney, NSW	22	**Celebrity Couples**	23	55. Pasta - Kate defeats Lara (Ep. 7)	1	N/A	Episode 7
Shez Smith	Tradie	Blairgowrie, VIC	41	**Clothes**	78	18. Ball Games - Shez defeats Cory (Ep. 2); 56. Clothes - Angela defeats Shez (Ep. 7)	2	N/A	Episode 7
Don	Financial Services Lawyer	Melbourne, VIC	32	**History Makers**	15	57. Instruments - Patrick defeats Don (Ep. 7)	1	N/A	Episode 7
Andy Jay Rodriguez	Heavy Machine Operator	Tenambit, NSW	32	**Boy Bands**	26	58. Celebrity Couples - Kate defeats Andy (Ep. 7)	1	N/A	Episode 7
Jan-Willem Donders	Project Manager	Drouin, VIC	51	**Soccer Stars**	42	59. Boy Bands - Kate defeats Jan (Ep. 7)	1	N/A	Episode 7
Raechel Anderson	Office Manager	Yarrawonga, VIC	46	**Confectionery**; Transport	55	24. Cartoon Characters - Raechel defeats Andrew (Ep. 3); 49. Confectionery - Raechel defeats Myles (Ep. 6); 60. Transport - Monica defeats Raechel (Ep. 7)	3	N/A	Episode 7
Dusty Ward	Farm Hand	Roxby Downs, SA	24	**Farming**	81	61. Desserts - Janaye defeats Dusty (Ep. 7)	1	N/A	Episode 7
Angela Facchini	Fashion Designer	Sydney, NSW	60	**Fashion Icons**	80	56. Clothing - Angela defeats Shez (Ep. 7); 62. Fashion Icons - Janaye defeats Angela (Ep. 7)	2	N/A	Episode 7
Ruth de Barra	Full Time Mum	Ballarat, VIC	51	**Appliances**; 80's Blockbusters; Herbs & Spices	13	43. Appliances - Ruth defeats Cornell (Ep. 5); 54. 80's Blockbusters - Ruth defeats Nicole (Ep. 6); 63. Herbs & Spices - Ashley defeats Ruth (Ep. 7)	3	Episode 5; 17 spaces Episode 6; 18 spaces ($20,000)	Episode 7
Cora Henderson	Visual Merchandiser	Sydney, NSW	25	**Mobile Apps**	75	64. Mobile Apps - Kireth defeats Cora (Ep. 8)	1	N/A	Episode 8
Ally Dickerson	Hairdresser	Sunshine Coast, Queensland	22	**Toddler Tales**	66	65. Bestsellers - Monica defeats Ally (Ep. 8)	1	N/A	Episode 8
Janaye Emily	Bartender	Sydney, NSW	25	**Desserts**; Farming	71	1. Kids' Movies - Janaye defeats Beth (Ep. 1); 61. Desserts - Janaye defeats Dusty (Ep. 7); 62. Fashion Icons - Janaye defeats Angela (Ep. 7); 66. Farming - Benny defeats Janaye (Ep. 8)	4	N/A	Episode 8
Benny Bradley	Wildlife Specialist	Yarragon, VIC	42	**Aussie Wildlife**	70	66. Farming - Benny defeats Janaye (Ep. 8); 67. Soccer Stars - Kate defeats Benny (Ep. 8)	2	N/A	Episode 8
Michelle Hughes	Construction	Campbelltown, NSW	41	**World Food**	52	68. Aussie Wildlife - Kate defeats Michelle (Ep. 8)	1	N/A	Episode 8
Stuart Chisholm	Communications Manager	Melbourne, VIC	56	**Gold Medallists**	17	69. World Food - Kate defeats Stuart (Ep. 8)	1	N/A	Episode 8
Paul Bakker	IT Contractor	Brisbane, QLD	60	**Songs About Places**; Periodic Table	50	35. Quotes - Paul defeats Emily (Ep. 4); 53. Songs About Places - Paul defeats Angus (Ep. 6); 70. Famous Duos - Jono defeats Paul (Ep. 8)	3	N/A	Episode 8
Jono Lui	Firefighter	Torquay, VIC	39	**Sports Gear**; Famous Duos	59	52. Sports Gear - Jono defeats Dougie (Ep. 6); 70. Famous Duos - Jono defeats Paul (Ep. 8); 71. Gold Medalists - Kate defeats Jono (Ep. 8)	3	N/A	Episode 8
Rory Kelly	Project Manager	Canberra, ACT	32	**Historical Events**; Musical Movies	38	40. Historical Events - Rory defeats Amy (Ep. 5); 72. Toddler Tales - Monica defeats Rory (Ep. 8)	2	N/A	Episode 8
Kale Frost	LEGO Artist	Melbourne, VIC	46	**Toys**	8	38. Plants - Kale defeats Daniel (Ep. 5); 73. Periodic Table - Kate defeats Kale (Ep. 9)	2	N/A	Episode 9
Ella Crossingham	Makeup Artist	Queensland	23	**Beauty**	73	34. Scary Movies - Ella defeats Mikey (Ep. 4); 74. Musical Movies - Monica defeats Ella (Ep. 9)	2	N/A	Episode 9
Ashley David Greenhalgh	Digital Designer	Brisbane, QLD	28	**Girl Groups**	4	63. Herbs & Spices - Ashley defeats Ruth (Ep. 7); 75. Toys - Kate defeats Ashley (Ep. 9)	2	N/A	Episode 9
Kate Paterson	Citizenship Consultant	Melbourne, VIC	36	**Pasta**; Celebrity Couples; Boy Bands; Soccer Stars; Aussie Wildlife; World Food; Gold Medalists; Periodic Table; Toys; Girl Groups	33	47. Primary Maths - Kate defeats Chris (Ep. 6); 55. Pasta - Kate defeats Lara (Ep. 7); 58. Celebrity Couples - Kate defeats Andy (Ep. 7); 59. Boy Bands - Kate defeats Jan (Ep. 7); 67. Soccer Stars - Kate defeats Benny (Ep. 8); 68. Aussie Wildlife - Kate defeats Michelle (Ep. 8); 69. World Food - Kate defeats Stuart (Ep. 8); 71. Gold Medalists - Kate defeats Jono (Ep. 8); 73. Periodic Table - Kate defeats Kale (Ep. 9); 75. Toys - Kate defeats Ashley (Ep. 9); 76. Girl Groups - Patrick defeats Kate (Ep. 9)	11	Episode 7; 20 spaces Episode 8; 37 spaces ($20,000)	Episode 9
Kireth Sandu	Marketing	Sydney, NSW	24	**Sci-Fi -** Characters	74	64. Mobile Apps - Kireth defeats Cora (Ep. 8); 77. Beauty - Monica defeats Kireth (Ep. 9)	2	N/A	Episode 9
Duncan Currie	Maths and Design Student	Acton, ACT	23	**Games Night**	48	44. Aussie Films - Duncan defeats Kristy (Ep. 5); 78. Sci-Fi - Monica defeats Duncan (Ep. 9)	2	N/A	Episode 9
Monica Carmichael	Librarian	Brisbane, QLD	31	**Bestsellers**; Toddler Tales; Musical Movies; Beauty; Sci-Fi - Characters; Games Night	47	60. Transport - Monica defeats Raechel (Ep. 7); 65. Bestsellers - Monica defeats Ally (Ep. 8); 72. Toddler Tales - Monica defeats Rory (Ep. 8); 74. Musical Movies - Monica defeats Ella (Ep. 9); 77. Beauty - Monica defeats Kireth (Ep. 9); 78. Sci-Fi - Monica defeats Duncan (Ep. 9); 79. Games Night - Patrick defeats Monica (Ep. 9)	7	N/A	Episode 9
Amina Elshafei	Nurse	West Pennant Hills, NSW	40	**BBQ**; Veggies	69	29. BBQ - Amina defeats Kieren (Ep. 4); 80. History Makers - Patrick defeats Amina (0-1) (Ep. 9); 81. Veggies - Amina defeats Patrick (1-1) (Ep. 9); 82. World Leaders - Patrick defeats Amina (1-2) (Ep. 9)	4	N/A	Episode 9
Patrick Neasey	Engineer	Hobart, Tasmania	33	**Instruments**; History Makers	6	48. Bathroom - Patrick defeats Bok Choi (Ep. 6); 57. Instruments - Patrick defeats Don (Ep. 7); 76. Girl Groups - Patrick defeats Kate (Ep. 9); 79. Games Night - Patrick defeats Monica (Ep. 9); 80. History Makers - Patrick defeats Amina (1-0) (Ep. 9); 81. Veggies - Amina defeats Patrick (1-1) (Ep. 9); 82. World Leaders - Patrick defeats Amina (2-1) (Ep. 9)	7	**Season Winner** **($200,000)**	

=== Season 2 ===
Results (Season 2)
Name	Job	City	Age	Category	Space Assignment	Duels	Duels Played	Episodes Won	Exited
Sinead	Business Owner	Perth, WA	35	**Iconic Movie Lines**	26	1. Iconic Movie Lines - Ben defeats Sinead (Ep. 1)	1	N/A	Episode 1
Ciska	Community Support Worker	Victoria	67	**Cinema Classics**	46	2. Baby Animals - Elise defeats Ciska (Ep. 1)	1	N/A	Episode 1
Cathal Leslie	Economist	Perth, WA	29	**Podcasters**	31	3. Roman Numerals - Raph defeats Cathal (Ep. 1)	1	N/A	Episode 1
Raph Regala	Supermarket Manager	Atherton, QLD	28	**Roman Numerals**; Podcasters	32	3. Roman Numerals - Raph defeats Cathal (Ep. 1); 4. Cheese - Emma defeats Raph (Ep. 1)	2	N/A	Episode 1
Ella Rossanis	Baker & Copywriter	Sydney, NSW	39	**Bakery**	73	5. Bakery - Peta-Pearl defeats Ella (Ep. 1)	1	N/A	Episode 1
Scott G	Miner	Bundaberg, QLD	36	**Aussie Towns**	11	6. Action Flicks - Inia defeats Scott (Ep. 1)	1	N/A	Episode 1
Stav Davidson	Radio Host	Brisbane, QLD	47	**Rom Coms**	65	7. Rom Coms - Jess defeats Stav (Ep. 1)	1	N/A	Episode 1
Peta-Pearl Politis	Healer	Melbourne, VIC	34	**Gemstones**	64	5. Bakery - Peta-Pearl defeats Ella (Ep. 1); 8. Gemstones - Jess defeats Peta-Pearl (Ep. 1)	2	N/A	Episode 1
Grace Koh	Customer Service	Victoria	29	**Brides**	71	9. Winter Sports - Steven defeats Grace (Ep. 2)	1	N/A	Episode 2
Steven Bradbury	Winter Olympian	Brisbane, QLD	52	**Winter Sports**; Brides	70	9. Winter Sports - Steven defeats Grace (Ep. 2); 10. World Champs - JJ defeats Steven (Ep. 2)	2	N/A	Episode 2
JJ Miller	Sushi Company Co-Owner	Melbourne, VIC	27	**World Champs**; Brides	62	10. World Champs - JJ defeats Steven (Ep. 2); 11. Road Signs - Elliot defeats JJ (Ep. 2)	2	N/A	Episode 2
Sarah	Tour Operator	Victoria	49	**Famous Families**	6	12. Man Caves - Trent defeats Sarah (Ep. 2)	1	N/A	Episode 2
Maureen	Retired Nurse	New South Wales	73	**Disco**	77	13. Disco - Issac defeats Maureen (Ep. 2)	1	N/A	Episode 2
Andrew Prior	French Food Tour Guide	Melbourne, VIC & New South Wales	52	**French Fare**	34	14. The Block - Ben defeats Andrew (Ep. 2)	1	N/A	Episode 2
Natalia	Neurodiversity Manager	Victoria	26	**Salon**	39	15. Symbols - Antonia defeats Natalia (Ep. 2)	1	N/A	Episode 2
Mike	Musician	Northern Territory	52	**Songs About People**	8	16. Catch Phrases - Alina defeats Mike (Ep. 2)	1	N/A	Episode 2
Trent Stathopoulos	Developing Manager	Melbourne, VIC	32	**Man Cave**; Famous Families	15	12. Man Caves - Trent defeats Sarah (Ep. 2); 17. Famous Families - Alina defeats Trent (Ep. 2)	2	N/A	Episode 2
Alina	Public Affairs Officer	ACT	31	**Catch Phrases**; Songs About People	7	16. Catch Phrases - Alina defeats Mike (Ep. 2); 17. Famous Families - Alina defeats Trent (Ep. 2); 18. Brekky - Alex T defeats Alina (Ep. 3)	3	Split Episode 2; 4 spaces ($3,333)	Episode 3
Dana Carmichael	Revenue Strategist	Brisbane, QLD	28	**Slogans**	48	19. Slogans - Harry defeats Dana (Ep. 3)	1	N/A	Episode 3
Josie Montano	Children's Author	Brisbane, QLD	60	**Animal Books**	51	20. Gold Coast - Tommy defeats Josie (Ep. 3)	1	N/A	Episode 3
Tommy Armour	Influencer	Gold Coast, QLD	25	**Gold Coast**; Animal Books	50	20. Gold Coast - Tommy defeats Josie (Ep. 3); 21. Villains - Shane defeats Tommy (Ep. 3)	2	N/A	Episode 3
Shane	Primary School Teacher	Western Australia	39	**Villains**; Animal Books	41	21. Villains - Shane defeats Tommy (Ep. 3); 22. Weddings - Kelsey defeats Shane (Ep. 3)	2	N/A	Episode 3
Ross Dean	Inventor	Shire of Noosa, QLD	56	**Oz Inventions**	58	23. Oz Inventions - Kelsey defeats Ross (Ep. 3)	1	N/A	Episode 3
Ree	Tattoo Shop Manager	New South Wales	29	**Scents**	67	24. Scents - Kelsey defeats Ree (Ep. 3)	1	N/A	Episode 3
Ziggy Gow-Webb	Wildlife Educator	Hobart, TAS	22	**Nocturnal Animals**	5	25. Pets - Wednesday defeats Ziggy (Ep. 3)	1	N/A	Episode 3
Alex T	Chef/Restauranteur	New South Wales	31	**Brekky**; Songs About People	9	18. Brekky - Alex T defeats Alina (Ep. 3); 26. Songs About People - Wednesday defeats Alex T (Ep. 4)	2	N/A	Episode 4
Kevin Moloney	Professional Traveller	New South Wales	67	**The Commonwealth**	20	27. The Commonwealth - Jacki defeats Kevin (Ep. 4)	1	N/A	Episode 4
Jacki Hodge	Travel Influencer	Sydney, NSW	28	**Emojis**	19	27. The Commonwealth - Jacki defeats Kevin (Ep. 4); 28. Aussie Towns - Inia defeats Jacki (Ep. 4)	2	N/A	Episode 4
Jerome Willis	Landscaper and Shearer	Byron Bay, NSW	29	**Rhyming Slang**	81	29. Exercise Moves - Polly defeats Jerome (Ep. 4)	1	N/A	Episode 4
Polly Gale	Pilates Instructor	Dover Heights, NSW	24	**Exercise Moves** (Video Duel); Rhyming Slang	80	29. Exercise Moves - Polly defeats Jerome (Ep. 4); 30. Brides - Elliot defeats Polly (Ep. 4)	2	N/A	Episode 4
Tony Ursich	Finance Manager	Zurich, Switzerland & Western Australia	59	**Currency Codes**	45	31. The Blues - Lauren defeats Tony (Ep. 4)	1	N/A	Episode 4
Ben Troops	Special Education Teacher	New South Wales	40	**The Block**; French Fare	25	1. Iconic Movie Lines - Ben defeats Sinead (Ep. 1); 14. The Block - Ben defeats Andrew (Ep. 2); 32. French Fare - Clea defeats Ben (Ep. 4)	3	N/A	Episode 4
Emma Meggs	Head of Marketing	Melbourne, VIC	42	**Cheese**; Podcasters	33	4. Cheese - Emma defeats Raph (Ep. 1); 33. Podcasters - Clea defeats Emma (Ep. 4)	2	N/A	Episode 4
Harry Barakat	Chemical Engineer	Brisbane, QLD	25	**Video Games**	57	19. Slogans - Harry defeats Dana (Ep. 3); 34. Video Games - Chris defeats Harry (Ep. 5)	2	N/A	Episode 5
Christie Viney	Medical Sales	Melbourne, VIC	45	**Cricket**	47	35. Cricket – Chris defeats Christie (Ep. 5)	1	N/A	Episode 5
Joey Claes	PE Teacher	New South Wales	39	**Athletics**	72	36. Rhyming Slang – Elliot defeats Joey (Ep. 5)	1	N/A	Episode 5
Adam Rida	Political Communications Advisor	Sydney, NSW	34	**Ancient Egypt**	28	37. Emojis – Inia defeats Adam R (Ep. 5)	1	N/A	Episode 5
Nat Keato	Dental Hygienist	New South Wales	31	**Takeaway**	1	38. Takeaway – Inia defeats Nat K (Ep. 5)	1	N/A	Episode 5
Kelsey Clayton	Digital Project Manager	South Australia	29	**Weddings**; Animal Books	49	22. Weddings - Kelsey defeats Shane (Ep. 3); 23. Oz Inventions - Kelsey defeats Ross (Ep. 3); 24. Scents - Kelsey defeats Ree (Ep. 3); 39. Animal Books - Guy defeats Kelsey (Ep. 5)	4	Episode 3; 6 spaces ($10,000)	Episode 5
Lee Sinn	Retired Army Sergeant	South East, QLD	57	**Snacks**	52	40. Snacks – Guy defeats Lee (Ep. 5)	1	N/A	Episode 5
Liz	Thrift Shop Owner	New South Wales	54	**Antiques**	43	41. Antiques – Gerald defeats Liz (Ep. 5)	1	N/A	Episode 5
Issac Kirby	Photographer	Snake Valley, Victoria	32	**Mascots**	76	13. Disco - Issac defeats Maureen (Ep. 2); 42. Mascots - Kate defeats Issac (Ep. 6)	2	N/A	Episode 6
Megan Kinder	Dictionary Editor	Sydney, NSW	53	**Collective Nouns**	12	43. Collective Nouns – Sioux defeats Megan (Ep. 6)	1	N/A	Episode 6
Brad Channer	Tech Company Owner	Western Australia	41	**Antipodean PMs**	38	44. Antipodean PMs – Alex P defeats Brad (Ep. 6)	1	N/A	Episode 6
Nat B	Hospitality Worker	New South Wales	54	**Fictional Fathers**	17	45. Nocturnal Animals – Wednesday defeats Nat B (Ep. 6)	1	N/A	Episode 6
Linda Senn	Agency Administrator	Victoria	59	**G'day** (Audio Duel)	61	46. Athletics – Elliot defeats Linda (Ep. 6)	1	N/A	Episode 6
Jax	Florist	Tamworth, NSW	39	**Sheroes**	69	47. G'day – Elliot defeats Jax (Ep. 6)	1	N/A	Episode 6
Marcus Ross	Licensing Manager	Bunyip, VIC	41	**Half Time Shows**	40	48. Salon - Antonia defeats Marcus (Ep. 6)	1	N/A	Episode 6
Lisa Busher	Airport Lounge Host	Perth, WA	61	**Plane Tails**	16	49. Fictional Fathers – Wednesday defeats Lisa (Ep. 6)	1	N/A	Episode 6
Hayden Quinn	Celebrity Chef	Sydney, NSW	39	**Seafood**	42	50. Car Parts – Gerald defeats Hayden (Ep. 7)	1	N/A	Episode 7
Tasch Turner	Marketing Manager	Claremont, WA	48	**Natural Sounds** (Audio Duel)	35	51. Skibidi – Clea defeats Tasch (Ep. 7)	1	N/A	Episode 7
Clea Sanders	UNESCO Intern	Perth, WA	26	**Skibidi**; Natural Sounds	24	32. French Fare - Clea defeats Ben (Ep. 4); 33. Podcasters - Clea defeats Emma (Ep. 4); 51. Skibidi – Clea defeats Tasch (Ep. 7); 52. Half Time Shows - Antonia defeats Clea (Ep. 7)	4	Split Episode 4; 7 spaces ($5,000)	Episode 7
Pippa Toia-Johnston	Drag Queen	Perth, WA	30	**Kylie**	13	53. Plane Tails – Wednesday defeats Pippa (Ep. 7)	1	N/A	Episode 7
Darcy Moreland	Comedian	Brisbane, QLD	27	**Water Sports**	36	54. Water Sports – Mckenzie defeats Darcy (Ep. 7)	1	N/A	Episode 7
Lauren	Operations Manager	Queensland	57	**The Blues**; Currency Codes	54	31. The Blues - Lauren defeats Tony (Ep. 4); 55. Currency Codes - Mckenzie defeats Lauren (Ep. 7)	2	N/A	Episode 7
Mckenzie Morgan	Doctor	New South Wales	27	**Doctor's Office**	27	54. Water Sports – Mckenzie defeats Darcy (Ep. 7); 55. Currency Codes - Mckenzie defeats Lauren (Ep. 7); 56. Geometry - Jim defeats Mckenzie (Ep. 7)	3	N/A	Episode 7
Sean Ng	Project Manager	South Australia	32	**TV Hosts**	21	57. Natural Sounds – Antonia defeats Sean (Ep. 7)	1	N/A	Episode 7
Jessey-Joe Fa'agase	Customer Service Agent	Brisbane, QLD	31	**Red Carpet** (Video Duel)	74	58. Famous Kates – Kate defeats Jessey-Joe (Ep. 8)	1	N/A	Episode 8
Melanie Thomsen-Wright	Uniform Coordinator	Woodville, NSW	46	**The Crown**	60	59. Sheroes – Elliot defeats Melanie (Ep. 8)	1	N/A	Episode 8
Devika Krishnan	Civil Engineer	Brisbane, QLD	28	**Man Made Marvels**	78	60. Man-Made Marvels – Elliot defeats Devika (Ep. 8)	1	N/A	Episode 8
Elliot	Forklift Operator	Victoria	36	**Road Signs**; Brides; Rhyming Slang; Athletics; G'day (Audio Duel); Sheroes; The Crown	53	11. Road Signs - Elliot defeats JJ (Ep. 2); 30. Brides - Elliot defeats Polly (Ep. 4); 36. Rhyming Slang – Elliot defeats Joey (Ep. 5); 45. Athletics - Elliot defeats Linda (Ep. 6); 46. G'day - Elliot defeats Jax (Ep. 6); 59. Sheroes – Elliot defeats Melanie (Ep. 8); 60. Man-Made Marvels – Elliot defeats Devika (Ep. 8); 61. Doctor's Office - Jim defeats Elliot (Ep. 8)	8	Split Episode 2; 4 spaces Split Episode 6; 9 spaces ($8,333)	Episode 8
Camryn Clare	Burlesque Dancer	Sunshine Coast, QLD	25	**Dance Movies**	10(Episodes 1–5); 11 (Note: Camryn's single tile could only challenge Inia after his territory was frozen. Because of this, Camryn was moved to the nearest open bordering square (square 11) in which she could challenge a player other than Inia. This also caused Inia to claim square 10 as part of his territory and give up square 11 to Camryn.)(Episode 6-10)	62. Outback – Sioux defeats Camryn (Ep. 8)	1	N/A	Episode 8
Kiri Elise	Partnerships Manager	ACT	32	**Australian Made**	68	63. The Crown – Jim defeats Kiri (Ep. 8)	1	N/A	Episode 8
Kristy Lewis	Singing Teacher	Belgrove, VIC	48	**Stage Musicals**	22	64. Tourist Cities – Kim defeats Kristy (Ep. 8)	1	N/A	Episode 8
Jim	Retired Computer Programmer	Queensland	66	**Geometry**; Doctor's Office; The Crown; Australian Made	63	56. Geometry - Jim defeats Mckenzie (Ep. 7); 61. Doctor's Office - Jim defeats Elliot (Ep. 8); 63. The Crown – Jim defeats Kiri (Ep. 8); 65. Australian Made – Adam M defeats Jim (Ep. 8)	4	N/A	Episode 8
Elise Fabris	Singing Teacher	ACT	37	**Baby Animals**; Cinema Classics	37	2. Baby Animals - Elise defeats Ciska (Ep. 1); 66. Cinema Classics – Tyrone defeats Elise (Ep. 9)	2	N/A	Episode 9
Sioux Moresi	School Teacher	Arnhem Land, NT	46	**Outback**; Dance Movies	3	43. Collective Nouns – Sioux defeats Megan (Ep. 6); 62. Outback – Sioux defeats Camryn (Ep. 8); 67. Dance Movies – Noah defeats Camryn (Ep. 9)	3	N/A	Episode 9
Darren Dean	Finance Business Owner	Sydney, NSW	58	**Fish**	79	68. Japanese Food – Adam M defeats Darren (Ep. 9)	1	N/A	Episode 9
Adam Miller	Sushi Restaurant Owner	Melbourne, VIC	25	**Japanese Food**; Fish	18	65. Australian Made – Adam M defeats Jim (Ep. 8); 68. Japanese Food – Adam M defeats Darren (Ep. 9); 69. Fish - Guy defeats Adam M (Ep. 9)	3	Episode 8; 18 spaces ($10,000)	Episode 9
Kim Northwood	Diplomat	Melbourne, VIC	40	**Tourist Cities**; Stage Musicals	23	64. Tourist Cities – Kim defeats Kristy (Ep. 8); 70. Stage Musicals - Wednesday defeats Kim (Ep. 9)	2	N/A	Episode 9
Gerald Youles	Farmer	Kilcoy, QLD	32	**Car Parts**; Seafood	44	41. Antiques – Gerald defeats Liz (Ep. 5); 50. Car Parts – Gerald defeats Hayden (Ep. 7); 71. TV Hosts - Antonia defeats Gerald (Ep. 7)	3	N/A	Episode 9
Antonia Hayes	Author	Sydney, NSW	43	**Symbols**; Salon; Half Time Shows; Natural Sounds; TV Hosts; Seafood	30	15. Symbols - Antonia defeats Natalia (Ep. 2); 47. Salon - Antonia defeats Marcus (Ep. 6); 52. Half Time Shows - Antonia defeats Clea (Ep. 7); 57. Natural Sounds – Antonia defeats Sean (Ep. 7); 71. TV Hosts - Antonia defeats Gerald (Ep. 7); 72. Star Wars - Noah defeats Antonia (Ep. 9)	6	Episode 7; 12 spaces ($20,000)	Episode 9
Noah Groves	Admin Assistant	Tasmania & Leeds, England	30	**Star Wars**; Seafood	4	67. Dance Movies – Noah defeats Camryn (Ep. 9); 72. Star Wars - Noah defeats Antonia (Ep. 9); 73. Seafood - Guy defeats Noah (Ep. 9)	3	N/A	Episode 9
Wednesday Cumming	Pet Shop Owner	South Australia	45	**Pets**; Nocturnal Animals; Fictional Fathers; Plane Tails; Kylie	14	25. Pets - Wednesday defeats Ziggy (Ep. 3); 26. Songs About People - Wednesday defeats Alex T (Ep. 4); 45. Nocturnal Animals - Wednesday defeats Nat B (Ep. 6); 49. Fictional Fathers - Wednesday defeats Lisa (Ep. 6); 53. Plane Tails – Wednesday defeats Pippa (Ep. 7); 70. Stage Musicals - Wednesday defeats Kim (Ep. 9); 74. Moguls - Guy defeats Wednesday (Ep. 10)	7	Split Episode 4; 7 spaces Split Episode 6; 9 spaces ($10,000)	Episode 10
Chris Strog	Support Teacher	Adelaide, SA	23	**EPL**	66	34. Video Games - Chris defeats Harry (Ep. 5); 35. Cricket – Chris defeats Christie (Ep. 5); 75. Australian Open - Tyrone defeats Chris (Ep. 10)	3	N/A	Episode 10
Tyrone James	Ticketing Manager	Melbourne, VIC	44	**Australian Open**; EPL	55	66. Cinema Classics – Tyrone defeats Elise (Ep. 9); 75. Australian Open - Tyrone defeats Chris (Ep. 10); 76. Kylie - Guy defeats Tyrone (Ep. 10)	3	N/A	Episode 10
Guy Turner	Global Media Strategist	Claremont, WA	45	**Moguls**; Kylie; EPL	59	39. Animal Books – Guy defeats Kelsey (Ep. 5); 40. Snacks - Guy defeats Lee (Ep. 5); 69. Fish - Guy defeats Adam M (Ep. 9); 73. Seafood - Guy defeats Noah (Ep. 9); 74. Moguls - Guy defeats Wednesday (Ep. 10); 76. Kylie - Guy defeats Tyrone (Ep. 10); 77. Ancient Egypt - Inia defeats Guy (Ep. 10)	7	Episode 5; 8 spaces Episode 9; 46 spaces ($20,000)	Episode 10
Inia James	Ex-Stunt Man	New South Wales	47	**Action Flicks**; Aussie Towns; Emojis; Ancient Egypt; EPL	2	6. Action Flicks - Inia defeats Scott (Ep. 1); 28. Aussie Towns - Inia defeats Jacki (Ep. 4); 37. Emojis - Inia defeats Adam R (Ep. 5); 38. Takeaway - Inia defeats Nat K (Ep. 5); 77. Ancient Egypt - Inia defeats Guy (Ep. 10); 78. EPL - Alex P defeats Inia (Ep. 10)	6	Episode 5 Frozen (4 duel wins); Episode 9 Unfrozen (After Duel 68)	Episode 10
Jess Maio	Drummer	Melbourne, VIC	27	**Oz Rock**	56	7. Rom Coms - Jess defeats Stav (Ep. 1); 8. Gemstones - Jess defeats Peta-Pearl (Ep. 1); 79. Sounds of Music - Alex P defeats Jess (Ep. 10)	3	Episode 1 Split Episode 2; 4 spaces ($23,333)	Episode 10
Kate Lynam	Flight Attendant	Sydney, NSW	34	**Famous Kates**; Red Carpet (Video Duel)	75	42. Mascots - Kate defeats Issac (Ep. 5); 58. Famous Kates – Kate defeats Jessey-Joe (Ep. 8); 80. Red Carpet - Alex P defeats Kate (Ep. 10); 81. Oz Rock - Alex P defeats Kate (Ep. 10)	4	N/A	Episode 10
Alex Palmer	Composer	Sydney, NSW	33	**Sounds of Music** (Audio Duel); Oz Rock	29	44. Antipodean PMs – Alex P defeats Brad (Ep. 6); 78. EPL - Alex P defeats Inia (Ep. 10); 79. Sounds of Music - Alex P defeats Jess (Ep. 10); 80. Red Carpet - Alex P defeats Kate (Ep. 10); 81. Oz Rock - Alex P defeats Kate (Ep. 10)	5	**Season Winner** **($200,000)**	

== Duels ==
Color key
Contestant won the duel
Contestant lost the duel and was eliminated (Eliminations are not possible in the first two parts of the final three-part duel)
Contestant was the runner-up
Contestant won the season
Contestant won the duel and a time boost
Contestant used the time boost and won
Contestant used the time boost and was eliminated

=== Season 1 ===
Week 1 Part 1: (28 April 2025): Top 81 – 9 Duels

First episode results
Duel No.	Challenger	Category	Challenged	Winner's Time	Spaces Won (Total)	Choice
1	Janaye	Kids' Movies	Beth	1 second left	1 space (2 total)	Floor
2	Issac	Reality TV	Desiree	33 seconds left	1 space (2 total)	Floor
3	Natasha	Shoes	Angus	10 seconds left	1 space (2 total)	Floor
4	Jennifer	Fruits	Shawna	21 seconds left	1 space (2 total)	Continued
5	Shawna	Bands	Georgia	38 seconds left	2 spaces (3 total)	Continued
6	Georgia	Dogs	Melanie	10 seconds left	3 spaces (4 total)	Continued
7	Melanie	Celebrations	Sheena	10 seconds left	4 spaces (5 total)	Floor
8	Jesse	Aussie Tucker	Andrew	7 seconds left	1 space (2 total)	Floor
9	Nicho	Capital Cities (Inherited)	Sheena	33 seconds left	1 space (6 total)	Continued

Week 1 Part 2: (29 April 2025): Top 72 - 9 Duels

Second episode results
Duel No.	Challenger	Category	Challenged	Winner's Time	Spaces Won (Total)	Choice
10	Sheena	Babies	Jules	3 seconds left	1 space (7 total)	Continued
11	Sheena	Famous Characters	Sophie	33 seconds left	7 spaces (8 total)	Continued
12	Sophie	Top TV Series (Inherited)	Angus	20 seconds left	2 spaces (10 total)	Continued
13	Sophie	Brands	Gill	4 seconds left	1 space (11 total)	Floor
14	Aaron	Logie Winners	Issac	25 seconds left	1 space (3 total)	Continued
15	Issac	Aussie Pollies	Dylan	19 seconds left	1 space (4 total)	Continued
16	Issac	Countries	Ryan	7 seconds left	4 spaces (5 total)	Continued
17	Ryan	Aussie Sport Heroes	Darren	13 seconds left	5 spaces (6 total)	Floor
18	Shez	Ball Games	Cory	5 seconds left	1 space (2 total)	Floor

Week 2 Part 1: (5 May 2025): Top 63 - 9 Duels

Third episode results
Duel No.	Challenger	Category	Challenged	Winner's Time	Spaces Won (Total)	Choice
19	Flynn	Birds	Christina	17 seconds left	1 space (2 total)	Continued
20	Flynn	Car Logos (Inherited)	Darren	7 seconds left	6 spaces (8 total)	Continued
21	Flynn	Anatomy	Georgie	9 seconds left	8 spaces (9 total)	Continued
22	Georgie	Aussie Landmarks	Shonagh	8 seconds left	1 space (10 total)	Continued
23	Georgie	Text Talk	Esther	27 seconds left	10 spaces (11 total)	Floor
24	Raechel	Cartoon Characters (Inherited)	Andrew	27 seconds left	2 spaces (3 total)	Floor
25	Callum	Water Creatures	Kristy	14 seconds left	1 space (2 total)	Floor
26	Jack	Child's Play (Kids' Activities, Inherited)	Esther	10 seconds left	1 space (12 total)	Floor
27	Tash	Bathroom	Bok Choi	11 seconds left	1 space (2 total)	Floor

Week 2 Part 2: (6 May 2025): Top 54 - 9 Duels

Fourth episode results
Duel No.	Challenger	Category	Challenged	Winner's Time	Spaces Won (Total)	Choice
28	Kieren	Tools	Zane	4 seconds left	1 space (2 total)	Continued
29	Kieren	BBQ	Amina	20 seconds left	2 spaces (3 total)	Floor
30	Carly	Comedians	Luke	23 seconds left	1 space (2 total)	Continued
31	Luke	Drinks	David	9 seconds left	2 spaces (3 total)	Continued
32	David	Flags (Inherited)	Sophie	1 second left	11 spaces (14 total)	Continued
33	David	Tennis Legends	Steven	22 seconds left	14 spaces (15 total)	Floor
34	Ella	Scary Movies	Mikey	1 second left	1 spaces (2 total)	Floor
35	Paul	Quotes	Emily	13 seconds left	1 space (2 total)	Floor
36	Suzanne	Creepy Crawlies	Cornell	29 seconds left	1 space (2 total)	Floor

Week 3 Part 1: (12 May 2025): Top 45 - 9 Duels

Fifth episode results
Duel No.	Challenger	Category	Challenged	Winner's Time	Spaces Won (Total)	Choice
37	Laura	Slogans (Inherited)	Esther	6 seconds left	1 space (13 total)	Floor
38	Kale	Plants	Daniel	18 seconds left	1 space (2 total)	Floor
39	Rebecca	Kitchen Drawer	Amy	12 seconds left	1 space (2 total)	Continued
40	Amy	Historical Events	Rory	38 seconds left	2 spaces (3 total)	Floor
41	Charlie	Kids' Books (Inherited)	Esther	29 seconds left	1 space (14 total)	Continued
42	Esther	Home Decor (Inherited)	Cornell	17 seconds left	14 spaces (16 total)	Continued
43	Cornell	Appliances	Ruth	16 seconds left	16 spaces (17 total)	Floor
44	Duncan	Aussie Films (Inherited)	Kristy	22 seconds left	2 spaces (3 total)	Floor
45	Chris	Hit Songs (Inherited)	Steven	17 seconds left	15 spaces (16 total)	Floor

Week 3 Part 2: (13 May 2025): Top 36 - 9 Duels

Sixth episode results
Duel No.	Challenger	Category	Challenged	Winner's Time	Spaces Won (Total)	Choice
46	Dougie	World Landmarks	Renusha	18 seconds left	1 space (2 total)	Floor
47	Kate	Primary Maths	Chris	2 seconds left	16 spaces (17 total)	Floor
48	Patrick	Bathroom (Inherited)	Bok Choi	8 seconds left	2 spaces (3 total)	Floor
49	Myles	Confectionery	Raechel	10 seconds left	1 space (4 total)	Floor
50	Rick	Professions	Dougie	9 seconds left	1 space (3 total)	Continued
51	Dougie	Aussie Slang	Clancy	20 seconds left	1 space (4 total)	Continued
52	Dougie	Sports Gear	Jono	20 seconds left	4 spaces (5 total)	Floor
53	Angus	Songs About Places	Paul	18 seconds left	1 space (3 total)	Floor
54	Nicole	80's Blockbusters (Inherited)	Ruth	22 seconds left	1 space (18 total)	Floor

Week 4 Part 1: (19 May 2025): Top 27 - 9 Duels

Seventh episode results
Duel No.	Challenger	Category	Challenged	Winner's Time	Spaces Won (Total)	Choice
55	Lara	Pasta	Kate	14 seconds left	1 space (18 total)	Floor
56	Angela	Clothing	Shez	5 seconds left	2 spaces (3 total)	Floor
57	Don	Instruments	Patrick	19 seconds left	1 space (4 total)	Floor
58	Andy	Celebrity Couples (Inherited)	Kate	38 seconds left	1 space (19 total)	Floor
59	Jan	Boy Bands (Inherited)	Kate	35 seconds left	1 space (20 total)	Floor
60	Monica	Transport (Inherited)	Raechel	2 seconds left	4 spaces (5 total)	Floor
61	Dusty	Desserts	Janaye	27 seconds left	1 space (3 total)	Continued
62	Janaye	Fashion Icons	Angela	11 seconds left	3 spaces (6 total)	Floor
63	Ruth	Herbs & Spices (Inherited)	Ashley	16 seconds left	18 spaces (19 total)	Floor

Week 4 Part 2: (20 May 2025): Top 18 - 9 Duels

Eighth episode results
Duel No.	Challenger	Category	Challenged	Winner's Time	Spaces Won (Total)	Choice
64	Kireth	Mobile Apps	Cora	3 seconds left	1 space (2 total)	Floor
65	Ally	Bestsellers	Monica	23 seconds left	1 space (6 total)	Floor
66	Benny	Farming (Inherited)	Janaye	17 seconds left	6 spaces (7 total)	Continued
67	Benny	Soccer Stars (Inherited)	Kate	13 seconds left	7 spaces (27 total)	Floor
68	Michelle	Aussie Wildlife (Inherited)	Kate	10 seconds left	1 space (28 total)	Floor
69 (Note: Stuart was the last contestant remaining with a one-square territory. Therefore, he was selected by default to play. From this point on, all the remaining players became eligible for the randomizer at any time.)	Stuart	World Food (Inherited)	Kate	30 seconds left	1 space (29 total)	Floor
70	Paul	Famous Duos (Inherited)	Jono	31 seconds left	3 spaces (8 total)	Continued
71	Jono	Gold Medalists (Inherited)	Kate	24 seconds left	8 spaces (37 total)	Floor
72	Rory	Toddler Tales (Inherited)	Monica	30 seconds left	3 spaces (9 total)	Floor

Week 5: (26 May 2025): Top 9 - 10 Duels

Ninth episode results
Duel No.	Challenger	Category	Challenged	Winner's Time	Spaces Won (Total)	Choice	Final Duel Score
73	Kale	Periodic Table (Inherited)	Kate	13 seconds left	2 spaces (39 total)	Floor	N/A
74	Ella	Musical Movies (Inherited)	Monica	29 seconds left	2 spaces (11 total)	Floor	N/A
75	Ashley	Toys (Inherited)	Kate	32 seconds left	19 spaces (58 total)	Floor	N/A
76	Patrick	Girl Groups (Inherited)	Kate	37 seconds left	58 spaces (62 total)	Floor	N/A
77	Kireth	Beauty (Inherited)	Monica	5 seconds left	2 spaces (13 total)	Floor	N/A
78	Duncan	Sci-Fi - Characters (Inherited)	Monica	2 seconds left	3 spaces (16 total)	Floor	N/A
79	Patrick	Games Night (Inherited)	Monica	4 seconds left	16 spaces (78 total)	Duel Choice: History Makers, then Veggies	N/A
80	Patrick	History Makers (Inherited)	Amina	25 seconds left	N/A	N/A	1-0
81	Amina	Veggies (Inherited)	Patrick	15 seconds left	N/A	Duel Choice: World Leaders (Note: The three choices were World Leaders, Hollywood Legends & Beach.)	1-1
82	Patrick (Note: Patrick chose the final duel category, so he went first.)	World Leaders (Tiebreaker)	Amina	32 seconds left	3 spaces (81 total)	N/A	2-1

=== Season 2 ===
Week 1 Part 1 (April 19, 2026): Top 81 – 8 Duels

First episode results
Duel No.	Challenger	Category	Challenged	Winner's Time	Spaces Won (Total)	Choice
1	Ben	Iconic Movie Lines	Sinead	19 seconds left	1 space (2 total)	Floor
2	Ciska	Baby Animals	Elise	28 seconds left	1 space (2 total)	Floor
3	Cathal	Roman Numerals	Raph	13 seconds left	1 space (2 total)	Continued
4	Raph	Cheese	Emma	28 seconds left	2 spaces (3 total)	Floor
5	Peta-Pearl	Bakery	Ella	19 seconds left	1 space (2 total)	Floor
6	Scott	Action Flicks	Inia	31 seconds left	1 space (2 total)	Floor
7	Jess	Romcoms	Stav	6 seconds left	1 space (2 total)	Continued
8	Jess	Gemstones	Peta-Pearl	1 second left	2 spaces (4 total)	Floor

Week 1 Part 2 (April 20, 2026): Top 73 – 9 Duels

Second episode results
Duel No.	Challenger	Category	Challenged	Winner's Time	Spaces Won (Total)	Choice
9	Grace	Winter Sports	Steven	25 seconds left	1 space (2 total)	Continued
10	Steven	World Champs	JJ	3 seconds left	2 spaces (3 total)	Continued
11	JJ	Road Signs	Elliot	23 seconds left	3 spaces (4 total)	Floor
12	Sarah	Man Cave	Trent	29 seconds left	1 space (2 total)	Floor
13	Issac	Disco	Maureen	16 seconds left	1 space (2 total)	Floor
14	Andrew	The Block	Ben	10 seconds left	1 space (3 total)	Floor
15	Natalia	Symbols	Antonia	11 seconds left	1 space (2 total)	Floor
16	Mike	Catch Phrases	Alina	28 seconds left	1 space (2 total)	Continued
17	Alina	Famous Families (Inherited)	Trent	8 seconds left	2 spaces (4 total)	Continued

Week 2 Part 1 (April 26, 2026): Top 64 – 8 Duels

Third episode results
Duel No.	Challenger	Category	Challenged	Winner's Time	Spaces Won (Total)	Choice
18	Alina	Brekky	Alex T	9 seconds left	4 spaces (5 total)	Floor
19	Harry	Slogans	Dana	15 seconds left	1 space (2 total)	Floor
20	Josie	Gold Coast	Tommy	16 seconds left	1 space (2 total)	Continued
21	Tommy	Villains	Shane	42 seconds left	2 spaces (3 total)	Continued
22	Shane	Weddings	Kelsey	15 seconds left	3 spaces (4 total)	Continued
23	Kelsey	Oz Inventions	Ross	22 seconds left	1 space (5 total)	Continued
24	Kelsey	Scents	Ree	10 seconds left	1 space (6 total)	Floor
25	Ziggy	Pets	Wednesday	13 seconds left	1 space (2 total)	Continued

Week 2 Part 2 (April 27, 2026): Top 56 – 8 Duels

Fourth episode results
Duel No.	Challenger	Category	Challenged	Winner's Time	Spaces Won (Total)	Choice
26	Wednesday	Songs About People (Inherited)	Alex T	5 seconds left	5 spaces (7 total)	Floor
27	Jacki	The Commonwealth	Kevin	18 seconds left	1 space (2 total)	Continued
28	Jacki	Aussie Towns (Inherited)	Inia	17 seconds left	2 spaces (4 total)	Floor
29	Jerome	Exercise Moves (Video Duel)	Polly	32 seconds left	1 space (2 total)	Continued
30	Polly	Brides (Inherited)	Elliot	16 seconds left	2 spaces (6 total)	Floor
31	Tony	The Blues	Lauren	24 seconds left	1 space (2 total)	Floor
32	Clea	French Fare (Inherited)	Ben	29 seconds left	3 spaces (4 total)	Continued
33	Clea	Podcasters (Inherited)	Emma	36 seconds left	3 spaces (7 total)	Floor

Week 3 Part 1 (May 3, 2026): Top 48 – 8 Duels

Fifth episode results
Duel No.	Challenger	Category	Challenged	Winner's Time	Spaces Won (Total)	Choice
34	Chris	Video Games	Harry	15 seconds left	2 spaces (3 total)	Continued
35	Chris	Cricket	Christie	13 seconds left	1 space (4 total)	Floor
36	Joey	Rhyming Slang (Inherited)	Elliot	7 seconds left	1 space (7 total)	Floor
37	Adam R	Emojis (Inherited)	Inia	10 seconds left	1 space (5 total)	Continued
38	Inia	Takeaway	Nat K	13 seconds left	1 space (6 total)	Floor
39	Guy	Animal Books (Inherited)	Kelsey (Note: Kelsey chose to save the time boost for a later duel.)	17 seconds left	6 spaces (7 total)	Continued
40	Guy	Snacks	Lee	33 seconds left	1 space (8 total)	Floor
41	Gerald	Antiques	Liz	4 seconds left	1 space (2 total)	Floor

Week 3 Part 2 (May 4, 2026): Top 40 – 8 Duels

Sixth episode results
Duel No.	Challenger	Category	Challenged	Winner's Time	Spaces Won (Total)	Choice
42	Kate	Mascots	Issac	21 seconds left	2 spaces (3 total)	Floor
43	Sioux	Collections (Collective Nouns)	Megan	14 seconds left	1 space (2 total)	Floor
44	Alex P	Antipodean PM's	Brad	18 seconds left	1 space (2 total)	Floor
45	Nat B	Nocturnal Animals (Inherited)	Wednesday	19 seconds left	1 space (8 total)	Floor
46	Linda	Athletics (Inherited)	Elliot	22 seconds left	1 space (8 total)	Floor
47	Jax	G'day (Inherited, Audio Duel)	Elliot	28 seconds left	1 space (9 total)	Floor
48	Marcus	Salon (Inherited)	Antonia	18 seconds left	1 space (3 total)	Floor
49	Lisa	Fictional Fathers (Inherited)	Wednesday	18 seconds left	1 space (9 total)	Floor

Week 4 Part 1 (May 10, 2026): Top 32 – 8 Duels

Because every player decided to return to the floor, Rodger increased the weekly prize to $20,000.

Seventh episode results
Duel No.	Challenger	Category	Challenged	Winner's Time	Spaces Won (Total)	Choice
50	Hayden	Car Parts	Gerald	1 second left	1 space (3 total)	Floor
51	Tasch	Skibidi	Clea	36 seconds left	1 space (8 total)	Continued
52	Clea	Halftime Shows (Inherited)	Antonia	1 second left	8 spaces (11 total)	Floor
53	Pippa	Plane Tails (Inherited)	Wednesday	19 seconds left	1 space (10 total)	Floor
54	Mckenzie	Water Sports	Darcy	14 seconds left	1 space (2 total)	Continued
55	Mckenzie	Currency Codes (Inherited)	Lauren	6 seconds left	2 spaces (4 total)	Continued
56	Mckenzie	Geometry	Jim	22 seconds left	4 spaces (5 total)	Floor
57	Sean	Nature Sounds (Audio Duel, Inherited)	Antonia	36 seconds left	1 space (12 total)	Floor

Week 4 Part 2 (May 11, 2026): Top 24 – 8 Duels

Eighth episode results
Duel No.	Challenger	Category	Challenged	Winner's Time	Spaces Won (Total)	Choice
58	Jessey-Joe	Famous Kates	Kate	37 seconds left	1 space (4 total)	Floor
59	Melanie	Sheroes	Elliot	20 seconds left	1 space (10 total)	Continued
60	Elliot	Man-Made Marvels	Devika	9 seconds left	1 space (11 total)	Continued
61	Elliot	Doctor's Office	Jim	15 seconds left	11 spaces (16 total)	Floor
62	Camryn	Outback	Sioux	32 seconds left	1 space (3 total)	Floor
63	Kiri	The Crown (Inherited)	Jim	25 seconds left	1 space (17 total)	Floor
64	Kristy	Tourist Cities	Kim	1 second left	1 space (2 total)	Floor
65	Adam M	Australian Made (Inherited)	Jim	36 seconds left	17 spaces (18 total)	Floor

Week 5 Part 1 (May 17, 2026): Top 16 – 8 Duels

Ninth episode results
Duel No.	Challenger	Category	Challenged	Winner's Time	Spaces Won (Total)	Choice
66	Tyrone	Cinema Classics (Inherited)	Elise	22 seconds left	2 spaces (3 total)	Floor
67	Noah	Dance Movies (Inherited)	Sioux	32 seconds left	3 spaces (4 total)	Floor
68 (Note: Darren was the last contestant remaining with a one-square territory. Therefore, he was selected by default to play. From this point on, all the remaining players became eligible for the randomizer at any time, including Inia, who was unfrozen.)	Darren	Japanese Food	Adam M	29 seconds left	1 space (19 total)	Floor
69	Guy	Fish (Inherited)	Adam M	5 seconds left	19 spaces (27 total)	Floor
70	Wednesday	Stage Musicals (Inherited)	Kim	29 seconds left	2 spaces (12 total)	Floor
71	Gerald	TV Hosts (Inherited)	Antonia	44 seconds left	3 spaces (15 total)	Continued
72	Antonia	Star Wars	Noah	16 seconds left	15 spaces (19 total)	Floor
73	Guy	Seafood (Inherited)	Noah	26 seconds left	19 spaces (46 total)	Floor

Week 5 Part 2 (May 18, 2026): Top 8 – 8 Duels

Tenth episode results
Duel No.	Challenger	Category	Challenged	Winner's Time	Spaces Won (Total)	Choice	Final Duel Choice
74	Wednesday	Moguls	Guy	1 second left	12 spaces (58 total)	Floor	N/A
75	Chris	Australian Open	Tyrone	5 seconds left	4 spaces (7 total)	Continued	N/A
76	Tyrone	Kylie (Inherited)	Guy	10 seconds left	7 spaces (65 total)	Continued	N/A
77	Guy	Ancient Egypt (Inherited)	Inia	6 seconds left	65 spaces (71 total)	Floor	N/A
78	Alex P	EPL (Inherited)	Inia	31 seconds left	71 spaces (73 total)	Floor	N/A
79	Jess	Sounds of Music (Audio Duel)	Alex P	13 seconds left	4 spaces (77 total)	Duel Choice: Red Carpet, then Oz Rock	N/A
80	Alex P	Red Carpet (Video Duel, Inherited)	Kate	11 seconds left	N/A	N/A	1-0
81	Kate	Oz Rock (Inherited)	Alex P	23 seconds left	4 spaces (81 total)	N/A	2-0

== Episodes ==
=== Series Overview ===
Series	Contestants	Episodes	Originally released		Winner	Runner-up
Series	Contestants	Episodes	First released	Last released	Winner	Runner-up
1	81	9	28 April 2025	26 May 2025	Patrick Neasey	Amina Elshafei
2	81	10	19 April 2026	18 May 2026	Alex Palmer	Kate Lynam

=== Season 1 (2025) ===
Winners of individual duels are shown in boldface shown as Challenger (randomized or choosing to play on)/Defender (chosen by challenger). Time boosts earned in Italics. Time boosts used shown in Underline.

No. overall	No. in season	Title	Original release date	Prod. code	Aus. Viewers (Total)
1	1	"Welcome to the Floor"	28 April 2025	FLR-101	1,171,000
81 contestants begin their journey to $200,000.: Duels played (9): **Janaye** vs. Beth (Kids' Movies), **Issac** vs. Desiree (Reality TV), Natasha vs. **Angus** (Shoes), Jennifer vs. **Shawna** (Fruits), Shawna vs. **Georgia** (Bands), Georgia vs. **Melanie** (Dogs), Melanie vs **Sheena** (Celebrations), Jesse vs. **Andrew** (Aussie Tucker), Nicho vs. **Sheena** (Capital Cities); Episode winner: Sheena (6 spaces)
2	2	"The Time Boost"	29 April 2025	FLR-102	1,144,000
A new weapon comes into play.: Duels played (9): **Sheena** vs. Jules (Babies), Sheena vs. **Sophie** (Famous Characters), **Sophie** vs. Angus (Top TV Series), **Sophie** vs. Gill (Brands), Aaron vs. **Issac** (Logie Winners), **Issac** vs. Dylan (Aussie Pollies), Issac vs. **Ryan** (Countries), Ryan vs. **Darren** (Aussie Sport Heroes), **Shez** vs. Cory (Ball Games); Episode winner: Sophie (11 spaces)
3	3	"Rise of the Whales"	5 May 2024	FLR-103	1,103,000
Territories expand in a night of Birds, Anatomy and Technology.: Duels played (9): **Flynn** vs. Christina (Birds), **Flynn** vs. Darren (Car Logos), Flynn vs. **Georgie** (Anatomy), **Georgie** vs. Shonagh (Aussie Landmarks), Georgie vs. **Esther** (Text Talk), **Raechel** vs. Andrew (Cartoon Characters), Callum vs. **Kristy** (Water Creatures), Jack vs. **Esther** (Child's Play), Tash vs. **Bok Choi** (Technology); Episode winner: Esther (12 spaces)
4	4	"Friendship"	6 May 2025	FLR-104	1,059,000
Bonds are tested as the race for the nightly prize intensifies.: Duels played (9): **Kieren** vs. Zane (Tools), Kieren vs. **Amina** (BBQ), Carly vs. **Luke** (Comedians), Luke vs. **David** (Drinks), **David** vs. Sophie (Flags), David vs. **Steven** (Tennis Legends), **Ella** vs. Mikey (Scary Movies), **Paul** vs. Emily (Quotes), Suzanne vs. **Cornell** (Creepy Crawlies); Episode winner: Steven (15 spaces)
5	5	"Strategy"	12 May 2025	FLR-105	1,060,000
Strategy takes over as the game passes the halfway point.: Duels played (9): Laura vs. **Esther** (Slogans), **Kale** vs. Daniel (Plants), Rebecca vs. **Amy** (Kitchen Drawer), Amy vs. **Rory** (Historical Events), Charlie vs. **Esther** (Kids' Books), Esther vs. **Cornell** (Home Decor), Cornell vs. **Ruth** (Appliances), **Duncan** vs. Kristy (Aussie Films), **Chris** vs. Steven (Hit Songs); Episode winner: Ruth (17 spaces)
6	6	"Playing It Safe"	13 May 2025	FLR-106	1,073,000
Players do whatever it takes to stay in the game.: Duels played (9): **Dougie** vs. Renusha (World Landmarks), **Kate** vs. Chris (Primary Maths), **Patrick** vs. Bok Choi (Bathroom), Myles vs. **Raechel** (Confectionery), Rick vs. **Dougie** (Professions), **Dougie** vs. Clancy (Aussie Slang), Dougie vs. **Jono** (Sports Gear), Angus vs. **Paul** (Songs About Places), Nicole vs. **Ruth** (80's Blockbusters); Episode winner: Ruth (18 spaces)
7	7	"Survival"	19 May 2025	FLR-107	1,116,000
Everyone fights for survival as the end of the game nears.: Duels played (9): Lara vs. **Kate** (Pasta), **Angela** vs. Shez (Clothing), Don vs. **Patrick** (Instruments), Andy vs. **Kate** (Celebrity Couples), Jan vs. **Kate** (Boy Bands), **Monica** vs. Raechel (Transport), Dusty vs. **Janaye** (Desserts), **Janaye** vs. Angela (Fashion Icons), **Ashley** vs. Ruth (Herbs & Spices); Episode winner: Kate (20 spaces)
8	8	"Semi-Final"	20 May 2025	FLR-108	1,147,000
Everyone is on edge as the final 9 players are determined.: Duels played (9): **Kireth** vs. Cora (Mobile Apps), Ally vs. **Monica** (Bestsellers), **Benny** vs. Janaye (Farming), Benny vs. **Kate** (Soccer Stars), Michelle vs. **Kate** (Aussie Wildlife), Stuart vs. **Kate** (World Food), Paul vs. **Jono** (Famous Duos), Jono vs. **Kate** (Gold Medalists), Rory vs. **Monica** (Toddler Tales); Episode winner: Kate (37 spaces)
9	9	"Grand Final"	26 May 2025	FLR-109	1,207,000
Who will win the Floor?: Duels played (10): Kale vs. **Kate** (Periodic Table), Ella vs. **Monica** (Musical Movies), Ashley vs. **Kate** (Toys), **Patrick** vs. Kate (Girl Groups), Kireth vs. **Monica** (Beauty), Duncan vs. **Monica** (Sci-Fi - Characters), **Patrick** vs. Monica (Games Night), **Patrick** vs. Amina (History Makers: Patrick, Veggies: Amina, World Leaders: Patrick; final result: 2-1); Season winner: Patrick

=== Season 2 (2026) ===
Winners of individual duels are shown in boldface shown as Challenger (randomized or choosing to play on)/Defender (chosen by challenger). Time boosts earned in Italics. Time boosts used shown in Underline.

No. overall	No. in season	Title	Original release date	Prod. code	Aus. Viewers (Total)
10	1	"Episode 1"	19 April 2026	FLR-201	979,000
81 Aussies, each with their own area of expert knowledge begin to duel it out to conquer the floor and win the $200,000 grand prize. **Note: For this episode, the weekly prize was $20,000.**: Duels played (8): **Ben** vs Sinead (Iconic Movie Lines), Ciska vs **Elise** (Baby Animals), Cathal vs **Raph** (Roman Numerals), Raph vs **Emma** (Cheese), **Peta-Pearl** vs Ella (Bakery), Scott vs **Inia** (Action Flicks), **Jess** vs Stav (Rom Coms), **Jess** vs Peta-Pearl (Gemstones); Episode winner: Jess (4 spaces)
11	2	"Episode 2"	20 April 2026	FLR-202	975,000
73 players remain to battle for control of the floor and in a Floor first, three relentless competitors refuse to back away from the $10,000 nightly bonus prize.: Duels played (9): Grace vs **Steven** (Winter Sports), Steven vs **JJ** (World Champs), JJ vs **Elliot** (Road Signs), Sarah vs **Trent** (Man Cave), **Issac** vs Maureen (Disco), Andrew vs **Ben** (The Block), Natalia vs **Antonia** (Symbols), Mike vs **Alina** (Catch Phrases), **Alina** vs Trent (Famous Families); Episode winners: Jess, Alina, & Elliot (4 spaces each)
12	3	"Episode 3"	26 April 2026	FLR-203	906,000
65 contestants are on the floor ready to do or die to move another spot closer to 200k. Tonight a player becomes the first to win a major advantage, but who will it be?: Duels played (8): Alina vs **Alex T** (Brekky), **Harry** vs Dana (Slogans), Josie vs **Tommy** (Gold Coast), Tommy vs **Shane** (Villains), Shane vs **Kelsey** (Weddings), **Kelsey** vs Ross (Oz Inventions), **Kelsey** vs Ree (Scents), Ziggy vs **Wednesday** (Pets); Episode winner: Kelsey (6 spaces)
13	4	"Episode 4"	27 April 2026	FLR-204	901,000
Our 56 remaining players duke it out for the $10,000 nightly bonus prize. Tonight it's the battle of the Travel Guides. Who will come out on top?: Duels played (8): **Wednesday** vs Alex T (Songs About People), **Jacki** vs Kevin (The Commonwealth), Jacki vs **Inia** (Aussie Towns), Jerome vs **Polly** (Exercise Moves), Polly vs **Elliot** (Brides), Tony vs **Lauren** (The Blues), **Clea** vs Ben (French Fare), **Clea** vs Emma (Podcasters); Episode winners: Wednesday & Clea (7 spaces each)
14	5	"Episode 5"	3 May 2026	FLR-205	825,000
Nearly half the original 81 players have been eliminated. Tonight, The Floor awards its biggest player advantage ever. As the game heats up, who will win a cool run to the finals with The Freeze?: Duels played (8): **Chris** vs Harry (Video Games), **Chris** vs Christie (Cricket), Joey vs **Elliot** (Rhyming Slang), Adam R vs **Inia** (Emojis), **Inia** vs Nat K (Takeaway), **Guy** vs Kelsey (Animal Books), **Guy** vs Lee (Snacks), **Gerald** vs Liz (Antiques); Episode winner: Guy (8 spaces); Freeze winner: Inia (6 spaces, 4 duel wins)
15	6	"Episode 6"	4 May 2026	FLR-206	910,000
40 players are still vying for the $200,000 grand prize. A returning dueller cements his place on the floor.: Duels played (8): **Kate** vs Issac (Mascots), **Sioux** vs Megan (Collective Nouns), **Alex P** vs Brad (Antipodean PMs), Nat B vs **Wednesday** (Nocturnal Animals), Linda vs **Elliot** (Athletics), Jax vs **Elliot** (G'day), Marcus vs **Antonia** (Salon), Lisa vs **Wednesday** (Fictional Fathers); Episode winners: Elliot & Wednesday (9 spaces each)
16	7	"Episode 7"	10 May 2026	FLR-207	965,000
With just 32 players left on the floor, it's time to turn it up a notch. The nightly bonus prize is doubled to $20,000 for one night only.: Duels played (8): Hayden vs **Gerald** (Car Parts), Tasch vs **Clea** (Skibidi), Clea vs **Antonia** (Half Time Shows), Pippa vs **Wednesday** (Plane Tails), **Mckenzie** vs Darcy (Water Sports), **Mckenzie** vs Lauren (Currency Codes), Mckenzie vs **Jim** (Geometry), Sean vs **Antonia** (Natural Sounds); Episode winner: Antonia (12 spaces)
17	8	"Episode 8"	11 May 2026	FLR-208	947,000
With 24 players remaining on the Floor, and as the Grand Finale approaches, one of our biggest players decides it's time to change up the strategy.: Duels played (8): Jessey-Joe vs **Kate** (Famous Kates), Melanie vs **Elliot** (Sheroes), **Elliot** vs Devika (Man-Made Marvels), Elliot vs **Jim** (Doctor's Office), Camryn vs **Sioux** (Outback), Kiri vs **Jim** (The Crown), Kristy vs **Kim** (Tourist Cities), **Adam M** vs Jim (Australian Made); Episode winner: Adam M (18 spaces)
18	9	"Episode 9"	17 May 2026	FLR-209	853,000
From 81 we are down to 16 players. It's the Semi-Final and by the end of tonight half will be gone, leaving 8 players one night away from $200,000.: Duels played (8): **Tyrone** vs Elise (Cinema Classics), **Noah** vs Sioux (Dance Movies), Darren vs **Adam M** (Japanese Food), **Guy** vs Adam M (Fish), **Wednesday** vs Kim (Stage Musicals), Gerald vs **Antonia** (TV Hosts), Antonia vs **Noah** (Star Wars), **Guy** vs Noah (Seafood); Episode winner: Guy (46 spaces)
19	10	"Episode 10"	18 May 2026	FLR-210	1,060,000
The Grand Finale has arrived, by the end of tonight, one of the 8 players left standing will take control of the entire floor, taking home the life changing $200,000 prize.: Duels played (8): Wednesday vs **Guy** (Moguls), Chris vs **Tyrone** (Australian Open), Tyrone vs **Guy** (Kylie), Guy vs **Inia** (Ancient Egypt), **Alex P** vs Inia (EPL), Jess vs **Alex P** (Sounds of Music), **Alex P** vs Kate (Red Carpet: Alex P, Oz Rock: Alex P; final result: 2-0); Season winner: Alex P

== Reception ==
=== Ratings ===
The Floor's season 1 premiere ended up garnering over 2.2 million viewers, a success for the network, making it the highest rating new series launch in VOZ history.The show averaged 1.3 million viewers across broadcast and streaming over its 9 episodes. The finale episode beat out every other non-news program.
