= Danielle Nicholls =

English television presenter and radio host

- Born: Danielle Audrey Nicholls; 16 December 1978 (age 47); Salford, Greater Manchester, England
- Years active: 1997–present
- Known for: Television presenter
- Spouse: Dean Holden

Danielle Audrey Nicholls is an English television presenter, radio host, model and singer best known for her presenting of CITV from 1998 to 2001, and Night Fever on Channel 5. She co-hosts a late Saturday night entertainment and phone in show "The Late Night Phone-In" on Talk TV with Andre Walker.

== Early life ==
Nicholls started dancing at the age of 9. At 15 she became the All England Modern Dance Champion, and had also passed two Royal Academy of Dance ballet exams with honours. She attended Moorside High School, Swinton and Oldham College. At about age 18, Nicholls became a member of the band Pure Gossip, and stayed with the group for 18 months.

== Presenting ==
In May 1998, out of 900 applicants, she was chosen to present CITV (then known as CiTV), which ran live, six days a week, and had an audience of four million viewers. On the show she interviewed celebrities such as, Britney Spears, Justin Timberlake and Victoria Beckham. She followed this with a behind-the-scenes special on Home and Away for ITV (TV network). On 1 May 2000, Nicholls began presenting the live broadcast ITV Day of Promise show with Eamonn Holmes and Carol Vorderman. She also presented the live CITV game show Mad for It.

After more than three years as a presenter on CITV, Nicholls left in December 2001.

She returned to children's TV as a presenter in the Saturday morning show Diggit. She continued as a presenter of three series of the Channel 5 celebrity karaoke show, Night Fever, until 2002. From 2000 to 2002 Nicholls co-hosted Night Fever on UK Channel 5, and its spin-off Beach Fever.

She appeared in the second series of Sooty Heights. In July 2002, Nicholls took over the continuity announcements for Sky Movies. She left in October 2003. In 2003, Nicholls toured the country with Mark Speight in the Speight of the Art roadshow.

In 2004, Nicholls presented on Tyne Tees the series, The Unprofessionals, where, along with co-presenter Giles Vickers-Smith, she was given different challenges, including pole dancing, a children's party entertainer, a drain unblocker and a taxidermist.

During Christmas 2004–05, Nicholls was a presenter on the NTL Broadband UK channel. Nicholls became one of the presenters of Text2Date, a programme that encouraged participants to meet and date using mobile phone text messages.

Nicholls' guest appearances on programmes include Trisha, The Last Word, This Morning, Bedrock, Boys & Girls, Dick & Dom in da Bungalow, Sport on 5 and Granada Soccer Night. She was also the voice behind the late night documentary series about North West nightlife called Party Fever which was shown on Granada.

Nicholls presented a radio show on Salford City Radio with her sister on 94.4FM, until March 2016.

Nicholls also presented and games on a Twitch channel with her sister (Jodie) and brother (Dean) known as BiigNoobs.

== Acting ==
Nicholls took a brief absence from CITV in December 2000 to play the lead role in the pantomime Snow White at the Opera House in Manchester. In subsequent years she appeared as Snow White in the other pantomimes at Northampton, Sunderland, Southport and Weston-super-Mare, and in December 2005/January 2006, playing another role as Fairy Crystal in the Snow White pantomime at the Grand Opera House in York.

As well as the annual pantomime performances, in 2004 she also starred on stage in the Hammond Production Group's The Young Ones Summer Holiday in Worthing.

== Personal life ==
Her sister is glamour model Jodie Nicholls.

In June 2006 she married Dean Holden, who was formerly manager of Charlton Athletic. Their daughter Cici Milly Holden died from meningococcal disease in May 2012, aged 17 months old, while on a family holiday in Lanzarote.
