= The Floor (game show) =

Game show

- Created by: John de Mol
- Years: 2023–present

Films and television
- Television series: The Floor (independent international versions, see below)

Miscellaneous
- Genre: Game show
- First aired: 8 January 2023; 3 years ago

The Floor is a game show franchise that originated in the Netherlands in 2023. Versions have been developed in other countries. The game is based around a floor divided into a grid of squares initially each representing a different contestant with expertise in a different trivia category. The contestants compete with neighbouring contestants in head to-head trivia "duels" with the winner's "territory" expanding into the square(s) of the floor that were controlled by the losing player.

The game progresses over the course of a season with the grand prize awarded to the player who ultimately controls the entire floor, with secondary prizes awarded throughout the season to the player with the most territory at the end of each episode.

== Format ==
In the original Dutch version, 100 contestants compete over the course of an entire season, standing in separate spaces of a 10x10 LED grid displayed on the studio floor. Each contestant has a nominated specialist subject. One contestant is chosen at random and shown the topics for all adjacent opponents. The contestant chooses one opponent to play against, and the two step out of the grid to participate in a duel on the opponent’s topic.

In the duel, the contestants are given separate 45-second clocks, with only one running at any given time. The contestant is shown a text prompt or a picture of something associated with the challenged opponent’s topic and must identify it. Multiple guesses are allowed, and the contestant must give a correct answer in order to stop their own clock and turn the next question over to the opponent whose clock then starts. Contestants may pass on a picture if desired, but incur a three-second penalty before the next one is shown to them.

The first contestant whose clock runs out is eliminated from the game with no winnings, and the victorious opponent claims all territory held by that person in addition to their own. Their allocated topic is now whichever topic was not played in the duel. They may then either challenge another adjacent opponent with a duel on that opponent’s topic, or return to the floor; in the latter case, a new contestant is chosen at random.

At the end of each episode, the contestant who has claimed the most territory wins a cash prize. The last contestant standing at the end of the season takes the entire floor and wins the grand prize.

The American version featured 81 contestants on a 9x9 floor grid in its first season, an episode prize of $20,000, and a grand prize of $250,000 for the season winner. Players who have already dueled are excluded from the random selection, unless all remaining players have already won a duel. All seasons since season 2 featured 100 contestants on a 10x10 floor grid, and added a 5-second time bonus for any contestant winning 3 duels in a row. All seasons since season 2 feature a best of 3 match for the final duel, allowing all assigned topics to play. In Season 4, contestants who achieve three consecutive duel victories will be able to choose to steal a category from another player or receive a time boost. In addition, one space will be secretly designated as the "Golden Square", which will reward a $10,000 bonus to whoever wins a duel after the category from that square is challenged. In Season 5 the "Territory Freeze" was introduced for the player who won the most duels by the middle of the season. From this point, no one can challenge this player; the territory will be unfrozen after all players have dueled at least once.

== International versions ==
Country	Title	Premiere date	Series				
Country	Title	Premiere date	Season	Year(s) aired	Winner(s)	Presenter(s)	Broadcaster
Arab World	The Floor: Al Ard Lak Eksabha	10 November 2026	1	2026	Current season	Lubna Abdulaziz	MBC1
Argentina	The Floor, la conquista	19 August 2024	1	2024-25	Cycle 1: Ivo; Cycle 2: Enrique; Cycle 3: Jonathan; Cycle 4: Lautaro; Cycle 5: Agustín; Cycle 6: Agostina; Cycle 7: Hernán; Cycle 8: Amparo; Cycle 9: Brenda; Cycle 10: Ezequiel; Cycle 11: Miranda; Cycle 12: Lara; Cycle 13: Tomás; Cycle 14: Sofía; Cycle 15: Mónica; Cycle 16: Rodrigo; Cycle 17: Bárbara; Cycle 18: Francisco; Cycle 19: Juan; Cycle 20: Elizabeth; Cycle 21: Nicolás; Cycle 22: Sebastián; Cycle 23: Gonzalo; Cycle 24: Hernán	Guido Kaczka	El Trece
Australia	The Floor	28 April 2025	1	2025	Patrick Neasey	Rodger Corser	Nine Network
Australia	The Floor	28 April 2025	2	2026	Alex Palmer	Rodger Corser	Nine Network
Australia	The Floor	28 April 2025	3	TBA	Upcoming season	Rodger Corser	Nine Network
Belgium (Flanders)	The Floor	5 October 2024	1	2024	Jelle	Bruno Wyndaele	VTM
Belgium (Flanders)	The Floor	5 October 2024	2	2026	Abdel	Bruno Wyndaele	VTM
Bulgaria	The Floor: Превземи играта	21 February 2026	1	2026	Diana Blazheva	Julian Kostov	NOVA
Chile	The Floor Chile	16 March 2025	1	2025	Cycle 1: Andrés; Cycle 2: Karina; Cycle 3: Fabián; Cycle 4: Benjamín; Cycle 5: Cristóbal; Cycle 6: Ricardo; Cycle 7: Francisco; Cycle 8: Jaime Lynch; Cycle 9: Jaime González; Cycle 10: Valentina; Cycle 11: José Luis; Cycle 12: Iván; Cycle 13: Camila Adad	Eduardo Fuentes	TVN
Czech Republic	The Floor	TBA	1	2027	Upcoming season	TBA	TV Nova
Denmark	Feltet – Danmarks største quizkamp	15 March 2025	1	Spring 2025	Jens Vestergaard	Lise Rønne	TV 2 Charlie
Denmark	Feltet – Danmarks største quizkamp	15 March 2025	2	Autumn 2025	Mads	Lise Rønne	TV 2 Charlie
Denmark	Feltet – Danmarks største quizkamp	15 March 2025	3 (celebrity edition)	Autumn 2025	Jakob Fauerby	Lise Rønne	TV 2 Charlie
Denmark	Feltet – Danmarks største quizkamp	15 March 2025	4	2026	Jens	Lise Rønne	TV 2 Charlie
Estonia	The Floor — valluta võidupõrand	8 September 2025	1	2025	Cycle 1: Silver Jõffert; Cycle 2: Madleen Vapper; Cycle 3: Riivo Lehiste; Cycle 4: Jaagup Trepp; Cycle 5: Holger Sirel; Cycle 6: Karl Hendrik Kõiva; Cycle 7: Elerile Kang; Cycle 8: Siret Tuula; Cycle 9: Marit Elvast; Cycle 10: Aarne Toom; Cycle 11: Arnold Veltmann; Cycle 12: Georg-Mihkel Kodi	Roald Johannson	TV3
Finland	The Floor Suomi	5 March 2025	1	2025	Ossi Hentunen	Janne Kataja	MTV3
Finland	The Floor Suomi	5 March 2025	2	TBA	Upcoming season	Janne Kataja	MTV3
France	The Floor, à la conquête du sol	30 December 2023	1	2023-24	Angélique Luders	Cyril Féraud	France 2
France	The Floor, à la conquête du sol	30 December 2023	2	2024-25	Nicolas	Cyril Féraud	France 2
France	The Floor, à la conquête du sol	30 December 2023	3	2025-26	Christophe	Cyril Féraud	France 2
France	The Floor, à la conquête du sol	30 December 2023	4	2026	Sara	Cyril Féraud	France 2
France	The Floor, à la conquête du sol	30 December 2023	5	TBA	Upcoming season	Cyril Féraud	France 2
Germany	The Floor	29 February 2024	1	2024	Jan	Matthias Opdenhövel	Sat.1
Germany	The Floor	29 February 2024	2	2025	Leslie	Matthias Opdenhövel	Sat.1
Greece	The Floor	17 October 2025	1	2025	Andreas Tsemperlidis	Giorgos Lianos	Skai TV
Greece	The Floor	17 October 2025	2	Winter 2026	Stefanos Limnaios	Giorgos Lianos	Skai TV
Greece	The Floor	17 October 2025	3	Spring 2026	Vicky Spyropoulou	Giorgos Lianos	Skai TV
Hungary	The Floor – Csak egy maradhat	6 May 2024	1	2024	Cycle 1: Zoltán Navarra; Cycle 2: Gergely Salavecz; Cycle 3: Andrea Bíró; Cycle 4: Csaba Csillik; Cycle 5: András Mező; Drága Örökösök special edition: Balázs Varga	Zoltán Szujó	RTL
Hungary	The Floor – Csak egy maradhat	6 May 2024	1	2025	Cycle 6: Gergő Meszlényi	Zoltán Szujó	RTL
Hungary	The Floor – Csak egy maradhat	6 May 2024	2	2025	Cycle 1: Barna; Cycle 2: Márk Lengyel; Cycle 3: Zsani	Zoltán Szujó	RTL
Hungary	The Floor – Csak egy maradhat	6 May 2024	2	2026	Cycle 4: Peti; Cycle 5: Nóra	Zoltán Szujó	RTL
Hungary	The Floor – Csak egy maradhat	6 May 2024	3	2027	Upcoming season	Zoltán Szujó	RTL
Israel	הזירה; Hazirah	13 April 2025	1	Spring 2025	Lavi Miednik	Reshef Levi	KAN 11
Israel	הזירה; Hazirah	13 April 2025	2	Summer 2025	Benjamin Eliash	Reshef Levi	KAN 11
Israel	הזירה; Hazirah	13 April 2025	3	Autumn 2025	Maya Motola	Reshef Levi	KAN 11
Israel	הזירה; Hazirah	13 April 2025	4	2026	Aliza Alma	Reshef Levi	KAN 11
Italy	The Floor – Ne rimarrà solo uno	2 January 2024	1	Winter 2024	Remo Sciutto	Ciro Priello and Fabio Balsamo	Rai 2
Italy	The Floor – Ne rimarrà solo uno	2 January 2024	2	Autumn 2024	Paolo Casa	Ciro Priello and Fabio Balsamo	Rai 2
Italy	The Floor – Ne rimarrà solo uno	2 January 2024	3	2026	Agnese Primo	Paola Perego and Gabriele Vagnato	Rai 2
Japan	The Floor	28 March 2026	1	March 2026	Shinya Kote	Junichi Okada	Nippon TV
Japan	The Floor	28 March 2026	2	October-November 2026	Toshifumi Fujimoto	Junichi Okada	Nippon TV
Japan	The Floor	28 March 2026	3	December 2026	Upcoming season	Junichi Okada	Nippon TV
Latvia	The Floor — Pārņem laukumu	21 February 2026	1	2026	Cycle 1: Beāte Lielmane; Cycle 2: Toms Akmens; Cycle 3: Jānis Romanovskis	Emīls Balceris	TV3
Lithuania	Užvaldyk aikštelę. The Floor	1 March 2026	1	2026	Cycle 1: Audrius Strabulis; Cycle 2: Audrius; Cycle 3: Paulius Ke.	Marijonas Mikutavičius	TV3
Netherlands (original format)	The Floor	8 January 2023	1	2023	Robin	Edson da Graça	RTL 4
Netherlands (original format)	The Floor	8 January 2023	2	2024	Rachel	Edson da Graça	RTL 4
Netherlands (original format)	The Floor	8 January 2023	3	Winter 2025	Hilde; Celebrity edition: Thomas van Luyn	Edson da Graça	RTL 4
Netherlands (original format)	The Floor	8 January 2023	4	Summer 2025	Lars	Carlo Boszhard	RTL 4
Netherlands (original format)	The Floor	8 January 2023	5	2026	Gwen	Carlo Boszhard	RTL 4
Poland	The Floor	20 May 2025	1	Spring 2025	Jakub Dominiak	Mikołaj Roznerski	TVN
Poland	The Floor	20 May 2025	2	Autumn 2025	Cycle 1: Karolina Ziółkowska-Bagdzińska; Cycle 2: Natalia Wychowaniak; Cycle 3: Monika Bańdurska	Mikołaj Roznerski	TVN
Poland	The Floor	20 May 2025	3	Spring 2026	Cycle 1: Michał Kupis; Celebrity edition: Maria Jeleniewska; Cycle 2: Jacek Pietruszkiewicz; Cycle 3: Kamila Sitarska	Mikołaj Roznerski	TVN
Poland	The Floor	20 May 2025	4	Autumn 2026	VIP Challenge: Adam Mirek; Cycle 1: Piotr Piwoński; VIP Challenge: Mateusz Hładki; Cycle 2: Current series	Mikołaj Roznerski	TVN
Portugal	The Floor	14 September 2024	1	2024	João Grilo	Vasco Palmeirim	RTP1
Portugal	The Floor	14 September 2024	2	2025	Pedro Silva	Vasco Palmeirim	RTP1
Portugal	The Floor	14 September 2024	3	2026	Ana Carolina Isidoro	Vasco Palmeirim	RTP1
Romania	The Floor	14 September 2024	1	2024	Cycle 1: Alex; Cycle 2: Eduard; Cycle 3: Oliver; Cycle 4: Ilinca	Dan Negru	Kanal D
Romania	The Floor	14 September 2024	2	2025	Denis	Dan Negru	Kanal D
Romania	The Floor	14 September 2024	3	Spring 2026	Cycle 1: Francisc; Cycle 2: Diana	Dan Negru	Kanal D
Romania	The Floor	14 September 2024	4	Autumn 2026	Cycle 1: Andreea; Cycle 2: Alina	Dan Negru	Kanal D
Spain	The Floor	6 September 2023	1	2023	Mireia Gil	Manel Fuentes	Antena 3
Spain	The Floor	6 September 2023	2	2025	Mercedes Evangelista	Chenoa	La 1
Spain	The Floor	6 September 2023	3	2026	Geraldine Pérez	Chenoa	La 1
Spain	The Floor	6 September 2023	4	TBA	Upcoming season	Chenoa	La 1
Sweden	The Floor Sverige	4 September 2024	1	2024	Ulf Ödesjö	Anders Jansson and Erik Ekstrand	Kanal 5 Max
Turkey	Alan	13 June 2024	1	2024	Cycle 1: Begüm Rabia; Cycle 2: Berkin	Oktay Kaynarca	ATV
Ukraine	Поле; Pole	7 March 2024	1	Spring 2024	Anna Monastyrova	Yefym Konstantynovskyi	Novyi Kanal
Ukraine	Поле; Pole	7 March 2024	2	Autumn 2024	Cycle 1: Anastasiia Malieieva; Cycle 2: Vitaliia Pohrebniak; Cycle 3: Vasyl Polishchuk	Yefym Konstantynovskyi	Novyi Kanal
Ukraine	Поле; Pole	7 March 2024	3	2025	Cycle 1: Viktoriia Kost; Cycle 2: Mykhailo Osadchyi; Cycle 3: Olha Popova	Yefym Konstantynovskyi	Novyi Kanal
United Kingdom	The Floor	4 January 2026	1	2026	Stephen Stanley	Rob Brydon	ITV
United Kingdom	The Floor	4 January 2026	2	2027	Upcoming series	Rob Brydon	ITV
United States	The Floor	2 January 2024	1	Winter 2024	Jacquelyn Kenny	Rob Lowe	Fox
United States	The Floor	2 January 2024	2	Autumn 2024	Keelan von Ehrenkrook	Rob Lowe	Fox
United States	The Floor	2 January 2024	3	Spring 2025	Steven Havens	Rob Lowe	Fox
United States	The Floor	2 January 2024	4	Autumn 2025	Ashley Washburn	Rob Lowe	Fox
United States	The Floor	2 January 2024	5	Spring 2026	Lauren Wise Samet	Rob Lowe	Fox
United States	The Floor	2 January 2024	6	Autumn 2026	Current season	Rob Lowe	Fox
Uruguay	The Floor, la conquista	12 March 2025	1	2025	Cycle 1: Verónica Penna; Cycle 2: Javier Gutiérrez; Cycle 3: Florencia Bálsamo; Cycle 4: Eduardo Espinosa	Aldo Cauteruccio	Teledoce

=== Unlicensed versions ===
Country	Title	Premiere date	Series				
Country	Title	Premiere date	Season	Year(s) aired	Winner(s)	Presenter(s)	Broadcaster
Belarus	Один на один	10 October 2026	1	2026	Cycle 1: Current series Cycle 2: Upcoming series	Pavel Filimonov	ONT
Iran	مسابقه صد; The 100	10 September 2025	1	2025-26	Cycle 1: Reza Ahmadi; Cycle 2: Mohammad Reza Panahlou; Cycle 3: Forough Naderi; Cycle 4: Aliasghar Rezaei; Cycle 5: Mohammad Ahmadbeiki; Cycle 6: Ahmadreza Siyahi	Hadi Hejazifar	IRIB TV3

== See also ==
- List of television game show franchises
