= Paul Lamb (musician) =

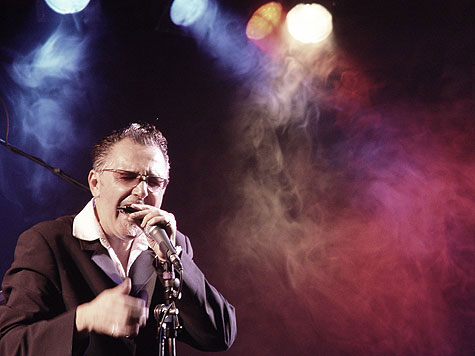
- Paul Lamb 2007

Background information
- Born: Paul Lamb; 9 July 1955 (age 71); Blyth, Northumberland, England
- Genre: Blues
- Occupations: Harmonicist, singer, songwriter
- Instruments: Harmonica, vocals
- Years active: 1970s-present
- Labels: Secret Records, Red Lightnin' Records, Indigo Records, various
- Website: Official website

Paul Lamb (born 9 July 1955, Blyth, Northumberland, England) is a British blues harmonica player and bandleader. He has had a more than five-decade long career as a blues harmonicist and bandleader.

== Biography ==
Lamb started playing the harmonica during his childhood, inspired by Sonny Terry, and he was fortunate to meet and collaborate with him after beginning to perform in clubs by the age of fifteen. Lamb played only acoustic blues until about 1980. Lamb also played alongside his heroes such as Buddy Guy, Junior Wells, and Brownie McGhee. He formed the Blues Burglars with guitarist Johnny Whitehill in the early 1980s, a formation that eventually became Paul Lamb & the King Snakes. They released an eponymous album with Ace Records in 1990, followed by several others, each building both Lamb's personal reputation as a harmonica player and the band's prestige. He was awarded the British Blues Connection's annual award for the best local harmonica player several years in a row while the King Snakes frequently took the title as best band.

As a consequence, his own harmonica skills have been in demand, and he had a hit in 1994 in the UK Singles Chart with the track, "Harmonica Man" (under the pseudonym of Bravado) with Pete Waterman. Lamb has also worked with Mark Knopfler, The Who and Jimmy Nail, played on BBC and film soundtracks, and various television commercials in the UK.

Lamb was more recently inducted into the British Blues Awards Hall of Fame. Blues & Rhythm magazine described his band as "lazily cocksure and coolly aggressive".

In 2011 he recorded a session for Paul Jones' BBC Radio 2 show.

Members of the King Snakes band have included guitarist John Whitehill, singer/guitarists Johnny Dickinson and Chad Strentz, bassists Jim Mercer, Dave Stevens, and Rod Demick, drummers Mike Thorne, Martin Deegan, Alan Savage, Daniel Strittmatter, and Sonny Below, and Paul's son Ryan on lead guitar.

In 2018 the band included Paul Lamb, Ryan Lamb, Chad Strentz, bassist Rod Demick, and drummer Mike Thorne.

== Discography ==
- The Blues Burglars: Breaking In (Red Lightnin' 0070, 1987) LP only
- Paul Lamb & the King Snakes (Blue Horizon 011, 1990)
- Shifting into Gear (Tight & Juicy 656.834, 1992; Indigo Delux 504, 1997)
- Fine Condition (Indigo Recordings 2019, 1995)
- She's a Killer (Indigo Delux 503, 1996)
- John Henry Jumps In (Indigo Delux 512, 1998)
- The Blue Album (Indigo Delux 521, 1999)
- Paul Lamb & The Blues Burglars: Whoopin' (Indigo Delux 522, 1999)
- Take Your Time and Get It Right (Indigo Delux 531, 2000)
- Live at the 100 Club (14th May 2002) (Indigo Recordings 2517, 2002; Castle Music 1280, 2005)
- Harmonica Man: The Paul Lamb Anthology 1986–2002 (Castle Music 06076 81310 26, 2003) 2-CD compilation
- I'm on a Roll (United Producers Records 1001; SPV/Blue Label 97522, 2005)
- Snakes & Ladders (28th September 2006) (SPV/Blue Label 49302, 2006 [2007])
- Mind Games (Secret Records 026, 2010)
- The Games People Play (Secret Records 052, 2012)
- Goin' Down This Road (BluRoots [no number], 2013; Big Shed Music Co. 03, 2017)
- Hole in the Wall (Secret Records 097, 2014)
- After Hours: The Country Blues Sessions (Big Shed Music Co. 01, 2016)
- Live at the Royal Albert Hall (Big Shed Music Co. 02, 2017)
- Paul Lamb & Roosevelt Houserockers: Keep on Walking Live 2019 (Plan 9 Trash Records 190, 2020)
