= Vero Building Systems =

American company producing construction materials

- Type: Private
- Industry: Construction
- Founded: March 2021

Vero Building Systems is a company that manufactures prefabricated panels of steel mesh and polystyrene, which are covered by concrete on-site. With these alternative construction materials, the structural insulated panels are used to create "disaster-proof" buildings that can withstand category 5 hurricanes.

== Description ==
Vero Building Systems produces modular expanded polystyrene panels inside a steel mesh, which "can be used to build residential single-family homes, multi-family buildings, schools, hospitals, bridges, restaurants, office buildings, industrial sheds and more". CNN's Champions for Change described the potential of this concrete and styrofoam product as a system to construct environmentally responsible homes in hurricane areas. The company's designs promise "lower production costs than traditional construction, with a fraction of the usual carbon footprint", "30% cheaper and up to 40% faster than traditional building systems".

The company uses proprietary CAD software to produce 3D panel prints, designing and then prefabricating expanded polystyrene panels, including conduits for plumbing and wiring. These expanded polystyrene panels are modular and enclosed by double-galvanized steel mesh. According to the Disaster Recovery Journal, the panels meet category 5 hurricanes certification standards: "They can survive earthquakes up to a 10 on the Richter scale, winds up to 150 mph, and windborne objects projected at 66mph with no damage." Unlike finished surfaces such as siding or shingles, Vero's panels are fire resistant, self-extinguishing, bulletproof, and blast resistant. The panels have been tested withstanding an explosion of three tons per square foot.

== History ==
Vero founder Annette Rubin's interest in construction materials and in building hurricane-safe homes began after Hurricane Michael, a category 5 storm that landed in 2018 east of her Florida home, where the residential building code only required constructions to withstand category 3 storms. She learned of Emmedue, an Italian company producing a concrete panel building system "with 77 plants worldwide and millions of structures built to date".

In March 2021, Annette Rubin and Ahtyba Rubin co-founded Vero Building Systems in the United States, licensing the "Emmedue M2", which was described as "panelized building technology, featuring steel-reinforced polystyrene panels." In August 2022, the company filed as a Florida Limited Liability Company, and registered the "VERO Building Systems" trademark in February 2023.

Vero Building Systems opened a 52,000 sq ft (4,800 m^{2}) plant in Kissimmee, Florida, in March 2023. In May 2023, it began production of lightweight structural concrete panels of steel, concrete, and expanded polystyrene insulated panels, or "SCIP" (structural concrete insulated panels), also described as "a rigid, closed cell, thermoplastic foam material".

The styrofoam center of each panel provides insulation and sound-proofing, and the steel wire frame connects concrete slabs on each end of the panel. Panels are also available with conduits for plumbing and wiring.

== See also ==
List of building materials
