= Véro =

- Starring: Véronique Cloutier
- Country of origin: Canada
- Original language: French

Production
- Running time: 60 mins. (Sept. 2005-Dec. 2005); 30 mins (Jan. 2006-May 2006)

Original release
- Network: Radio-Canada
- Release: September 12, 2005 – May 5, 2006

Véro was a Canadian talk show hosted by Véronique Cloutier (previously a host of La Fureur), which aired on Radio-Canada.

The show originally aired Monday through Thursday live at 6:00 p.m. Eastern Time, and also aired live over much of the country from Manitoba eastward, though tape delayed at 5:00 p.m. in Mountain and Pacific time zones.

The placement at 6:00 p.m. displaced the hour-long regional Le Téléjournal newscasts in Quebec and Ontario, moving the program back a half-hour to 5:00 p.m. ET, dislodging the regional portion from 6:00 p.m. to 5:30 p.m. Le Téléjournal followed Véro at 6:00 p.m. local time from Manitoba westward, and in the Maritimes, where it preceded Véro at 6:00 p.m. AT.

At the new timeslot, the newscast was watched by only 8% of the audience; in the previous year, the newscast averaged 10% of the audience.

After airing the final hour-long episode on December 8, Radio-Canada changed course and the news returned at 6:00 p.m. on December 12, now with the regional segment first. Then Vice-President of CBC/Radio-Canada, Robert Rabinovitch, called the original displacement of the news peut-être une erreur: perhaps a mistake. Véro would return after the winter hiatus, with a modified format: a half-hour every weekday at 5:00 p.m. starting January 9, 2006.

The show was later canceled and the last episode aired on May 5, 2006.
