= Véronique Cloutier =

Canadian television and radio personality

Véronique Cloutier CQ
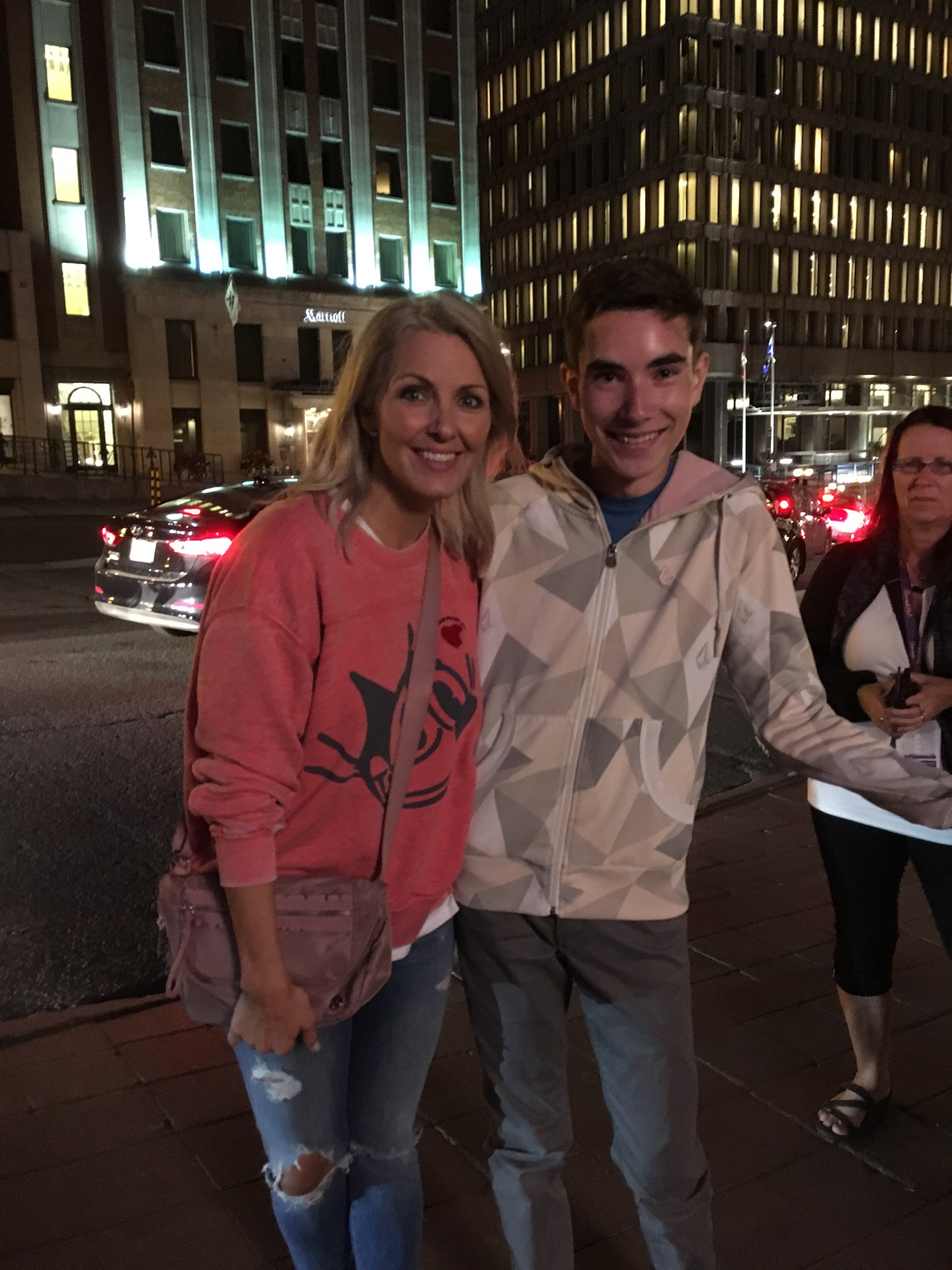
- Born: December 31, 1974 (age 51); Montreal, Quebec, Canada
- Occupations: TV host, radio personality

Véronique Cloutier CQ (born December 31, 1974), also known as Véro, is a Canadian TV and radio personality. She is the daughter of Guy Cloutier and the sister of Stéphanie Cloutier. She has hosted various programs on Radio-Canada, including La Fureur, Véro and Paquet Voleur. Her daily show Le Véro Show on Rouge FM My Heart is one of the most popular Quebec radio programs.

== Biography ==
=== Career ===
While in high school, Cloutier worked on the radio program Bonjour Champion on CKAC. She also worked on the campus radio station of the University of Montreal, CISM-FM, on the radio program Virus Chronique. Her first television appearance was on the program Les mini-stars on the Quebec television network TVA in 1990.

In September 1993, Cloutier attended a public audition for the television channel MusiquePlus and was offered a job with the channel. Various programs that she hosted included Combat des clips, Le décompte MusiquePlus and Vox Pop. From 1995 to 1997, she hosted her own program called Véro Show.

In August 1997, she left MusiquePlus to join Radio-Canada. Her first job with the channel was the quiz show La Tête de l'emploi.

Her career reached new heights after hosting La Fureur, a weekly game show where celebrities answer questions related to music. It became one of the highest rated programs in Quebec with more than 1,200,000 viewers each week. In the fall of 1999, she would host the Gala de l'ADISQ, Quebec's major music awards show.

In April 2002 Cloutier was master of ceremonies at the Molson Centre in Montreal at the event La Fureur de Céline, in which 15,000 fans saw Céline Dion perform. In the summer of 2002, she starred in her first film, Les Dangereux, directed by Louis Saia and produced by Richard Goudreau. In December 2007 she was hired by the Royal Canadian Mint as a campaign spokesperson for the launch of an ad campaign in Quebec. She signed on to represent the Mint for three years.

In 2008, Cloutier was involved in several projects. She was the host of the Prix Gemeaux, the French Canadian equivalent of the Gemini Awards.

In December 2008, Cloutier hosted Radio-Canada's annual New Year's TV special, Bye Bye. The show, produced by Cloutier and Louis Morissette, received over 1,300 complaints from viewers finding it vulgar, angry and racist for material that included sketches on the assassination of then-American president-elect Barack Obama, jokes about Nathalie Simard, who was sexually assaulted as a child by Guy Cloutier (her father), and for anglophone-bashing.

=== Personal life ===
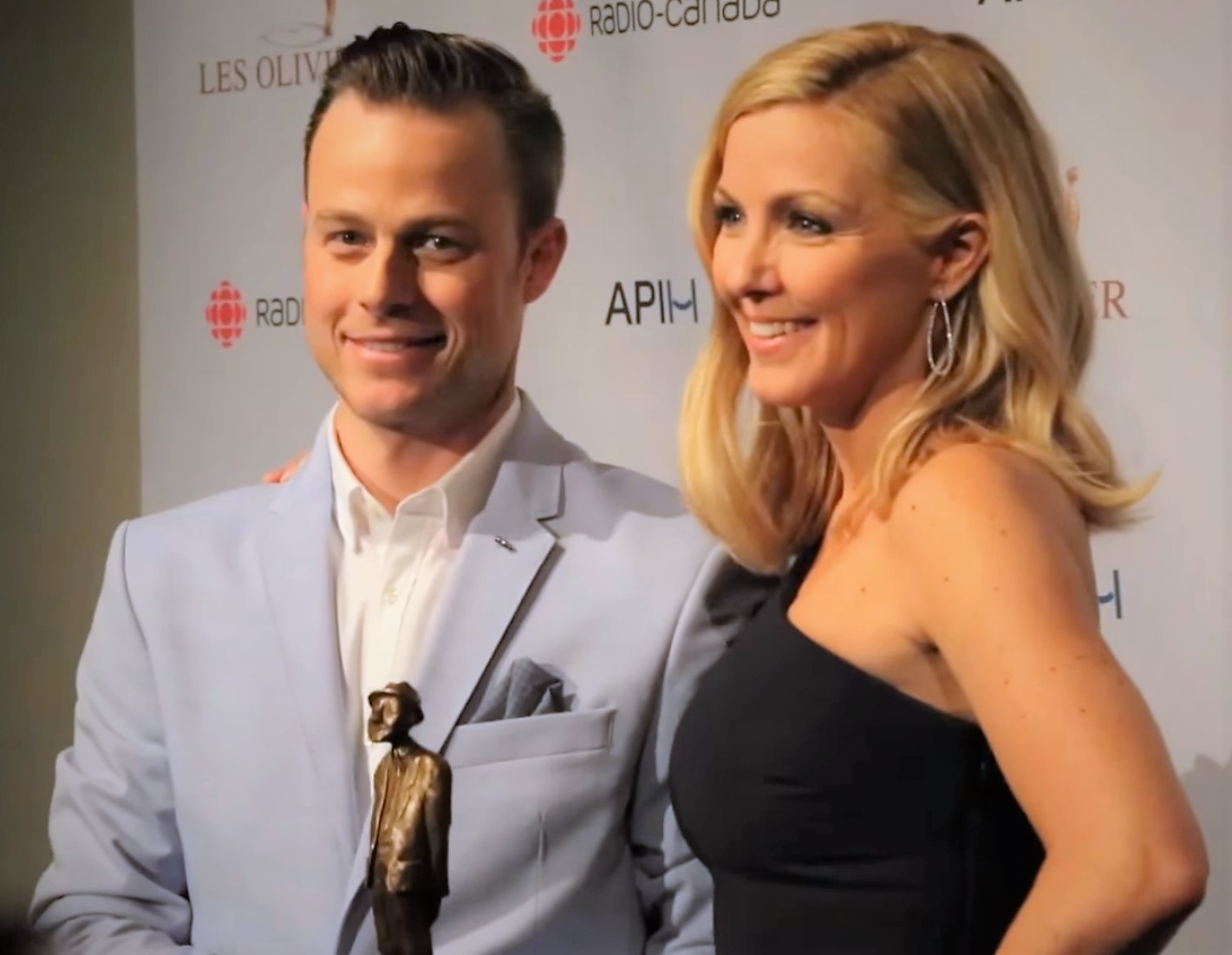
Louis Morissette and Cloutier on Montreal.TV in 2016.

Cloutier's husband is Louis Morissette, a French Canadian comedian. Together, they have two daughters, Delphine Cloutier-Morissette and Raphaelle Cloutier-Morissette, and a son, Justin Cloutier-Morissette.

Cloutier was named a knight of the National Order of Quebec in 2024.
