= Arthur (TV presenter) =

French television presenter, producer and comedian (born 1966)

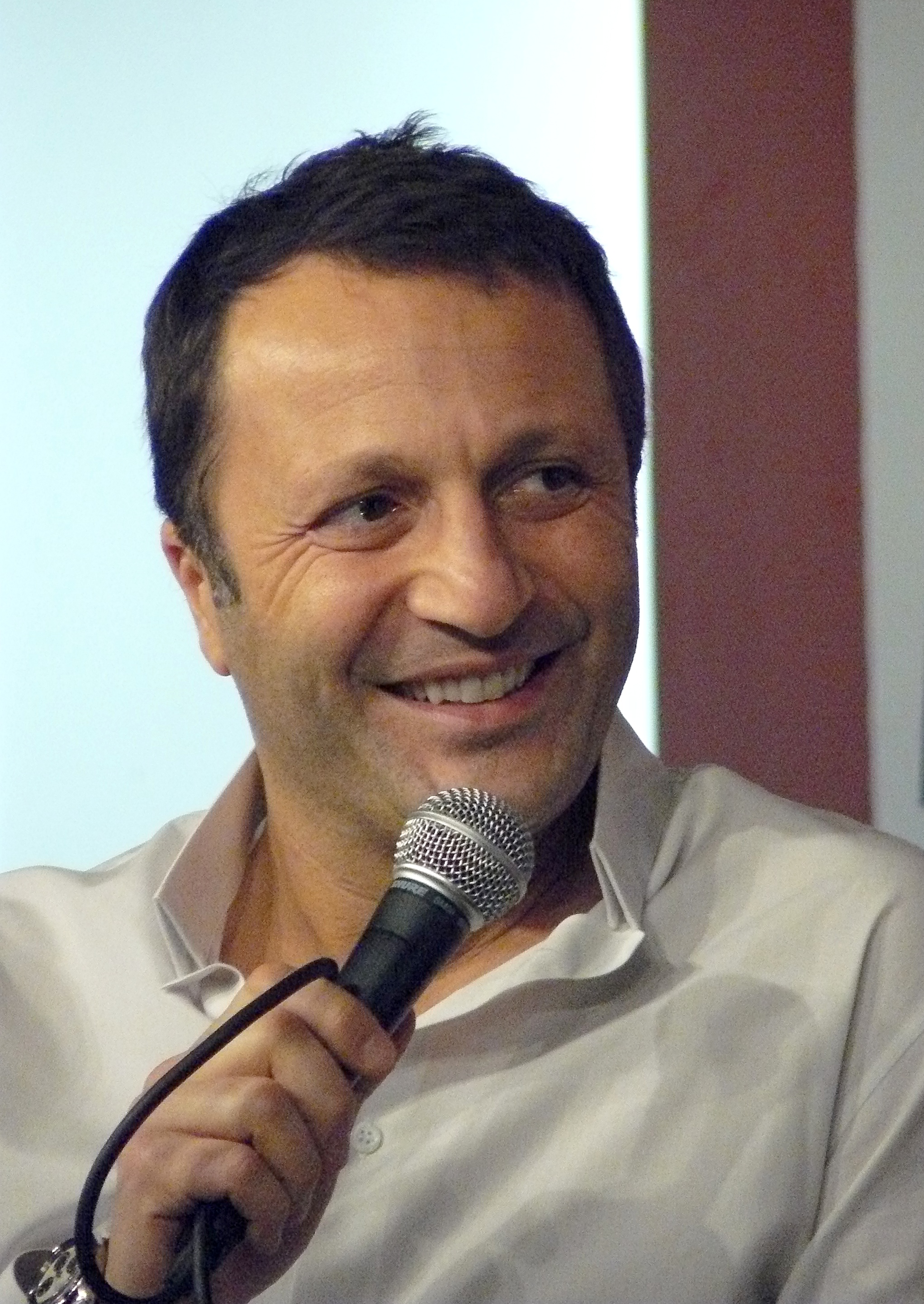
- Arthur in 2010
- Born: Jacques Essebag; 10 March 1966 (age 60); Casablanca, Morocco
- Occupations: Television host, producer, comedian
- Years active: 1981–present
- Spouse(s): Estelle Lefébure (m. 2004; div. 2008) Mareva Galanter (m. 2017)
- Children: 1

Jacques Essebag (French pronunciation: [ʒak ɛsəbaɡ], Arabic: جاك الصباغ; born 10 March 1966), better known by his stage name Arthur (pronounced [aʁtyʁ]), is a French television presenter, producer, and comedian.

After dropping from law studies, he began his career as a host on local radio in the Paris region in the late 1980s. In the early 1990s, he found a certain notoriety by presenting programs on Fun Radio, Europe 1 and Europe 2 (Arthur et les pirates, PlanetArthur and Radio Arthur). Starting in 1991, he became the host of television programs, first on France 2 and TF1 (Les Enfants de la télé, La Fureur).

Meanwhile, he started a theatrical career with two one-man shows, Arthur en vrai (2005) and I Show (2009) and portraying Peter Brochan in Le Dîner de Cons (2007), alongside Dany Boon.

Since the mid-1990s, he has also been an entrepreneur in the audiovisual field. He was, until 2006, vice president of the French subsidiary of production company Endemol. Since 2008, he has been the owner of Ouï FM.

== Early years ==
Jacques Essebag was born on 10 March 1966 in Casablanca. His father, Michel Essebag, was a chartered accountant and his mother a housewife. He has a brother Olivier. Like many Moroccan Jews, his parents left Morocco in 1967, during the Six-Day War and settled in the Paris region, in Massy. After high school, he began studying law at Sceaux, at the Faculty of Law Jean Monnet of the University of Paris-Sud 11. While he repeated his first year, he made his debut radio broadcast, on the local radio station Massy-Pal, on which he hosted the show Tonus which provided sports scores for the city.

== Radio career ==
In 1987, he became a presenter on RFM. He took the pseudonym of Arthur to distinguish from a homonym. In 1988, he spent a short time on Kiss Fm, then joined Skyrock in 1989. With Skyman, he created Les zigotos du matin.

=== 1990s ===
In 1991, he joined Fun Radio to host programs from 6:30 am–9:00 am, in which he created games such as the provocative Orgasmotron (simulation of a live female orgasm). His notoriety grew when, thanks to a publicity campaign for his program in which he presented himself as "the greatest cunt of the FM band". On Fun, he met Emmanuel Lévy, aka Maître Lévy, who became his director and accompanied him in his TV career.

He left Fun Radio the following season in 1992 to join Europe 1, which wanted to rejuvenate its audience. There he hosted for four seasons Arthur et les pirates, between 4.30 pm-6.00 pm, with Maître Levy, Alexandre Devois (Captain Sboob), Princess Jade (met on Skyrock), Rémy Caccia and Michèle Bernier. He hosted the same games as he did on Fun. During the first season, the show took place among the audience.

In September 1996, he returned on Europe 2 to host La Matinale from 8 am to 9:30 am, then from 7:30 am to 9 am from 1997. The show was recorded a series of sketches with false listeners. The humoristic team was composed of Maître Levy, Gad Elmaleh, Axelle Laffont, Tex, Gus (Gustave de Kervern of Groland), François Meunier (JC of Skyrock) and Philippe Lelièvre.

=== 2000s ===
At the beginning of 2000, Arthur left Europe 2 and hosted PlanetArthur on Fun Radio, every afternoon from 4.00 pm to 6.30 pm, alongside Maître Levy, Myriam, Valérie Benaïm and Cyril Hanouna.

When Sébastien Cauet arrived on Fun Radio in September 2004, Arthur wanted to leave the radio and contacted his lawyers. He alleged, in effect, that Cauet had previously made a joke about Nazi concentration camps in 1995 and therefore refused to work on the same radio. Fun Radio did not accept to let him go, arguing that the contract ended on 30 June 2005 and forced him to continue to host PlanèteArthur, in September 2004. Arthur then made three programs entitled Libérez Arthur, in which he explicitly asked to be released from his contract, particularly in disseminating support messages from his friends from show business and did some parodies of the station Director, played by Jonathan Lambert. On 9 September, Fun Radio stopped the broadcast. In November 2004, a court broke the contract with Fun Radio for the benefit of the radio, but not allow damages. In October 2007, Arthur and Cauet finally reconciled : Cauet attended a performance of Le Diner de Cons, then Arthur participated in La Méthode Cauet, on 20 December 2007, then Cauet was invited to the evening of Christmas Eve, on 31 December 2007, hosted by Arthur.

A few months later, he moved to Europe 2 on which he hosted Arthur et les Pirates between 4.00 pm and 6.00 pm, with Maître Levy, Princesse Jade and Jonathan Lambert. His first show was the world record of running of a radio show (33 consecutive hours, from 25 November 2004, 4:00 pm, to 26 November, 1:00 am). This record was later beaten by Cauet on Fun Radio. This program, entitled 33 heures chrono, was produced as DVD and adapted in a series of programs on MCM.

From September 2005 to February 2006, he hosted a new program, Radio Arthur, with Manu Levy, Jaz and Jonathan Lambert.

== TV career ==
In 1992, he began a TV career with L'Émission impossible on TF1. The program, aired on Friday night at midnight, was stylistically a mix of talk show and provocative sketches in the style of Howard Stern. The show was a failure but introduced to the general public comedians such as Élie Semoun, Dieudonné, Laurent Violet and Alexandre Devoise.

In 1994, he presented on France 2 Les Enfants de la télé, alongside Pierre Tchernia. On France 2, he also hosted in 1996, La Fureur du samedi soir, a karaoke program co-presented by Pascal Sevran. Later he exported these programs on TF1 at the same time as Les Enfants de la télé. He also co-hosted the Victoires de la Musique with Michel Drucker.

Arthur then launched other entertainments on TF1, like Rêve d'un soir and 120 minutes de bonheur. The show CIA, co-hosted and co-produced in 2001 by Dominique Farrugia, was a failure. The program consisted of a series of humorous journalistic investigations.

Arthur also produced other successful programs such as Exclusif on TF1 or La Grosse Émission on Comédie !, through his company named Case Productions, which he was co-owner with producer Stéphane Courbit, and which was later renamed ASP.

In 2001, Arthur became vice president of Endemol France, created after the acquisition of ASP by Endemol. The company launched many TV reality shows in France. Endemol France bought many other production companies and Arthur sold his shares in Endemol in late 2006.

Arthur continued to host Les Enfants de la Télé and other successful programs including TF1's À prendre ou à laisser, a local version of Deal or No Deal. He presented the 2007 NRJ Music Awards on 20 January 2007. His show was sponsored by NRJ Radio.

In August 2007, he decided to leave À prendre ou à laisser to devote himself to his new theatrical career in Le Dîner de Cons. Les Enfants de la télé and the Christmas Eve remain at present his only TV shows.

On 5 January 2009, he hosted again À prendre ou à laisser for a quarter year.

Since 8 November 2010, Arthur hosts Ce Soir Avec Arthur on the Comedie! channel, a weekly mix of news and humor. At his side, comedians Claudia Tagbo, Ary Abittan and Amelle Chahbi do separate segments. Critics and fans have noted how some segments, such as the opening credits and lip-synched musical numbers, are strikingly similar to those on the U.S. show The Late Late Show with Craig Ferguson on CBS, including the use of completely identical puppets. Craig Ferguson spoke of his astonishment on his 22 November 2010 show, equating the plagiarizing of his show to "taking pants from a hobo". Worldwide Pants Inc., who own the intellectual property of The Late Late Show, have not commented officially, but sources familiar with the matter said that legal action was being contemplated. However, Arthur made an appearance on Ferguson's program on 29 November, arguing that the similarities are an homage rather than a copy, and indicating that no animosity exists between the two hosts; the program ended with the two imitating the final scene of Casablanca and suggesting a new friendship. In June 2011, Craig went to France with Kristen Bell and his robot sidekick, Geoff Peterson, during which he appeared on Arthur's show.

== Theatrical career ==
In September 2005, Arthur began a theatrical career with a first one-man show by Isabelle Nanty entitled Arthur en vrai, in which he wanted to "present himself to the public" and to change his image. During the first tour, this show was played in Europe, North Africa and Quebec and was seen by over 100,000 people in France.

In 2007, Arthur spent a casting to portray Pierre Brochan in Le Dîner de Cons, alongside Dany Boon. Francis Veber, the director, choose him and gave him the role of Pierre Brochan previously played by Claude Brasseur / Michel Roux on stage and Thierry Lhermitte in the film adaptation. Well received by critics, the show was played over 200 times and seen by 150,000 people. The tour ended in March 2008, one month ahead of schedule, due to the success Dany Boon's Bienvenue chez les Ch'tis.

Three years after Arthur en vrai, Arthur began in late 2008 I Show, a new comedy show in which he analyzes various aspects of new technologies. In January 2009, a performance in Ardèche was canceled because of pro-Palestinian demonstrations related to Israel's campaign in Gaza and accusations of financial support to Israel. In February 2009, three new performances were canceled and Arthur took a public stand in an article published in Le Monde in which he complained of being a victim of an anti-Semitic campaign.

== Personal life ==
Arthur is the father of a child named Samuel he had with a former model, Léa Vigny. On 12 February 2004, he married Estelle Lefébure, former wife of David Hallyday, after three years of cohabitation. They divorced in April 2008.

In 2007, Arthur publicly supported Nicolas Sarkozy during the presidential campaign.

== Works ==
=== Bibliography ===
- Antinea et les pirates (with Jean-Marc Lenglen), Michel Lafon, 1994, (ISBN 2840980355)
- Arthur et les pirates, scenario : Arthur / Draws : Olivier Pont, Vents d'Ouest, 1994, (ISBN 2869672799)
- Ta mère !, Flammarion, 1996, (ISBN 2277240753)
- Ta mère 2 la réponse !, Flammarion, 1996, (ISBN 227724225X)
- Et ta sœur, Flammarion, 2000
- Arthur censuré, Michel, 2001, (ISBN 2908652668)
- Ta mère a dix ans, Michel, 2004, (ISBN 2749901480)

=== Theater / one-man show ===
- 2006 : Arthur en vrai, by Isabelle Nanty
- 2007 : Le Dîner de Cons with Dany Boon and by Francis Veber
- 2009 : iShow, second one-man-show

=== TV programs ===
- Vendredi, tout est permis avec Arthur (2011–present) / US version: Riot
- Ce Soir Avec Arthur (2010–present)
- Les Enfants de la télé (1994–present)
- À prendre ou à laisser (2004–2006; 2009)
- Rêve d'un jour / Rêve d'un soir
- Le bêtisier du samedi (1995–1996)
- La Fureur (1996–2000)
- Les enfants du 31 (2006–2007)
- C.I.A.
- 120 minutes de bonheur (2001–2005)
- Personne n'est parfait
- Le zapping du samedi
- Nice People (with Flavie Flament) (2003)

=== Filmography ===
- Les Bidochon, by Serge Korber, 1996
- Paparazzi, by Alain Berbérian, 1998
- Mes amis, by Michel Hazanavicius, 1999

=== Discography ===
- 1992 : Arthur à La Télé, à La Radio (EMI)
- 1996 : Les enfants de la télé (Versailles)
- 1999 : La Fureur - Les hits (EMI)
- 1999 : La Fureur - Les hits de l'été (EMI)
- 1999 : La Fureur - Les slows (EMI)
- 1999 : La Fureur - Les succès de toujours (EMI)
- 2002 : Planetarthur, La compil' (Sony)
- 2003 : Planetarthur, Le retour (Sony)
