= Sanremo Music Festival 2027 =

Italian song contest (77th edition)

Dates and venue
- Semi-final 1: 16 February 2027
- Semi-final 2: 17 February 2027
- Semi-final 3: 18 February 2027
- Semi-final 4: 19 February 2027 (Eurovision selection)
- Final: 20 February 2027
- Venue: Teatro Ariston; Sanremo, Italy

Organisation
- Broadcaster: Radiotelevisione italiana (RAI)
- Artistic director: Stefano De Martino; Fabrizio Ferraguzzo
- Presenters: Stefano De Martino

The Sanremo Music Festival 2027 (Italian: Festival di Sanremo 2027), officially the 77th Italian Song Festival (77º Festival della canzone italiana), is set to be the 77th edition of the annual Sanremo Music Festival, a television song contest held in the Teatro Ariston of Sanremo, organised and broadcast by Radiotelevisione italiana (RAI). It will be held between 16 and 20 February 2027, and will be presented by Stefano De Martino, who will also serve, together with Fabrizio Ferraguzzo, as the artistic director for the competition. The winner of the fourth night will represent Italy in the Eurovision Song Contest 2027. In addition, the overall winner, the designated entrant for Eurovision, and the winner of Sanremo Giovani are expected to go on tour across Europe as part of Italia 2027, a government initiative to promote the Italian music industry.

== Format ==
Teatro Ariston on the second night of the 2026 Festival

The 2027 edition of the Sanremo Music Festival will take place at the Teatro Ariston in Sanremo, Liguria, organised by the Italian public broadcaster RAI. Following a long dispute between RAI and the Sanremo municipality ahead of the preceding edition, an agreement was finally reached to keep the contest in Sanremo until 2029. A special "permanent observatory" was constituted by mutual agreement of both parties, which held its first meeting on 23 April 2026.

On 6 June 2026, RAI announced that the contest would be held from 16 to 20 February 2027.

=== Presenters ===
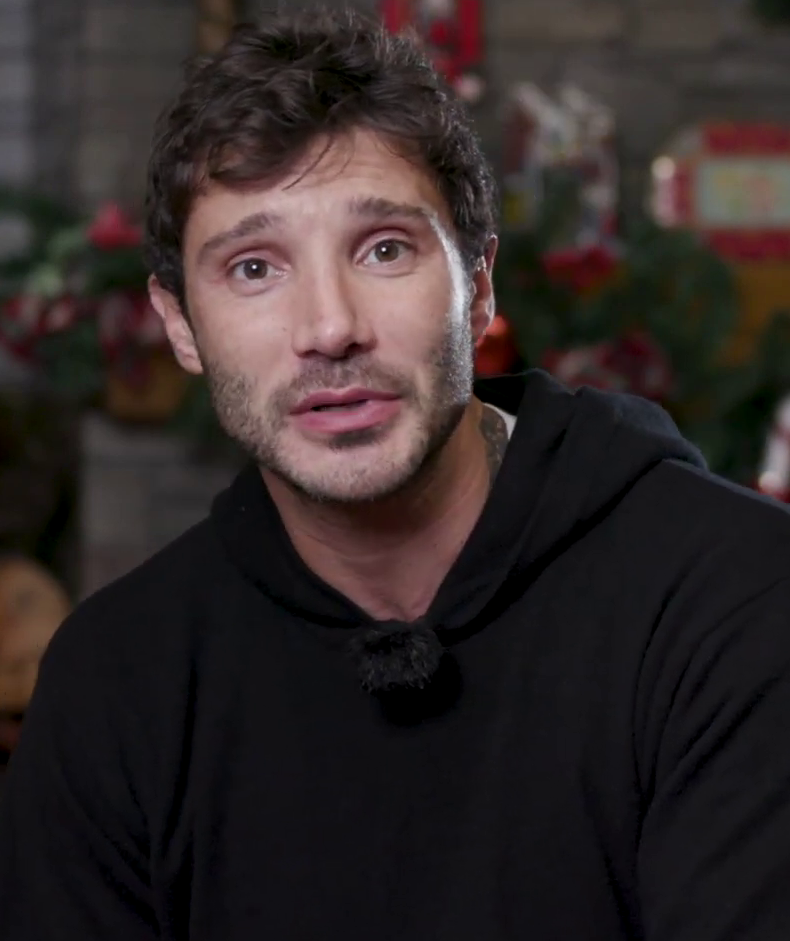
Stefano De Martino, main presenter and artistic director of the 2027 contest

In January 2026, Carlo Conti, Sanremo's host and artistic director from 2025, announced that he would step down from his position after 2026. On 28 February 2026, during the final night of the 2026 edition, he announced Stefano De Martino as the artistic director and main host of the Sanremo Music Festival 2027.

In late October 2026, De Martino announced that the special PrimaFestival opening segment of each show would be hosted by comedy group The Jackal – namely Ciro Priello, Fabio Balsamo, Aurora Leone and Gianluca Fru. A few days later, he announced that ControFestival would replace the traditional DopoFestival segment after each night, which will be hosted by Gialappa's Band.

=== Voting system ===
Voting will occur through the combination of four methods:

- Public televoting, carried out via landline, mobile phone, the contest's official mobile app, and online voting;
- Jury of the Press Room, TV, Radio and Web;
- Jury of the radio;
- International jury.

Their voting will be articulated as follows:

- First night: all the entrants will be judged by the jury of the press room, TV and web (67%) and by televote (33%).
- Second night: all of the entrants will be judged by the jury of the radio (67%) and by televote (33%).
- Third night: the covers will be judged through a split system by means of the televoting (34%) and the two juries (33% each), determining the winner of the night.
- Fourth night: all of the entrants will be judged through a 50/50 split system by means of televoting and the international jury, determining the winner of the night.
- Fifth night: the entrants will be judged through a split system by means of the televote (34%), and the two juries (33% each), to be added up to the results of the first and second nights; ultimately, a final voting round (with only televoting) will be as held among the top five, which will determine the winner.

== Selections ==
=== Sanremo Giovani 2026 ===
The Newcomers' section of the Sanremo Festival was scrapped, with a single entrant to the main competition being determined through the Sanremo Giovani format. The contest will be held across six episodes, with the final at Sanremo Casino airing live on Rai 1 on 11 December 2026, titled Sarà Sanremo and hosted by Stefano De Martino and Mariasole Pollio.

Online submissions for the selection were open from 17 August to 12 October 2026. Among these, 60 acts were selected by a musical committee – composed of professionals Ema Stokholma, Fabio Volo, Noemi, Carlo Pastore Pino Perris and RAI director Claudio Fasulo, and chaired by the artistic director (De Martino) – to take part in an initial audition round in Rome, where 15 of them advanced to a second audition phase in Sanremo on 21 and 22 November, along with 15 entrants from the separate Area Sanremo selection; there, six acts (three from the standard selection and three from Area Sanremo) advanced to the televised stage.

Advanced to the second audition
Advanced to the televised stage

Selected entries
Artist	Song	Songwriter(s)
Abat-Jour	"Acqua di mare"	TBA
Albe	"Vuoi o non vuoi"	TBA
Alessandra Tumolillo	"Giorni normali"	TBA
Ansia	"Bimba Dormi"	TBA
Arianna Rozzo	"Vien'"	TBA
Asja	"Ma non è vero"	TBA
Axel	"La comunicazione"	TBA
Basim	"Distanza"	TBA
Bianca	"Non mi passi più"	TBA
Ceneri	"Chimera"	TBA
Chiara Vinci	"Non è solo un gioco"	TBA
Cialuna	"Tutta l'ansia che ho"	TBA
Clae	"CiaCiaCiaCiao"	TBA
Daniel Cosmic	"Grandine"	TBA
Davide De Luca	"Hai ragione tu"	TBA
Dubrazil	"Por favor"	TBA
Emma Muscat	"Romanticamente"	TBA
Enne	"Nilo"	TBA
Florinda	"Senza 'e te"	TBA
Frambo	"Non disturbare"	TBA
Frasa	"Yesssman"	TBA
Futura	"Castelli di rabbia"	TBA
Gallas	"Fermo"	TBA
Giorgia Ari	"Nord America"	TBA
Hermes	"Touch Me"	TBA
Ilaria Kappler	"Il filo bianco"	TBA
Iora	"Niente di importante"	TBA
Jacopo Sol	"Un'eccezione"	TBA
Jones Junior	"Il telefono"	TBA
Kawakami	"Diamante"	TBA
Khamilla	"Tormento"	TBA
La Base	"Non ti chiederò"	TBA
Layana	"Lettera d'addio"	TBA
Lea Gavino	"L'ennesima canzone"	TBA
Les Votives	"Non importa"	TBA
LioN	"Poesie vuote"	TBA
Lor3n	"Non è una canzone d'amore"	TBA
Maddalena	"Fa moda"	TBA
Malemà	"Solo insieme a te"	TBA
MilleAlice	"Aria"	TBA
Neartica	"Foto mossa"	TBA
Nodialpettine	"Mi sento ridicolo"	TBA
Occhi	"La guerra dei bottoni"	TBA
OrioN	"Frastuono"	TBA
Petit	"Sei tu"	TBA
Plasma	"Energia meccanica"	TBA
Poli Ok	"Questo non è amore"	TBA
Quarto	"Che figata"	TBA
Rob	"Non imparo mai"	TBA
Santachiara	"Ossitocina"	TBA
Santamarea	"Tutto questo mare dentro"	TBA
Santi	"L'America ha fallito"	TBA
Sarai	"I bot"	TBA
Selina	"Maledetta icona"	TBA
Selma	"Lo sognerò"	TBA
Seltsam	"Che guaio l'amore"	TBA
Shizarina	"Bugie"	TBA
Tiposchegge	"Adessormai"	TBA
Tommaso Vulpio	"Parole perse"	TBA
Ube	"Se verrà la pioggia"	TBA

==== Area Sanremo 2026 ====
The rules of the Area Sanremo selection, organised by the Municipality of Sanremo alongside the Sanremo Symphonic Orchestra Foundation, were released in early August 2026, with the opening of an online application platform lasting between 17 August and 15 October 2026. The submitting acts were auditioned by the same musical committee of the standard Sanremo Giovani selection between 6 and 12 November 2026, with the qualifiers from this phase attending a second auditon round on 14 and 15 November at the Sanremo Palafiori, where 15 winners were proclaimed; these proceeded to the final audition, in which the three Sanremo Giovani participants were selected.

Area Sanremo finalists (winning entries are marked in bold; selected Sanremo entrants are underlined)
- Ales
- Alessia Bisignano
- Alessia Gatto
- Anima
- Atra
- Bebe
- **Bluesy**
- Bracco
- **Bush**
- Cainero
- Carillon
- Chanel Dilecta
- Chiara Massimo
- **Clarice**
- Cola Siel
- Crisante
- Cristina
- Crytical
- Daniele White
- Daros
- Devila&Alife
- Djomi
- **Equarantacinque**
- **EroCaddeo**
- Er Pablo
- Evan
- **Frero**
- **Gabriele Esposito**
- Gabriele Spira
- Gard
- Giada
- Giovami
- Giuls
- Greta Grida
- Jacopo
- Kasy
- **Kimono**
- La Femelle
- **Lens**
- Lorenzo Girotti
- Ludovica
- **Lysa**
- Matsby
- Mickael Damelio
- The Moonquakes
- **Nashley**
- **Nausica e l'Inganno**
- Novablue
- **Nox**
- Pablo Murphy
- Paily
- **Primogenito**
- PuramenteSamuel
- Sara Naldi
- Sofia
- **Sofia Sole**
- Stefano Maria Pardo
- Tribo
- Valentina
- Volpi

== Competing entries ==
The Newcomers' section of the contest was merged into the traditional Big Artists section, which sees the participation of 24 artists. 23 were selected by the artistic director among established artists; the remaining spot was reserved for the winner of Sanremo Giovani 2026. The 24 participants will be revealed on 11 December 2026.

== Shows ==
=== First night ===
Half of the competing artists will perform their competing songs.

=== Second night ===
The remaining artists will perform their competing songs.

=== Third night ===
The artists will perform an Italian or international song from the past, duetting with one or more guest performers.

=== Fourth night ===
All artists will stage a Eurovision Song Contest–style performance of their competing songs. The winner of the night will be selected to represent Italy in the Eurovision Song Contest 2027.

=== Fifth night ===
All artists will perform their competing songs.
