= Valeria Graci =

Italian comedian (born 1980)

- Born: 22 August 1980 (age 46); Milan, Lombardy, Italy
- Occupations: Comedian, actress, TV host, radio presenter
- Years active: 2001–present

Valeria Graci (born 22 August 1980) is an Italian comedian, actress, television host, and radio presenter.

== Career ==
Graci gained recognition in the 2000s as a member of the comedy duo Katia & Valeria on the television show Zelig. The duo split in 2012.

She made her feature film debut in 2011 by appearing in Baciato dalla fortuna by Paolo Costella, Ex 2: Still Friends? by Carlo Vanzina, and Vacanze di Natale a Cortina by Neri Parenti.

Between 2013 and 2014, Graci rose to prominence on Made in Sud (Rai 2) with her parody of Peppa Pig, which led to her joining Striscia la notizia as a correspondent from 2014 to 2022. From 2015, she hosted Paperissima Sprint, worked on Colorado, and appeared in various RAI programmes. Between 2017 and 2018, she hosted Quelle brave ragazze on Rai 1.

Since 2018, she has also worked as a radio host on RTL 102.5 and Radio Zeta. In 2019, she served as a juror at the Zecchino d'Oro. In 2022, Graci co-hosted selected episodes of Striscia la notizia.

Between 2024 and 2025, Graci reunited on stage with Katia Follesa and appeared on LOL – Chi ride è fuori on Prime Video.

== Filmography ==
Film
Year	Title	Role	Notes
2011	Baciato dalla fortuna	Teresa	Feature film debut
2011	Ex 2: Still Friends?	Sandra's friend	
2011	Vacanze di Natale a Cortina	Brunella Proietti	
2014	Sapore di te	Michela	
2014	What's Your Sign?	Lawyer Comodi	
2016	A Fistful of Grapes	Manager	
2022	Din Don: Il paese dei balocchi	Susy	Television film

Television
Year	Title	Role	Notes
2008	Don Luca c'è	Laura Mazzetti	Main role
2010	Fratelli Benvenuti	Maria	
