= L'arbitro =

L'arbitro may refer to:

- L'arbitro (1974 film), a film starring Joan Collins
- L'arbitro (2013 film), a film starring Stefano Accorsi
