= Federico Basso =

Italian comedian and television writer (born 1975)

- Basso in 2026
- Born: 1 January 1975 (age 51); Turin, Italy
- Occupations: Comedian, television writer
- Years active: 2003–present

Federico Basso (born 1 January 1975) is an Italian comedian and television writer. He became known through his appearances on the Italian comedy television shows Zelig and Zelig Off, both as guest performer and presenter. He has also worked as a television writer on programmes including Belli dentro and Crozza Italia. In 2025, he won the fifth season of the comedy show LOL - Chi ride è fuori.

In November 2024, Basso was announced as one of five Italian personalities serving as ambassadors for the promotion of the 2026 Winter Olympic and Paralympic Games. On 11 January 2026, he also participated as a torchbearer in the Olympic torch relay in Turin.

== Filmography ==
Film
| Year | Title | Role | Notes |
|---|---|---|---|
| 2014 | People Who Are Well | Scaramelli | Film debut |
| 2026 | Toy Story 5 | Smarty Pants | Italian voice dub |

Television
| Year | Title | Role | Notes |
|---|---|---|---|
| 2011 | Casa Pierpiero | Giangiacomo | Main role |

== Television ==
- Zelig Off (2004–2005)
- Zelig (2006, 2011–2013, 2021, 2026)
- Geppi Hour (2007)
- Zelig Off (2007–2011) – co-host
- The Band (2022)
- Comedy Match (2024–2026) – contestant
- Techetechete' (2024)
- LOL - Chi ride è fuori (2025) – winner
- Only Fun – Comico Show (2025–2026)
- DopoFestival (2026) – regular guest
- La notte dei fiori (2026)
- Comedy Central Presents: Federico Basso (2026)
