= Alessandro Cattelan: One Simple Question =

Italian documentary series

- Alessandro Cattelan - Una semplice domanda
- Genre: Documentary; Comedy
- Created by: Alessandro Cattelan
- Written by: Carlo Colloricchio; Federico Giunta; Luca Restivo
- Composer: Street Clerks
- Country of origin: Italy
- Original language: Italian
- No. of seasons: 1
- No. of episodes: 6

Production
- Executive producer: Maria Gammella
- Running time: 28–33 minutes
- Production companies: Fremantle; Netflix

Original release
- Network: Netflix
- Release: 18 March 2022

Alessandro Cattelan: One Simple Question (Italian: Alessandro Cattelan - Una semplice domanda) is a 2022 Italian documentary series created by television host and personality Alessandro Cattelan. It was released internationally on Netflix on 18 March 2022.

== Episodes ==
No.	Title	Original release date
1	"How Do You Find Happiness?"	18 March 2022
Alessandro meets Italian footballer Roberto Baggio and psychotherapist Giorgio Piccinino.
2	"Does Having Faith Make Us Happy?"	18 March 2022
Alessandro meets Italian director Paolo Sorrentino.
3	"Is There Happiness in Pain?"	18 March 2022
Alessandro meets Italian footballer Gianluca Vialli.
4	"Does Love Make Us Happy?"	18 March 2022
Alessandro meets Italian comedian Geppi Cucciari, classicist Eva Cantarella and porn actors Steve and Danika Mori.
5	"What Else Could I Want to Be Happy?"	18 March 2022
Alessandro meets Italian comedian Francesco Mandelli and television executive Roberto Giovalli.
6	"Can Happiness Be a Choice?"	18 March 2022
Alessandro meets Egyptian engineer Mo Gawdat, Italian musician Elio and the judges ByeAlex, Puskás Péter, Gáspár Laci and Csobot Adél from X Factor Hungary.

== See also ==
- List of Italian television series
