= Katia & Valeria =

Italian comedy duo

Katia Follesa (born 12 January 1976) and Valeria Graci (born 22 August 1980) are an Italian former comedy duo who worked on stage, films and television as Katia & Valeria.

The couple formed in 2001 in a drama school, the Laboratorio Scaldasole in Milan. The duo had its breakout in 2004, when they became regular in the variety shows Colorado Café (broadcast on Italia 1), Sformat (Rai 2) and Comedy Lab (MTV). In 2006 they entered in the cast on the Canale 5 show Zelig, and in 2007 they co-hosted the practical joke reality television series Scherzi a parte. In 2011, the duo starred in the comedy film Vacanze di Natale a Cortina by Neri Parenti.

In 2012, the couple split in order to pursue solo projects.
