= Brenda Lodigiani =

Italian actress, comedian and television presenter (born 1987)

- Lodigiani in 2024
- Born: 30 December 1987 (age 38); Sant'Angelo Lodigiano, Lombardy, Italy
- Occupations: Actress, comedian, television presenter
- Years active: 2005–present
- Partner: Federico Teoldi
- Children: 2

Brenda Lodigiani (born 30 December 1987) is an Italian actress, comedian and television presenter. She is known for her appearances on Italian television, including the comedy show Gialappa Show, where she performs celebrity impersonations and original characters.

== Life and career ==
Lodigiani was born in Sant'Angelo Lodigiano, Italy. She began her television career as a dancer before presenting children's programmes on Disney Channel from 2005 to 2008. She later appeared on programmes including Scorie, Quelli che il calcio and Glob, gaining recognition for her celebrity impersonations.

In 2014, she made her film debut in A Boyfriend for My Wife. She appeared in Si muore tutti democristiani (2018), Mollo tutto e apro un chiringuito (2021) and Ricomincio da taaac (2024), portraying the Imbruttita, a character embodying the stereotype of the ambitious, fast-paced Milanese professional associated with the comedy project Il Milanese Imbruttito.

In 2023, Lodigiani joined the cast of Gialappa Show, where her impersonations of singers and television personalities became a recurring feature. She also participated in the third season of LOL - Chi ride è fuori and the fourth season of Celebrity Hunted on Prime Video.

In 2025, she co-hosted the radio programme Non è un paese per giovani on Rai Radio 2 during the Sanremo Music Festival; later that year, she became the host of Bake Off Italia on Real Time. In February 2026, she took part in the opening ceremony of the 2026 Winter Olympics, performing a comedy sketch based on Italian gestures.

== Filmography ==
Film
Year	Title	Role	Notes
2014	A Boyfriend for My Wife	Patrizia	Film debut
2015	Italiano medio	Journalist	
2016	Riso, amore e fantasia		
2018	Si muore tutti democristiani	Chiara	
2021	Mollo tutto e apro un chiringuito	Imbruttita	
2024	Ricomincio da taac	Imbruttita	
2024	Io e te dobbiamo parlare	Matilde Gaudino	

Television
Year	Title	Role	Notes
2009	La villa Di Lato	Riccarda Di Lato	Web series
2015	Fuoriclasse	Eva Mair	8 episodes
2016	Mariottide	Chanel	Episode "Chanel"
2017	Camera Café	Martina Paroli	
2020	Don Matteo	Elisabetta	Episode "Non uccidere"
2023	Sono Lillo	Herself	Episode 3
2025	Love Bugs	Brenda	Main role

== Television ==
- Disney 365 (2005–2008)
- Scorie (2008–2009)
- Total Request Live (2010) – co-host
- Quelli che il calcio (2010–2021)
- Xtra Factor (2011–2012) – co-host
- Alessandro Borghese: Celebrity Chef (2022) – contestant
- LOL - Chi ride è fuori (2023) – contestant
- Gialappa Show (2023–present)
- Celebrity Hunted (2024)
- Bake Off Italia (2025–present) – host
- Red Carpet Survival (2025)
- LOL - Halloween Special (2026) – winner
