= Cattelan =

Cattelan is an Italian surname derived from Venetian catełan 'Catalan'. Notable people with the surname include:

- Alessandro Cattelan (born 1980), Italian television personality
- Maurizio Cattelan (born 1960), Italian artist
