= Katia Follesa =

Italian comedian (born 1976)

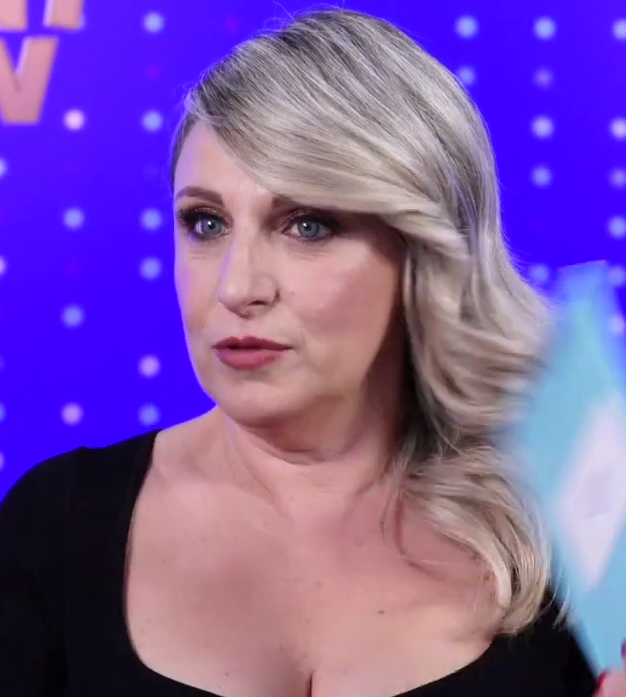
- Follesa in 2024
- Born: 12 January 1976 (age 50); Giussano, Lombardy, Italy
- Occupations: Actress; comedian; television presenter
- Years active: 2001–present

Katiuscia Follesa, simply known as Katia Follesa (born 12 January 1976), is an Italian radio and television presenter, actress, and comedian.

== Career ==
She gained recognition in the 2000s as a member alongside Valeria Graci of the comedy duo Katia & Valeria on the television show Zelig. The duo split in 2012.

Throughout her career, Follesa has acted and performed as a comedian in numerous TV programs and sketch shows, including Buona la prima!, Quelli che il calcio, Michelle Impossibile, and LOL - Chi ride è fuori. Since the 2010s, she has hosted TV shows on Rai and Mediaset, becoming a familiar face on Discovery Real Time and Nove networks, hosting Junior Bake Off Italia, Cake Star - Pasticcerie in sfida, and other comedy programs.

Alongside her television career, Follesa has written and performed in her own theatrical tours in Italy, collaborating with her ex-husband Angelo Pisani. She has also hosted radio programs and acted in films and TV series, including Social Family in 2020.

In 2021, she was awarded the prize for Best Female TV Personality at the 78th Venice International Film Festival. Follesa co-hosted the third night of the Sanremo Music Festival 2025.

== Filmography ==
Film
Year	Title	Role	Notes
2011	Vacanze di Natale a Cortina	Wanda	
2012	Benvenuti al Nord	Taxi Driver	Cameo role
2023	Un oggi alla volta	Alessandra	
2025	Toy Story 5	Lilypad (voice)	Italian dub

Television
Year	Title	Role	Notes
2014	Uno di troppo	Katia	Miniseries
2020–2021	Social Family	Katia	Main role
2024	Sono Lillo	Luna	Main role (season 2)
2025	Sicily Express	Claudia	Main role
2026	Super Market	Cristina	Main role

== Television ==
Year	Title	Role	Notes
2004	MTV Comedy Lab	Herself / Various	Sketch comedy series (season 1)
2004	Colorado Café Live	Herself / Various	Sketch comedy series (season 2)
2005–2011	Zelig	Herself / Various	Sketch comedy series (season 9-14)
2007	Scherzi a parte	Herself / Co-host	Candid camera prank show (season 10)
2008–2009, 2017	Buona la prima!	Katia	Recurring role (season 2-4)
2010–2011	Transformat	Herself / Co-host	Game show (season 1)
2011	A&F: Ale & Franz Show	Herself / Co-host	Sketch comedy series
2012	Mamma mia che domenica	Herself / Co-host	Talk show
2012	Cristina Parodi Live!	Herself	Talk show
2013	Cuochi e fiamme	Herself / Judge	Cooking competition series (season 4)
2014	Quanto manca	Herself / Host	Sketch comedy series
2014–2015	Quelli che... il calcio	Herself / Performer	Variety show (season 22)
2015–2016	Verissimo	Herself / Interviewer	Talk show (season 20)
2016	Bring the Noise	Herself / Contestant	Game show
2016–2017	The Loud House	Rita Loud	Italian voice (season 1)
2017–2018	Big Show	Herself / Co-host	Variety show (season 1-2)
2017–2019	Junior Bake Off Italia	Herself / Host	Junior cooking competition (season 3-5)
2018–2022	Cake Star	Herself / Host	Bakery competition series
2019	Take Me Out	Herself / Host	Dating reality show (season 9)
2021	LOL - Chi ride è fuori	Herself / Contestant	Reality show (season 1)
2021	D'amore & d'accordo	Herself / Host	Reality show
2022	Celebrity Hunted: Caccia all'uomo	Herself / Contestant	Reality show (season 3)
2022–2024	Michelle Impossible	Herself / Co-host	Variety show
2024–present	Comedy Match	Herself / Host	Variety show
2025	Sanremo Music Festival 2025	Herself / Co-host	Annual music festival
2025	Alessandro Borghese: 4 ristoranti	Guest judge	Season 11, episode 1
2026	Only Fun – Comico Show	Herself / Various	Sketch comedy series (season 5)
2026	Il Volo – Uno per tutti	Herself / Host	Special
