= Marco Maccarini =

Italian television personality (born 1976)

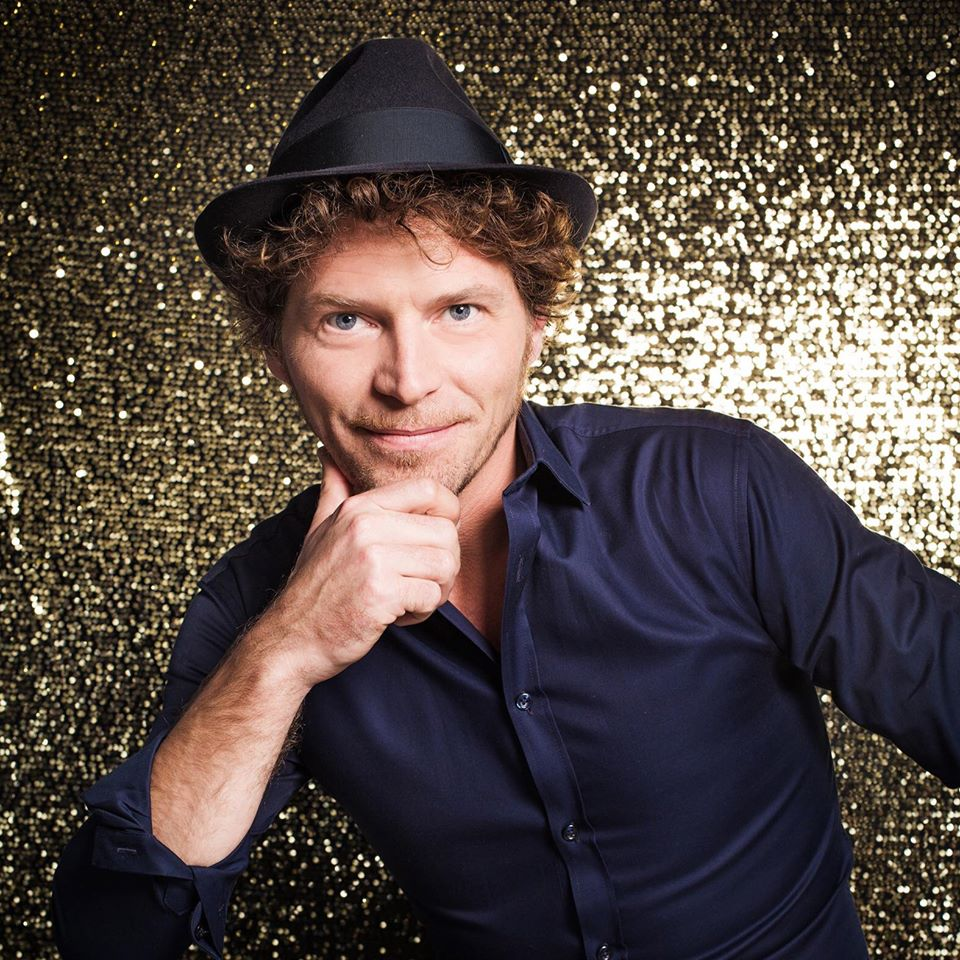
Marco Maccarini

Marco Maccarini (born 22 July 1976 in Turin) is an Italian television personality known for presenting TRL Italy, the Italian version of Total Request Live broadcast by MTV Italia, and Festivalbar, broadcast by Mediaset’s Italia 1.
