= Generation 56K =

2021 Italian romantic comedy television miniseries

- Italian poster
- Italian: Generazione 56K
- Genre: Romantic comedy
- Created by: Francesco Capaldo; Kim Gualino
- Written by: Francesco Capaldo; Kim Gualino; Davide Orsini; Costanza Durante; Laura Grimaldi
- Directed by: Francesco Capaldo; Alessio Maria Federici
- Starring: Angelo Spagnoletti; Alfredo Cerrone; Cristina Cappelli; Azzurra Iacone; Gianluca Fru; Gennaro Filippone; Fabio Balsamo; Egidio Mercurio; Claudia Tranchese; Sveva Simeone
- Country of origin: Italy
- Original language: Italian
- No. of episodes: 8

Production
- Running time: 26–33 minutes
- Production company: Cattleya

Original release
- Network: Netflix
- Release: 1 July 2021

Generation 56K (Italian: Generazione 56K) is a 2021 Italian romantic comedy television miniseries. It was released by Netflix on 1 July 2021.

== Plot ==
Told between the 1990s and the present day, Daniel and Matilda navigate their relationship over two decades. The title refers to the 56k modem that emerged the late 1990s.

== Cast ==
=== Main ===
- Angelo Spagnoletti as Daniel Mottola
  - Alfredo Cerrone as young Daniel
- Cristina Cappelli as Matilda Pastore
  - Azzurra Iacone as young Matilda
- Gianluca Fru as Luca Battaglia
  - Gennaro Filippone as young Luca
- Fabio Balsamo as Sandro Farina
  - Egidio Mercurio as young Sandro
- Claudia Tranchese as Inés
  - Sveva Simeone as young Inés

=== Recurring ===
- Sebastiano Kiniger as Enea
- Biagio Forestieri as Bruno Mottola
- Bianca Maria D'Amato as Rosaria
- Luciano Scarpa as Fausto Pastore
- Manuela Ventura as Marina
- Massimiliano Rossi as Aurelio Visdomini
- Ernesto Mahieux as Prof. Diego Ponzo

== Episodes ==
No.	Title	Duration	Original release date
1	"The Date" (L'appuntamento)	33 min	1 July 2021
2	"The Woodworm" (Il tarlo)	28 min	1 July 2021
3	"Research and Development" (Ricerca e sviluppo)	31 min	1 July 2021
4	"Fidelity" (Fedeltà)	29 min	1 July 2021
5	"The Gift" (Il regalo)	30 min	1 July 2021
6	"Come mai"	26 min	1 July 2021
7	"Message in a Bottle"	30 min	1 July 2021
8	"The Elevator" (L'ascensore)	30 min	1 July 2021

== Production ==
The series was filmed in Naples and Procida.
