= Paolo Cevoli =

Italian comedian and actor (born 1958)

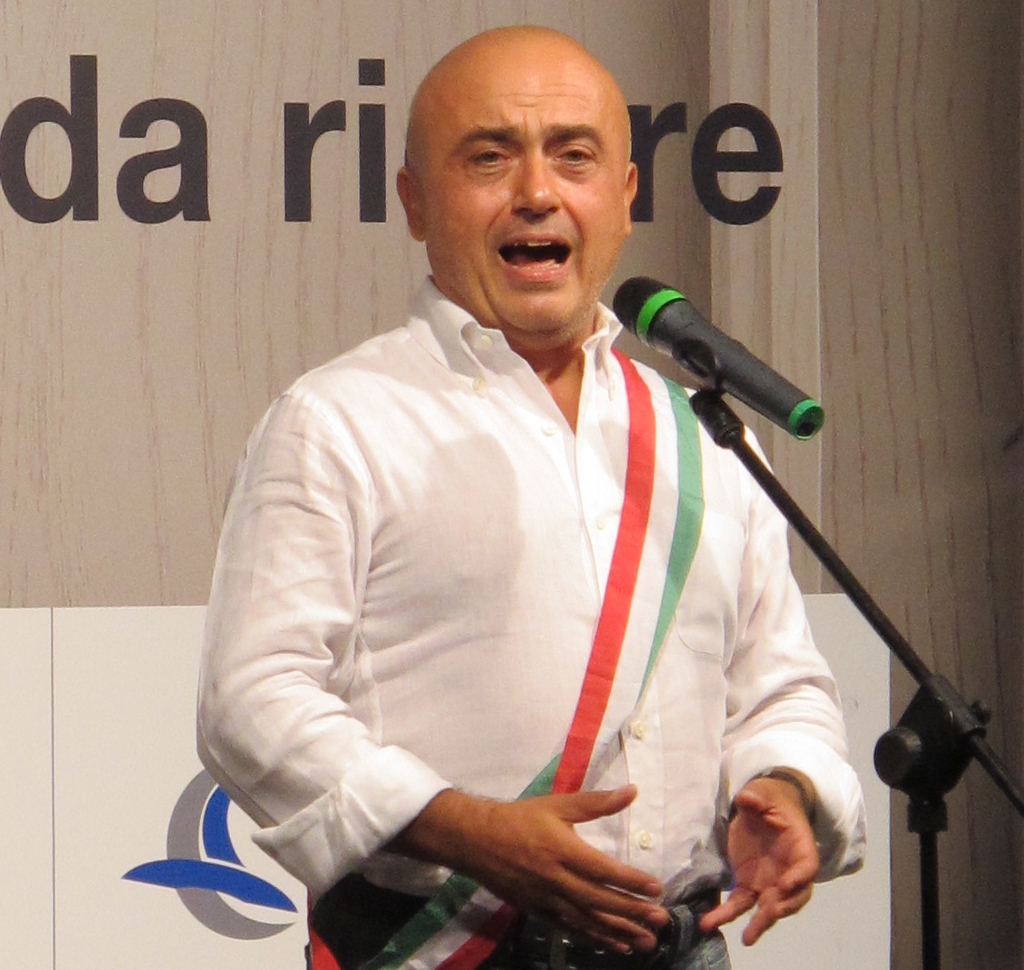
- Cevoli as Palmiro Cangini in 2012
- Born: 29 June 1958 (age 68); Rimini, Italy
- Occupations: Comedian, actor, director
- Years active: 1990–present

Paolo Cevoli (born 29 June 1958) is an Italian comedian, actor and director.

== Life and career ==
Born in Rimini, Cevoli grew up in Riccione and graduated in law from the University of Bologna. He initially worked in the hospitality industry before pursuing comedy.

Cevoli gained recognition through the comedy competition La Zanzara d'Oro in 1990 and appearances on Maurizio Costanzo Show. He became widely known through the Italian television programme Zelig, particularly for his character Palmiro Cangini, a fictional municipal assessor from Romagna. Other characters include Teddi Casadey, Lothar and Olimpio Pagliarani.

In 2015, he made his feature film directorial debut with Soldato semplice, a comedy set during World War I, in which he also starred as the lead actor and served as screenwriter and producer.

In 2023, he appeared in LOL - Chi ride è fuori, and in 2024 he competed in Pechino Express alongside his wife, fashion designer Elisabetta Garuffi.

== Filmography ==
Film
Year	Title	Role	Notes
2007	2061: An Exceptional Year	Moby Dick	Film debut
2015	Soldato semplice	Gino Montanari	Also director, screenwriter and producer
2024	50 km all'ora	Priest	

== Television ==
- Maurizio Costanzo Show (1990–1991)
- Zelig (2001–present)
- LOL - Chi ride è fuori (2023)
- Pechino Express (2024)
- Only Fun – Comico Show (2025)
