= Wannabe Widowed =

- Film poster
- Italian: Aspirante vedovo
- Directed by: Massimo Venier
- Written by: Massimo Venier; Ugo Chiti; Michele Pellegrini; Piero Guerrera
- Produced by: Paolo Guerra
- Starring: Luciana Littizzetto; Fabio De Luigi
- Cinematography: Vittorio Omodei Zorini
- Music by: Stefano Caprioli
- Distributed by: 01 Distribution
- Release date: 10 October 2013 (Italy)
- Running time: 85 min
- Country: Italy
- Language: Italian

Wannabe Widowed (Italian: Aspirante vedovo) is a 2013 black comedy film directed by Massimo Venier.

It is a remake of 1959 Dino Risi's film Il vedovo.

== Cast ==
- Luciana Littizzetto as Susanna Almiraghi
- Fabio De Luigi as Alberto Nardi
- Alessandro Besentini as Stucchi
- Francesco Brandi as Giancarlo
- Roberto Citran as Augusto Fenoglio
- Bebo Storti as Pier
- Ninni Bruschetta as Marcello Perlasca
- Luciano Scarpa as Roberto
- Clizia Fornasier as Giada
- Fulvio Falzarano as Giada's father
- Alessandra Raichi as Giada's mother
- Andrea Bruschi as the businessman
- Stefano Chiodaroli as Arturo
