= Gino & Michele =

Pair of authors

Luigi Vignali (born 7 July 1949) and Michele Mozzati (born 15 May 1950), best known as Gino & Michele, are writers, television and theater authors, and editors.

Born in Milan, they met in the mid-sixties. Between 1969 and 1971 they formed the cabaret ensemble "I Bachi da seta", then, in the seventies, the couple contributed to the formation and growth of Radio Popolare, in which they hosted numerous satirical programs. Later they started collaborating with the magazine Linus and publishing several novels and collections of short stories. Starting from the variety show Drive In, they also have a prolific career as television authors. In 1985 the couple achieved a significant stage success as authors of the stage play Comedians, directed by Gabriele Salvatores; from then they signed several stage works, particularly for comedian Paolo Rossi. In 1986 they also became owners and co-directors (together with Giancarlo Bozzo) of the comedy club Zelig.

In 1990 the couple started the series of humorous books Anche le formiche nel loro piccolo s'incazzano that were all bestsellers.

In 2002, they founded the publishing house Kowalski, that was later acquired by Feltrinelli.

== See also ==
- Zelig (TV programme)
