= LOL - Chi ride è fuori =

- Genre: Comedy reality
- Created by: Hitoshi Matsumoto
- Directed by: Alessio Pollacci
- Presented by: Fedez; Mara Maionchi; Frank Matano
- Country of origin: Italy
- Original language: Italian
- No. of series: 6
- No. of episodes: 36

Production
- Executive producer: Chiara Simeoni
- Editors: Davide Neglia; Andrea Doniselli; Roberto Baratti; Stefano Balzarelli; Matteo De Grandis
- Running time: 30 minutes
- Production company: Endemol Shine Italy

Original release
- Network: Amazon Prime Video
- Release: 26 February 2021 – present

Related
- Documental

LOL - Chi ride è fuori is an Italian comedy reality television show based on the format of Japanese comedian Hitoshi Matsumoto's Documental. It is hosted by Fedez, Mara Maionchi (Season 1) and Frank Matano (Season 2–3), The first four episodes were published on 1 April 2021, while the remaining two were made available on April 8.

On April 23, 2021, the game show was renewed for a second edition. The first 4 episodes of the second edition were released on February 24, 2022, while the remaining 2 on March 3, 2022.

== Rules ==
The rules are the same as other editions: 10 comedians are locked in a house-theater for six consecutive hours. The goal of each player is to make others laugh by any means: jokes, gags, props (present in a special "locker room" or brought from outside). In case of laughter, smiles and grimaces, a player is initially cautioned with a yellow card and, subsequently, sent off with a red card and then eliminated from the game. Furthermore, the players are obligated to actively participate in the game, under penalty of a warning or elimination.

The conductors (here defined as host and co-host), positioned in the so-called control room, observe and comment on what is happening in the room through a camera system and, using a console, give the competitors precise commands and / or suggest to them inputs for comic interventions. The last player remaining wins. The final prize is 100,000 euros, which the winner will donate entirely to charity.

== First edition (2021) ==
=== Competitors ===
- Angelo Pintus
- Caterina Guzzanti
- Ciro Priello
- Elio
- Frank Matano
- Gianluca Fru
- Katia Follesa
- Lillo
- Luca Ravenna
- Michela Giraud

=== Elimination table ===
W The competitor wins the game
S The competitor has not undergone any action and is still safe
A The competitor is warned but continues the game
E The competitor is expelled and exits the game
E The competitor is warned and expelled in the same episode

Position	Competitor	Episode					
Position	Competitor	1	2	3	4	5	6
1	Ciro Priello	S	A	A	A	A	W
2	Katia Follesa	S	S	S	A	A	E
3	Caterina Guzzanti	S	S	S	S	S	E
4	Elio	S	S	S	A	A	E
5	Frank Matano	S	S	S	S	E	
6	Lillo	S	S	A	A	E	
7	Michela Giraud	S	S	S	A	E	
8	Angelo Pintus	S	S	A	E		
9	Luca Ravenna	S	A	E			
10	Gianluca Fru	A	E				

The winner, Ciro Priello, donates his 100,000 euros prize to ActionAid.

== Second edition (2022) ==
=== Competitors ===
- Alice Mangione
- Corrado Guzzanti
- Diana Del Bufalo
- Gianmarco Pozzoli
- Maccio Capatonda
- Mago Forest
- Maria Di Biase
- Max Angioni
- Tess Masazza
- Virginia Raffaele

=== Elimination table ===
W The competitor wins the game
S The competitor has not undergone any action and is still safe
A The competitor is warned but continues the game
E The competitor is expelled and exits the game

Position	Competitor	Episode					
Position	Competitor	1	2	3	4	5	6
1	Maccio Capatonda	S	S	S	S	A	W
2	Virginia Raffaele	S	S	A	A	A	E
3	Corrado Guzzanti	S	A	A	A	A	E
4	Maria Di Base	S	S	A	A	A	E
5	Gianmarco Pozzoli	S	S	A	A	A	E
6	Mago Forest	S	S	A	A	E	
7	Diana Del Bufalo	S	S	S	A	E	
8	Tess Masazza	A	A	A	A	E	
9	Max Angioni	S	S	A	A	E	
10	Alice Mangione	S	S	A	E		

The winner, Maccio Capatonda, donates his 100,000 euros prize to WWF.

== Christmas Special (2022) ==
=== Competitors ===
- Frank Matano
- Lillo
- Mago Forest
- Mara Maionchi
- Maria Di Biase
- Michela Giraud

=== Elimination table ===
W The competitor wins the game
S The competitor has not undergone any action and is still safe
A The competitor is warned but continues the game
E The competitor is expelled and exits the game

Position	Competitor	Episode							
Position	Competitor	1							
1	Mago Forest	S			A				W
2	Frank Matano	S			A				E
3	Maria Di Biase	S			A			E	
4	Lillo	S			A		E		
5	Michela Giraud	S			A	E			
6	Mara Maionchi	S	A	E					

The winner, Mago Forest, donates his 100,000 euros prize to non-profit associations CasAmica and A Casa Lontani da Casa.

== Third edition (2023) ==
=== Competitors ===
- Brenda Lodigiani
- Cristiano Caccamo
- Fabio Balsamo
- Herbert Ballerina
- Luca Bizzarri
- Marina Massironi
- Marta Filippi
- Nino Frassica
- Paolo Cevoli
- Paolo Kessisoglu

=== Elimination table ===
W The competitor wins the game
S The competitor has not undergone any action and is still safe
A The competitor is warned but continues the game
E The competitor is expelled and exits the game

Position	Competitor	Episode					
Position	Competitor	1	2	3	4	5	6
1	Fabio Balsamo	S	S	A	A	A	W
1	Luca Bizzarri	S	S	S	A	A	W
3	Herbert Ballerina	S	S	S	S	A	E
4	Paolo Kessisoglu	A	A	A	A	A	E
5	Brenda Lodigiani	S	S	A	A	A	E
6	Marina Massironi	S	S	S	A	A	E
7	Marta Filippi	S	S	A	A	A	E
8	Cristiano Caccamo	S	S	A	A	E	
9	Nino Frassica	S	A	A	A	E	
10	Paolo Cevoli	S	A	E			

Fabio Balsamo and Luca Bizzarri, at the end of the six hours of play, agreed on a draw and donated the 100,000 euros prize to the non-profit associations AS.IT.O.I. and ABEO.

== Fourth edition (2024) ==
=== Competitors ===
- Angela Finocchiaro
- Aurora Leone
- Claudio Santamaria
- Diego Abatantuono
- Edoardo Ferrario
- Giorgio Panariello
- Loris Fabiani
- Lucia Ocone
- Maurizio Lastrico
- Rocco Tanica

In addition, at the beginning of the game Fedez is added as an extra competitor, with the disadvantage of direct elimination at the first laugh.

=== Elimination table ===
W The competitor wins the game
S The competitor has not undergone any action and is still safe
A The competitor is warned but continues the game
E The competitor is expelled and exits the game
E The competitor is warned and expelled in the same episode

Position	Competitor	Episode					
Position	Competitor	1	2	3	4	5	6
1	Giorgio Panariello	S	S	S	A	A	W
2	Edoardo Ferrario	S	S	A	A	A	E
3	Aurora Leone	S	A	A	A	A	E
4	Rocco Tanica	S	S	S	A	A	E
5	Lucia Ocone	S	S	S	A	A	E
6	Claudio Santamaria	S	A	A	A	E	
7	Loris Fabiani	S	S	S	A	E	
8	Angela Finocchiaro	S	S	A	A	E	
9	Maurizio Lastrico	S	A	A	A	E	
10	Diego Abatantuono	S	S	E			
11	Fedez	S	E				

The winner, Giorgio Panariello, shares his 100,000 euros prize with runner up Edoardo Ferrario, and donates it to non-profit associations Lega per la difesa del cane and Helpcode.

== Fifth edition (2025) ==
=== Competitors ===
- Federico Basso
- Enrico Brignano
- Flora Canto
- Tommy Cassi
- Alessandro Ciacci
- Raul Cremona
- Geppi Cucciari
- Valeria Graci
- Andrea Pisani
- Marta Zoboli

== Sixth edition (2026) ==
=== Competitors ===
- Carlo Amleto
- Valentina Barbieri
- Giovanni Esposito
- Barbara Foria
- Sergio Friscia
- Francesco Mandelli
- Paola Minaccioni
- Scintilla
- UfoZero2
- Yoko Yamada

=== Elimination table ===
W The competitor wins the game
S The competitor is safe
A The competitor is warned
E The competitor is eliminated

Position	Competitor	1	2	3	4	5	6
1	Scintilla	S	S	S	A	S	W
2	Carlo Amleto	S	S	S	S	A	E
3	Valentina Barbieri	S	S	S	S	S	E
4	Yoko Yamada	S	S	S	S	S	E
5	UfoZero2	S	S	S	A	S	E
6	Paola Minaccioni	S	A	S	S	E	
7	Barbara Foria	S	A	S	S	E	
8	Francesco Mandelli	S	S	A	S	E	
9	Sergio Friscia	A	S	E			
10	Giovanni Esposito	S	S	E			

== Halloween Special (2026) ==
=== Competitors ===
- Katia Follesa
- Herbert Ballerina
- Brenda Lodigiani
- Andrea Pisani
- Lucia Ocone
- Maccio Capatonda

== Promotion ==
The official trailer was released on March 19, 2021, while a one-hour aftershow was released online on April 26, attended by 10 comedians from the first edition.

== Reviews ==
In an interview with Variety magazine, Nicole Morganti, head of Italian productions of the Amazon Prime Video platform, stated that the game show was the most viewed title ever on the platform.
