= Un tranquillo funerale di famiglia =

2026 comedy film directed by Massimiliano Bruno

- Directed by: Massimiliano Bruno
- Screenplay by: Massimiliano Bruno; Edoardo Maria Falcone
- Based on: Death at a Funeral by Dean Craig
- Starring: Claudia Pandolfi; Pietro Sermonti; Stefano Fresi; Beatrice Arnera; Dino Abbrescia; Giulia Vecchio; Edoardo Ferrario; Carlo Amleto; Alessandro Mauthe; Giovanni Iovino; Carlo Buccirosso; Diego Abatantuono; Stefania Sandrelli
- Cinematography: Marco Bassano
- Edited by: Luciana Pandolfelli
- Music by: Roberto Procaccini
- Production companies: No Name Entertainment; Rai Cinema; Sony Pictures
- Distributed by: 01 Distribution
- Release date: 29 October 2026 (Italy)
- Running time: 98 minutes
- Country: Italy
- Language: Italian

Un tranquillo funerale di famiglia is a 2026 Italian black comedy film directed by Massimiliano Bruno and written by Bruno and Edoardo Maria Falcone. It is a remake of the 2007 British film Death at a Funeral, directed by Frank Oz and written by Dean Craig.

== Cast ==
- Claudia Pandolfi as Daria
- Pietro Sermonti as Riccardo
- Stefano Fresi as Osvaldo
- Beatrice Arnera as Stefania
- Dino Abbrescia as Giovanni
- Giulia Vecchio as Giulia
- Edoardo Ferrario as Marco
- Carlo Amleto as Don Mauro
- Alessandro Mauthe as Matteo
- Giovanni Iovino as Piero
- Carlo Buccirosso as Vittorio
- Diego Abatantuono as Alfredo
- Stefania Sandrelli as Sandra

== Release ==
The film premiered out of competition at the 21st Rome Film Festival. It was released theatrically in Italy on 29 October 2026.
