= Pesci piccoli =

2023 Italian television series

- Genre: Comedy
- Created by: Francesco Ebbasta; Alessandro Grespan
- Written by: Francesco Ebbasta; Alessandro Grespan; Luca Vecchi; Stefano Di Santi
- Directed by: Francesco Ebbasta
- Starring: Fabio Balsamo; Gianluca Fru; Aurora Leone; Ciro Priello; Martina Tinnirello
- Country of origin: Italy
- Original language: Italian
- No. of series: 2
- No. of episodes: 14

Production
- Executive producers: Simone Russo; Gennaro Fasolino
- Producers: Gianluca Cozzolino; Simone Russo; Alfredo Felaco; Francesco Ebbasta; Carlo Stella; Maria Carolina Terzi; Lorenza Stella
- Production companies: The Jackal; Mad Entertainment

Original release
- Network: Amazon Prime Video
- Release: 8 June 2023 – present

Pesci piccoli (transl. "Small Fishes") is an Italian television series created by The Jackal. The first season was released on Amazon Prime Video on 8 June 2023, followed by a second season on 13 June 2025.

== Premise ==
In the era of TikTok and social media highlight reels, the Tree of Us agency appointed Greta, a manager transferred from its Milan office, to the Naples branch. She works with a team—including Ciro, Fabio, Gianluca, and Aurora—focused on collaborations with local brands and emerging influencers. The team’s activities encompass professional projects as well as interpersonal interactions and shared routines.

== Cast ==
=== Main ===
- Fabio Balsamo as Fabio
- Gianluca Fru as Gianluca
- Aurora Leone as Aurora
- Ciro Priello as Ciro
- Martina Tinnirello as Greta Benni

=== Recurring ===
- Giovanni Anzaldo as Alessio (season 1–2)
- Veronica Mazza as Roberta "Mastiff" (season 1–2)
- Dino Porzio as Marione (season 1–2)
- Mario Zinno as Alfredo (season 1–2)
- Gianni Spezzano as Raffaele (season 1–2)
- Sara Penelope as Sara (season 1–2)
- Alessia Santalucia as Alice (season 1–2)
- Francesca Romana Bergamo as Marika (season 1–2)
- Sergio Del Prete as Giuliano (season 1–2)
- Federica Pagliaroli as Giulia (season 2)
- Elena Sophia Senise as Maya (season 2)
- Luca Tanganelli as Andrea (season 2)

=== Guest ===
- Achille Lauro as himself (season 1)
- Gabriele Vagnato as Gabriele Bagnato (season 1)
- Valentina Barbieri as Valentina Barbari (season 1)
- Herbert Ballerina as Herbert De Filippis (season 1)
- Giovanni Muciaccia as Giovanni (season 1)
- Flavio Pellino as Fulvio (season 1)
- Anna Ferroaioli Ravel as Camilla (season 1)
- Angelo Spagnoletti as Filippo (season 1)
- Marina Zanchi as grandma Lia (season 1)
- Amanda Campana as Eloise (season 1)
- Beppe Vessicchio as Peppino (season 2)
- Andrea Moccia as himself (season 2)
- Stefano Nazzi as himself (season 2)
- Stefano Rapone as Raponi (season 2)
- Daniele Tinti as Tinto the puppet (season 2)
- Giovanni Esposito as Mimmo De Miccio (season 2)
- Yoko Yamada as the Shevibes client (season 2)
- Danilo Bertazzi as himself/Tonio (season 2)
- Roberta Lista as Michelle (season 2)
- Maurizio Merluzzo as Mike Merluzzo (season 2)
- Angelo Maggi as Amedeo (season 2)
- Gabriele Di Bello as Nino (season 2)
- Alessandro Borghese as himself (season 2)
- Chiara Mercurio as Amanda (season 2)
