= Luca Ravenna =

Italian comedian and television writer

Luca Filippo Ravenna (born 27 September 1987) is an Italian comedian and television writer.

== Early life ==
Born in Milan, Ravenna trained at the Experimental Cinematography Center in Rome.

== Career ==
He collaborated with the Roman comedy group The Pills in comic sketches published on YouTube and on television. He was co-author of their first feature film The Pills – Sempre meglio che lavorare. His career changed when he attended a show by comedian Edoardo Ferrario. In 2014 he decided to devote himself to stand-up comic performances. In 2018 he toured his first comedy show "In the Ghetto" with dates in major Italian and European cities.

Parallel to his activity as a comedian, he often works writing teleplays for programs such as Quelli che... il calcio and Che fuori tempo che fa hosted by Fabio Fazio. In 2015 he was the protagonist and author of the web series No Problem, produced for Repubblica.it. He participated in the television programs Natural Born Comedians and Stand Up Comedy, both on Comedy Central.

In 2020 his first show Luca Ravenna Live was released online, produced by Dazzle in collaboration with Aguilar and Indigo Film. He performed on the new live comedy show Rodrigo Live. Together with Edoardo Ferrario he leads the podcast Cachemire – Un podcast morbidissimo. Topics vary from episode to episode. The first guest on the podcast was Walter Veltroni during episode 8.

In March 2021 he published the improvised comedy show Luca Ravenna: Improv Special vol. 1 via The Comedy Club platform. In April 2021 he participated as a contestant in the Amazon Prime Video comedy show LOL – Chi ride è fuori.

== Comedy shows ==
- ''In the Ghetto'' (2018)
- ''Luca Ravenna Live@'' (2020)
- ''Rodrigo Live'' (2020)
- ''Luca Ravenna: Improv Special vol.1'' (2021)

== Television ==
- Quelli che... il calcio (Rai 2, 2016–2017)
- The Pills: non ce la faremo mai (Italia 1, 2015)
- Natural Born Comedians (Comedy Central, 2015–2016)
- Stand Up Comedy (Comedy Central, 2017–2018)
- Zio Gianni (Rai 2, 2015–2016)
- Che fuori tempo che fa (Rai 1, 2017)
- LOL – Chi ride è fuori (Amazon Prime Video, 2021)

== Web ==
- Non c'è problema (Repubblica.it, 2015)
- Cachemire – Un podcast morbidissimo (YouTube, 2020–2023)
- LOL – Chi ride è fuori (Amazon Prime Video, 2021)

== Filmography ==
=== As a writer ===
- The Pills – Sempre meglio che lavorare (2016)

=== As an actor ===
- Appunti di un venditore di donne (2021)
- Il Baracchino (2025; voice role)
