= The Pills – Sempre meglio che lavorare =

2016 Italian comedy film

- Film poster
- Directed by: Luca Vecchi
- Written by: Luca Ravenna; Matteo Corradini; Luigi Di Capua; Luca Vecchi
- Produced by: Pietro Valsecchi; Matteo Rovere
- Starring: Matteo Corradini; Luigi Di Capua; Luca Vecchi
- Cinematography: Vito Frangione
- Music by: Federico Bisozzi
- Production companies: Taodue; Groenlandia; Eat Movie
- Distributed by: Medusa Film
- Release date: 21 January 2016 (Italy)
- Running time: 90 minutes
- Country: Italy
- Language: Italian

The Pills – Sempre meglio che lavorare (lit. 'The Pills - Always better than working') is a 2016 Italian comedy film by The Pills.

== Cast ==
- Matteo Corradini as Matteo
- Luigi Di Capua as Luigi
- Luca Vecchi as Luca
- Giancarlo Esposito as Bangla Boss
- Margherita Vicario as Giulia
- Francesca Reggiani as Matteo's mother
- Giulio Corradini as Matteo's father
- Mattia Coluccia as Mattia
- Betani Mapunzo as Betani
- Luca Di Capua as Luca
- Angela Favella as Angela
- Andrea Colicchia as Maurizio
