= Total Request Live (Italian TV program) =

- Created by: Massimo Lopresti
- Starring: Alessandro Arcodia, Brenda Lodigiani, Andrea Cadioli, Wintana Rezene
- Country of origin: Italy
- No. of episodes: 1,985

Production
- Running time: 60 minutes

Original release
- Network: MTV Italy
- Release: November 2, 1999 – September 24, 2010

Total Request Live is the Italian version of the American television program of the same name that originated in 1999. Originally broadcast weekdays at 2.00 p.m., its time slot was changed as it ran into its second season. It was broadcast at 3.00 p.m. starting in 2002.

The main presenters, during the ten seasons, were Alessandro Cattelan, Giorgia Surina, Marco Maccarini, Carolina Di Domenico, and Federico Russo. As from June 2, 2008 the show is hosted by Elena Santarelli and Carlo Pastore, who presented another music programme of MTV, Your Noise. During her episode of May 15, 2009, Elena Santarelli, because of her maternity, left the show. Elisabetta Canalis came replacing her.

In 2010 the show had been completely renovated and have changed his name in TRL On the Road, so the show wasn't hosted from a stage, but from a truck to make viewers more involved.

Despite the show being cancelled in 2010, the TRL Awards were celebrated until 2012.

== Presenters ==
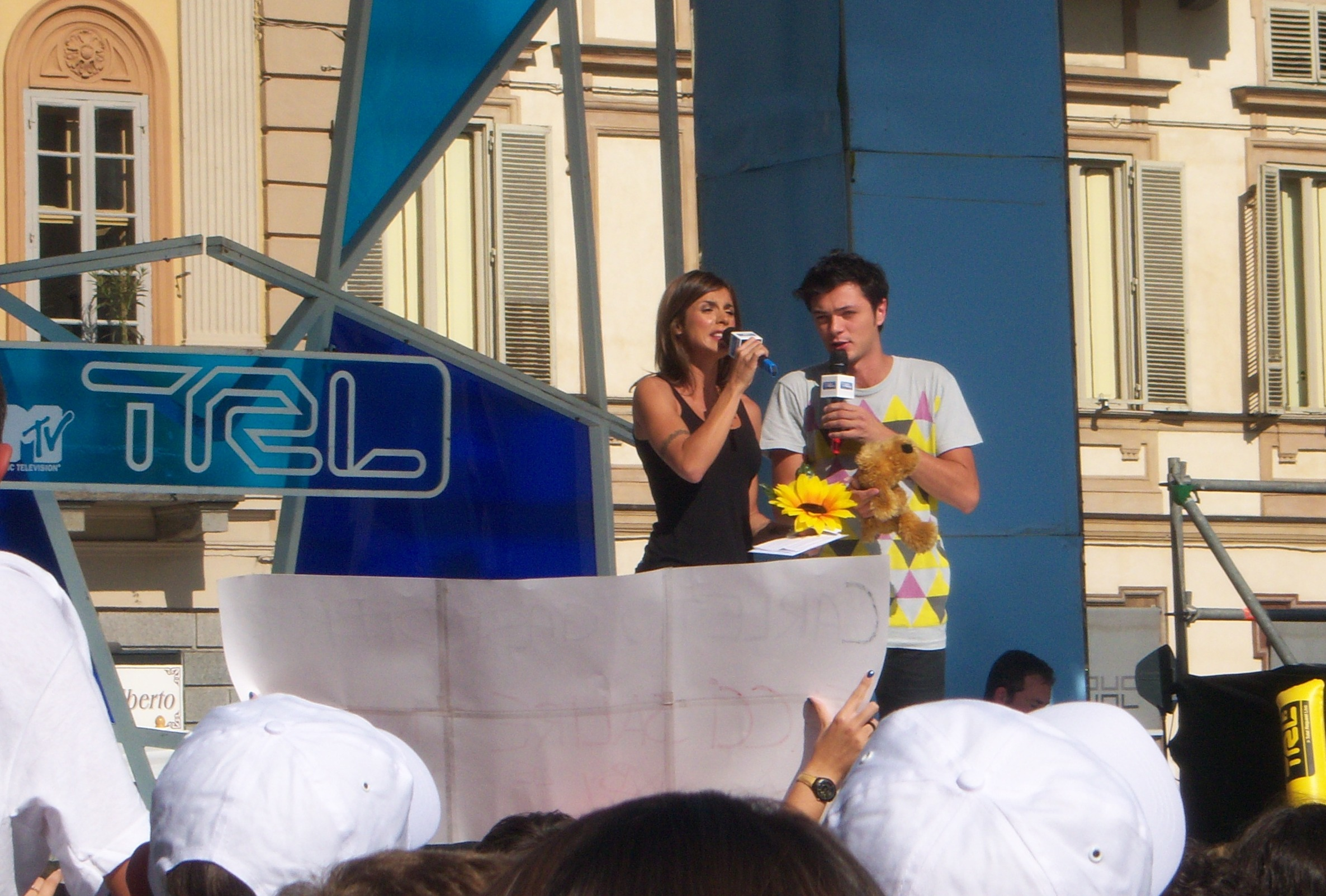
2009's TRL presenters: Carlo Pastore and Elisabetta Canalis.

- Marco Maccarini and Giorgia Surina (1999–2004)
- Marco Maccarini, Giorgia Surina, Carolina Di Domenico and Federico Russo (2004)
- Carolina Di Domenico and Federico Russo (2004–2005)
- Alessandro Cattelan and Giorgia Surina (2005–2006)
- Alessandro Cattelan (2006–2007)
- Alessandro Cattelan and Victoria Cabello (2006)
- Alessandro Cattelan and in different weeks Silvia Hseih, Michela Coppa, Giorgia Palmas and Melissa Satta (2007)
- Alessandro Cattelan and Elena Santarelli (2007–2008)
- Carlo Pastore and Elena Santarelli (2008–2009)
- Carlo Pastore and Elisabetta Canalis (2009)
- Alessandro Arcodia, Brenda Lodigiani, Andrea Cadioli and Wintana Rezene (2010)

== TRL On Tour ==
During summertime, the show goes on tour to several Italian cities, such as Rome, Naples, Florence, Turin, Padua, and Bari.

=== Pre-TRL On tour era ===
==== 2000 ====
- Stockholm: November, 2000 for the MTV Europe Music Awards 2000

==== 2002 ====
- Bologna: April 15–19, 2002
- Rome: July 1 – August 9, 2002 and again September 16–29, 2002

==== 2003 ====
- Rome: May 5 – July 11, 2003 and again December 17–25, 2003

==== 2004 ====
- Venice: February 14–24, 2004
- Naples: May 1–23, 2004 (Dante Square)
- Rome: June 15 – 30 July 2004 and again November 10–19, 2004 for the MTV Europe Music Awards 2004

==== 2005 ====
- Milan: March 20 – April 1, 2005 (Milano Centrale railway station)
- Naples: April 19 – May 13, 2005 (Dante Square)
- Genoa: June 2–22, 2005 (Porto Antico)
- Rome: July 7–29, 2005 (Tevere Village)
- Turin: September 21 – October 7, 2005 (Carlo Alberto Square)
- Milan: October 10, 2005 (Arco della Pace)
- Lisbon: October 24 - November 4, 2005 for the MTV Europe Music Awards 2005

=== TRL On Tour era ===
==== 2006 ====
- Naples: April 12–22, 2006 (Dante Square)
- Rome: April 24, 2006 (Piazza del Popolo)
- Turin: April 27 – May 6, 2006 (Carignano Square)
- Genoa: May 11–20, 2006 (Porto Antico)
- Padua: May 25 – June 3, 2006 (Prato della Valle)
- Trieste: June 8–17, 2006 (Molo Audace)
- Rimini: June 22 – July 1, 2006 (Boscovich Square)
- Bari: July 6–15, 2006 (Ferrarese Square)
- Syracuse: July 22 – August 5, 2006 (Lido Sayonara/Fontane Bianche)
- Rome: October 13–21, 2006 (Augusto Imperatore Square)

==== 2007 ====
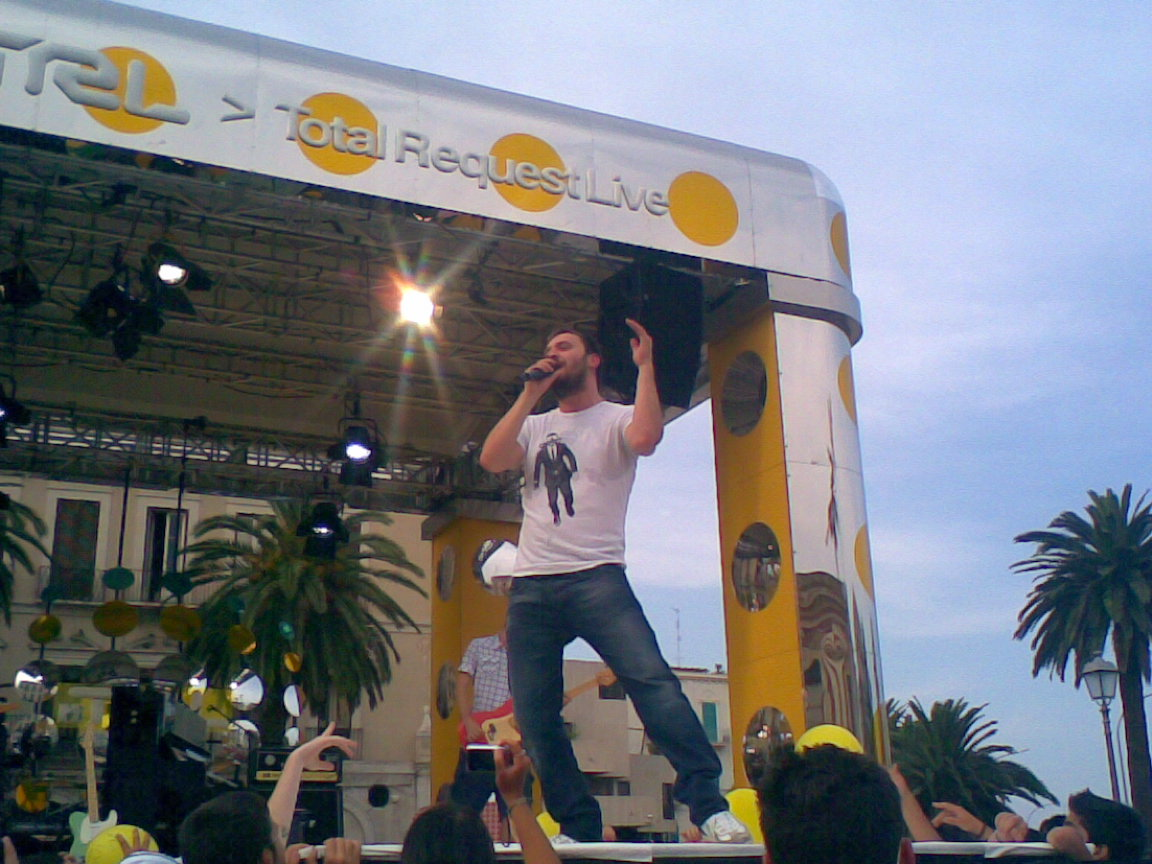
Cesare Cremonini performing on TRL stage.

- Padua: April 30 – May 4, 2007 (Prato della Valle)
- Turin: May 8–18, 2007 (Vittorio Veneto Square)
- Bologna: May 22 – June 1, 2007 (XX Settembre Square)
- Florence: June 5–15, 2007 (Michelangelo Square)
- Naples: June 19–29, 2007 (Castel Nuovo)
- Bari: July 3–13, 2007 (Ferrarese Square)
- Palermo: July 18–28, 2007 (Mondello Beach)
- Rome: September 5–14, 2007 (San Giovanni Square)
- Corleone: December 20–22, 2007 (Falcone and Borsellino Square)

==== 2008 ====
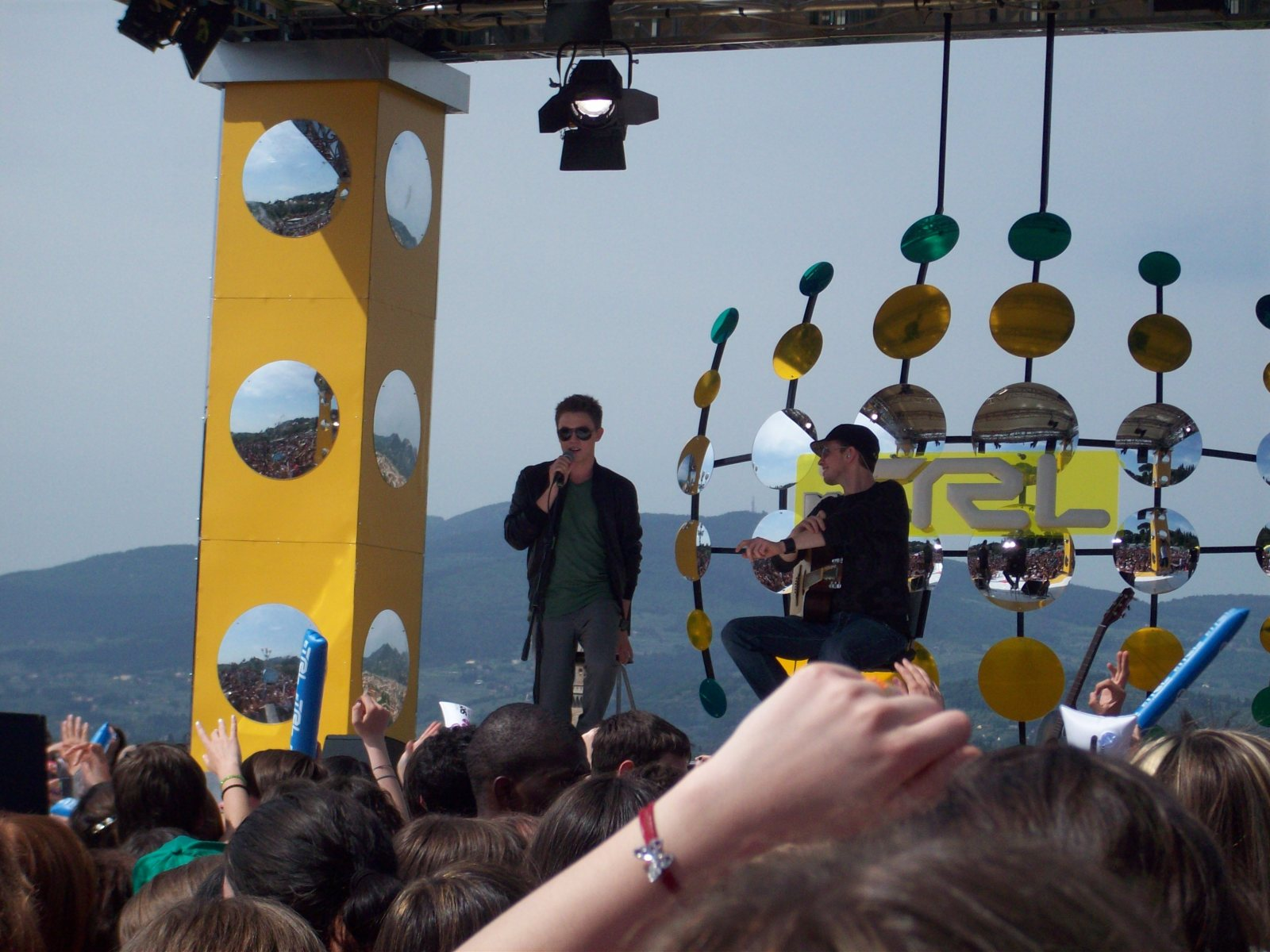
Jesse McCartney performs on TRL Stage.

- Florence: May 26 – June 5, 2008 (Michelangelo Square)
- Mantua: June 9–14, 2008 (Erbe Square)
- Bari: June 17–27, 2008 (Ferrarese Square)
- Pescara: July 1–11, 2008 (Primo Maggio Square)
- Reggio Calabria: July 16 – June 26, 2008 (Square)
- Genoa: September 6–13, 2008 (Caricamento Square)
- New York City: December 22, 2008 - January 5, 2009 from the T.R.L. US studios in Time Square

==== 2009 ====
- Palermo: May 25 - June 4, 2009 (Foro Italico)
- Rimini: June 9–19, 2009 (Fellini Square)
- Pescara: June 30, 2009 - July 10, 2009 (Viale della Riviera)
- Rome: July 15, 2009 - July 26, 2009 (Foro Italico)
- Genoa: September 7, 2009 - September 14, 2009 (Nave Italia)
- Turin: September 27, 2009 - October 1, 2009 (Carlo Alberto Square)
- Rome: November 13, 2009 - November 25, 2009 (Ferruccio Parri Square)

== TRL On the Road ==
In 2010 the TRL On Tour was canceled and replaced with TRL On the Road.

=== 2010 ===
- Genova: May 3–7, 2010 (Porto Antico)
- Trieste: May 24–28, 2010 (Unita d'Italia Square)
- Riccione: May 31 - June 4, 2010 (Roma Square)
- Pescara: June 7–11, 2010 (Salotto Square)
- Bari: June 14–18, 2010 (Diaz Square)
- Bibbona: June 28 - July 2, 2010 (Forte Square)
- Latina: July 5–9, 2010 (Piazza del Popolo)
- Catania: July 12–16, 2010 (Viale Africa)
- Milan: September 13–24, 2010 (Duca d'Aosta Square)

== TRL Extra Live ==
On 2007, during the second edition of TRL On Tour, it created a spin-off of TRL called TRL Extra Live in which some Italian singers were performing a show for the length of about 1 hour, preceded by some Italian emerging bands selected from the show.

=== 2007 ===
- Naples: June 29, 2007
- Bari: July 12, 2007
- Palermo: July 20, 2007

=== 2010 ===
- Milan: September 17, 2010

== Albums ==
- 2003: TRL Compilation: Volume 1
- 2008: TRL Compilation: Volume 2
- 2009: TRL Story
- 2010: TRL On the Road Compilation

== See also ==
- TRL Awards (Italy)
