= Sicily Express =

2025 Italian television miniseries

- Sicilia Express
- Genre: Comedy
- Created by: Ficarra e Picone
- Written by: Ficarra e Picone; Fabrizio Cestaro; Nicola Guaglianone; Fabrizio Testini
- Directed by: Ficarra e Picone
- Starring: Salvatore Ficarra; Valentino Picone; Katia Follesa; Barbara Tabita; Max Tortora
- Composers: Paolo Buonvino; Vittorio Giannelli
- Country of origin: Italy
- Original language: Italian
- No. of series: 1
- No. of episodes: 5

Production
- Producers: Attilio De Razza; Nicola Picone
- Production company: Tramp Limited

Original release
- Network: Netflix
- Release: 5 December 2025

Sicily Express is an Italian television miniseries created by Ficarra e Picone. It was internationally released on Netflix on 5 December 2025.

The series, produced by Tramp Limited, combines fantasy elements with a Christmas setting, offering an ironic and critical look at Southern Italian society.

== Plot ==
Salvo and Valentino are two Sicilian nurses working in a Milan clinic, commuting between Sicily and Milan on low-cost flights. Their medical director, a Calabrian who pretends to be Milanese, constantly hinders their attempts to return home. One night, thanks to a wish made by Valentino's daughter, they discover a magical dumpster that teleports them from Piazza del Duomo in Milan to their hometown in Sicily, and back again.

== Cast ==
=== Main ===
- Salvatore Ficarra as Salvo
- Valentino Picone as Valentino
- Katia Follesa as Claudia
- Barbara Tabita as Maria Teresa
- Max Tortora as the prime minister of Italy

=== Recurring ===
- Sergio Vastano as Sergio Perrone, the medical director
- Enrico Bertolino as Enrico, the Milanese doctor
- Adelaide Massari as Aurora, Valentino's daughter
- Angelo Tosto as Mr. Giacalone, a Sicilian patient in Milan
- Giorgio Tirabassi as Alfredo, a police detective
- Angelo Pisani as Andrea, a Milanese nurse
- Alessia Spinelli as Luisa, a Milanese nurse
- Alessandro Idonea as Giulio Giacalone, a police officer and Giacalone's son
- Gianni Federico as Ferdinando, a Sicilian man working in Milan
- Giovanna Criscuolo as Giovanna, a Sicilian woman working in Milan
- Vincenzo Ficarra as Mario, a Sicilian boy working in Milan
- Miriam Galanti as Miriam, the gate attendant
- Luigi Maria Rausa as Uzeda, the prime minister's secretary
- Barbara Gallo as Amanda, Valentino's mother-in-law
- Mimmo Mignemi as Carmelo, Valentino's father-in-law
- Marco Basile as Guglielmo, Claudia's ex-boyfriend
- Anna Melato as Mrs. Elvira, the landlady
- Pino Calabrese as the Head of Forensics

=== Guest ===
- Gioele Dix as the man walking his dog in Milan
- Jerry Calà as the minister of the Interior of Italy
- Enrico Mentana as himself
