= Luca Vecchi (actor) =

Italian actor, director and writer (born 1985)

- Born: 1985 (age 40–41); Rome, Italy
- Occupations: Actor; director; screenwriter
- Years active: 2011–present

Luca Vecchi (born 1985) is an Italian actor, director, and screenwriter, best known as a member of the comedy group The Pills.

== Life and career ==
In 2011, Vecchi co-founded The Pills with Matteo Corradini and Luigi Di Capua, gaining popularity online through their comedy videos. He made his first television appearance on DeeJay TV with Late Night with The Pills in 2012. Vecchi has written and directed films, including The Pills – Sempre meglio che lavorare (2016), and has appeared in several films, such as I Can Quit Whenever I Want (2014), Modalità aereo (2019), and Dolceroma (2019). He also collaborated on the screenplays of the TV series Zio Gianni and the comedy Poveri ma ricchissimi (2017).

In 2020, Vecchi starred in the comedy Nel bagno delle donne, and in 2022 he published his first book, Tu per me sei morto with Rizzoli.

== Filmography ==
Actor filmography
Year	Title	Role	Notes
2014	I Can Quit Whenever I Want	Recovering drug addict	
2014	Vittima degli eventi	Groucho	Short film
2014	Reveries of a Solitary Stroller	Emo boy	
2016	The Pills – Sempre meglio che lavorare	Luca	Also director and writer
2017	I'm (Endless Like the Space)	Mad Hatter	
2019	Modalità aereo	Lorenzo Moretti	
2019	Dolceroma	The director	
2020	Divorzio a Las Vegas	Tullio	
2020	Nel bagno delle donne	Giacomo Roversi	
2021	Olivia	Francobestia	
2022	Improvvisamente Natale	Paolo	
2023	Il migliore dei mondi	Gianni	
2024	30 anni (di meno)	Giuffrida	
2024	Come far litigare mamma e papà	Oreste	
2026	Amici comuni	Claudio	

Filmography (as director and screenwriter)
Year	Title	Role	Notes
2013	Andarevia	Writer	
2014	Vittima degli eventi	Writer	Short film
2014–2016	Zio Gianni	Writer	TV series
2016	The Pills – Sempre meglio che lavorare	Director and writer	
2017	Hooked	Director and writer	Miniseries
2017	A Christmas Carol	Director	Short film
2017–2020	Sbratz	Director	Miniseries
2017	Poveri ma ricchissimi	Writer	
2020	Non può	Director	Short film
2021	Back to the Techno	Director	Short film
2022	Bang Bang Baby	Writer	TV series
2023–2025	Pesci piccoli	Writer	TV series
2023	Holy Shoes	Writer	
