= Addio fottuti musi verdi =

2017 Italian science fiction comedy film

- Theatrical release poster
- Directed by: Francesco Ebbasta
- Written by: Francesco Ebbasta; Valerio Cilio; Marco Sani; Fausto Rio
- Produced by: Riccardo Tozzi; Marco Chimenz; Giovanni Stabilini; Simone Russo; Francesca Longardi
- Starring: Ciro Priello; Fabio Balsamo; Beatrice Arnera
- Cinematography: Francesco Di Giacomo
- Edited by: Francesco Ebbasta; Nicola Verre
- Music by: Michele Braga
- Production companies: Cattleya; The Jackal; Rai Cinema
- Release date: 9 November 2017 (Italy)
- Running time: 93 minutes
- Country: Italy
- Language: Italian
- Box office: $822,764

Addio fottuti musi verdi (transl. Goodbye, you bloody green-faces) is a 2017 Italian science fiction comedy film by the group The Jackal.

The film premiered at the Rome Film Festival on 1 November 2017, and was released in Italy on 9 November.

== Plot ==
In Naples, thirty-year-old Ciro is a graphic designer who, to make ends meet, works at a Chinese fry shop. After various attempts to find a job, he decides to enter a competition suggested by his nerd friend Fabio, sending his resume "into space" as part of a contest organized for the release of a new film of the action sci-fi franchise AFMV, starring Lieutenant Ruzzo. His long-time friend Matilda, whom Ciro secretly loves, proposes that he comes with her to London, but he can't be convinced. However, his resume is actually read by aliens, and their leader, Brandon, invites him for a job interview. Ciro is hired and tasked with designing the alien company's logo. Ciro unexpectedly finds himself working for an alien company based on competence and meritocracy, where he finally receives the recognition he deserves.

One day, Brendon shows Ciro how his logo will be applied to a gigantic cannon, and Ciro learns that Earth will be destroyed, as God, the owner of the alien corporation, has sent them to settle the debt accumulated by the humans from using solar energy. Since the amount is too large to be paid off, Earth is condemned to destruction. Ciro tries to dissuade Brandon but is unsuccessful. However, he manages to steal a dematerializer that instantly teleports to the dump planet Dimension X and returns to Earth to find a way to save humanity. He decides to confront Brandon personally and prepares an assault on the spaceship with toy guns, aided by Fabio and Matilda. Ciro confesses his love to Matilda, and they kiss. One of the guns is equipped with the dematerializer, which Fabio accidentally uses against an illegal parking attendant.

On the spaceship, the trio tries to locate Brandon to prevent him from blowing up Earth. They come across the singer Gigi D'Alessio, who has been held captive and turned into a robot. It is revealed that he is an alien who, arriving on Earth years ago, discovered music and developed a love for humanity. Matilda sings D'Alessio's song "Un nuovo bacio", which restores D'Alessio's consciousness. As he decides to join them, he is shot and killed by Janine, an armored robot who was once Ciro's secretary but is now programmed to eliminate them. The trio confronts Janine and ultimately Ciro manages to deactivate her. They locate Brandon, but the alien tries to bribe them with the offer of indefinite contracts for all three at the company. The trio refuses, choosing instead the chance to be heroes. Brandon activates the cannon and reveals that the amount humanity was supposed to pay, in Italian currency, amounts to 37 euros. The three search their pockets and gather the sum, saving Earth just moments before its destruction.

A few months later, Ciro works alongside Fabio as a videomaker for weddings, birthdays, and other events. His relationship with Matilda lasted only a few days. Matilda now works at Brandon's company, where she has married an alien. Other unemployed young graduates have also been hired by the company. In the final scene, the Lord of Dimension X encounters the illegal parking attendant sent by Fabio and realizes that he is an Earthling. Convinced that Earthlings are using his planet as a dump, he declares the start of the invasion of Earth.

== Cast ==
- Ciro Priello as Ciro
- Fabio Balsamo as Fabio
- Beatrice Arnera as Matilda
- Roberto Zibetti as Brandon
- Ruzzo Simone as Lieutenant Ruzzo
- Fortunato Cerlino as Pietro Felacone
- Salvatore Esposito as Genny Felacone
- Gigi D'Alessio as himself
- Rosalia Porcaro as Ciro's mother
- Marco Mario de Notaris as the illegal parking attendant
- Gabriele Patruno as Janine
- Alfredo Felco as Alfredo
- Mariana Rodríguez as Tanya
- Haruhiko Yamanouchi as Yang
- Fortunato Marco Iannaccone as Frank
- Rosaria D'Urso as Felacone's secretary
- Roberta Riccio as Proxy
- Annalisa De Martino and Gianluca Colucci as the pilots
