= Petit (singer) =

Italian singer-songwriter (born 2005)

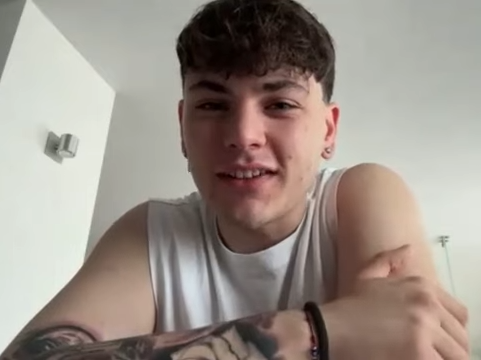
- Petit in 2024

Background information
- Born: Salvatore Moccia; 23 August 2005 (age 21); Rome, Lazio, Italy
- Genre: Pop
- Occupation: Singer-songwriter
- Instrument: Vocals
- Years active: 2023–present
- Labels: ADA Music Italy; 21co; Warner Music Italy

Salvatore Moccia (born 23 August 2005), known professionally as Petit, is an Italian singer-songwriter.

== Early life and education ==
Born in Rome in 2005 to a French mother and Neapolitan father, Salvatore Moccia began writing his first lyrics in Neapolitan at the age of thirteen following the death of his grandmother. He grew up listening to Pino Daniele and Franco Califano. Passionate about soccer, he played as a midfielder for Avellino's Giovanissimi Regionali Under 14 team until 2023. Through the pseudonym "Petit", the artist aims to identify a multitude of people who follow him in his footsteps.

== Career ==
In 2023, he released the single "Taki Taki" on the ADA Music Italy label. In September of the same year, he auditioned for the twenty-third edition of the music talent show Amici di Maria De Filippi, broadcast on Canale 5, and then made it to the initial stage. In March 2024, he gained access to the evening phase of the program, joining the team led by professors Alessandra Celentano and Rudy Zerbi. The following May, he reached the final, placing third and winning the TIM Communications Award.

While participating in Amici he released several unreleased songs, including "Che fai" (produced by Takagi & Ketra), "Guagliò" (produced by Zef), "Tornerai" (certified gold record) and "Mammamì" (certified platinum record), included in his self-titled EP, released on 17 May 2024, also containing the songs "Feriscimi" and Brooklyn. In the summer of the same year he performed at various musical events, including the RDS Summer Festival, TIM Summer Hits, Battiti Live, 105 Summer Festival and Yoga Radio Bruno Estate.

In July 2024, the single "Mammamì RMX" was released, a reworked version of "Mammamì" featuring SLF and Fred De Palma. On 13 September she released the single "Lingerie". The single "Mezzanotte" was released on 13 March 2025, followed on May 15 by the single "Vivere da morire" and on 13 June by the single "Vitamì".

In October 2025, he was chosen to compete in Sanremo Giovani 2025, the youth selection for the Sanremo Music Festival 2026, with the song "Un bel casino". He advanced from the first phase on 25 November but was ultimately eliminated in the semi-final of 9 December. The following year, he was selected to compete in Sanremo Giovani 2026.

== Discography ==
=== Extended play ===
List of EPs and with selected chart positions
Title	EP details	Peak chart positions
Title	EP details	ITA
Petit	Released: 17 May 2024; Label: Warner Music Italy; Format: CD, digital download, streaming	10

=== Singles ===
List of singles, with chart positions and album name
Single	Year	Peak chart positions	Certifications	Album or EP
Single	Year	ITA	Certifications	Album or EP
"Taki Taki"	2023	—		Non-album singles
"Che fai"	2023	72		Petit
"Guagliò"	2023	—		Petit
"Tornerai"	2024	80	FIMI: Gold	Petit
"Mammamì"	2024	30	FIMI: Platinum	Petit
"Mammamì RMX" (featuring SLF and Fred De Palma)	2024	—		Non-album singles
"Lingerie"	2024	—		Non-album singles
"Mezzanotte"	2025	—		Non-album singles
"Vivere da morire"	2025	—		Non-album singles
"Vitamì"	2025	—		Non-album singles
"Un bel casino"	2025	—		Non-album singles
"—" denotes singles that did not chart or were not released.

== Television programs ==
Year	Title	Network	Notes
2023–2024	Amici di Maria De Filippi	Canale 5	Contestant (season 23)
2024	This Is Me	Canale 5	Guest

== Participation in singing events ==
- Sanremo Giovani (Rai 2)
  - 2025 – Non-finalist with "Un bel casino"
  - 2026

== Awards and nominations ==
Year	Award	Nomination	Work	Result	Notes
2024	Amici di Maria De Filippi	TIM Communication Award	Himself	Won	
