= The Perfect Dinner =

2022 Italian comedy film

- Italian: La cena perfetta
- Directed by: Davide Minnella
- Written by: Stefano Sardo; Giordana Mari; Gianluca Bernardini
- Produced by: Federica Lucisano; Fulvio Lucisano
- Starring: Salvatore Esposito; Greta Scarano; Gianluca Fru; Gianfranco Gallo; Antonella Attili; Antonio Grosso
- Edited by: Sarah McTeigue
- Music by: Michele Braga
- Production companies: Italian International Film; Lucisano Media Group; Vision Distribution
- Release date: 26 April 2022 (Italy)
- Running time: 106 minutes
- Country: Italy
- Language: Italian
- Box office: $217,697

The Perfect Dinner (Italian: La cena perfetta) is a 2022 Italian comedy film directed by Davide Minnella.

== Cast ==
- Salvatore Esposito as Carmine Giordano
- Greta Scarano as Consuelo Banega
- Gianluca Fru as Rosario
- Gianfranco Gallo as Don Pasquale Rizzuto
- Antonella Attili as Magistrate Maria Iodice
- Antonio Grosso
- Federico Le Pera as Jacopo
- Cristina Bowerman as herself
