= Mago Forest =

Italian comedian (born 1961)

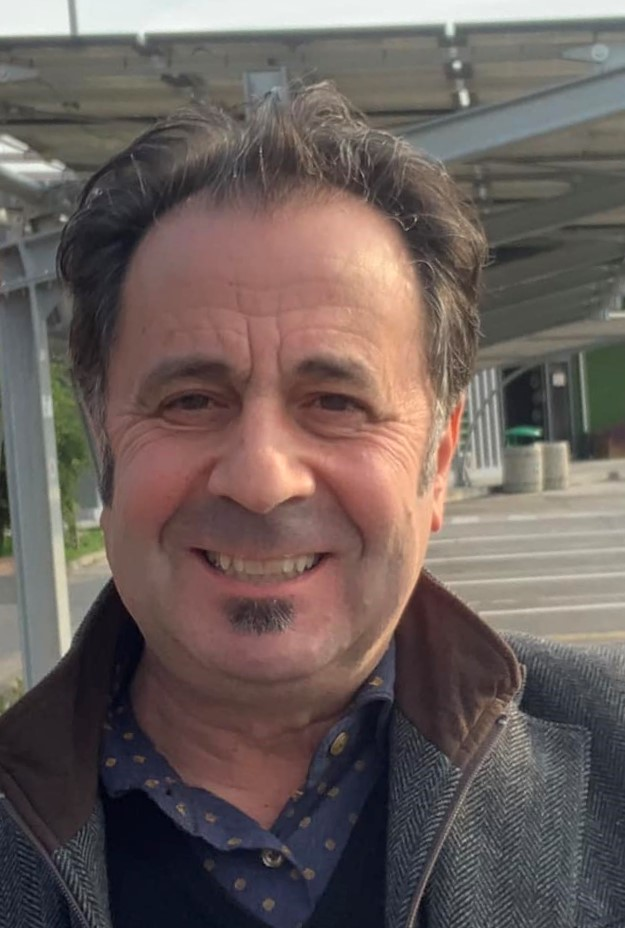
- Forest in 2022
- Born: 22 February 1961 (age 65); Nicosia, Sicily, Italy
- Occupation: Comedian
- Spouse: Angela (2012)

Michele Foresta (born 22 February 1961), best known as Mago Forest or Mr. Forest, is an Italian comedian, television presenter and actor.

== Life and career ==
Born in Nicosia, Sicily, Foresta graduated in accounting and then moved to Milan, where he studied at the Maurizio Nichetti's acting school "Quelli di Grock". After performing in numerous clubs, he was noted by Renzo Arbore, and in 1988 he made his television debut in Arbore's show Indietro tutta. In the first half of the 1990s he was mainly active as a sidekick of Nino Frassica in a number of television shows.

Forest had his breakout in the late 1990s, thanks to his participation in the Mediaset comedy show Zelig. In 2001 he started a long collaboration with Gialappa's Band, hosting Mai dire Maik and most of their subsequent Mai dire franchise shows. He presented the 2006 edition of Festivalbar together with Cristina Chiabotto and Ilary Blasi. In 2022, he took part in the Prime Video show LOL - Chi ride è fuori and in its spin-off LOL Xmas Special, which he won.

Forest also appeared in several films, and was the Italian voice of Doctor Neo Cortex in the Crash Bandicoot video games Crash of the Titans and Mind over Mutant.
