= Stefano Chiodaroli =

Italian actor and stand-up comedian

- Born: 15 December 1964 (age 61); Albizzate, Italy
- Occupation: Actor
- Years active: 1998-present

Stefano Chiodaroli (born 15 December 1964) is an Italian actor and stand-up comedian.

== Career ==
=== Early life ===
Born in Albizzate, Varese into a family of workers, before focusing on his career as an entertainer, Chiodaroli did several jobs including milling machine operator, lathe operator, agent of trade and warehouseman. An expert in Fire breathing and a street acrobat, after acting in some amateur companies, he made his professional debut in 1983 with the comedy ensemble Triopastello. Graduated in 1990 at the School of Theatre Mimodramma, he participated in theater festivals in Arkhangelsk in Russia and in Lepujenvelaj in France.

In 1995 he started working on stage as a playwright and later as an actor joining the short-lived trio "Gli Ottomani".

=== The baker and the success ===
In 1998 Chiodaroli created the comic caricature of a short-tempered baker, a character that allowed him to access to some major Italian television variety shows such as Zelig (Canale 5), Convention a colori (Rai 2) and Colorado Cafe (Italia 1). Other Chiodaroli's characters include the Celtic demigod "Tempesta Ormonale" (appeared in the Rai 2 prime time show Bulldozer), the surreal "Magician Abatjour", the former fashion model Ornello, the jazz trumpeter Brian.

In 2005 Chiodaroli had the leading role of Mariano, a good-hearted car thief and thug, in the Italia 1 sitcom Belli dentro ("Beautiful inside").

== Selected filmography ==
- La terza stella (2005)
- The Fever (2005)
- Belli dentro (TV, 2005)
- The Bodyguard's Cure (2006)
- Really SSSupercool: Chapter Two (2006)
- 2061: An Exceptional Year (2007)
- Don Luca c'è (TV, 2008)
- Cado dalle nubi (2009)
- Angel of Evil (2010)
- In tour (TV, 2011)
- Wannabe Widowed (2013)

== Television ==
- Saturday Night Live from Milano
- Seven Show
- Bulldozer (TV program)
- Zelig (TV program)
- Belli dentro
- Don Luca c'è
- Fiore e Tinelli
- Love Bugs (TV program)
- Colorado (TV program)
