= Carlo Amleto =

Italian comedian, actor and singer (born 1993)

- Amleto in 2023
- Born: Carlo Amleto Giammusso; 21 May 1993 (age 33); San Cataldo, Sicily, Italy
- Occupations: Comedian; actor; singer; musician
- Years active: 2019–present

Carlo Amleto Giammusso (born 21 May 1993), known professionally as Carlo Amleto, is an Italian comedian, actor, singer and musician. He is known for his musical comedy sketches and has appeared on Italian television programmes including Zelig, Bar Stella and Gialappa Show.

== Life and career ==
Amleto was born in San Cataldo, Sicily, and grew up in Caltanissetta. He studied at the city's Liceo Classico Ruggero Settimo before studying jazz piano and acting. He attended the Paolo Grassi Drama School in Milan and became a member of the comedy collective Contenuti Zero, performing in theatrical productions with other former students. He gained wider attention in 2022, when he joined the cast of Zelig, performing TGzero, a musical parody of television news broadcasts. He also appeared on Bar Stella on Rai 2, both with Contenuti Zero and as a solo performer.

In 2023, Amleto released his debut album, Facciamo che io ero, preceded by the single "Con senza picanto". The album inspired the stage show Scherzo N°1, Opera Prima. In 2024, he joined the cast of the radio programme Radio 2 Social Club, and in 2025 he became a cast member of Gialappa Show on Sky Uno and TV8. In 2026, Amleto competed in the sixth season of the comedy game show LOL - Chi ride è fuori, released on Amazon Prime Video. In the same year, he starred in the black comedy Un tranquillo funerale di famiglia, directed by Massimiliano Bruno.

== Filmography ==
Film
Year	Title	Role	Notes
2020	Tutti per uno, uno per tutti	Cadet Saint-Juste	
2024	I soliti idioti 3: Il ritorno	Fabri X	
2026	Un tranquillo funerale di famiglia	Don Mauro	

Television series
Year	Title	Role	Notes
2022	Viola	Felice Greco	Episode "Arancione come la fiducia"
2024	Vanina	Antineo	Episode "La logica della lampara"

== Television ==
- Zelig (Canale 5, 2022)
- Bar Stella (Rai 2, 2022–2023)
- LOL: Talent Show (Prime Video, 2024) – contestant
- Splendida cornice (Rai 3, 2024)
- Stasera tutto è possibile (Rai 2, 2024–2025)
- Gialappa Show (TV8/Sky Uno, 2025–present)
- LOL - Chi ride è fuori (Prime Video, 2026) – contestant

== Discography ==
- Facciamo che io ero (2023)
