= Gianluca Fru =

Italian actor and comedian (born 1995)

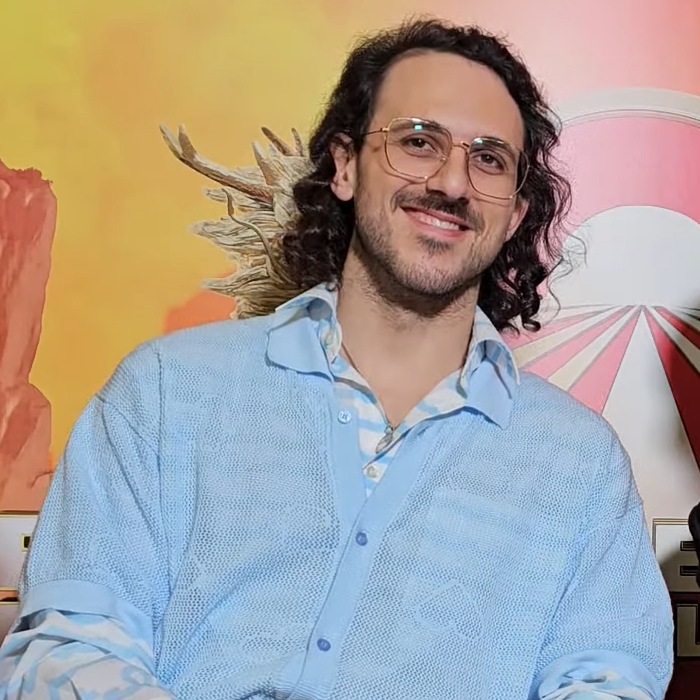
- Fru in 2024
- Born: Gianluca Colucci; 13 November 1995 (age 30); Naples, Italy
- Occupations: Actor, comedian
- Years active: 2016–present
- Height: 178 cm (5 ft 10 in)

Gianluca Colucci (born 13 November 1995), known professionally as Gianluca Fru, is an Italian actor, television presenter and comedian.

== Life and career ==
Born in Naples, Gianluca Colucci spent his childhood in Vibo Marina, Calabria, until the age of 11. After returning to his hometown, he attended the Archimede High School in the Neapolitan suburb of Ponticelli, where he graduated in 2014. In 2016, he joined the comedy group The Jackal, and made his film debut in the group's first feature film Addio fottuti musi verdi. He adopted the stage name Gianluca Fru, after American guitarist John Frusciante.

In 2021, Fru was part of the main cast of the Netflix series Generation 56K. That same year, he participated as a contestant in the first season of the reality game show LOL - Chi ride è fuori, ranking at the last place.

In 2022, he competed with Aurora Leone as contestants in the ninth season of Pechino Express on Sky Uno. The next year, he made his debut as a host on Italia's Got Talent. In 2024, he returned to Pechino Express as co-host, alongside Costantino della Gherardesca.

Since 2023, Fru has been starring in the Amazon series Pesci piccoli.

On 15 February 2025, during the final night of the 75th Sanremo Music Festival, Fru appeared on stage during The Kolors' performance of "Tu con chi fai l'amore".

== Filmography ==
Film
Year	Title	Role	Notes
2017	Addio fottuti musi verdi	Pilot	Film debut
2022	The Perfect Dinner	Rosario	

Television
Year	Title	Role	Notes
2020	Don Matteo	Fru	TV series; episode "Non commettere adulterio"
2021	Generation 56K	Luca Battaglia	TV series; main role
2023–present	Pesci piccoli	Gianluca	TV series; main role
2025	Sconfort Zone	Gianluca	TV series; main role

== Television programs ==
Television programs
Year	Title	Role	Network
2019–2022	Stasera tutto è possibile	Guest	Rai 2
2021	LOL - Chi ride è fuori	Contestant	Amazon Prime Video
2022; 2024–2025	Pechino Express	Contestant (2022); Co-host (2024–25)	Sky Uno
2023–2025	Italia's Got Talent	Host	Sky Uno

== Books ==
- Fru, Gianluca (2023). Come imparare tutte le bandiere del mondo con il metodo Fru. Anche se non vi servirà mai. Milan: Mondadori Electa. ISBN 978-8891839688.
