= Fabio Balsamo =

Italian actor and comedian (born 1989)

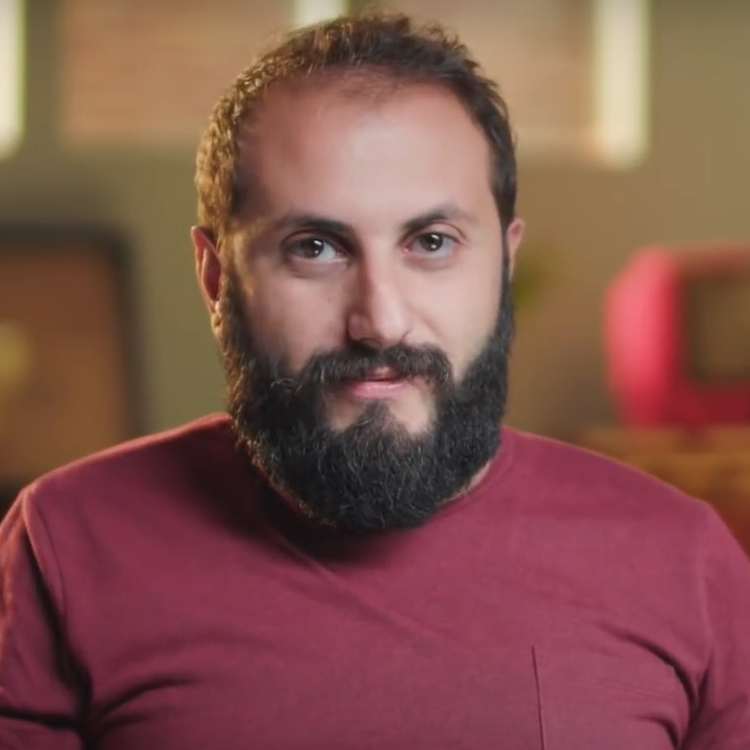
- Balsamo in 2018
- Born: 2 January 1989 (age 37); Casalnuovo di Napoli, Campania, Italy
- Occupations: Actor, comedian
- Years active: 2015–present

Fabio Balsamo (born 2 January 1989) is an Italian actor, television presenter and comedian.

== Life and career ==
He attended the Università Popolare dello Spettacolo in Naples. In 2015, Balsamo joined the comedy group The Jackal, and made his film debut in Babbo Natale non viene da nord by Maurizio Casagrande. In 2017, he starred in The Jackal's first feature film Addio fottuti musi verdi. In 2023, he participated as a contestant in the third season of LOL - Chi ride è fuori, winning it along with Luca Bizzarri.

In 2021, he was part of the main cast of Netflix series Generation 56K.

Balsamo also appeared in television as co-host of the Italian version of game shows Name That Tune (2022–23) and The Floor (2024).

== Filmography ==
Film
Year	Title	Role	Notes
2016	Babbo Natale non viene da nord	Papele	Film debut
2017	Addio fottuti musi verdi	Fabio	
2020	7 Hours to Win Your Heart	Ernesto	
2022	Imperfetti criminali	Pietro	
2022	Falla girare: The Last Joint	Oreste Scherillo	
2022	Beata te	Gabriel	
2023	Tre di troppo	Giovanni	
2024	Falla girare 2: Offline	Oreste Scherillo	

Television
Year	Title	Role	Notes
2017	Sirene	Taxi driver	TV series; episode 1
2020	Don Matteo	Fabio	TV series; episode "Non commettere adulterio"
2021	Generation 56K	Sandro Farina	TV series; main role
2023–present	Pesci piccoli	Fabio	TV series; main role
2024	No Activity: Italy	Dario Diotallevi	TV series; main role
2024–2026	Piedone - Uno sbirro a Napoli	Noviello	TV series; main role
2025	Un professore	Father Astolfo	TV series; episode "San Benedetto: ora et labora"

== Television programs ==
Television programs
Year	Title	Role	Network
2019–2022	Stasera tutto è possibile	Guest	Rai 2
2020	Qui e adesso	Regular guest	Rai 3
2022–2023	Name That Tune	Co-host	TV8
2022	Celebrity Hunted: Italy	Contestant	Amazon Prime Video
2023	LOL - Chi ride è fuori	Contestant / Winner	Amazon Prime Video
2024	The Floor	Co-host	Rai 2
