= Geppi Cucciari =

Italian stand-up comedian, actress, and television presenter (born 1973)

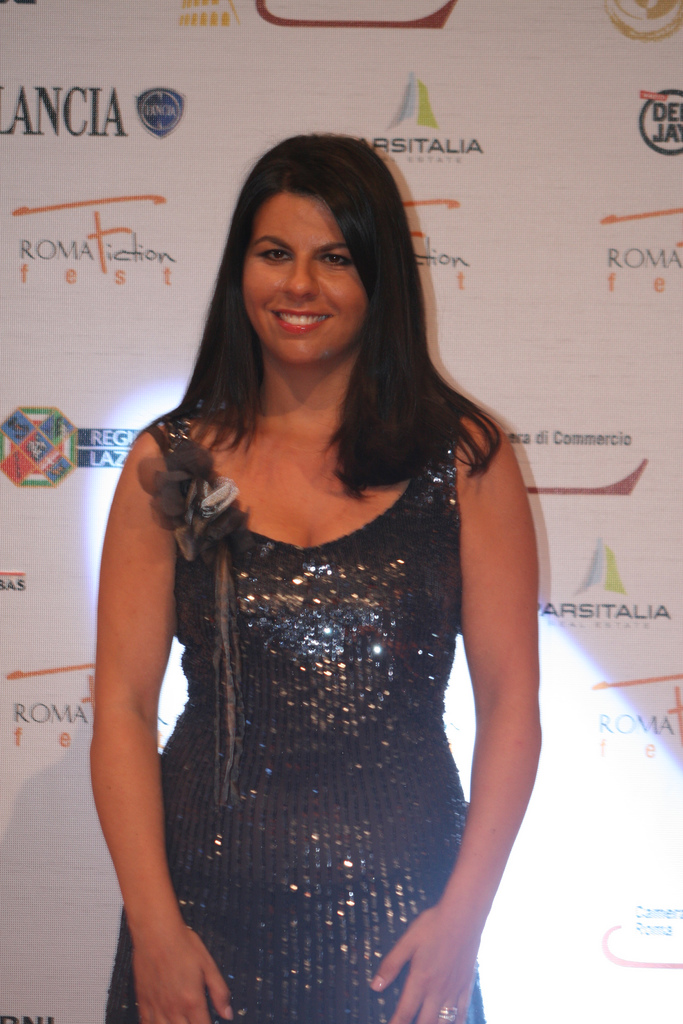
- Born: Maria Giuseppina Cucciari; 18 August 1973 (age 53); Cagliari, Italy
- Education: Università Cattolica del Sacro Cuore
- Occupations: Stand-up comedian; television presenter; actress

Maria Giuseppina "Geppi" Cucciari (born 18 August 1973) is an Italian stand-up comedian, actress and television presenter.

== Life and career ==
Born in Cagliari, Cucciari spent her youth in Macomer, in the province of Nuoro. She studied law at the University of Cagliari, and eventually moved to Milan where she graduated at the Università Cattolica del Sacro Cuore. In 2000 she joined the theater workshop "Scaldasole" and later entered the artistic laboratory Zelig.

After working on stage and in several radio programs, Cucciari had her breakout in 2003 with the variety show Zelig Off. Between 2005 and 2009, she was a regular in the sitcom Belli dentro, and in 2006 she debuted as a writer with the humour fiction novel Meglio donna che male accompagnata. As a presenter, she hosted two editions of the Canale 5 show Italia's Got Talent, the show Splendida cornice, and she co-hosted the fourth night of the Sanremo Music Festival 2025, alongside Mahmood and Carlo Conti.

In 2025, her film Life Goes This Way will open the 20th Rome Film Festival on 15 October 2025.

== Filmography ==
=== Films ===
Year	Title	Role(s)	Notes
2008	Grande, grosso e... Verdone	Tecla	
2013	L'arbitro	Miranda	
2013	A Liberal Passion	Martina	
2014	A Woman as a Friend	Cecilia	
2014	Un fidanzato per mia moglie	Camilla Ledda	
2017	The Lego Batman Movie	Barbara Gordon / Batgirl	Italian dub; voice role
2018	The Man Who Bought the Moon	None	Only writer
2023	Il cacio con le pere	Anca	
2024	Romeo Is Juliet	Gloria	
2024	Diamonds	Fausta	
2025	Life Goes This Way	Giovanna	
2026	Zustìssia	Irene Testa	
2026	Nella gioia e nel dolore †	TBA	Post-production

=== Television ===
Year	Title	Role(s)	Notes
2003–2008	Zelig Off	Herself / Cast member	Sketch comedy (seasons 1–2; 8–10)
2004–2005	Comedy Lab	Herself / Cast member	Sketch comedy
2005–2012	Belli dentro	Maria "Gonni" Gonaria	Lead role
2006	Attacco allo Stato	Katrina Boratto	Two-parts television film
2007	Geppi Hour	Herself / Host	Variety show
2010–2011	Italia's Got Talent	Herself / Host	Talent show (seasons 1–2)
2010	Let's Dance	Herself / Judge	Dance competition
2011–2012	G'Day	Herself / Host	Variety show
2013	Concerto del Primo Maggio	Herself / Host	Annual concert event
2013–2016	Premio Campiello	Herself / Host	Annual awards ceremony
2014–2020	Per un pugno di libri	Herself / Host	Game show (seasons 15–22)
2016	Le Iene	Herself / Host	Variety show (season 19)
2016–2018	Le parole della settimana	Herself / Co-host	Talk show (seasons 1–2)
2019	Rai Pipol	Herself / Host	Talk show
2019–2022	Gazzetta Sports Awards	Herself / Host	Annual awards ceremony
2020	Danza con me	Herself / Guest	Special
2020–2022	Che succ3de?	Herself / Host	Talk show
2021–2024	Strega Prize	Herself / Host	Annual awards ceremony
2023–present	Splendida cornice	Herself / Host	Variety show
2025	Sanremo Music Festival 2025	Herself / Co-host	Annual music festival
2025	LOL - Chi ride è fuori	Herself / Contestant	Reality show (season 5)
2026	Peccato	Herself / Manuela Fanelli	Episode: "The Cheesecake Theory"

=== Stage ===
Year	Title	Role(s)	Venue
2014–2015	The Addams Family	Morticia Addams	Italian tour

== Honours and achievements ==
=== Orders ===
- 5th Class / Knight: Cavaliere Ordine al Merito della Repubblica Italiana: 2015
