= Il Milanese Imbruttito =

- Website type: Satirical blog and YouTube channel
- Available in: Italian
- Headquarters: Milan
- Owners: Marco De Crescenzio, Federico Marisio, Tommaso Pozza
- Creators: Marco De Crescenzio, Federico Marisio, Tommaso Pozza
- Website: www.ilmilaneseimbruttito.com
- Commercial: yes
- Launched: 2013

Il Milanese Imbruttito (Italian for The Disgruntled Milanese) it's an Italian satirical blog and YouTube channel parodizing the stereotypical traits, habits and catchphrases of the work-centered lifestyle of people living and working in Milan. It has been launched in 2013, and by 2017 it had grown a following of about 1.5 million viewers and readers, becoming an internet phenomenon in Italy. The three founders and authors are Marco De Crescenzio, Federico Marisio and Tommaso Pozza.

The YouTube channel hosts different types of content. The interviste imbruttite segment is a series of interviews to passersby. A few years after the launch of the channel, scripted fictional episodes were also introduced, with actor Germano Lanzoni playing the role of a stereotypical Milan small-businessman.

In 2016, Italian traditional publisher Rizzoli published Milanesità, istruzioni per l’uso ("Milaneseness, instruction manual"), the second book on the subject by the Milanese Imbruttito authors. In 2018, it also debuted in theaters with a comedy play co-authored by Lanzoni and director Walter Leonardi.

== See also ==
- Office Space (1999 black comedy movie satirizing 9-to-5 work life)
