= L'arbitro (2013 film) =

- Directed by: Paolo Zucca
- Written by: Paolo Zucca
- Starring: Stefano Accorsi; Geppi Cucciari; Francesco Pannofino; Jacopo Cullin; Benito Urgu
- Cinematography: Patrizio Patrizi
- Edited by: Walter Fasano
- Music by: Andrea Guerra
- Release date: 2013
- Running time: 96 minutes
- Country: Italy
- Language: Italian

L'arbitro (transl. The referee) is a 2013 comedy film written and directed by Paolo Zucca.

The film was chosen as a pre-opener to the 10th edition of the Critic's Week Venice Days, at the 70th Venice International Film Festival.

== Cast ==
- Stefano Accorsi as Cruciani
- Geppi Cucciari as Miranda
- Jacopo Cullin as Matzutzi
- Marco Messeri as White
- Benito Urgu as Prospero
- Francesco Pannofino as Arbitro Mureno
- Alessio Di Clemente as Brai
- Grégoire Oestermann as Jean Michel
- Andres Gioeni as guardalinee Cruciani
- Gustavo De Filpo as guardalinee Cruciani
