= Alessandro Cattelan =

Italian television personality (born 1980)

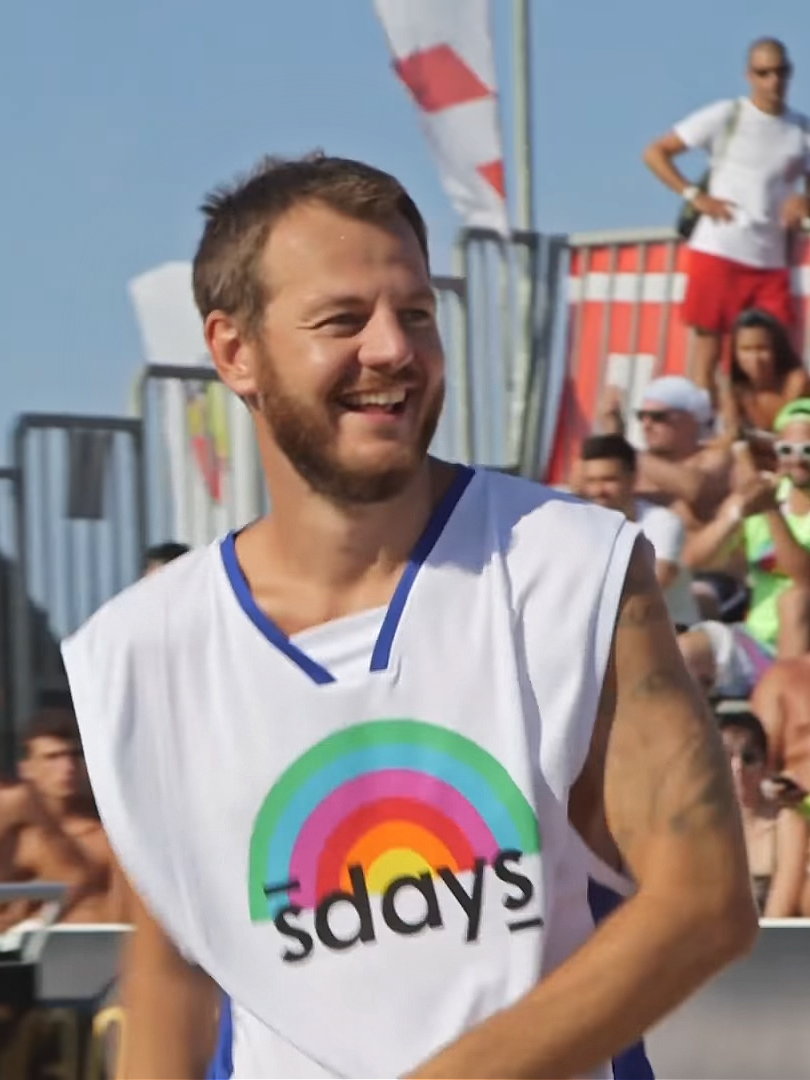
- Cattelan in 2017
- Born: 11 May 1980 (age 45); Tortona, Italy
- Occupation: Television presenter
- Years active: 2003–present
- Employer(s): Sky Italia (2011–2020) RAI (since 2021)
- Spouse: Ludovica Sauer (m. 2014)
- Children: 2

Alessandro Cattelan (born 11 May 1980) is an Italian television, soccer player and radio presenter best known for presenting the Italian edition of Total Request Live, broadcast by MTV Italia, and Le Iene, broadcast by Mediaset's Italia 1. Cattelan also hosted the Italian version of The X Factor from 2011 to 2020.

During the 2018–19 season, Cattelan presented the Italian late show E poi c'è Cattelan (EPCC), on air on Sky Uno. He was also nominated, as a possible candidate for the Sanremo Music Festival 2020, as well as being confirmed by RAI as one of the three hosts of the Eurovision Song Contest 2022, alongside Laura Pausini and Mika, after he signed a contract with the national broadcaster. He co-hosted the final of Sanremo 2025 with Carlo Conti and Alessia Marcuzzi.

Cattelan is a devoted fan of football club Inter Milan, and is often present in the stadium and training sessions of the team.

== Filmography ==
Film roles showing year released, title, role played and notes
Title	Year	Role	Notes
Ogni maledetto Natale	2014	Massimo Marinelli	Feature film debut
The Angry Birds Movie	2016	Chuck (voice)	Italian dub
The Secret Life of Pets	2016	Max (voice)	Italian dub
I'm Back	2018	Himself	Cameo appearance
The Angry Birds Movie 2	2019	Chuck (voice)	Italian dub
The Secret Life of Pets 2	2019	Max (voice)	Italian dub

== Television ==
Television appearances showing year released, title, role played and notes
Title	Year	Channel	Role	Notes
Ziggie	2003–2005	Italia 1	Presenter	Children's television program (seasons 2–3)
Most Wanted	2004–2005	MTV Italia	Presenter	Talk show
Viva Las Vegas	2005	MTV Italia	Presenter	Reality show
Total Request Live	2005–2008	MTV Italia	Presenter	Musical program (seasons 6–9)
Le Iene	2006	Italia 1	Reporter	Satirical program (season 10)
Total Request Live On Tour	2006–2008	MTV Italia	Presenter	Tour version of Total Request Live
Lazarus	2008	MTV Italia	Co-host	Reality show
X Factor	2011–2020	Sky Uno	Presenter	Talent show (seasons 5–14)
Italia Loves Emilia	2012	Sky Primafila	Presenter	Special
E poi c'è Cattelan	2014–2020	Sky Uno	Presenter	Late show
2016 David di Donatello	2016	Sky Uno	Presenter	Annual ceremony
2017 David di Donatello	2017	Sky Uno	Presenter	Annual ceremony
Da grande	2021	Rai 1	Presenter	Variety show in two nights
Alessandro Cattelan: One Simple Question	2022	Netflix	Creator, host	Documentary series
Eurovision Song Contest 2022	2022	Rai 1 / EBU	Co-host	Music program
Sanremo Music Festival 2025	2025	Rai 1	Co-host (final night)	Music program

Preceded by (Netherlands) Chantal Janzen, Edsilia Rombley, Jan Smit and Nikkie de Jager	Eurovision Song Contest presenter 2022; With: Laura Pausini and Mika	Succeeded by (United Kingdom) Alesha Dixon, Hannah Waddingham, (Ukraine) Julia Sanina and (Republic of Ireland) Graham Norton (final)
