= Belli dentro =

- Genre: Black comedy
- Created by: Giancarlo Bozzo
- Starring: Geppi Cucciari; Brunella Andreoli; Alessandra Ierse; Claudio Batta; Stefano Chiodaroli; Lorenzo Manera
- Country of origin: Italy
- No. of seasons: 4
- No. of episodes: 70

Production
- Running time: 22 - 24 min

Original release
- Network: Canale 5, Italia 1
- Release: February 13, 2005 – July 17, 2012

Belli dentro (Beautiful Inside) is an Italian black comedy television series, notable for its setting in a prison.

== See also ==
- List of Italian television series
