= Aurora Leone =

Italian actress and comedian (born 1995)

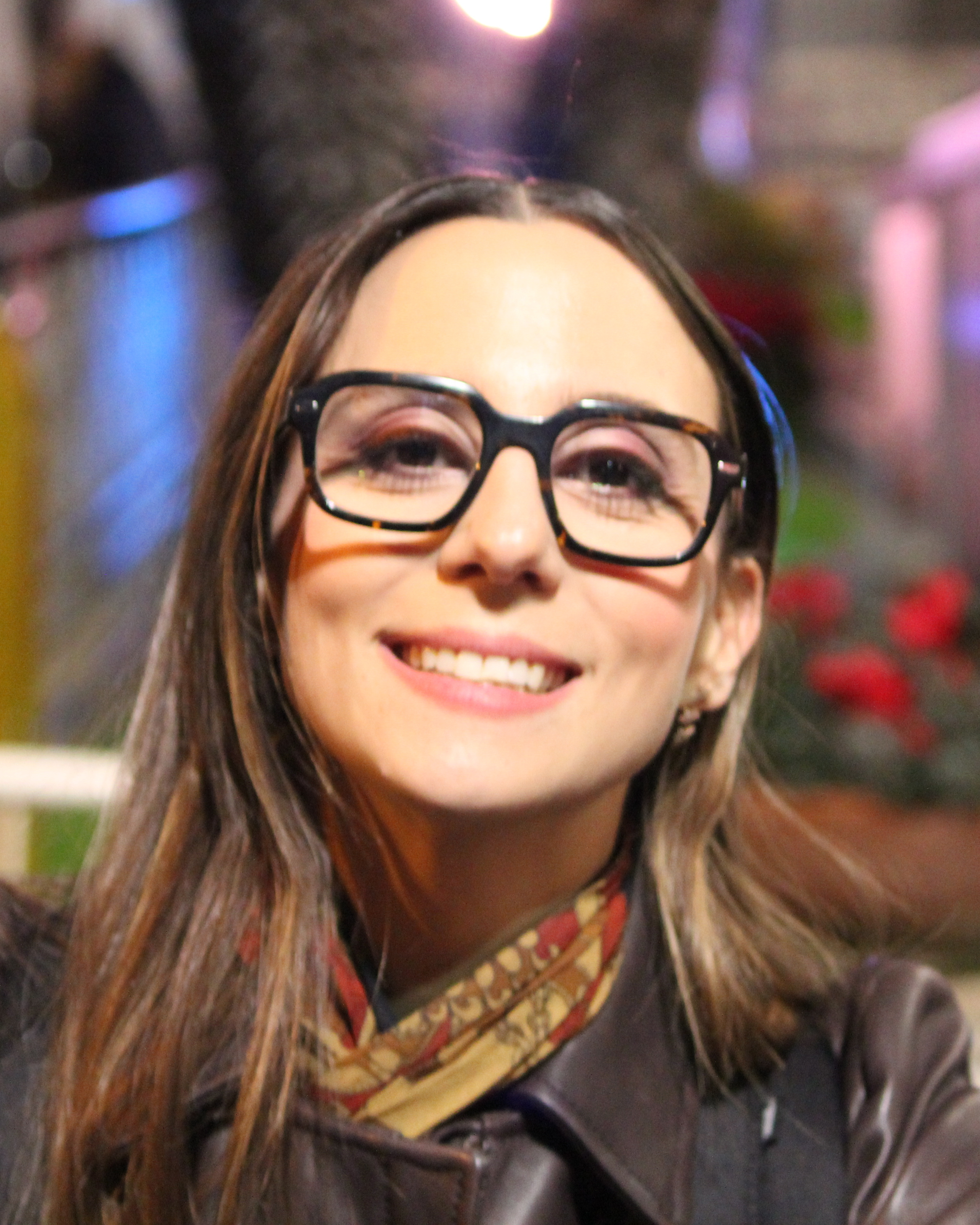
- Leone at the Sanremo Music Festival 2026
- Born: 18 May 1999 (age 26); Caserta, Campania, Italy
- Occupations: Actress, comedian, television presenter
- Years active: 2019–present

Aurora Leone (born 18 May 1999) is an Italian actress, comedian and television presenter.

== Life and career ==
Leone made her television debut in 2019 on the ninth season of Italia's Got Talent, where she reached the finals and finished in fifth place. Her visibility from the show led to her joining The Jackal, a comedy collective based in Naples.

In 2022, she competed in the ninth season of the reality series Pechino Express, finishing in third place alongside fellow comedian Gianluca Fru. That same year, she also appeared on the Prime Video improv-based game show Prova prova sa sa.

Since 2023, Leone has been one of the lead actors in the comedy series Pesci piccoli, created in collaboration with The Jackal. That year, she also starred in Una famiglia a pretesto, a stage performance released as a Prime Video special. Additionally, she was appointed co-host of Italia's Got Talent alongside Fru, starting from its thirteenth season.

In 2024, she placed third in the fourth season of LOL – Chi ride è fuori. The following year, her solo stage show Tutto scontato premiered in major Italian cities and subsequently toured across Europe.

== Filmography ==
Film
Year	Title	Role	Notes
2023	Massimo Troisi: Somebody Down There Likes Me	Herself	Documentary

Television
Year	Title	Role	Notes
2023–present	Pesci piccoli	Aurora	TV series; main role

== Television programs ==
Television programs
Year	Title	Role	Network
2019	Italia's Got Talent	Contestant (5th place)	Sky Uno
2022–2023	Prova prova sa sa	Regular	Amazon Prime Video
2022	Pechino Express	Contestant (3rd place)	Sky Uno
2023	Aurora Leone: Una famiglia a pretesto	Herself	Amazon Prime Video
2023–2025	Italia's Got Talent	Host	Sky Uno; Disney+
2024	LOL - Chi ride è fuori	Contestant	Amazon Prime Video
