= Vacanze di Natale a Cortina =

- Directed by: Neri Parenti
- Written by: Neri Parenti; Enrico Vanzina; Carlo Vanzina
- Starring: Christian De Sica; Sabrina Ferilli; Ricky Memphis; Dario Bandiera; Katia Follesa; Ivano Marescotti; Giuseppe Giacobazzi; Valeria Graci; Emanuele Filiberto
- Cinematography: Tani Canevari
- Music by: Bruno Zambrini
- Release date: December 16, 2011
- Running time: 108 minutes
- Country: Italy
- Language: Italian

Vacanze di Natale a Cortina (lit. 'Christmas holidays in Cortina') is a 2011 Italian Christmas comedy film written and directed by Neri Parenti.

The film features many cameos including Bob Sinclar, Renato Balestra, Edinson Cavani, Prince Emanuele Filiberto, Cesare Prandelli, Mara Venier and Simona Ventura. It grossed $14,847,186 at the Italian box office.

== Plot ==
During the Christmas holidays, in Cortina d'Ampezzo interweave three stories. The lawyer Covelli discovers that his wife is unfaithful, but in straight lines is not so, but the wife decides to play along. Two poor sellers want to make jealous their relatives peasants who have won the lottery. Finally, a Sicilian hairdresser must assist his master, who must sign a contract with a Russian rich man for the future of electricity in Italy.

== Cast ==
- Christian De Sica as Roberto Covelli
- Sabrina Ferilli as Elena Covelli
- Dario Bandiera as Lando
- Ricky Memphis as Massimo Proietti
- Valeria Graci as Brunella Proietti
- Katia Follesa as Wanda
- Giuseppe Giacobazzi as Andrea
- Ivano Marescotti as Ugo Brigatti

== See also ==
- List of Christmas films
- List of Italian films of 2011
