= Ciro Priello =

Italian actor, TV host and comedian (born 1986)

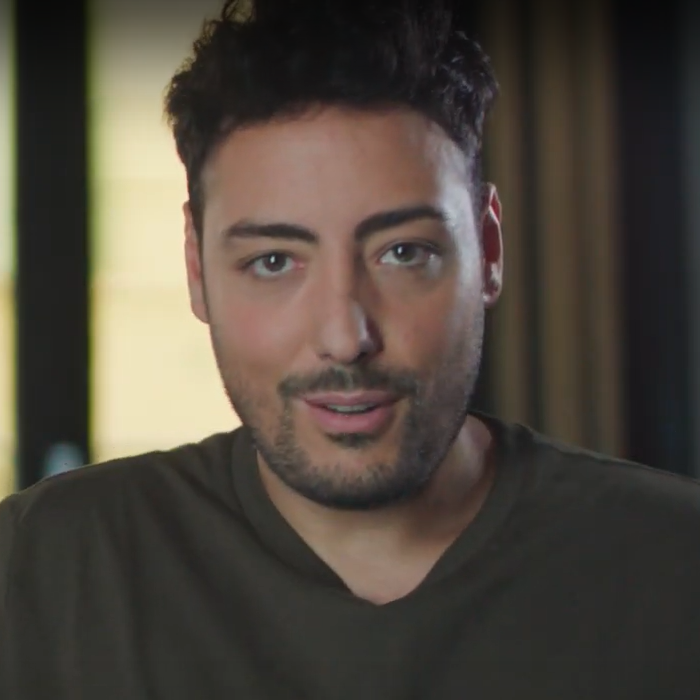
- Priello in 2018
- Born: 12 March 1986 (age 39); Naples, Italy
- Occupation(s): Actor, comedian, TV host
- Years active: 2005–present

Ciro Capriello (born 12 March 1986), known professionally as Ciro Priello, is an Italian actor, television presenter and comedian.

== Life and career ==
In 2005, he was one of the founders of the comedy group The Jackal. In 2015, he made his film debut with Francesco Albanese's Ci devo pensare. Two years later, he was the lead in the Jackal's feature film Addio fottuti musi verdi. In 2021, he won the first edition of LOL - Chi ride è fuori on Amazon Prime Video.

In May 2022, he published the children's book Anna Super Zep e l'unicorno with De Agostini.

Since 2023, Priello has been starring in the Amazon series Pesci piccoli.

Priello also appeared in television as host of the Italian version of the game shows Name That Tune (2022–23) and The Floor (2024).

== Filmography ==
Film
| Year | Title | Role | Notes |
|---|---|---|---|
| 2015 | Ci devo pensare | Fabio | Film debut |
| 2017 | Cinderella the Cat | Luigi | Voice role |
| 2017 | Addio fottuti musi verdi | Ciro | Lead role |
| 2021 | La tristezza ha il sonno leggero | Giovanni | |
| 2022 | Falla girare: The Last Joint | Guglielmo Bonetti | |
| 2024 | Falla girare 2: Offline | Guglielmo Bonetti | |

Television
| Year | Title | Role | Notes |
|---|---|---|---|
| 2012–2013 | Lost in Google | Ciro Priello | Web series; main role |
| 2020 | Don Matteo | Ciro | TV series; episode "Non commettere adulterio" |
| 2023–present | Pesci piccoli | Ciro | TV series; main role |

== Television programs ==
Television programs
| Year | Title | Role | Network |
|---|---|---|---|
| 2019–2022 | Stasera tutto è possibile | Guest | Rai 2 |
| 2020 | Qui e adesso | Regular guest | Rai 3 |
| 2021 | LOL - Chi ride è fuori | Contestant / Winner | Amazon Prime Video |
| 2021 | Tale e quale show | Guest | Rai 1 |
| 2022–2023 | Name That Tune | Host | TV8 |
| 2022 | Celebrity Hunted: Italy | Contestant | Amazon Prime Video |
| 2024 | The Floor | Host | Rai 2 |
