= Zelig (TV programme) =

Italian comedy television show

- Genre: Comedy
- Created by: Gino & Michele
- Country of origin: Italy
- Original language: Italian

Original release
- Network: Italia 1 (1996–2003); Canale 5 (2003–present)
- Release: 29 October 1996 – present

Zelig is an Italian comedy television show that premiered on Italia 1 in 1996 before moving to Canale 5 in 2003. The programme takes its name from the Zelig cabaret club in Milan, founded in 1986, where it was originally filmed. The programme features stand-up comedians and comedy sketches, and was developed by Gino Vignali and Michele Mozzati, known as Gino & Michele, and artistic director Giancarlo Bozzo.

The show has helped launch the careers of numerous Italian comedians. Its best-known hosts include Claudio Bisio, Michelle Hunziker and Vanessa Incontrada.

After several hiatuses, the programme returned in 2021. In January 2026, Zelig 30 marked the show's 30th anniversary with four special episodes hosted by Bisio and Incontrada. Later that year, Hunziker and the comedy duo Ale e Franz hosted another edition of Zelig 30.

The show has spawned several spin-offs, including Zelig Off and Zelig Circus.

== Comedians ==
- Aldo, Giovanni e Giacomo
- Ale e Franz
- Carlo Amleto
- Max Angioni
- Natalino Balasso
- Anna Maria Barbera
- Federico Basso
- Claudio Batta
- Enrico Bertolino
- Claudio Bisio
- Beppe Braida
- Giovanni Cacioppo
- Davide Calgaro
- Paolo Cevoli
- Gabriele Cirilli
- Antonio Cornacchione
- Paola Cortellesi
- Raul Cremona
- Geppi Cucciari
- Gianluca De Angelis
- Marco Della Noce
- Gioele Dix
- Ficarra e Picone
- Fichi d'India
- Angela Finocchiaro
- Fabrizio Fontana
- Nino Formicola
- Alessandro Fullin
- Dado
- Katia & Valeria
- Giuseppe Giacobazzi
- Michelle Hunziker
- Vanessa Incontrada
- Roberto Lipari
- Mago Forest
- Leonardo Manera
- Teresa Mannino
- Paolo Migone
- Maurizio Lastrico
- Flavio Oreglio
- Antonio Ornano
- Pali e Dispari
- Max Pisu
- Rosalia Porcaro
- Gianmarco Pozzoli
- Andrea Pucci
- Sergio Sgrilli
- Teo Teocoli
- Giovanni Vernia
- Checco Zalone
- Marta Zoboli
- Zuzzurro
