= Alice Bellagamba =

Italian actress and dancer

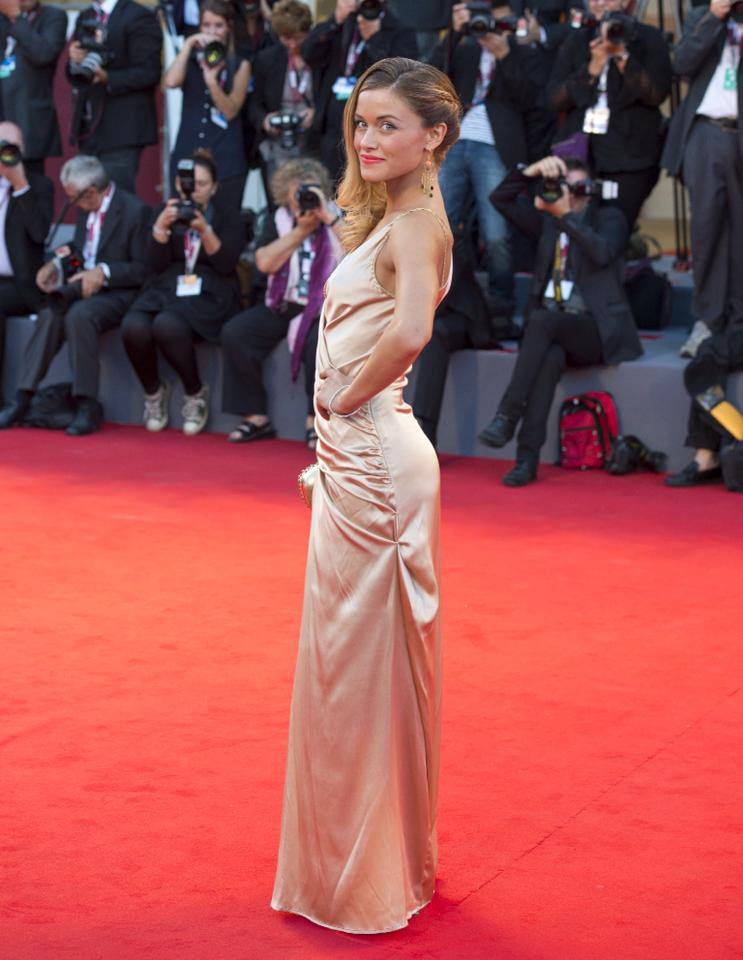
- Alice Bellagamba on Red Carpet the 70ª edition the Venice Film Festival (2013)
- Born: 1 November 1987 (age 38); Iesi, Ancona, Italy
- Occupations: Actress; dancer; screenwriter; director; choreographer

Alice Bellagamba (born 1 November 1987) is an Italian actress and dancer.

== Life and career ==
Bellagamba began skating at the age of six. She reached the third position in couple and first single at the Italian "Acli Italian artistic skating championships". At the age of nine she began modern dancing, with Carla Giacani and Romina Muzzi. Three years later she attended a stage in Florence in the school of the "Tuscany Ballet" and the "Opus Ballet", during which she was noticed by Daniel Tinazzi. The following year, after a scholarship assigned to her by the same school under the direction of Cristina Bozzolini, Bellagamba moves to Florence where she attended the schools and studied dance. At the age of fifteen years she dropped out of school for a professional course of dance but she doesn't interrupt the studies and succeeded in graduating. In the meantime she deepens her dance studies with: Fabrizio Monteverde, Daniel Tinazzi, Eugenio Scigliano, Arianna Benedetti, Mauro Astolfi, Stefania Di Cosimo, Domenique Lesdema, Silvio Oddi, Steve La Chance and Mauro Bigonzetti. In 2002 she joined the company "Junior Balletto di Toscana" and, later, the Aterballetto, performing in theaters of China, New Zealand, Mexico, United States, South Korea and Europe.

5 October 2008: Alice becomes a students of the talent Amici di Maria De Filippi. At the end of the television program, she was the only dancer in the show, and she was classified fourth in the eighth edition of Amici di Maria De Filippi. Her debut was in the musical Io Ballo, under the direction of Chicco Sfondrini and Patrick Rossi Gastaldi, with choreography by Garrison Rochelle, and the other "boys and girls" of the TV show Amici di Maria De Filippi. After that, she was one of the show Amici Tour.

She was noticed by the director Rossella Izzo for the new fiction of Canale 5: Ritmo della vita. In 2009 she starred in the film Balla con noi, directed by Cinzia Bomoll. The film was released in cinema on 27 May 2011. On 5 June 2009, she becomes testimonial for the Foundation "G. SALESI ONLUS", making her own image " available... with the goal to express the joy and the strength of the life.. " for the research and the improvement of the quality hospital accommodation for the children and their families, and for the social support for women and children in conditions of uneasiness.

In 2010 she began studying acting with Francesca Viscardi Leonetti. In June 2010 she made her debut on stage with Non ci posso fare niente based on the 1782 epistolary novel of Choderlos de Laclos Les Liaisons dangereuses. In the same year, she worked in Anna e i 5 – la nuova serie, directed by Franco Amurri. In October of the same year she began her new TV series on Channel 5 Non smettere di sognare by Roberto Burchielli. The series will be broadcast on TV since March 2011.

In 2012 Bellagamba joined the cast of the TV series Provaci ancora prof 4, in the role of Valentina Grassetti, with an international cast of actors and actress, also in 2012, she had a role of Salome in the television miniseries Mary of Nazareth and, after that in the cast of the drama Un passo dal cielo 2 with Terence Hill. In the same year she became the star of the sitcom Talent High School - Il sogno di Sofia, in which she plays the role of a dancer enrolled in an academy show.

In 2013, Bellagamba is the protagonist of the second season of the sitcom produced by LuxVide for DeAgostini: Talent High School 2 - Il sogno di Sofia. In June of the same year she was chosen by Leonardo Pieraccioni for his new holiday movie "A fantastic goings" where she plays Clelia. In October of the same year, Bellagamba presents the Grand Gala of the sixth edition of the International Short Film Festival: "Corti and Cigarettes". On 19 December 2013 he made his debut as a TV presenter with Marche Show! - The living room of Alice on by local broadcast TV Center Marche.

On 30 August, at the 71ª edition the Venice Film Festival, she is rewarded as "Best Emerging Actress" in the first edition of the "International Award", dedicated to Anna Magnani.

In 2015, in the TV miniseries "Pietro Mennea – The arrow South" interprets Carlotta, first love Olympian athlete Pietro Mennea.

In the summer of 2015 he began collaborate, as master trainer, with Madonna's project "Hard Candy Fitness", giving lessons to Rome. In September of the same year he became professor of Modern/Contemporary, always Rome, at the "Kledi Dance" dance school owned by Kledi Kadiu.

On 28 April 2017, at the Festival Tulipani of Seta Nera, she presented her first short film entitled "Last Chance", that has directed, written and she sees it the protagonists as well.

On 10 May 2018, goes out to the cinema the psychological thriller "Le Grida del Silenzio" of which he is co-protagonist. On 14 March 2018 he founded the company of "Balletto delle Marche", of which he is Artistic Director, dancer and choreographer. The Compagnia, after two months of rehearsals, is engaged to perform in the stages of Miss Italy Marche and Abruzzo and in the important Festival evenings of the Marche Region.

== Personal life ==
On 18 October 2014, after a few months of engagement, wed producer Andrea Rizzoli, son of the actress Eleonora Giorgi and the publisher Angelo Rizzoli. On 3 February 2016, from pages of Vanity Fair, announced the separation from her husband.

== Filmography ==
Television
Year	Title	Role	Notes
2008–2009	Amici di Maria De Filippi	Herself	Contestant (season 8)
2009	Amici: La sfida dei talenti	Herself	Contestant
2010	Il ritmo della vita	Elisa	Television film
2011	Non smettere di sognare	Bianca	Main role; 8 episodes
2011	Anna e i cinque	Giada	Recurring role; 4 episodes
2012	Provaci ancora prof	Valentina Grassetti	Main role (season 4); 6 episodes
2012	Mary of Nazareth	Salomé	Television film
2012	Un passo dal cielo	Miriam	Recurring role; 14 episodes
2012–2013	Talent High School	Sofia Perri	Lead role; 48 episodes
2014	Don Matteo	Alma	2 episodes
2014	Che Dio ci aiuti	Flora	Episode: "Omnia Vincit Amor"
2015	Pietro Mennea - La freccia del sud	Carlotta	Miniseries

Films
Year	Title	Role	Notes
2011	Balla con noi	Erika	Feature film debut
2013	Un fantastico via vai	Clelia	
2015	Torno indietro e cambio vita	Daniela	
2016	Conosce qualcuno?	Silvana	Short film
2017	Last Chance	The Woman	Short film; also writer and director
2018	Welcome Home	Isabella	
2018	Le grida del silenzio	Desirée	
2018	The Taylor	Alice Alfieri	Short film
2021	Kontessa	Performer	Fashion film
TBA	Badbarbies	Lana	In post-production

== Television programs ==
=== Competitor ===
- Amici di Maria De Filippi (2008–2009)
- Amici – La sfida dei talenti (2009)

=== Conductor ===
- Marche Show! – Il salotto di Alice (2013)
- Inside The Spot (2017)

== Dance companies ==
- Junior Balletto di Toscana (2002-2004) dancer
- Aterballetto (2004-2008) dancer
- Balletto delle Marche (2018-ongoing) Artistic Director, choreographer and dancer

== Other ==
- Corti and Cigarettes 2013 International Short Film Festival Presenter with Monica Scattini and Dancer (2013)
- Il Gene dello sport with Gene Gnocchi (2014)

== Awards and nominations ==
- 2014: 71ª edition the Venice Film Festival, first edition of the "International Award"
  - Best Emerging Actress
