= Francesco Salvi =

Italian actor, writer and comedian

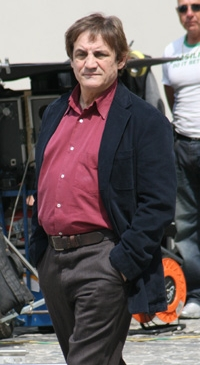
- Born: 7 February 1953 (age 73); Luino, Italy
- Occupations: Actor; singer; writer; director; comedian

Francesco Salvi (born 7 February 1953) is an Italian actor, singer, screenwriter, and director.

== Biography ==
Born in the northern town of Luino, near the Italian border with Switzerland, Salvi started his career in the mid-1980s. His performances over the years have included but are not limited to: cabaret, cinema, animated cinema, music, writing, theatre and television, with varying degrees of success.

During 1985–1987, Francesco Salvi was one of the main characters of the satirical TV variety show Drive In.

From 1988 to 1989, Salvi hosted his own television program, MegaSalviShow; the title song of the show, "C'è da spostare una macchina" ('Gotta Move a Car'), of which Salvi was author and singer, gained a great commercial success, topping the Italian hit parade. In 1989 he also made his directorial debut with the film Vogliamoci troppo bene (Let's love too much) and took part in the Sanremo Music Festival with the song "Esatto!" ('Exactly!'), which obtained critical and commercial success. He later took part to three more editions of the Festival between 1990 and 1996.

In 1991, he took part to the musical L'Odissea, a satirical music show inspired from Homer's Odyssey, aired by Canale 5 and directed by Beppe Recchia. Salvi interpreted Telemachus and Polyphemus, while Andrea Roncato played Ulysses and pornographic actress Moana Pozzi played Penelope. The same year Salvi starred in another satirical musical show, inspired by Alexandre Dumas's The Three Musketeers: I Tre Moschettieri, in which he played Athos.

On 1 March 1992, Francesco Salvi appeared in comics in the comic magazine Topolino, issue 1982, in the comic strip Pippo e l'ospite d'onore ("Goofy and the guest star"), which Salvi co-authored. In the same year, he hosted the Italia 1 television show La strana coppia ("The Odd Couple"), together with fellow Italian comedian Massimo Boldi.

During 1995 and 1996, Salvi worked with Disney for the radio program Radiotopogiro, aired by Rai Radio 2. He also took part in Antonio Ricci's satirical television show Striscia la notizia, both as host and as fake cultural correspondent.

In 1997, he voiced the title-character in the Rai animation series Lupo Alberto.

In 2001 Salvi played his first dramatic role in the film The Comeback, and was nominated for Silver Ribbon for best actor. From 2004 he started working in the successful television series Un medico in famiglia, in which he starred for three seasons.

In 2006, Francesco Salvi co-hosted the third edition of the reality show La Fattoria (Italian version of The Farm), set in Morocco. In the same year he starred in the television shows Suonare Stella and Comedy Club (where he taught comedy to Italian singer Syria) and had a significant role in the crime film 10th & Wolf.

In 2008, Salvi was the recipient of the "Penisola Sorrentina Arturo Esposito" Best Male Character Award.

Francesco Salvi is the most cited author in Gino Vignali and Michele Mozzati's comedy quotes anthology Anche le formiche nel loro piccolo si incazzano ("Ants also, for their humble part, lose patience").

== Filmography ==
=== Films ===
Year	Title	Role(s)	Notes
1971	Le inibizioni del dottor Gaudenzi, vedovo, col complesso della buonanima	Young boy	Cameo appearance
1978	Per vivere meglio, divertitevi con noi	Stableman	Segment: "Non si può spiegare, bisogna vederlo"
1979	Hunted City	Policeman	Cameo appearance
1980	Men or Not Men	Soldier	Cameo appearance
1981	Miracoloni	Giosuè	
1981	Fracchia la belva umana	Neuro	
1982	I'm Going to Live by Myself	Friend	Cameo appearance
1982	Sturmtruppen II: Tutti al fronte	Francesco	
1982	Attila flagello di Dio	Grippo	
1985	Joan Lui	TV Journalist	Cameo appearance
1989	Vogliamoci troppo bene	Matteo Zampini	Also writer and director
1997	Camera obscura	Prisoner	Short film
1999	All the Moron's Men	Relocation Man	Cameo appearance
2001	The Comeback	Mario Gibellini	Also writer
2003	Esercizi di magia	Condor	Short film
2003	The Tulse Luper Suitcases, Part 1: The Moab Story	Paul / Pierre	
2004	The Tulse Luper Suitcases, Part 2: Vaux to the Sea	Paul / Pierre	
2005	Never Again as Before	Enrico's father	
2006	10th & Wolf	Luciano Reggio	
2007	Il giorno, la notte. Poi l'alba	Francis of Assisi	
2009	Butterfly Zone: Il senso della farfalla	Mr. Chenier	
2012	Piazza Fontana: The Italian Conspiracy	Cornelio Rolandi	
2014	Stalker	Coach	
2017	The Music of Silence	Ettore	
2019	The Game Changers	Chirico Del Monte	

=== Television ===
Year	Title	Role(s)	Notes
1980	Un matrimonio in provincia	Mr. Crosio	Television movie
1985	Yesterday: Vacanze al mare	Paolo	2 episodes
1988	I ragazzi della 3ª C	Inspector Marino	Episode: "Gli evasi"
1991	L'Odissea	Telemachus	Television film
1997	I misteri di Cascina Vianello	Giacomo	Episode: "Quattro assi per una rapina"
1997	Tutti gli uomini sono uguali	Psychiatrist	2 episodes
1997–2002	Lupo Alberto	Lupo Alberto (voice)	104 episodes
1998	Lui & Lei	Italo Incerti	8 episodes
2001, 2018	Don Matteo	Luciano Viti	Episode: "Peso massimo"
2001, 2018	Don Matteo	Father Adelmo	Episode: "La notte dell'anima"
2002	Padri	Gigi Sergenti	Television film
2003	Una famiglia per caso	Mimmo	Television film
2003–2007	Un medico in famiglia	Augusto Torello	42 episodes
2004	Polizeiruf 110	Mr. Nobody	Episode: "Mein letzter Wille"
2005	L'amore non basta	Mario	Television film
2005	Nebbie e delitti	Inspector Bondan	Episode: "Bersaglio, l'oblio"
2005	Ricomincio da me	Andrea	2 episodes
2006	Bartali: The Iron Man	Eberardo Pavesi	Television film
2006	I figli strappati	Nonino	Television film
2007	Graffio di tigre	Uncle Piero	Television film
2007	Crimini	Samuele	Episode: "Ultima battuta"
2009	Bakhita	Father Antonio	Television film
2009	Nell'aria	Count Ruggeri	Television film
2009	Pane e libertà	Bruno Buozzi	Television film
2010	Saint Philip Neri: I Prefer Heaven	Persiano Rosa	Television film
2011–2017	Un passo dal cielo	Roccia Scotton	57 episodes
2012	Talent High School - Il sogno di Sofia	Sirio Perri	24 episodes
2014	Madre, aiutami	Vittorio	4 episodes
2015	La dama velata	Giovanni Staineri	11 episodes

== See also ==
- List of Italian comedians
