= Esatto! =

Single by Francesco Salvi

from the album Megasalvi
- B-side: "Universal Love"
- Released: 1989
- Length: 3:36
- Label: Mega Records, Five Record
- Songwriters: Francesco Salvi, Roberto Turatti, Mario Natale, Mauro Giuliani, Silvio Melloni

Francesco Salvi singles chronology
"C'è da spostare una macchina" (1988)	"Esatto!" (1989)	"Ti ricordi di me?" (1989)

Music video
- "Esatto!" on YouTube

"Esatto!" ("Exactly!") is a 1989 song by Francesco Salvi from his album Megasalvi.

== Overview ==
The song entered the main competition at the 39th edition of the Sanremo Music Festival, in which it ranked seventh. Described as a mixture of eurodisco and children's song, it features animal sounds reproduced using an electronic synthesizer. At the Sanremo Festival, Salvi performed the song accompanied by four dancers disguised as animals. La Repubblica praised the song and Salvi's performance, describing them as "a small revenge against the languid nonsense of many other songs, unleashing good humor which, in the imposing and sanctified festival setting, is still seen as transgressive and even a little sacrilegious".

The song turned to be a major commercial success, ranking first on the Italian hit parade and earning a gold disc for having sold over 100,000 copies within two weeks of its release.

== Track listing ==
No.	Title	Writer(s)	Length
1.	"Esatto!"	Francesco Salvi, Mario Natale, Roberto Turatti, Mauro Giuliani, Silvio Melloni	3:36
2.	"Universal Love"	Francesco Salvi, Roberto Turatti	3:59

== Charts ==
=== Weekly charts ===
Chart (1989)	Peak position
Italy (Musica e dischi)	1
Italy Airplay (Music & Media)	3
Switzerland (Schweizer Hitparade)	24
