= The Comeback (2001 film) =

2001 film by Franco Angeli

- Directed by: Franco Angeli
- Written by: Francesco Salvi; Franco Angeli
- Produced by: Paola Ermini
- Starring: Francesco Salvi
- Cinematography: Marcello Montarsi
- Edited by: Roberto Missiroli
- Music by: Stefano Arnaldi
- Release date: 2001
- Language: Italian

The Comeback (Italian: La rentrée) is a 2001 Italian independent drama film written and directed by Franco Angeli.

For his performance Francesco Salvi was nominated for Silver Ribbon for best actor, while Angeli was nominated for Silver Ribbon for best new director.

== Cast ==
- Francesco Salvi as Mario Gibellini
- Livia Bonifazi as Teresa
- Nando Gazzolo as Chiodi
- Néstor Garay as Denti
- Flavio Insinna as Bolognesi
- Pasquale Anselmo as Ciamboli
- Franco Di Francescantonio as Franchino

== See also ==
- List of Italian films of 2001
