= List of Don Matteo episodes =

Don Matteo is an Italian television series.

== Series overview ==
Season	Episodes	Premiere	Finale
1	16	January 7, 2000	February 20, 2000
2	16	October 21, 2001	December 9, 2001
3	16	September 27, 2002	November 15, 2002
4	24	February 19, 2004	May 6, 2004
5	24	February 1, 2006	April 27, 2006
6	24	January 17, 2008	April 10, 2008
7	24	September 10, 2009	November 26, 2009
8	24	September 15, 2011	December 8, 2011
9	26	January 9, 2014	April 10, 2014
10	26	January 7, 2016	April 14, 2016
11	25	January 11, 2018	April 19, 2018
12	10	January 9, 2020	March 19, 2020
13	10	March 31, 2022	May 26, 2022
14	10	October 17, 2024	December 19, 2024
15	10	January 8, 2026	March 19, 2026

== Episodes ==
=== Season 1 (2000) ===
No. overall	Italian title	English title	Directed by	Original release date
1	"Lo straniero"	"The Foreign Man"	Enrico Oldoini	January 7, 2000
2	"Una banale operazione"	"Trivial Operation"	Enrico Oldoini	January 7, 2000
3	"Il coraggio di parlare"	"The Courage to Speak"	Enrico Oldoini	January 14, 2000
4	"Anna"	"Anna"	Enrico Oldoini	January 14, 2000
5	"La strategia dello scorpione"	"The Strategy of the Scorpion"	Enrico Oldoini	January 21, 2000
6	"Questione di fiuto"	"Question of Sniffing"	Enrico Oldoini	January 21, 2000
7	"La rosa antica"	"The Old Rose"	Enrico Oldoini	January 28, 2000
8	"Il piccolo angelo"	"The Little Angel"	Enrico Oldoini	January 28, 2000
9	"In attesa di giudizio"	"Awaiting Trial"	Enrico Oldoini	February 4, 2000
10	"Il ricatto"	"Blackmail"	Enrico Oldoini	February 4, 2000
11	"L'attore"	"The Actor"	Enrico Oldoini	February 11, 2000
12	"Stato di ebbrezza"	"Drunk"	Enrico Oldoini	February 11, 2000
13	"Delitto accademico"	"Academic Crime"	Enrico Oldoini	February 18, 2000
14	"Amore senza età"	"Ageless Love"	Enrico Oldoini	February 18, 2000
15	"Il fuoco della passione"	"The Fire of the Passion"	Enrico Oldoini	February 20, 2000
16	"La mela marcia"	"The Bad Apple"	Enrico Oldoini	February 20, 2000

=== Season 2 (2001) ===
No. overall	Italian title	English title	Directed by	Original release date
1	"La mela avvelenata"	"The Poisoned Apple"	Leone Pompucci	October 21, 2001
2	"Il marchio sulla pelle"	"Branded Skin"	Leone Pompucci	October 21, 2001
3	"Cuore di ghiaccio"	"Heart of Ice"	Leone Pompucci	October 28, 2001
4	"Il mago"	"The Magician"	Andrea Barzini	October 28, 2001
5	"Cinque astici"	"Five Lobsters"	Andrea Barzini	November 4, 2001
6	"Un uomo onesto"	"Honest Man"	Leone Pompucci	November 4, 2001
7	"Il torpedone"	"The Coach Travel"	Leone Pompucci	November 11, 2001
8	"Peso massimo"	"Maximum Weight"	Leone Pompucci	November 11, 2001
9	"Mossa d'azzardo"	"Move Gambling"	Andrea Barzini	November 18, 2001
10	"Moglie e buoi dei paesi tuoi"	"Wife and Oxen of Your Countries"	Andrea Barzini	November 18, 2001
11	"La banda"	"The Band"	Andrea Barzini	November 25, 2001
12	"Il morso del serpente"	"The Bite of the Snake"	Leone Pompucci	November 25, 2001
13	"Questione di fegato"	"Etruscan Tomb"	Andrea Barzini	December 2, 2001
14	"Scherzare col fuoco"	"Play With the Fire"	Leone Pompucci	December 2, 2001
15	"Fuori gioco"	"Out Game"	Andrea Barzini	December 9, 2001
16	"La confessione"	"The Confession"	Andrea Barzini	December 9, 2001

=== Season 3 (2002) ===
No. overall	Italian title	English title	Directed by	Original release date
1	"I segreti del cuore"	"The Secrets of the Heart"	Enrico Oldoini	September 27, 2002
2	"In amore non è mai troppo tardi"	"In Love Is Never Too Late"	Leone Pompucci	September 27, 2002
3	"Scandalo in città"	"Scandal in the City"	Enrico Oldoini	October 4, 2002
4	"Sequestro di persona"	"Seizure of Person"	Andrea Barzini	October 4, 2002
5	"Il passato ritorna"	"The Past Return"	Enrico Oldoini	October 11, 2002
6	"Paura in palcoscenico"	"Stage Fright"	Andrea Barzini	October 11, 2002
7	"Beauty Farm"	"Beauty Farm"	Andrea Barzini	October 18, 2002
8	"L'incarico"	"The Assignment"	Andrea Barzini	October 18, 2002
9	"Bellissima"	"Beautiful"	Enrico Oldoini	October 25, 2002
10	"Il mistero del convento"	"The Mystery of the Convent"	Leone Pompucci	October 25, 2002
11	"Il testimone"	"The Witness"	Andrea Barzini	November 1, 2002
12	"Natalina innamorata"	"Natalina Is In Love"	Leone Pompucci	November 1, 2002
13	"Tre matrimoni e un...Babbo Natale"	"Three Weddings and...a Santa Claus"	Andrea Barzini	November 8, 2002
14	"Il re degli scacchi"	"The King of Chess"	Andrea Barzini	November 8, 2002
15	"La lettera anonima"	"The Anonymous Letter"	Leone Pompucci	November 15, 2002
16	"Il volo"	"The Flight"	Andrea Barzini	November 15, 2002

=== Season 4 (2004) ===
No. overall	Italian title	English title	Directed by	Original release date
1	"Campagna elettorale"	"Election Campaign"	Andrea Barzini	February 19, 2004
2	"Delitto in biblioteca"	"Crime in the Library"	Giulio Base	February 19, 2004
3	"Mio padre è stato in carcere"	"My Father Was In Prison"	Giulio Base	February 26, 2004
4	"Debito per la vita"	"Debt for Life"	Giulio Base	February 26, 2004
5	"Gara di ballo"	"Dance Competition"	Giulio Base	March 4, 2004
6	"Morte all'alba"	"Death at Dawn"	Andrea Barzini	March 4, 2004
7	"Comma 23"	"Subparagraph 23"	Andrea Barzini	March 11, 2004
8	"Il calice avvelenato"	"The Poisoned Chalice"	Giulio Base	March 11, 2004
9	"La valigia"	"The Suitcase"	Andrea Barzini	March 18, 2004
10	"L'amore rubato"	"The Stolen Love"	Giulio Base	March 18, 2004
11	"I volteggi del cuore"	"The Vaulting of the Heart"	Giulio Base	March 25, 2004
12	"Delitto in diretta"	"Murder in Direct"	Andrea Barzini	March 25, 2004
13	"Indagine riservata"	"Private Investigation"	Andrea Barzini	April 1, 2004
14	"L'estraneo"	"The Stranger"	Giulio Base	April 1, 2004
15	"Misteri e bugie"	"Secrets and Lies"	Andrea Barzini	April 8, 2004
16	"Dietro il sipario"	"Behind the Curtain"	Andrea Barzini	April 8, 2004
17	"Merce preziosa"	"Precious Merchandise"	Andrea Barzini	April 15, 2004
18	"Il dono"	"The Gift"	Andrea Barzini	April 15, 2004
19	"Il sospetto"	"The Suspect"	Andrea Barzini	April 22, 2004
20	"La legge del caso"	"The Law of the Case"	Andrea Barzini	April 22, 2004
21	"Cuori solitari"	"Lonely Hearts"	Giulio Base	April 29, 2004
22	"Vacche grasse, vacche magre"	"Fat Cows, Lean Cows"	Giulio Base	April 29, 2004
23	"Il delitto del biberon"	"The Murder of the Baby Bottles"	Giulio Base	May 6, 2004
24	"Tre spari nel buio"	"Three Shots in the Dark"	Giulio Base	May 6, 2004

=== Season 5 (2006) ===
No. overall	Italian title	English title	Directed by	Original release date
1	"I conti col passato"	"The Accounts With the Past"	Elisabetta Marchetti	February 1, 2006
2	"Tarocchi di sangue"	"Tarot of Blood"	Giulio Base	February 1, 2006
3	"Al chiaro di luna"	"By Moon Light"	Elisabetta Marchetti	February 2, 2006
4	"Falso d'autore"	"False Copyright"	Giulio Base	February 2, 2006
5	"Ultimo enigma"	"Last Enigma"	Giulio Base	February 9, 2006
6	"Turista inglese"	"English Tourist"	Elisabetta Marchetti	February 9, 2006
7	"Legittima difesa"	"Self-Defense"	Giulio Base	February 16, 2006
8	"La forza del sorriso"	"The Force of Smile"	Giulio Base	February 16, 2006
9	"Ultima preda"	"Last Prey"	Giulio Base	February 23, 2006
10	"Una domenica tranquilla"	"A Quiet Sunday"	Elisabetta Marchetti	February 23, 2006
11	"Errore umano"	"Human Error"	Giulio Base	March 9, 2006
12	"Sogno spezzato"	"Broken Dream"	Elisabetta Marchetti	March 9, 2006
13	"Il ballo delle debuttanti"	"The Dance of Debutants"	Elisabetta Marchetti	March 16, 2006
14	"Acque avvelenate"	"Poisoned Waters"	Giulio Base	March 16, 2006
15	"Caduta dal cielo"	"Fall From the Sky"	Carmine Elia	March 23, 2006
16	"Sogni e bisogni"	"Dreams and Needs"	Elisabetta Marchetti	March 23, 2006
17	"Vuoto di meoria"	"Memory Empty"	Carmine Elia	March 30, 2006
18	"Panni sporchi"	"Dirty Cloth"	Elisabetta Marchetti	March 30, 2006
19	"Arabesque"	"Arabesque"	Carmine Elia	April 6, 2006
20	"Cavallo vincente"	"Winning Horse"	Carmine Elia	April 13, 2006
21	"Giudizio universale"	"Universal Judgment"	Elisabetta Marchetti	April 13, 2006
22	"Le elezioni del cuore"	"The Elections of the Heart"	Elisabetta Marchetti	April 20, 2006
23	"La posta in gioco"	"Mail in the Game"	Elisabetta Marchetti	April 20, 2006
24	"Falsa partenza"	"False Start"	Elisabetta Marchetti	April 27, 2006

=== Season 6 (2008) ===
No. overall	Italian title	English title	Directed by	Original release date
1	"Bentornato don Matteo"	"Welcome Back Don Matteo"	Elisabetta Marchetti	January 17, 2008
2	"Profumo di caffè"	"The Aroma of Coffee"	Elisabetta Marchetti	January 17, 2008
3	"Cioccolata"	"Chocolate"	Elisabetta Marchetti	January 24, 2008
4	"La stanza di un angelo"	"An Angel's Room"	Elisabetta Marchetti	January 24, 2008
5	"La minicubista"	"Underage Dancers"	Fabrizio Costa	January 31, 2008
6	"Morte di un cantastorie"	"Death of a Storyteller"	Elisabetta Marchetti	January 31, 2008
7	"Il ritmo dei pedali"	"The Rhythm of Pedals"	Fabrizio Costa	February 7, 2008
8	"Il caso del cane scomparso a mezzogiorno"	"The Strange Case of the Dog Who Disappeared at Noon"	Elisabetta Marchetti	February 7, 2008
9	"Un tocco di fard"	"A Touch of Rouge"	Fabrizio Costa	February 14, 2008
10	"Trattamento di benessere"	"Well-being Treatments"	Fabrizio Costa	February 14, 2008
11	"Uno spirito inquieto"	"A Restless Spirit"	Fabrizio Costa	February 21, 2008
12	"I segreti degli altri"	"Unexpected Secrets"	Elisabetta Marchetti	February 21, 2008
13	"Francesca e il lupo"	"Francesca and the Wolf"	Fabrizio Costa	March 6, 2008
14	"La giostra dei desideri"	"The Carousel"	Fabrizio Costa	March 6, 2008
15	"Io ti salverò"	"I'll Save You"	Fabrizio Costa	March 13, 2008
16	"Un San Valentino per Natalina"	"A Valentine for Natalina"	Giulio Base and Elisabetta Marchetti	March 13, 2008
17	"Un sogno rubato"	"A Stolen Dream"	Giulio Base	March 20, 2008
18	"Incontri ravvinati"	"Frequent Encounters"	Elisabetta Marchetti	March 20, 2008
19	"Il fratello di Natalina"	"Natalina's Brother"	Giulio Base	March 27, 2008
20	"Crisi sentimentale"	"Sentimental Crisis"	Giulio Base	March 27, 2008
21	"Una buona annata"	"A Good Year"	Elisabetta Marchetti	April 3, 2008
22	"Il tesoro di Orfeo"	"The Treasure of Orpheus"	Giulio Base	April 3, 2008
23	"Bravi ragazzi"	"The Good Boys"	Elisabetta Marchetti	April 10, 2008
24	"Una dura prova per don Matteo"	"A Challenge For Don Matteo"	Elisabetta Marchetti	April 10, 2008

=== Season 7 (2009) ===
No. overall	Italian title	English title	Directed by	Original release date
1	"L'ultimo salto"	"The Last Jump"	Ludovico Gasparini	September 10, 2009
2	"Il mestiere di crescere"	"The Art of Growing "	Ludovico Gasparini	September 10, 2009
3	"Orma d'orso"	"Bear Tracks"	Ludovico Gasparini	September 17, 2009
4	"La ragazza senza nome"	"The Girl Without a Name"	Giulio Base	September 17, 2009
5	"Non è uno scherzo"	"Not a Joke"	Giulio Base	September 24, 2009
6	"Numeri primi"	"Prime Numbers"	Ludovico Gasparini	September 24, 2009
7	"Dietro le mura del convento"	"Behind Convent Walls"	Ludovico Gasparini	October 1, 2009
8	"Caro papà"	"Dear Dad"	Ludovico Gasparini	October 1, 2009
9	"Questione d'onore"	"A Question of Honor"	Ludovico Gasparini	October 8, 2009
10	"Mai dire trenta"	"Never Say Thirty"	Giulio Base	October 8, 2009
11	"L'anello"	"The Ring"	Giulio Base	October 15, 2009
12	"Chi ha ucciso Toro Seduto?"	"Who Killed the Sitting Bull?"	Giulio Base	October 15, 2009
13	"Mete ambiziose"	"Ambitious Destinations"	Ludovico Gasparini	October 22, 2009
14	"L'anniversario"	"The Anniversary"	Ludovico Gasparini	October 22, 2009
15	"Balla con me"	"Dance With Me"	Giulio Base	October 29, 2009
16	"Corsa contro il tempo"	"Race Against Time"	Giulio Base	October 29, 2009
17	"La cattiva strada"	"A Bad Turn"	Giulio Base	November 5, 2009
18	"Amabile chiacchierata"	"A Friendly Chat"	Giulio Base	November 5, 2009
19	"Perfetta"	"Perfect"	Giulio Base	November 12, 2009
20	"Tango"	"Tango"	Giulio Base	November 12, 2009
21	"Perchè non lo diciamo a papà?"	"Why Not Tell Daddy?"	Giulio Base	November 19, 2009
22	"Sai chi viene a cena?"	"Look Who's Coming For Dinner?"	Giulio Base	November 19, 2009
23	"Una margherita per Natalina"	"A Daisy For Natalina"	Elisabatta Marchetti	November 26, 2009
24	"Ad ogni costo"	"Whatever It Takes"	Elisabetta Marchetti	November 26, 2009

=== Season 8 (2011) ===
No. overall	Italian title	English title	Directed by	Original release date
1	"Era mia figlia"	"It Was My Daughter"	Giulio Base	September 15, 2011
2	"Rave party"	"Rave Party"	Giulio Base	September 15, 2011
3	"Prova d'amore"	"Proof of Love"	Giulio Base	September 22, 2011
4	"L'uomo che sapeva volare"	"The Man Who Knew How To Fly"	Giulio Base	September 22, 2011
5	"Il ritorno"	"Her Return"	Giulio Base	September 29, 2011
6	"Tre nipoti e una tata"	"Three Grandchildren and One Nanny"	Giulio Base	September 29, 2011
7	"Severino innamorato"	"Severino In Love"	Giulio Base	October 6, 2011
8	"Un'altra vita"	"Another Life"	Giulio Base	October 6, 2011
9	"Sposami"	"Marry Me"	Carmine Elia	October 13, 2011
10	"Tiro mancino"	"Deception"	Carmine Elia	October 13, 2011
11	"Il suocero ha sempre ragione"	"The Father-In-Law Is Always Right"	Carmine Elia	October 20, 2011
12	"I segreti di Gubbio"	"The Secrets of Gubbio"	Carmine Elia	October 20, 2011
13	"Scelta di vita"	"Life Choices"	Carmine Elia	October 27, 2011
14	"Generazione Y"	"Generation Y"	Carmine Elia	October 27, 2011
15	"Il giorno più bello"	"The Most Beautiful Day"	Carmine Elia	November 3, 2011
16	"La bambina del miracolo"	"The Miracle Child"	Carmine Elia	November 3, 2011
17	"Vecchie amiche"	"Old Friends"	Fernando Muraca	November 10, 2011
18	"Il bambino conteso"	"The Sought-after Child"	Fernando Muraca	November 10, 2011
19	"L'ombra del sospetto"	"A Shadow of Suspicion"	Fernando Muraca	November 17, 2011
20	"Indagine su una figlia"	"The Investigation of a Daughter"	Fernando Muraca	November 17, 2011
21	"L'amore non basta"	"Love Is Not Enough"	Salvatore Basile	November 24, 2011
22	"Tradimenti"	"Betrayal"	Salvatore Basile	December 1, 2011
23	"Tutto è perduto"	"All Is Lost"	Salvatore Basile	December 1, 2011
24	"Don Matteo sotto accusa"	"Don Matteo Under Accusation"	Salvatore Basile	December 8, 2011

=== Season 9 (2014) ===
No. overall	Italian title	English title	Directed by	Original release date
1	"Un nuovo inizio"	"A New Beginning"	Monica Vullo	January 9, 2014
2	"La seconda moglie"	"The Second Wife"	Monica Vullo	January 9, 2014
3	"Testimone d'accusa"	"The Prosecutor's Witness"	Monica Vullo	January 16, 2014
4	"Prova d'amore"	"Love Put to the Test"	Monica Vullo	January 16, 2014
5	"Il record della vita"	"A Record for Life"	Monica Vullo	January 23, 2014
6	"Fuori dal mondo"	"Out of this World"	Monica Vullo	January 23, 2014
7	"Il coraggio di una figlia"	"A Daughter's Courage"	Monica Vullo	January 30, 2014
8	"Una vita sul filo"	"Hanging On by a Thread"	Monica Vullo	January 30, 2014
9	"L'ultimo colpo"	"The Final Blow"	Monica Vullo	February 6, 2014
10	"Cyberbulli"	"Cyberbully"	Luca Ribuoli	February 6, 2014
11	"Vicini e incredibilmente lontani"	"Near and Far"	Luca Ribuoli	February 13, 2014
12	"Scommessa perdente"	"A Losing Bet"	Luca Ribuoli	February 13, 2014
13	"Il prezzo dell'amore"	"The Price of Love"	Luca Ribuoli	February 27, 2014
14	"La straniera"	"The Foreigner"	Luca Ribuoli	February 27, 2014
15	"Questione di priorità"	"A Question of Priority"	Jan Michelini	March 6, 2014
16	"La scelta"	"A Choice"	Luca Ribuoli	March 6, 2014
17	"Sotto accusa"	"Under Attack"	Jan Michelini	March 13, 2014
18	"La veggente"	"The Fortune Teller"	Jan Michelini	March 13, 2014
19	"Il bambino conteso"	"Custody Battles"	Jan Michelini	March 20, 2014
20	"Mio figlio"	"My Son"	Jan Michelini	March 20, 2014
21	"Affari di famiglia"	"Family Business"	Monica Vullo	March 27, 2014
22	"Niente da perdere"	"Nothing to Lose"	Monica Vullo	March 27, 2014
23	"Una favola vera"	"A Real Fairy Tale"	Monica Vullo	April 3, 2014
24	"Il ritorno di Alma"	"Alma's Return"	Monica Vullo	April 3, 2014
25	"Vecchi ricordi"	"Old Memories"	Monica Vullo	April 10, 2014
26	"Addio Natalina!"	"Goodbye Natalina!"	Monica Vullo	April 10, 2014

=== Season 10 (2016) ===
No. overall	Italian title	English title	Directed by	Original release date
1	"La colpa"	"Blame"	Jan Maria Michelini	January 7, 2016
2	"Colpi proibiti"	"Prohibited shots"	Jan Maria Michelini	January 7, 2016
3	"Senza via d'uscita"	"Without exit"	Jan Maria Michelini	January 14, 2016
4	"Distanza di sicurezza"	"Safety distance"	Jan Maria Michelini	January 14, 2016
5	"Pensavo fosse amore"	"I thought it was love"	Jan Maria Michelini	January 21, 2016
6	"Fuori dal gioco"	"Out of the Game"	Jan Maria Michelini	January 21, 2016
7	"Non è colpa delle stelle"	"Don't Blame the Stars"	Jan Maria Michelini	January 28, 2016
8	"Medical Market"	"Medical Market"	Jan Maria Michelini	January 28, 2016
9	"L'amore a chilometro zero"	"Locally Sourced Love"	Jan Maria Michelini	February 4, 2016
10	"L'uomo dei carrelli"	"The Shopping Cart Man"	Jan Maria Michelini	February 4, 2016
11	"E tu quanto vali?"	"And How Much Are You Worth?"	Jan Maria Michelini	February 18, 2016
12	"Liberi dal male"	"Delivered From Evil	Jan Maria Michelini	February 18, 2016
13	"Piccole stelle"	"Little Stars"	Jan Maria Michelini	February 25, 2016
14	"CAM-MOM"	"Webcam Mom"	Jan Maria Michelini	February 25, 2016
15	"La promessa"	"The Promise"	Jan Maria Michelini	March 3, 2016
16	"La vita è un film"	"Life is a Movie"	Jan Maria Michelini	March 3, 2016
17	"L'amico ritrovato"	"The Rediscovered Friend"	Jan Maria Michelini	March 10, 2016
18	"Le due madri"	"The Two Mothers"	Jan Maria Michelini	March 10, 2016
19	"La diva"	"The Diva"	Jan Maria Michelini	March 17, 2016
20	"L'inganno"	"The Scam"	Jan Maria Michelini	March 17, 2016
21	"L'ultimo ricordo"	"The Last Memory"	Jan Maria Michelini	March 31, 2016
22	"Resurrezione"	"Resurrection"	Jan Maria Michelini	March 31, 2016
23	"Il contagio"	"The Infection"	Jan Maria Michelini	April 7, 2016
24	"Ultimo giro di giostra"	"The Last Turn of the Carousel"	Jan Maria Michelini	April 7, 2016
25	"La fuga"	"The Escape"	Jan Maria Michelini	April 14, 2016
26	"Nei secoli fedele"	"Nei Secoli Fedele"	Jan Maria Michelini	April 14, 2016

=== Season 11 (2018) ===
No. overall	Italian title	English title	Directed by	Original release date
1	"L'errore più bello"	The Most Beautiful Mistake"	Jan Maria Michelini	January 11, 2018
2	"Scene da un matrimonio"	"Scenes from a Wedding"	Jan Maria Michelini	January 11, 2018
3	"Salvazione"	"Salvation"	Jan Maria Michelini	January 18, 2018
4	"Per il loro bene"	"For Their Own Good"	Jan Maria Michelini	January 18, 2018
5	"La vera ricchezza"	"True Wealth"	Jan Maria Michelini	January 25, 2018
6	"Il prezzo del talento"	"The Price of Talent"	Jan Maria Michelini	January 25, 2018
7	"L'amore sbagliato"	"Mismatched Love"	Jan Maria Michelini	February 1, 2018
8	"Avrò cura di te"	"I'll Take Care of You"	Jan Maria Michelini	February 1, 2018
9	"La mia giustizia"	"My Justice"	Jan Maria Michelini	February 15, 2018
10	"La notte dell'anima"	"The Night of the Soul"	Jan Maria Michelini	February 15, 2018
11	"Ancora bambina"	"Still a Child"	Jan Maria Michelini	February 22, 2018
12	"Scegli me!"	"Choose Me!"	Jan Maria Michelini	February 22, 2018
13	"Pena d'amore"	"Pain of Love"	Jan Maria Michelini	March 1, 2018
14	"Una famiglia normale"	"A Normal Family"	Jan Maria Michelini	March 1, 2018
15	"Una questione personale"	"A Personal Matter"	Jan Maria Michelini	March 8, 2018
16	"Una di quelle"	"One of Those"	Jan Maria Michelini	March 8, 2018
17	"Genitori e figli"	"Parents and Children"	Jan Maria Michelini	March 15, 2018
18	"Don Matteo sotto tiro"	"Don Matteo Under Fire"	Jan Maria Michelini	March 15, 2018
19	"Dimmi chi sei"	"Tell Me Who You Are"	Jan Maria Michelini	March 22, 2018
20	"Sola andata"	"One Way"	Jan Maria Michelini	March 22, 2018
21	"La crepa"	"The Crack"	Jan Maria Michelini	March 29, 2018
22	"Premonizioni"	"Premonitions"	Jan Maria Michelini	April 5, 2018
23	"Tutta la vita"	"For Life"	Jan Maria Michelini	April 12, 2018
24	"Il potere del perdono"	"The Power of Forgiveness"	Jan Maria Michelini	April 12, 2018
25	"Il bambino di Natale"	"The Christmas Baby"	Jan Maria Michelini	April 19, 2018

=== Season 12 (2020) ===
No. overall	Italian title	English title	Directed by	Original release date
1	"Non avrai altro Dio all'infuori di me"	"Thou shalt have no other gods"	Raffaele Androsiglio	January 9, 2020
2	"Non nominare il nome di Dio invano"	"Not take the Lord's name in vain"	Raffaele Androsiglio	January 16, 2020
3	"Ricordati di santificare le feste"	"Remember the sabbath day"	Raffaele Androsiglio	January 23, 2020
4	"Onora il padre e la madre"	"Honour thy father and mother"	Raffaele Androsiglio	January 30, 2020
5	"Non uccidere"	"Thou shalt not kill"	Raffaele Androsiglio	February 20, 2020
6	"Non commettere adulterio"	"Thou shalt not commit adultery"	Unknown	February 27, 2020
7	"Non rubare"	"Thou shalt not steal"	Unknown	March 3, 2020
8	"Non dire falsa testimonianza"	"Thou shalt not bear false witness"	Unknown	March 5, 2020
9	"Non desiderare la donna d'altri"	"Thou shalt not covet your neighbor's wife"	Unknown	March 12, 2020
10	"Non desiderare la roba d'altri"	"Thou shalt not cover your neighbor's house"	Unknown	March 19, 2020

=== Season 13 (2022) ===
No. overall	Italian title	English title	Directed by	Original release date
1	"Il giorno perfetto"	TBA	Francesco Vicario	March 31, 2022
2	"Amore e rabbia"	TBA	Luca Brignone	April 7, 2022
3	"Il sacrificio della regina"	TBA	Luca Brignone	April 14, 2022
4	"Cosí vicini, cosí lontani"	TBA	Unknown	April 21, 2022
5	"L'amico ritrovato"	TBA	Unknown	April 28, 2022
6	"L'innocente"	TBA	Unknown	May 5, 2022
7	"Le colpe degli altri"	TBA	Unknown	May 17, 2022
8	"Ma è l'amore che fa la famiglia o la famiglia che fa l'amore?"	TBA	Unknown	May 19, 2022
9	"Il coraggio di credere"	TBA	Unknown	May 24, 2022
10	"Dimenticando Matteo"	TBA	Unknown	May 26, 2022
