= Alice Mangione (comedian) =

Italian actress and comedian (born 1984)

- Born: 3 August 1984 (age 42); Bergamo, Lombardy, Italy
- Occupations: Comedian, actress
- Years active: 2004–present

Alice Mangione (born 3 August 1984) is an Italian actress and comedian.

== Life and career ==
Mangione was born in Bergamo in 1984. She made her television debut in 2004 on Mai dire martedì in Maccio Capatonda's skits. In the following years, she became active in Italian television comedy, appearing in entertainment and satirical programmes such as La prova dell'otto, Glob, Colorado and Comedy Central News. Magione expanded her work into cinema with roles in comedy films including Oggi sposi (2009) and A Boyfriend for My Wife (2014). Alongside her film work, she continued to appear regularly on television, taking part in programmes such as Quelli degli anni 80 on DeeJay TV and acting in television drama, notably portraying Annabella Copparoni in the Canale 5 miniseries Anima gemella.

In 2016, together with Gianmarco Pozzoli, Mangione co-founded The Pozzolis Family, a multimedia project and live show centred on family life. In 2022, she was a contestant on the second season of LOL – Chi ride è fuori, streamed on Amazon Prime Video. In 2024, she appeared in the film Una terapia di gruppo, directed by Paolo Costella, and made her debut as a stand-up comedian with the theatre show Cruda e nuda, which continued in 2025 with Cruda e nuda: Lato B. During the same period, she performed in Matilda the Musical at the Teatro Sistina in Rome.

== Personal life ==
Mangione began a relationship with comedian Gianmarco Pozzoli in 2013. They married in May 2019 and have two children, Giosuè and Olivia Tosca. In July 2025, the couple publicly announced that they had separated the previous year.

== Filmography ==
Film
| Year | Title | Role | Notes |
|---|---|---|---|
| 2009 | Oggi sposi | Venetian manicurist | |
| 2014 | A Boyfriend for My Wife | Anna | |
| 2024 | Una terapia di gruppo | Stefania | |

Television
| Year | Title | Role | Notes |
|---|---|---|---|
| 2006–2007 | Intralci | Brut | Main role |
| 2007 | La strana coppia | | Episode 1x01 |
| 2011 | Distretto di Polizia | Rescuer of the injured girl | Episode 11x01 |
| 2015 | One Step from Heaven | Fanny | Episode 3x19 |
| 2017 | One Step from Heaven | Antonella Fabricetti | Recurring role (season 4) |
| 2023 | Anima gemella | Annabella Copparoni | Main role |
