= 10th & Wolf =

- Film poster
- Directed by: Robert Moresco
- Written by: Robert Moresco; Allan Steele
- Produced by: Suzanne DeLaurentiis; Leo Rossi; Joe Murphy
- Starring: James Marsden; Giovanni Ribisi; Brad Renfro; Piper Perabo; Dash Mihok; Lesley Ann Warren; Dennis Hopper; Brian Dennehy; Francesco Salvi; Val Kilmer
- Cinematography: Alex Nepomniaschy
- Edited by: Harvey Rosenstock
- Music by: Aaron Zigman
- Distributed by: THINKFilm
- Release dates: April 21, 2006 (PBIFF); August 18, 2006 (United States)
- Running time: 110 minutes
- Country: United States
- Language: English
- Budget: $8 million
- Box office: $143,451

10th & Wolf is a 2006 film about the Philadelphia crime family, directed by Robert Moresco. It is based on an actual mob war in South Philadelphia. The movie stars James Marsden, Giovanni Ribisi and Brad Renfro, and features appearances by Dennis Hopper, Val Kilmer, Piper Perabo, Lesley Ann Warren, Tommy Lee, Francesco Salvi and Brian Dennehy.

10th & Wolf was the last film starring Renfro to be released before his death by overdose in January 2008.

== Synopsis ==
Tommy is the son of a Mafia hitman, who, after his father is killed by a rival, moves with his younger brother to live with his aunt, uncle, and cousin in Philadelphia. As the sole member of his family who is not involved in crime, Tommy joins the Marines and is deployed in Operation Desert Storm. He becomes disillusioned, however, when Saddam Hussein is still in power. Disenchanted with military service, Tommy assaults an MP and steals a colonel's Jeep. Arrested when the jeep runs out of gas, the movie opens with Tommy in the brig at a U.S. Marine base.

An FBI agent (played by Dennehy) coerces Tommy into infiltrating the family business. The agent tells Tommy that he can protect his brother and cousin in return for evidence against the philadelphia mafia, which is trying to take over the heroin trade in Philadelphia. Tommy is instructed to wear a wire to record negotiations between his cousin and gang leader, Joey Marcucci, and Mafia boss Luciano Reggio.

Tommy tries to obtain incriminating evidence against Reggio while protecting his cousin and younger brother in their fledgling attempts to become "goodfellas". His efforts to strike a balance between his family loyalties, and the FBI's need for evidence, take up most of the film's bulk.

== Cast ==
- James Marsden as Tommy
- Giovanni Ribisi as Joey Merlino
- Brad Renfro as Vincent
- Piper Perabo as Brandy
- Dennis Hopper as Matty Matello
- Brian Dennehy as FBI Agent Horvath
- Lesley Ann Warren as Tina
- Leo Rossi as FBI Agent Thornton
- Dash Mihok as Junior
- Tommy Lee as Jimmy "Tattoo"
- Francesco Salvi as Luciano Reggio
- Val Kilmer as Murtha
- John Capodice as Sipio
- James Grimaldi as Ricky Jerkoff

== Production ==
The movie was billed as having been "inspired by a true story from the FBI agent known as 'Donnie Brasco'", referencing the 1997 film of that name, which was based on former agent Joseph D. Pistone's nonfiction book detailing his infiltration of the Mafia.

While 10th & Wolf is set in Philadelphia, it was filmed in Pittsburgh. Scenes were shot at Tom's Diner and Bloom Cigar Company on the South Side and at Hartwood Mansion.

== Reception ==
The film was panned by critics. It holds a 19% approval score on Rotten Tomatoes, with an average rating of 4/10, based on 27 reviews. Metacritic assigned the film a weighted average score of 36 out of 100, based on 10 critics, indicating "generally unfavorable" reviews.

=== Accolades ===
Award	Category	Nominee(s)	Result
Popoli e Religioni Terni Film Festival	Best Supporting Actor	Francesco Salvi	Won

== Home media ==
The film was released in DVD on July 9, 2007.
