= Francesco Paolo Maria Di Salvia =

Italian novelist and short story writer (born 1982)

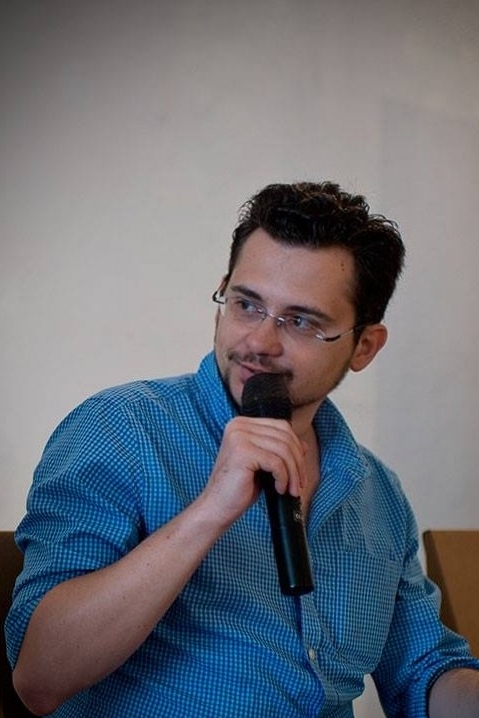
- Born: Francesco Paolo Maria Di Salvia; December 18, 1982; Salerno, Italy
- Education: Sapienza University of Rome (BA); Centro Sperimentale di Cinematografia (MA)
- Occupation: Novelist
- Writing career
- Period: 2010-
- Genre: Literary fiction

Francesco Paolo Maria Di Salvia (born December 18, 1982) is an Italian novelist and short story writer.

== Life and career ==
Born in Salerno in 1982, he studied arts and sciences of performing arts at the University of Rome "La Sapienza", writing a dissertation on Dissipatio H.G. by Guido Morselli, and then at the Centro Sperimentale di Cinematografia.

Di Salvia worked for many years as a producer, writer, and director in the Italian cinema and TV industry. He made his debut directing the short film Elezioni (2008), starring Francesco Pannofino, and then went on to direct La cura (2011), starring Marzia Tedeschi. As a screenwriter, in 2011, he co-wrote the film Balla con noi together with Massimiliano Bruno, Pier Paolo Piciarelli, and Cinzia Bomoll.

He debuted at 19 with a range of award-winning short stories. He won the XXXII Sports Short Story of the Year Award, promoted by the Italian National Olympic Committee, and the Subway Literature, both in 2002. Di Salvia published his first novel, La circostanza, in 2015. The novel won the Special Prize at the XXVII edition of the Italo Calvino Prize and the 2015 Giuseppe Berto Prize. The book was included both in the 2015 Quality Ranking by Corriere della Sera and in the 2000-2019 Narrative Quality Ranking by L'indiscreto.

== List of works ==
=== Novels ===
- La circostanza. Venice: Marsilio. 2015. LCCN 2015449050.

=== Short stories ===
- Diario probabile di certi strani accadimenti che di tanto in tanto..., Milan, Subway-Letteratura, 2002.

== Awards and nominations ==
- 2002 – Subway-Letteratura, for Diario probabile di certi strani accadimenti che di tanto in tanto...
- 2002 – Best Sports Short Story of the Year (Italian National Olympic Committee), for Leone Martini, terzino stagionale
- 2014 – Italo Calvino Prize, for La circostanza (Special Prize)
- 2015 – Giuseppe Berto Prize, for La circostanza

== Credits ==
- Elezioni (2008) (director and writer)
- La cura (2011) (director and writer)
- Balla con noi (2011) (writer)

== Notes ==
This article originated as a translation of this version of its counterpart in the Italian-language Wikipedia.
