= Un passo dal cielo =

- Italian poster
- Genre: Police procedural; Comedy-drama
- Created by: Enrico Oldoini
- Starring: Terence Hill; Enrico Ianiello; Gianmarco Pozzoli; Francesco Salvi; Katia Ricciarelli; Claudia Gaffuri; Gabriele Rossi; Gaia Bermani Amaral; Caterina Shulha; Giusy Buscemi; Tommaso Ramenghi; Rocío Muñoz Morales; Giovanni Scifoni; Daniele Liotti; Pilar Fogliati; Matteo Martari; Daniela Virgilio; Francesca Piroi; Pierangelo Menci; Beatrice Arnera; Giulia Fiume; Jenny De Nucci; Stefano Cassetti; Serena Autieri; Matteo Oscar Giuggioli; Serena Iansiti; Aurora Ruffino; Anna Dalton; Carlo Cecchi; Marco Rossetti; Leonardo Pazzagli; Giorgio Marchesi
- Composers: Pino Donaggio; Andrea Guerra
- Country of origin: Italy
- Original language: Italian
- No. of seasons: 7
- No. of episodes: 88

Production
- Producer: Luca Bernabei
- Running time: 50-55 minutes (2011-2017); 100 minutes (2019-)
- Production companies: Lux Vide; Rai Fiction

Original release
- Network: Rai 1
- Release: April 10, 2011 – present

Un passo dal cielo (English: One step from heaven) is an Italian mystery comedy-drama television series aired on Rai 1 and Rai HD and starring Terence Hill and Enrico Ianniello. It was the first television series produced and aired in high-definition on Rai HD.

== Premise ==
Pietro Thiene works for the Forestry Corps in the alpine village of San Candido. Joining him is police commissioner Vincenzo Nappi, who has just arrived in South Tyrol.

== Cast and characters ==
=== Main ===
- Terence Hill as Pietro Thiene (season 1-3)
- Enrico Ianniello as Vincenzo Nappi
- Gianmarco Pozzoli as Huber Fabricetti
- Francesco Salvi as Roccia Scotton (season 1-4)
- Katia Ricciarelli as Assunta Scotton (season 1-4)
- Claudia Gaffuri as Chiara Scotto (season 1-3; guest season 4)
- Gabriele Rossi as Giorgio Gualtieri (season 1-3)
- Gaia Bermani Amaral as Silvia Bussolati (season 1-2)
- Caterina Shulha as Natasha Volkova (season 3-4; recurring season 2)
- Giusy Buscemi as Manuela Nappi (season 3, 6-present)
- Tommaso Ramenghi as Tommaso Belli (season 3-4)
- Rocío Muñoz Morales as Eva Fernandez (season 3-5, 7-present; recurring season 6)
- Giovanni Scifoni as Karl Reuter (season 3)
- Daniele Liotti as Francesco Neri (season 4-6)
- Pilar Fogliati as Emma Giorgi (season 4-5; recurring season 6)
- Matteo Martari as Albert Kroess (season 4-5)
- Daniela Virgilio as Livia Sonzogni (season 4)
- Francesca Piroi as Zoe Sartori (season 4)
- Pierangelo Menci as Martino Bechis (season 4)
- Beatrice Arnera as Valeria Ferrante (season 5)
- Giulia Fiume as Adriana Ferrante (season 5)
- Jenny De Nucci as Isabella Ferrante (season 5-6)
- Stefano Cassetti as Bruno Moser (season 5)
- Serena Autieri as Ingrid Moser (season 5)
- Matteo Oscar Giuggioli as Klaus Moser (season 5)
- Serena Iansiti as Carolina Volpi (season 5)
- Aurora Ruffino as Dafne Meir (season 6)
- Anna Dalton as Elda (season 6)
- Carlo Cecchi as Christoph (season 6)
- Marco Rossetti as Nathan (season 7-present)
- Leonardo Pazzagli as Gregorio Masiero (season 7-present)
- Giorgio Marchesi as Luciano Paron (season 7-present)

=== Recurring ===
- Mauro Pirovano as The Mayor (season 1)
- Battina Giovannini as Claudia Gualtieri (season 1)
- Valentina D'Agostino as Marcella (season 1)
- Catrinel Menghia as Anya (season 2)
- Magdalena Grochowska as Emma Voronina (season 2)
- Raniero Monaco di Lapio as Tobias (season 2)
- Miriam Leone as Astrid (season 2)
- Alice Bellagamba as Miriam (season 2)
- Alan Cappelli Goetz as Marco (season 2)
- Daniel Vivian as Nikolaj Yelisev (season 2)
- Eleonora Sergio (season 2) and Alice Mangione (season 4) as Antonella Fabricetti
- Fabio Fulco as Federico Ruffo (season 3)
- Alice Torriani as Cristina Fabricetti (season 4)
- Cristian Popa as Eugenij Sr. (season 4)
- Cristina Marino as Anna Hofer (season 4)
- Alberto Giusta as Anna's father (season 4)
- Valentina Tomada as Anna's mother (season 4)
- Fedez as himself (season 4)
- Luca Fiamenghi as Stephen Berger (season 4)
- Francesco Castiglione as Gunther (season 4; guest season 5)
- Davide Paganini as Carlo Cesarin (season 5)
- Sinja Dieks as Elena Salvi (season 5)
- Leonardo Trevisan as Leonardo Sozogni (season 5)
- Luca Chikovani as Enrico Costa (season 6)
- Filippo De Carli as Giorgio (season 6)
- Flavio Furno as Antonio (season 6)
- Fabio Ghidoni as Moritz (season 6)
- Giulia Vecchio as Adele (season 7)

== Episodes ==
Season	Episodes	Premiere	Finale
1	12	April 10, 2011	May 17, 2011
2	14	October 14, 2012	November 29, 2012
3	18	January 8, 2015	March 16, 2015
4	18	January 17, 2017	March 21, 2017
5	10	September 12, 2019	November 14, 2019
6	8	April 1, 2021	May 20, 2021
7	8	March 30, 2023	May 8, 2023
8	6	January 9, 2025	February 20, 2025

=== Season 1 (2011) ===
No. in series	Italian title	English title	Directed by	Original release date
1	"Lo spirito del lupo"	The Spirit of the Wolf	Enrico Oldoini	April 10, 2011
The head of the forestry police, Pietro, must help the newly arrived Commissioner Vincenzo Nappi solve the murder of a girl, which seems to be the fault of a wolf. Not used to life in the small mountain village of San Candido, the new commissioner is not happy to be a guest in the forestry office, much less to share his accommodation with the veterinarian Silvia Bussolati, to whom he has an instant attraction.
2	"Il fantasma del mulino"	Ghost of the Mill	Enrico Oldoini	April 10, 2011
In San Candido, there is an old local legend of the ghost of a child who wanders through the forest. When a local elder with a drinking habit says he saw him, the superstitious villagers believe the ghost is responsible for the abduction of a local child, the son of building contractors. Elsewhere, a young man called Giorgio arrives in the village with his mother, who has a complicated history with Pietro.
3	"Il giorno del santo"	The Saint	Enrico Oldoini	April 17, 2011
4	"La prova del fuoco"	Proof of Fire	Enrico Oldoini	April 17, 2011
5	"Il capriolo avvelenato"	Pipe Dreams	Enrico Oldoini	April 24, 2011
6	"Caccia al tesoro"	Treasure Hunt	Enrico Oldoini	April 24, 2011
7	"Salvato dalle acque"	Saved By the Waters	Enrico Oldoini	May 2, 2011
8	"Un salto nel vuoto"	A Jump for Life	Enrico Oldoini	May 2, 2011
9	"Il mostro del lago"	The Lake Monster	Enrico Oldoini	May 9, 2011
10	"L'ape regina"	The Queen Bee	Enrico Oldoini	May 9, 2011
11	"Il volo dell'aquila"	The Flight	Enrico Oldoini	May 17, 2011
12	"La lacrima del gigante"	The Collector	Enrico Oldoini	May 17, 2011

=== Season 2 (2012) ===
No. in series	Italian title	English title	Directed by	Original release date
1	"Facili prede"	Easy Prey	Riccardo Donna	October 14, 2012
The two young children of the owner of a farm end up in hospital poisoned. Suspicion falls on one of the brothers of the woman, still resentful at having to give up his inheritance of the farm, which the law allocates only the eldest son. Pietro finds a girl in the woods, in a state of shock, who only speaks a little Italian and seems to have lost her memory. Pietro takes care of her and something begins to grow between the two of them. Meanwhile, Giorgio is back in San Candido, where he is eagerly welcomed by Chiara. She introduces him to her friend Miriam, who right away seems to be attracted to him. Vincenzo decides that it is time to take the plunge, and after many failed attempts, ask Silvia to marry him.
2	"Il richiamo del sangue"	The Strength of Blood	Riccardo Donna	October 18, 2012
A young girl in San Candido mysteriously disappears. It looks to be a classic case of abduction, but behind the despair of the family lies many secrets. Thanks to Huber, everyone in San Candido knows about Vincenzo's plan to propose to Silvia and wait excitedly for the good news. However, having been told by Silvia that she needs time to think about it, the policeman has only disappointing news for his friends. Meanwhile, Anya's father arrives to take his daughter's things, but he also brings important new revelations. Giorgio and Chiara have their first misunderstanding as he realizes how difficult it is to take care of a blind girl.
3	"Il seme della gelosia"	Seeds of the Jealousy	Riccardo Donna	October 18, 2012
During a rave in a World War II underground bunker hidden in the woods, a man falls to his death. Giorgio, having gone to the rave with Miriam, without telling Chiara, is forced to reveal his secret in order to help the investigation. But when Chiara finds out, she doesn't take it well. Meanwhile, Vincenzo has to endure the presence of Tobias, who has no other place to stay and moves into his and Silvia's home. Vincenzo also meets a mysterious woman who seems very interested in him, while Pietro tries to track down Nikolay, the man who was posing as Anya's father.
4	"L'istinto dell'uomo"	Human Instincts	Riccardo Donna	October 25, 2012
Just as a museum near San Candido is about to open an exhibition containing a reproduction of Otzi, the mummy of a prehistoric man found years ago in the snow of a glacier, the mummy disappears along with some artifacts. In its place, the dead body of the archaeologist who organized the event is found. The preparations for the wedding come alive as Silvia and Vincenzo chose witnesses. Huber organises the stag do, but it has an unexpected, yet comedic ending. Chiara still can't forgive Giorgio for going to the rave without saying anything, and in his frustration, finally succumbs to Miriam's advances.
5	"Tra le nuvole"	In the Clouds	Riccardo Donna	October 25, 2012
In the mountains of Val Pusteria, a deflated hot air balloon is found. The pilot, a young family man just separated from his wife, is found unconscious a few kilometers away. Pietro has not yet given up on finding out more about Anya, and decides to print flyers with her photo and information on. Tobias and Silvia must leave for a mission in the woods, alone, for six days. Vincenzo tries to hide his jealousy as best he can, but a chance conversation overheard on the radio gets him worked up. Meanwhile, Giorgio, still gnawed by guilt, continues to avoid Chiara, who begins to think that the problem is her refusal to have sex with him.
6	"La leggenda del pescatore"	The Legend of the Fisherman	Riccardo Donna	November 1, 2012
During a routine speed check, Huber is shot by the driver he pulls over. That night, Pietro spots a small boat in flames on the lake. Inside is the charred body of an experienced fisherman from the area. Are the two things are connected? Stuck in hospital, Huber asks Vincenzo to look after his three daughters and their pet pig, who they consider part of the family. In the company of the children, Vincenzo and Silvia are confronted with the future of their relationship, and if having their own children will come soon. Meanwhile, after having confessed his infidelity, Giorgio tries to make things right with Chiara, but she just can't forgive him. And after finding out that Tobias has secured funding for the expedition to Alaska, an angry and upset Vincenzo tells her she must choose between the marriage and the expedition.
7	"Falsa partenza"	A False Start	Riccardo Donna	November 1, 2012
During a sky marathon, a race in the mountains, one of the participants disappears, and is then found dead at the bottom of a ravine. The boy is the son of a prominent businessman in the area. Meanwhile, after his infidelity becomes public knowledge, Giorgio's relationships with his friends become more and more tense. After Vincenzo's ultimatum to choose between their marriage and her expedition to Alaska, Silvia is undecided. For her the two things are not mutually exclusive. Huber also makes an attempt to reconnect Silvia and Vincenzo, but after Tobias presses for them to leave as soon as possible, Silvia is forced to make a decision.
8	"Fuori dal mondo"	Out of This World	Riccardo Donna	November 8, 2012
9	"La nuova via"	A New Path	Riccardo Donna	November 8, 2012
10	"Musica silenziosa"	Silent Music	Salvatore Basile	November 15, 2012
11	"L'ombra del diavolo"	An Evil Shadow	Salvatore Basile	November 15, 2012
12	"Vite sospese"	Dangling Lives	Salvatore Basile	November 22, 2012
13	"La fuga"	The Escape	Salvatore Basile	November 22, 2012
14	"Io ti salverò"	I'll Save You	Salvatore Basile	November 29, 2012

=== Season 3 (2015) ===
No. in series	Italian title	English title	Directed by	Original release date
1	"Il figlio delle stelle"	Son of the Stars	Monica Vullo	January 8, 2015
2	"Amici per la pelle"	The Best of Friends	Monica Vullo	January 15, 2015
3	"Il migliore"	The Best	Monica Vullo	January 15, 2015
4	"Il predatore"	The Predator	Monica Vullo	January 22, 2015
5	"Il giusto riposo degli alberi"	Rest for the Trees	Monica Vullo	January 22, 2015
6	"Caccia all'uomo"	Manhunt	Monica Vullo	January 29, 2015
7	"Sepolta viva"	Buried Alive	Monica Vullo	January 29, 2015
8	"Il sentiero della verità"	The Path of Truth	Monica Vullo	February 5, 2015
9	"Il veleno dell'uomo"	A Man's Poison	Jan Maria Michelini	February 5, 2015
10	"La scomparsa di Pietro"	The Mystery of the San Bernard	Jan Maria Michelini	February 9, 2015
11	"Il toro"	The Bull	Jan Maria Michelini	February 9, 2015
12	"Oltre il buio"	Beyond the Dark	Jan Maria Michelini	February 19, 2015
13	"Soldi sporchi"	Dirty Money	Jan Maria Michelini	February 19, 2015
14	"Aliloke"	Aliloke	Jan Maria Michelini	February 26, 2015
15	"Il castello di Monguelfo"	The Monguelfo Castle	Jan Maria Michelini	February 26, 2015
16	"Richiami lontani"	A Call from Afar	Jan Maria Michelini	March 9, 2015
17	"La leggenda vivente"	The Living Legend	Jan Maria Michelini	March 12, 2015
18	"La vera madre"	His Real Mother	Jan Maria Michelini	March 16, 2015

=== Season 4 (2017) ===
No. in series	Italian title	English title	Directed by	Original release date
1	"La maschera del diavolo"	The Devil's Mask	Jean Maria Michelini	January 17, 2017
2	"Il sentiero verso casa"	The Path to Home	Jean Maria Michelini	January 20, 2017
3	"Sfida verticale"	Vertical Challenge	Jean Maria Michelini	January 20, 2017
4	"L'accusa"	The Accusation	Jean Maria Michelini	January 26, 2017
5	"La trappola"	The Trap	Jean Maria Michelini	January 26, 2017
6	"Il sacro fuoco"	The Sacred Fire	Jean Maria Michelini	February 2, 2017
7	"Spiriti liberi"	Free Spirits	Jean Maria Michelini	February 2, 2017
8	"Oltre l'infinito"	Over Infinity	Jean Maria Michelini	February 16, 2017
9	"La ragazza del lago"	The Girl by the Lake	Jean Maria Michelini	February 16, 2017
10	"La bella addormentata"	Sleeping Beauty	Jean Maria Michelini	February 23, 2017
11	"Preda innocente"	Innocent Prey	Jean Maria Michelini	February 23, 2017
12	"L'uomo dei lupi"	The Man of the Wolves	Jean Maria Michelini	March 2, 2017
13	"Radici"	Roots	Jean Maria Michelini	March 2, 2017
14	"Legami di sangue"	Ties of Blood	Jean Maria Michelini	March 7, 2017
15	"Il morso del dolore"	The Bite of the Pain	Jean Maria Michelini	March 7, 2017
16	"La scelta"	The Choice	Jean Maria Michelini	March 14, 2017
17	"Ferita mortale"	Mortal Wound	Jean Maria Michelini	March 14, 2017
18	"Il volto del demone"	The Face of the Demon	Jean Maria Michelini	March 21, 2017

=== Season 5 (2019) ===
No. in series	Italian title	English title	Directed by	Original release date
1	"Il ritorno"	The Return	Jean Maria Michelini	September 12, 2019
2	"Le radici del male"	The Roots of Evil	Raffaele Androsiglio	September 19, 2019
3	"Ferite profonde"	Deep Wounds	Raffaele Androsiglio	September 26, 2019
4	"Il gigante e il bambino"	The Giant and the Child	Cosimo Alemà	October 3, 2019
5	"I figli di Deva"	The Sons of Deva	Cosimo Alemà	October 10, 2019
6	"Fantasmi del passato"	Ghosts of the Past	Cosimo Alemà	October 17, 2019
7	"Onora il padre"	Honor your Father	Cosimo Alemà	October 24, 2019
8	"La fuga"	The Escape	Cosimo Alemà	October 31, 2019
9	"La sorgente dell'odio"	The Source of Hatred	Cosimo Alemà	November 7, 2019
10	"Il figlio"	The Son	Cosimo Alemà	November 14, 2019

=== Season 6 (2021) ===
No. in series	Italian title	English title	Directed by	Original release date
1	"La bambina magica"	The Magical Girl	Unknown	April 1, 2021
2	"Sogni e ossessioni"	Dreams and Obsessions	Unknown	April 8, 2021
3	"Il leone della montagna"	The Lion of the Mountain	Unknown	April 15, 2021
4	"Tanatosi"	Thanatos	Unknown	April 22, 2021
5	"La domesticazione dell'uomo"	The Domestication of Man	Unknown	April 29, 2021
6	"Il confine"	The Border	Unknown	May 6, 2021
7	"Il sentiero delle ore"	The Path of Time	Unknown	May 13, 2021
8	"Lacrime nella pioggia"	Tears in the Rain	Unknown	May 20, 2021

=== Season 7 (2023) ===
No. in series	Italian title	English title	Directed by	Original release date
1	"L'uomo degli Orsi"	The Bear Man	Enrico Ianniello	March 30, 2023
2	"Altezze diverse"	The Chains of Memories	Enrico Ianniello	April 6, 2023
3	"Purosangue"	Thoroughbred	Laszlo Barbo	April 13, 2023
4	"Solo per amore"	Only for Love	Laszlo Barbo	April 20, 2023
5	"Radici e rami"	Roots and Branches	Laszlo Barbo	April 27, 2023
6	"Nido d'amore"	Love Nest	Laszlo Barbo	May 4, 2023
7	"Il guardiano del lago"	The Lake Guardian	Enrico Ianniello	May 7, 2023
8	"L'ultima verità"	The Showdown	Enrico Ianniello	May 8, 2023
