= Balla con noi =

Italian film

- Directed by: Cinzia Bomoll
- Written by: Massimiliano Bruno, Pier Paolo Piciarelli, Cinzia Bomoll, Francesco Paolo Di Salvia
- Produced by: Giannandrea Pecorelli
- Starring: Alice Bellagamba; Andrea Montovoli; Mascia Musy; Sara Santostasi; Guido Branca; Samuel Terracina; Ons Ben Raies; Giuseppe Di Mauro; Roberto Stocchi; Matteo Urzia; Mauro Peruzzi; Elisabetta Di Carlo; Fiorenza Tessari; Massimo Ciavarro
- Cinematography: Marco Bassano
- Edited by: Lorenzo K. Stanzani
- Music by: Alessandro Tamburrini, Federico Ferretti, Stefano Tartaglini
- Distributed by: 01 Distribution
- Release date: 2011
- Running time: 102 minutes
- Country: Italy
- Language: Italian
- Budget: €1.8 million
- Box office: $67,512

Balla con noi (transl. Dance with Us) is a 2011 Italian teen dance film directed by Cinzia Bomoll.

== Plot ==
Erica is a ballerina at the National Dance Academy of Rome. Her final exam is just a couple of months away. Although she tries her best, she is not dancing up to her standards. Something's not working. Her teacher Valeria shames her in front of her classmates as a mean to try and shake her. The distraction and the stress cause her to fall and hurt her ankle. She stops going to school and her whole world seems to collapse around her.

Her brother, Marco is the leader of the Avengers, a multi-ethnic hip-hop dance crew. Some years prior, Marco decided to run away from home to pursue a different lifestyle than the traditional one desired for him by his parents. Erica tries to get closer to Marco in search of support in this time of crisis. She then meets Congo, Marco's best friend, and Congo invites her to join the Avengers in The Battle, the Italian qualifiers for the Battle of the Year, an International breakdancing competition. Erica starts to dance with the crew and discovers a world totally different from hers. At the same time, when she tries to deepen her relationship with Marco, she understands that the distance between the two siblings became too big through the years.

Marco tries to help his sister recover her love for ballet by inviting her to the opera at the Rome Opera House. Moved by the skilled ballerinas performing Tchaikovsky's Swan Lake, Erika seems to fall in love again with classical dance. She goes back to the Academy and rekindle her relationship with Valeria. Unfortunately, she discovers that her graduation exam and The Battle are on the same day. Erica would like to go with the crew; but her new friends convince her that her place is in the Academy.

== Cast ==
- Alice Bellagamba as Erika
- Andrea Montovoli as Marco
- Mascia Musy as Valeria
- Sara Santostasi as Antonella
- Guido Branca as Congo
- Samuel Terracina as Aziz
- Ons Ben Raies as Najat
- Giuseppe Di Mauro as Manga
- Roberto Stocchi as Enzo
- Matteo Urzia as Ferruccio
- Mauro Peruzzi as Cico
- Elisabetta Di Carlo as Betty
- Fiorenza Tessari as Rossana
- Massimo Ciavarro as Giancarlo

== Reception ==
=== Box office ===
The film opened in 42 Italian theaters on the 27th of May 2011. The film grossed €46.000 in its first week. By 15 November 2023, the film had grossed $67,512 worldwide. The film bombed at the box office in relation to its production cost of €1.8 million.

The movie was distributed in 13 countries, including in Russia under the title Я хочу танцевать.

=== Critical response ===
The movie has been met with mixed reviews and it was mostly praised for its hip-hop choreographies. Critics favorably compared Let's Dance to an urban fairy tale and to American dance movies more than to a realistic film.
