= Gianmarco Pozzoli =

Italian comedian (born 1971)

- Born: 24 October 1971 (age 55); Milan, Italy
- Occupations: Actor, comedian

Gianmarco Pozzoli (born 24 October 1971) is an Italian actor and comedian.

== Life and career ==
Pozzoli began his career in the early 1990s performing in stage productions of The Rocky Horror Picture Show at Cinema Mexico in Milan. In the late 1990s, he gained wider recognition as a comedian as part of a duo with Gianluca De Angelis, later joined by Marta Zoboli, appearing in several Italian television programmes including Zelig, Paperissima Sprint, Colorado and Geppi Hour. He also made solo appearances on television, notably in Scorie.

Pozzoli made his film debut in 1999 with All the Moron's Men and later starred in television series such as Un passo dal cielo and Talent High School - Il sogno di Sofia, as well as in films including Benvenuti al Nord and Mi rifaccio vivo. In 2016, together with Alice Mangione, he co-founded The Pozzolis Family, a social media and live-performance project centred on family life.

== Personal life ==
Pozzoli began a relationship with actress Alice Mangione in 2013. They married in May 2019 and have two children, Giosuè and Olivia Tosca. In July 2025, the couple publicly announced that they had separated the previous year.

== Filmography ==
Film
Year	Title	Role	Notes
1999	All the Moron's Men	Groom	
2012	Benvenuti al Nord	Magonza	
2013	Mi rifaccio vivo	Afterlife librarian	

Television
Year	Title	Role	Notes
2011–present	One Step from Heaven	Huber Fabricetti	Main role
2012–2013	Talent High School - Il sogno di Sofia	De Blasi	Main role
