= Marzia Tedeschi =

Italian actress (born 1976)

- Born: 16 March 1976 (age 50); Italy
- Occupations: Film actress, television actress, stage performer
- Years active: 2004–present

Marzia Tedeschi is an Italian actress, who mainly stars in Italian and German films, TV shows and plays. She lives in Berlin.

She was born on 16 March 1976 in Cittá della Pieve as Marzia Lucacchioni, Italy. She graduated with honors in Theater and Performing arts in La Sapienza University of Rome in 2003. She studied acting in England and attended many acting workshops, while working in theater, television, and film. Marzia was trained in the Stanislavsky-Strasberg method and the Sandy Meisner Technique, and studies often with the English acting coach Mike Bernardin at the Actor Space of Berlin. In 2015, she attended the European Masterclass "The power of the actor" with the American coach Ivana Chubbuck in Berlin.

== Acting career ==
Marzia began her career as a stage actress with the role of Antigone, directed by Kathy Marchand, at the Ateneo Theater while at college in Rome in 2001. She made many theatrical performances in leading roles as well as co-roles across Europe, and her first role on TV was in 2001 in the soap "Carabinieri", directed by Raffaele Mertes, Mediaset. Her debut on the big screen followed with the much-acclaimed short film "Life is an Illusion", released in 2004 and shot in Los Angeles. Although she played in some TV movies in following years, it was the feature film "Il Pane Nudo"(2006), directed by Rachid Benhadj, that became a turning point in her career. The movie is based on the autobiographical novel "El Khubz el Hafi" of the Moroccan writer Mohamed Choukri. Marzia played the role of a cynical whore named Sallafa who was the protagonist's lover, played by Said Taghmaoui. Marzia shaved her head for the role. Despite her limited screen space, she gave a powerful performance and her decision to shave the long silky tresses was warm welcomed and successful. She was awarded as "Best Actress" for this movie in 2006 Tiburon Film Festival, happened in San Francisco. Then "Best Actress" Award also in Rotterdam Film Festival 2006 and "Best supporting actress" Award in BAFF Festival in Italy. She played in Italy the role of Irene in the TV Series "Il Bene e il Male" directed by Giorgio Serafini, Rai1, the role of the teacher Federica in "Lab-Story", directed by Daniele Auricchio, Rai Edu and a bosniac woman, named Jasmine, in the popular Italian TV Series "L´Isola" directed by Alberto Negrin, Rai1, 2012, and that of Mrs T in "La cura" by Francesco Di Salvia. Eventually she became a busy television actress above all in Germany, where she moved lately and where she made her debut in the German television industry in 2013 with the role of "Francesca di Matteo" in "Patchwork Family" TV Soap, that was live on Sat1 channel. After that she performed in the popular Bavarian TV series "Dahoam is Dahoam" in the role of "Gina" Meanwhile, she never left her passion for theater. Her last performance was the much acclaimed "Clan Macbeth" in Dorothy Strelsin Theater in Manhattan, MITF Festival in New York, 2014. Clan Macbeth is an adaptation from William Shakespeare's popular drama in which she played the role of Lady Macbeth. She will be seen in the upcoming season of Tatort, the popular German drama series which will be aired in 2015, where she plays a character named Maria, the new Italian girlfriend of the inspector Kopper. She attended also as a member of the jury, Kufar Theatre Festival in Minsk, Belarus, 2014 and she was also a member of the international short-film jury in Damascus Film Festival 2010.

== Filmography ==
- "Life is an Illusion" short (2004)
- "Il pane nudo - Al Khubz al hafi" feature-film (2006)
- "Il compito" short (2007)
- "No Problem" feature-film (2008)
- "La cura" short (2011)
- "Mancanza-Studio" feature-film (2011)
- "Ein Bad völler Tränen" short (2014)
- "Das Kokainbiest" short (2015)

== Television ==
- "Carabinieri" Mediaset (2001–02)
- "Lab-story" Rai Edu (2007–08)
- "Il Bene e il Male" Rai (2008–09)
- "L´Isola" Rai (2012)
- "Patchwork Family", Sat1 channel, Germany (2013)
- "Dahoam is Dahoam" Costantin Produktion, Germany (2013)
- "Tatort" - "Die Sonne stirbt wie ein Tier" (2015)
- "Goster" (2015)
- "Urlaub mit Mama" (2018).

== Awards ==
- Best Actress Award in Tiburon Film Festival 2006 for "Il Pane Nudo"
- Best Actress Award in BAFF Festival 2006 for "Il Pane Nudo"
- Best Actress Award in Arab Film Festival 2006, the Netherlands for "Il Pane Nudo"

== Theatre ==
- "Clan Macbeth" Béjaia int. theatre Festival and National theatre of Algier, Algeria (2015).
- "Clan Macbeth", Poti int.dirette Festival, Georgia (2015).
- "Clan Macbeth" by William Shakespeare, role Lady Macbeth, Theatre Dorothy Strelsin, Manhattan, MTTF, New York (2014)
- "Rock Caligola" by Albert Camus, role Cesonia, dir. by Daniele Scattina, Theatre Tor Bella Monaca, Rom, Italien (2014)
- "Clan Macbeth" by W. Shakespeare, role Lady Macbeth, dir. by Daniele Scattina, "Amman Theatre Festival", Jordan (2011)
- "Clan Macbeth" by W.Shakespeare, Lady Macbeth," Theatre degli avvaloranti"PG,"Theatre Tor di Nona" Rome (2011)
- "Attivamente coivolte" by Daniela Giordano, from Euripide, role Andromaca, Theatre Palladium, Rome (2008)
- "Come lo fanno le ragazze" by Ilda Bartoloni, role Elisa, dir.by Daniela Giordano, Theatre Piccolo Eliseo, Rome(2008)
- "Incursioni amorose" by Roberto Leoni, two roles/ two one act, Denny Cechini Teatro Sala Petrolini, Rome(2007)
- "L´Isola e il vento" by Giulio Querini, role La maga, Giulio Querini Teatro Ateneo, Rome (2006)
- "L´Impresario delle Smirne" by Carlo Goldoni, role Lucrezia Giuggioli, dir. by Massimo Belli, Taormina Theater Festival and National tour(2004/2005)
- "L´Italiana in Algeri", role Paggia-servitrice, dir. by Maurizio Scaparro Teatro dell´Opera, Rome 2004
- "La Boheme", role a prostitute, dir. by Franco Zeffirelli, Teatro dell´Opera, Rome 2004
- "Drunken Song, or some men are born posthumously", dir. by Terry Enright, Theatre "The Studio" Exmouth, England 2002
- "Red red shoes", dir. by Rith Way, Theatre "The Studio" Exmouth, England 2002
- "Francesca la Santa della Little Italy", role Suora, dir.by Massimo Belli, Theatre "La Fontana", Milan 2001
- "Antigone" by Bertold Brecht Antigone Kathy Marchand, Theatre Ateneo, Rome 2001
