= Le grida del silenzio =

- Film poster
- Directed by: Sasha Alessandra Carlesi
- Written by: Sasha Alessandra Carlesi
- Produced by: Giuseppe Milazzo Andreani
- Starring: Alice Bellagamba; Luca Avallone; Manuela Zero; Roberto Calabrese; Martina Carletti; Ana Cruz; Luca Molinari
- Cinematography: Robin Brown
- Edited by: Andrea D'Emilio
- Music by: Luigi Ferri
- Release date: 3 May 2018 (Ischia Film Festival)
- Running time: 90 minutes
- Country: Italy
- Language: Italian

Le grida del silenzio (lit. 'The cries of silence') is a 2018 Italian thriller film directed by Sasha Alessandra Carlesi.

== Cast ==
- Alice Bellagamba as Desirée
- Luca Avallone as Luca
- Manuela Zero as Sophie
- Roberto Calabrese as Daniel
- Martina Carletti as Alice
- Ana Cruz as Kathrina
- Luca Molinari as Manuel
- Lucia Batassa as Maria
- Ivan Castiglione as Corrado
- Giuseppe Cantore as Antonino
- Alessandra Carrillo as Estella
- Alessandra Carlesi as Arianna
- Eleonora Cecere as Valeria
- Beppe Convertini as Maurizio
- Roberta Garzia as Laura
- Gegia as Mirella
- Valentina Ghetti as Niky
- Giuseppe Milazzo Andreani as Tony
- Angela Pepi as Serena
- Patrizia Pellegrino as Chiara
- Domenico Prezioso as Fabio
- Cosetta Turco as Sarah
