= Milena Miconi =

Italian actress & model (born 1971)

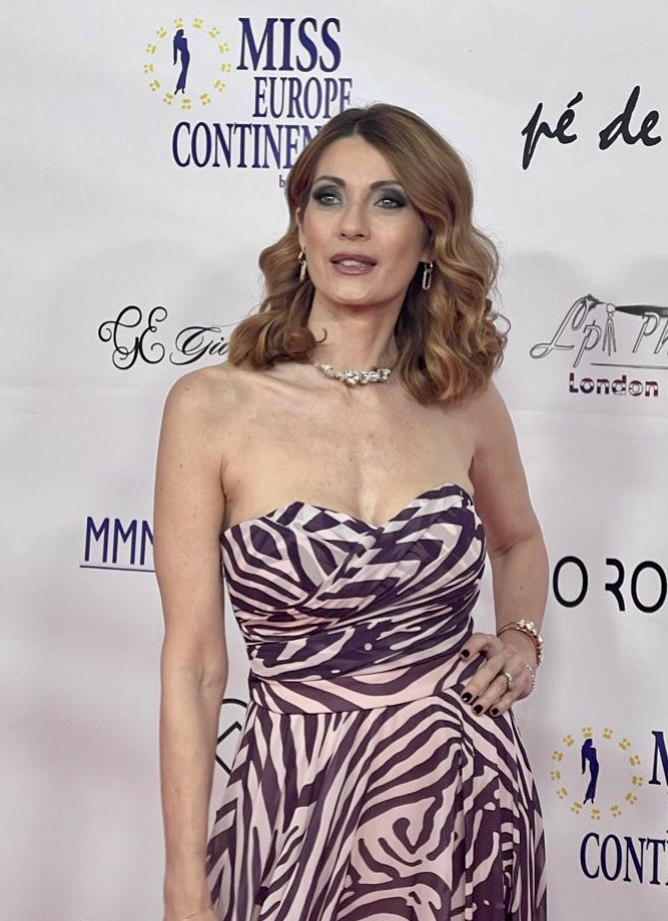
- Born: 15 December 1971 (age 54); Rome, Italy
- Occupation: Actress
- Years active: 1985–present
- Height: 1.76 m (5 ft 9 in)
- Spouse: Mauro Graiani (m. 2019)
- Children: 2

Milena Miconi (born 15 December 1971) is an Italian actress and former model.

She is an advocate for Parent Project, an organization for children suffering from muscular dystrophy.

== Personal life ==
Miconi has married twice and has two daughters, Sofia and Agnese; she considers herself Roman Catholic.

== Filmography ==
=== Film ===
- Finalmente soli, directed by Umberto Marino (1997)
- Fuochi d'artificio, directed by Leonardo Pieraccioni (1997)
- Il sottile fascino del peccato, directed by Franco Salvia (2010)
- Divino, (short film) directed by Giovanni Bufalini (2011)
- La strada di Paolo, directed by Salvatore Nocita (2011)
- Miss Wolf and the Lamb, (short film) directed by Roberto Leoni (2011)
- 100 metri dal paradiso, directed by Raffaele Verzillo (2012)
- Il disordine del cuore, directed by Edoardo Margheriti (2013)
- Babbo Natale non viene da Nord, directed by Maurizio Casagrande (2015)

=== Television ===
- 1997 – Un posto al sole;
- 1998 – S.P.Q.R., directed by Claudio Risi;
- 1999 – Anni '50, directed by Carlo Vanzina;
- 1999 – Don Matteo, directed by Enrico Oldoini – episode Il fuoco della passione;
- 2000 – Tequila & Bonetti – episode Crimini d'estate;
- 2000 – La casa delle beffe, directed by Pier Francesco Pingitore;
- 2003–2004 – Carabinieri 2 and 3, directed by Raffaele Mertes;
- 2004 – Don Matteo 4, directed by Giulio Base and Andrea Barzini;
- 2005 – Edda, directed by Giorgio Capitani;
- 2005 – San Pietro, directed by Giulio Base;
- 2005 – Una famiglia in giallo, directed by Alberto Simone;
- 2005–2006 – Don Matteo 5, directed by Giulio Base, Carmine Elia, Elisabetta Marchetti;
- 2007 – Gente di mare 2, directed by Giorgio Serafini – episode Una vita da salvare;
- 2008 – Vita da paparazzo, directed by Pier Francesco Pingitore;
- 2008 – Terapia d'urgenza, directed by Carmine Elia, Lucio Gaudino, and Gianpaolo Tescari;
- 2009 – Il commissario Manara, directed by Davide Marengo and Luca Ribuoli;
- 2011 – Il delitto di Via Poma, directed by Roberto Faenza;
- 2011 – Sarò sempre tuo padre, directed by Lodovico Gasparini;
- 2012 – La vita che corre, directed by Fabrizio Costa;
- 2012 – Inspector Rex – episode Gioco sottobanco;
- 2013 – Un medico in famiglia 8 – Fiction TV.
