= Talent High School - Il sogno di Sofia =

- Genre: Sitcom
- Developed by: Emanuela Canonico
- Starring: Alice Bellagamba; Gianluca Vicari; Emanuela Di Crosta; Romolo Guerreri; Katsiaryna Shulha; Gianmarco Pozzoli; Francesco Salvi; Alessandro Fella
- Country of origin: Italy
- Original language: Italian
- No. of seasons: 2
- No. of episodes: 48

Production
- Executive producers: Luca Bernabei; Matilde Bernabei
- Running time: 20 minutes
- Production companies: Lux Vide; De Agostini

Original release
- Network: Super!
- Release: September 24, 2012 – October 3, 2013

Talent High School – Il sogno di Sofia is an Italian sitcom, produced by Lux Vide, whose main character, Sofia, played by Alice Bellagamba, is a young girl passionate about dancing. The premiere of the first season was broadcast on Super! from 24 September 2012, while the second one from 2 September 2013.

== Overview ==
Sofia Perri, daughter of mechanic Sirio, dreams of entering the Talent High School Academy to harness her passions, cultivated on her own, of dancing and singing. Often disappointed in her hopes of success, decides to impersonate Allegra De Magistriis, the daughter of a Hollywood producer. From time to time her act for good air flow is likely to be with funny results.

== Cast ==
=== Main cast ===
- Alice Bellagamba as Sofia Perri, Sofia lives with her father Sirio, a mechanic in a workshop on the outskirts of the city. She has one dream: dancing. Self-taught, she has always danced, among the cars and machinery of the workshop, hidden from her father who doesn't understand or approve of her passion. She shows real talent for modern dance, but is incapable of doing a single step of classical ballet. Self-confident and forthright, Sofia grew up in a working-class neighborhood and is used to getting by on her own. She has a strong sense of justice and doesn't understand anything about trendy attitudes. She is tenacious and does all she can to get into Talent High School, a first class academy for the performing arts. The entry requirements are very demanding: applicants need to go through a tough selection process, but also prove that they have attended other equally exclusive establishments, something that Sofia cannot do and, as a result, is not accepted by the school. One last chance comes her way in the shape of Allegra de Magistriis, daughter of a very famous Hollywood producer. Allegra backs out of the place she was assigned at Talent High School and Sofia, her spitting image, decides to risk assuming her identity. And so Sofia begins a new and exciting life made up of dance, acting and singing lessons and ...lies! Because Sofia will have to lie every day to her teachers, her fellow students and even to her father who thinks she is studying at a business college.
- Alice Bellagamba as Allegra De Magistriis, Everyone looks at her as a reference point, the girl from across the Atlantic who launches new styles each time she takes a breath. Always perfect, always fashionable and full of talent for dancing. When she impersonates Allegra, Sofia has to act like a snob, pretend to have the world at her feet, move with nonchalance and always prove herself worthy of every situation, without any weakness ... A far from easy task! The real De Magistriis is a fairly reserved young woman ... she is known for her talent, for the awards she has received for her dancing and for her famous parents. People's expectations are huge: “Is it true ... you really met ... and you danced with ...” Their comments are meaningless. Couldn't Sofia have resembled someone with a lower profile? In spite of all this, “Sofia/Allegra” is a friendly girl, a leader capable of creating a pleasant atmosphere in her circle of friends... also thanks to her working-class spontaneity that surfaces from time to time.
- Gianluca Vicari as Bart, He is hot! And an excellent dancer. The whole school admires him, but he is rather unfriendly and aggressive. Always on the defensive, he keeps his distance and has the ability to be cruelly and violently honest. He is no doubt the most talented student at the school, but wishes he was elsewhere. His father, a music producer, forces him to attend the academy. Bart's dream, on the other hand, is to study engineering to work with engines and get a job with Ferrari. Sofia is the only one to find out about this passion, just as he is the only one to discover her dual identity. After clashing at first, the two of them realize that they can help each other out. Bart will teach Sofia classical ballet while Sofia will introduce Bart to her father Sirio, who will teach him all about mechanics.
- Emanuela Di Crosta as Greta, Greta is ... Greta. A world apart, a world all of her own. She loves to write and is the best student in the creative writing class. There isn't a single second or minute of the day when Greta isn't thinking about or writing poems, short stories and wacky monologues. She is a slightly strange girl but good- natured, full of enthusiasm and always capable of seeing the good side of situations and people. When she does cause trouble, it's not because she's mean ... but because she's so naïve! She is generous and a true friend who often gives good, albeit "unorthodox" advice. Her eccentricity immediately charms Sofia ... as well as Greg, even though she doesn't notice the signs that he continually sends her.
- Romolo Guerreri as Greg, A fashion genius: his dream is to become a designer. Indeed, the way he dresses leaves no doubt as to what his true passion is. His shyness and hypochondria, along with his great talent, make him the ideal victim for Marion's tyranny, against which he tries to rebel in vain. He seems to live in a world of his own. His hypochondria makes him afraid of everything around him and causes him to foresee a catastrophic outcome to the different situations in which he finds himself. In a totally unexpected manner, he falls in love with Greta, the girl furthest away from “fashion” in the strictest sense, and will have to find the courage to express his feelings for her.
- Katsiaryna Shulha as Marion, Marion is the only student who, notoriously, got a place at the academy thanks to someone pulling strings because ... she is the Principal's daughter. For this reason, she is the terror of all the students; anyone who isn't nice to her, who doesn't shower her with compliments or dares to laugh during her performances ... is immediately summoned to the Principal's office. Marion is the boss and all others are at her feet, starting with Greg. She doesn't know the word "please," no one has ever heard her apologize and the school is where she is the undisputed dictator. The only person that she fears is Allegra who could undermine her stature. After an initial failed attempt to become friends, Marion has decided to systematically destroy Allegra. She doesn't miss a single opportunity to mock her and attempt to humiliate her. She has no talent, even if she firmly believes that she is the best in every discipline. Marion has just one passion ... herself! She often opens the compact that she carries in her purse and looks at herself, talking to her own reflection ... like any self-respecting witch!
- Gianmarco Pozzoli as Professor De Blasi, Tutor of the group of five first-year students, a task that he carries out more or less in his own way. De Blasi is a rather odd man. His whole life is governed by a single passion: the composition of the musical that he has been working on for 17 years! He is continually searching for sounds, murmurs and words that conceal perfect harmony within them. He often freezes completely and starts writing frantically on his hands which are always covered with notes: a new chord has just come to him. No one believes that he will ever find it after all these years spent pursuing this dream. However, to everyone's surprise, he ends up providing the lyrics for the musical that the students will work on for their year end project. Because of his eccentric nature, De Blasi is a friendly man with whom the students like to spend their time.
- Francesco Salvi as Sirio Perri (season 1), A good man but fairly gruff and very pragmatic. His inability to understand his daughter's passion is not down to meanness, but to what he sees as its distance from real life. A widower from an early age, when Sofia was just one year old, he has never remarried and has devoted himself solely to his daughter and to his work as a mechanic. Years ago, he worked for Ferrari. But those days are over and all his memories, photos, uniforms and badges, are kept in a box that even Sofia has never opened. Thanks to Bart and to the enthusiasm with which he asks Sirio about those days, he will open that box again, dusting off an old dream.
- Alessandro Fella as Patrick (season 2), is a 17-year-old handsome young man who is admired and loved by all. He is from Dublin and has come to Talent High School for one year as an exchange student. He's cheerful, nice and is able to stun people with his smile and leaves the girls breathless (Allegra and Marion are the first). He's a DJ and is world renown, a real legend at the console! Before becoming a successful DJ, he was a very promising young boxer who won International competitions. Yet his dreams were broken all too soon due to a serious injury that cost him his career. After the accident, he found the strength to start over thanks to this passion at the console. Even though Sofia is forced to lie about her real identity, she is immediately won over by this sweet boy who never has too many problems and is always available. At least that's what it seems... Patrick is called to substitute Bart and participate with Allegra in the Dance Competition finals, but pulls out at the last minute, showing himself for who he really is- a cynical young man who has let life disappoint him and has lost the ability to believe in dreams!
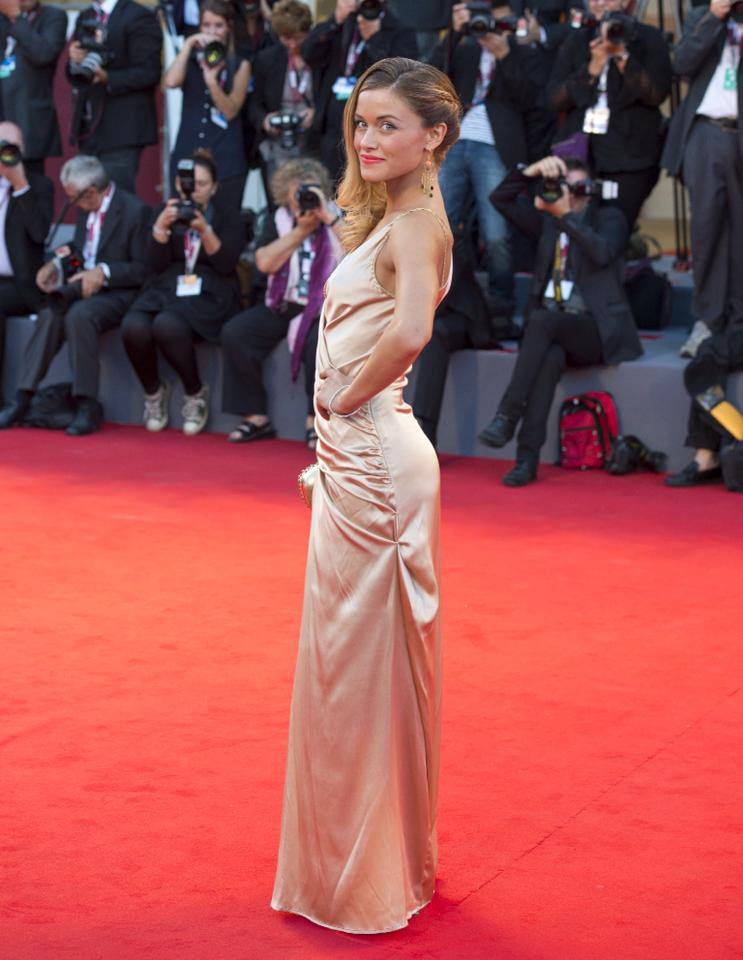
Alice Bellagamba is Sofia Perri/Allegra De Magistriis

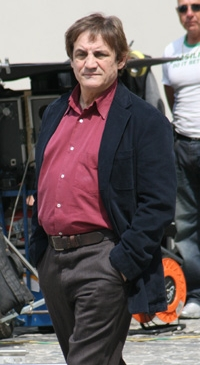
Francesco Salvi is Sirio Perri

=== Season 1 (2012) ===
No. overall	No. in season	Title (Italian)	Title (English)	Directed by	Original release date
1	1	"Una nuova vita"	New life	Daniela Borsese	September 24, 2012
2	2	"Good Luck"	Good Luck	Daniela Borsese	September 25, 2012
3	3	"A carte scoperte"	Trump card	Daniela Borsese	September 26, 2012
4	4	"La mia migliore nemica"	My best "enemy"	Daniela Borsese	September 27, 2012
5	5	"The Show Must Go On"	The Show Must Go On	Daniela Borsese	September 28, 2012
6	6	"Se questa è arte"	If this is art	Daniela Borsese	October 1, 2012
7	7	"Afonia, che brutta malattia!"	A lost voice	Daniela Borsese	October 2, 2012
8	8	"Il grande Marcel Gros"	The great Marcel Gros	Daniela Borsese	October 3, 2012
9	9	"Super nerds party"	Super nerds party	Daniela Borsese	October 4, 2012
10	10	"Previsioni pericolose"	Dangerous Forecasts	Daniela Borsese	October 5, 2012
11	11	"San Valentino"	Valentine's Day	Daniela Borsese	October 8, 2012
12	12	"La Star del primo anno"	The Freshman Star	Daniela Borsese	October 9, 2012
13	13	"Una tenera canaglia"	A sweet rascal	Daniela Borsese	October 10, 2012
14	14	"Campagna elettorale"	Electoral Campaign	Daniela Borsese	October 11, 2012
15	15	"Affliction Five"	Affliction Five	Daniela Borsese	October 12, 2012
16	16	"È tempo di club"	Time for clubs"	Daniela Borsese	October 15, 2012
17	17	"Un volto da copertina"	A covergirl face	Daniela Borsese	October 16, 2012
18	18	"Una notte in accademia"	A Night at the Academy	Daniela Borsese	October 17, 2012
19	19	"A volte ritornano"	Sometimes They Return	Daniela Borsese	October 18, 2012
20	20	"La smemorata dell'Accademia"	The absent-minded student	Daniela Borsese	October 19, 2012
21	21	"Il ballo in maschera"	Masquerade ball	Daniela Borsese	October 22, 2012
22	22	"L'esame di fine anno"	Year-end finals	Daniela Borsese	October 23, 2012
23	23	"Grandi preparativi"	Great Preparations	Daniela Borsese	October 24, 2012
24	24	"Il musical"	The musical	Daniela Borsese	October 25, 2012

=== Season 2 (2013) ===
No. overall	No. in season	Title (Italian)	Title (English)	Directed by	Original release date
25	1	"Un nuovo anno"	New year	Daniela Borsese	September 2, 2013
26	2	"Il maestro d'amore"	The master of love	Daniela Borsese	September 3, 2013
27	3	"Lo sport rivelatore"	The sport indicator	Daniela Borsese	September 4, 2013
28	4	"Un fitto mistero"	An Impenetrable Mystery	Daniela Borsese	September 5, 2013
29	5	"Ereditarietà"	Genetics	Daniela Borsese	September 6, 2013
30	6	"Un Halloween da paura"	A Scary Halloween	Daniela Borsese	September 9, 2013
31	7	"Un legame soffocante"	An oppressive bond	Daniela Borsese	September 10, 2013
32	8	"Uno strano caso"	A Strange Case	Daniela Borsese	September 11, 2013
33	9	"Un graffito facile facile"	Easy graffiti	Daniela Borsese	September 12, 2013
34	10	"Nomophobia"	Nomophobia	Daniela Borsese	September 13, 2013
35	11	"Un Natale in coro"	A Christmas Choir	Daniela Borsese	September 16, 2013
36	12	"Meglio soli..."	Better All Alone…	Daniela Borsese	September 17, 2013
37	13	"Prof in sciopero"	Prof On Strike	Daniela Borsese	September 18, 2013
38	14	"Il fantasma dell'Accademia"	The school ghost	Daniela Borsese	September 19, 2013
39	15	"Un'emergenza ecologica"	A "green" emergency	Daniela Borsese	September 20, 2013
40	16	"Le 10 regole"	Ten rules	Daniela Borsese	September 23, 2013
41	17	"L'insegnante americana"	The american teacher	Daniela Borsese	September 24, 2013
42	18	"Reality"	Reality	Daniela Borsese	September 25, 2013
43	19	"Uno scoop da prima pagina"	A Front Page Scoop	Daniela Borsese	September 26, 2013
44	20	"Il segreto in cucina"	The secret ingredient	Daniela Borsese	September 27, 2013
45	21	"A lezione di bon ton"	A lesson in etiquette	Daniela Borsese	September 30, 2013
46	22	"I Cioccolato Amaro"	Dark Chocolate	Daniela Borsese	October 1, 2013
47	23	"Blackout"	Blackout	Daniela Borsese	October 2, 2013
48	24	"L'International Dance Competition"	International Dance Competition	Daniela Borsese	October 3, 2013

== See also ==
- List of Italian television series
