= Alessandro Jacchia =

Italian producer (born 1960)

- Born: September 4, 1960 (age 65); Mexico City, Mexico
- Occupation: Producer

Alessandro Jacchia (Italian pronunciation: [alesˈsandro jakˈkiːa]; born 5 September 1960) is an Italian producer. He is co-founder, president and CCO of Albatross Entertainment S.p.A.

== Life and career ==
Alessandro Jacchia was born in Mexico City in 1960.

He is married and has two daughters. Since 2006 he is the President and Chief Creative Officer of Albatross Entertainment S.p.a., an audiovisual production company based in Rome.

He graduated with a master's degree in Film Direction from the London Film School in 1982 and in 1984 with a Master of Fine Arts in Film Production from the University of Southern California (the P. Stark Motion Picture Producing Course) in Los Angeles. Alessandro Jacchia began his career in Los Angeles in 1982, developing projects and scripts as a story editor for film producer Steve Roth at Columbia Pictures. During the following three years he held the same position also at Paramount Pictures and for producer Alain Bernheim. In 1985 he moved to Mexico and joined Televisa S.A., Latin America's largest telecommunications group, as Director of Artistic Development, an appointment he held until 1991. In 1987 became Producer of Telenovelas (soap operas) until 1990 when, with the soap Mi segunda Madre (200 episodes) he won Best Television Production of the year and nine out of the twelve "TV y Novelas" Awards.

In 1992 he joined the newly founded LuxVide Spa as a Director, responsible for producing European projects until 1998. He became a Member of the Board of Directors at Eudoxa, Lux Vide' s production arm and simultaneously worked as Executive Producer. Between 1993 and 2002 he produced eighty-seven prime-time 100 minute TV movies and mini-series for Lux Vide Spa both in Italy and abroad, in co-production with RAI, Mediaset and other international partners such as TF1, France 2, KirchMedia, RTP, and Sat.1. Among the many films and television series produced there were also Don Matteo 1, 2 and 3.

In 2006, he co-founded, with Maurizio Momi, Albatross Entertainment S.p.A., a company specialized in the production of TV Dramas, for which he guides the artistic and strategic development, and has produced over eighty 100 minutes prime time TV programs, including mini-series and TV series, as well as a feature film. Among the company's regular customers are RAI and Mediaset, the two major Italian broadcasters. He has defined and implemented a strategy that allows Albatross to develop its projects in-house, participating in the financing and consequently retaining ownership over most of the rights and formats, thus confirming Albatross as Independent Producer. The productions by Alessandro Jacchia have received acclaim from both the public and critics along with awards in some of the most prestigious international television festivals, including the FIPA (Festival International de Programmes Audiovisuels) in Biarritz, the Monte-Carlo Television Festival, Banff World Media Festival in Canada, the Shanghai International Film Festival, the Roma Fiction Festival.

He is the author of film stories, screenplays for film and TV Dramas, also made by other producers, such as "Mollo Tutto," "Lourdes", and the format creator of TV series as "Don Matteo" and " The Restorer".

From 2001 to 2007 he was Professor at University of Urbino, where he taught "Economics and Organization of Performing Arts" at the Faculty of Sociology, Communications Studies. Currently, he holds a yearly course entitled "What is an idea?" at Luiss (Libera Università Internazionale degli Studi Sociali Guido Carli - University of Rome and at University of Rome La Sapienza.

In July 2002 he received the Award for Best European Television Producer as part of the 42nd Monte-Carlo Television Festival.

== Awards ==
- Nomination at Roma Fiction Fest for Best TV Drama – Rebel land – The New World, 2013
- Nomination for Best International Producers at Monte-Carlo Television Festival – Maurizio Momi and Alessandro Jacchia for Rebel land, 2011
- Nomination for Best TV movie at Shanghai Television Festival – The scandal of the Roman Bank, 2010
- Nomination for Best TV miniseries at Monte-Carlo Television Festival – The scandal of the Roman Bank, 2010
- Nomination for Best TV miniseries at Roma Fiction Fest – The scandal of the Roman Bank, 2010
- TV Oscar (Premio Regia Televisiva) for Best Fiction of the year - The scandal of the Roman Bank, 2010
- Silver FIPA for Best TV Series at Biarritz Festival International de Programmes Audiovisuels – Maurizio Momi, Alessandro Jacchia and Stefano Reali for The scandal of the Roman Bank, 2010
- Selected to represent Italy at Milan Telefilm Festival – Good and evil, 2009
- Nomination for Best International Producers at Monte-Carlo Television Festival – Maurizio Momi and Alessandro Jacchia for Good and evil, 2009
- Best TV Fiction at Busto Arsizio Film Festival – Good and evil, 2009
- Nomination for best TV Movie at San Diego Italian Film Festival (USA) – A stolen life, 2008
- Nomination for best TV Movie at Monte-Carlo Television Festival – A stolen life, 2008
- Nomination for best TV Miniseries at Monte-Carlo Television Festival – The last flight, 2007
- Nomination at Cathay Pacific Italian Film Festival – Ice on fire, 2006
- Best European Television Producer - 42º Monte-Carlo Television Festival, 2002
- Best Television Producer - TV and Novelas Mexican Festival (Premios TVyNovelas), 1990

== Filmography ==
- Mi segunda Madre, directed by Miguel Còrcega (1989, TV series)
- Carlo Magno, directed by Clive Donner (1993, TV mini series)
- Una bambina di troppo, directed by Damiano Damiani (1994, TV movie)
- Uno di noi, directed by Fabrizio Costa ([1996, TV mini series)
- Nuda proprietà, directed by Enrico Oldoini (1997, TV movie)
- Fatima, directed by Fabrizio Costa (1997, TV movie)
- Lui e lei, directed by Luciano Manuzzi (1996, TV mini series)
- Dio vede e provvede, directed by Enrico Oldoini, Paolo Costella (1996, TV movie)
- Dio vede e provvede 2, directed by Enrico Oldoini, Paolo Costella (1997, TV series)
- Dio vede e provvede 3, directed by Enrico Oldoini, Paolo Costella (1998, TV series)
- Lui e lei 2, directed by Luciano Manuzzi (1999, TV mini series)
- Rock Crystal, directed by Maurizio Zaccaro (1999, TV movie)
- Vola Sciusciù, directed by Joseph Sargent (2000, TV movie)
- Don Matteo, directed by Enrico Oldoini (2000, TV series)
- Don Matteo 2, directed by Andrea Barzini, Leone Pompucci (2001, TV series)
- Angelo il custode, directed by Ugo Fabrizio Giordani, Alfredo Arciero (2001, TV series)
- La crociera, directed by Enrico Oldoini (2001, TV mini series)
- La Sindone, directed by Ludovico Gasparini (2001, TV movie)
- Crociati, directed by Dominique Othenin-Girard (2001, TV movie)
- Don Matteo 3, directed by Enrico Oldoini, Andrea Barzini, Leone Pompucci (2002, TV series)
- Il bambino di Betlemme, directed by Umberto Marino (2002, TV movie)

Albatross Productions

- The wrong man, directed by Stefano Reali (2005, TV mini series)
- The man who dreamt with eagles, directed by Vittorio Sindoni (2006, TV mini series)
- Ice on fire, directed by Umberto Marino (2006, movie)
- Love and war, directed by Giacomo Campiotti (2007, TV mini series)
- The last flight, directed by Umberto Marino (2007, TV mini series)
- The third truth, directed by Stefano Reali (2007, TV mini series)
- The stolen life, directed by Graziano Diana (2008, TV movie)
- Good and evil, directed by Giorgio Serafini, Dario Acocella (2009, TV series)
- The man who rode in the dark, directed by Salvatore Basile (2008, TV mini series)
- Island's secrets, directed by Ricky Tognazzi (2009, TV series)
- The scandal of Roman Bank, directed by Stefano Reali (2009, TV mini series)
- Rebel Land, directed by Cinzia TH Torrini (2010, TV series)
- Destiny's shadow, directed by Pier Belloni (2011, TV series)
- The restorer, directed by Giorgio Capitani, [Salvatore Basile (2012, TV series)
- Rebel Land - The New World, directed by Ambrogio Lo Giudice (2012, TV series)
- The broken years, directed by Graziano Diana (2014, TV series)
- The restorer 2, directed by Enrico Oldoini (2014, TV series)
