= Non smettere di sognare (TV series) =

- Genre: Comedy
- Starring: Katy Louise Saunders; Giuliana De Sio; Roberto Farnesi; Sara D'Amario; Luca Ward
- Country of origin: Italy
- No. of seasons: 1
- No. of episodes: 8

Original release
- Release: March 16 – May 4, 2011

Non smettere di sognare is an Italian television series.

== See also ==
- List of Italian television series
