= Don Matteo =

Italian television series

- Don Matteo (Terence Hill, left) and Antonio Cecchini (Nino Frassica) in a 2009 episode
- Genre: Comedy; Mystery
- Created by: Enrico Oldoini
- Starring: Terence Hill; Nino Frassica; Nathalie Guetta; Flavio Insinna; Simone Montedoro; Maria Chiara Giannetta; Francesco Scali; Caterina Sylos Labini; Pamela Saino; Simona Di Bella; Giusy Buscemi; Giada Arena; Pietro Pulcini; Claudio Ricci; Evelina Gori; Gastone Moschin; Renato Carpentieri; Milena Miconi; Andrea Cereatti; Sara Santostasi; Steven Manetto; Shukri Said; Astra Lanz; Giuseppe Sulfaro; Ilaria Spada; Simona Marchini; Sydne Rome; Andrea Pittorino; Laura Glavan; Eleonora Sergio; Bruno Cabrerizo; Nadir Caselli; Giorgia Surina; Andrés Gil; Sara Zanier; Dario Cassini; Dalila Pasquariello; Maurizio Lastrico; Pamela Villoresi; Dario Aita; Teresa Romagnoli; Cristiano Caccamo; Serena Iansiti; Francesco Castiglione; Domenico Pinelli; Mariasole Pollio; Federico Russo; Pasquale Di Nuzzo; Giulia Fiume; Federico Ielapi; Aurora Menenti; Emma Valenti; Mattia Teruzzi; Giorgia Agata; Raoul Bova
- Country of origin: Italy
- No. of seasons: 15
- No. of episodes: 285 (list of episodes)

Production
- Producer: Alessandro Jacchia
- Production locations: Gubbio (1−8); Spoleto (9−13)
- Running time: 60−120 minutes (per episode)
- Production company: Lux Vide for Rai Fiction

Original release
- Network: Rai 1
- Release: 7 January 2000 – 19 March 2026

Don Matteo (English: Father Matthew) is an Italian mystery comedy television series that has been airing on Rai 1 since 2000.

== History ==
The protagonist of the series is Father Matteo (portrayed by Terence Hill), a Catholic priest in a parish of the town of Gubbio, Perugia. He is also known for his unrivaled talent in investigating local crime stories. Father Matteo is a wise and respected person who really manages to understand people's problems, and always appears to be willing to help. Thanks to his charm and positivity, he often helps criminals on their way to redemption and he always convinces them to confess their crimes and to accept their responsibilities.

Comedian Nino Frassica portrays Marshal Antonio "Nino" Cecchini, a Carabiniere who becomes Matteo's best friend. Cecchini is one of the main co-protagonists and often provides humour and comic relief in the series. Other notable cast members include Flavio Insinna, who portrayed Captain Flavio Anceschi from 2000 to 2006, Milena Miconi, who played Laura, the mayor of Gubbio as well as Anceschi's love interest and Simone Montedoro who has been playing the role of Captain Giulio Tommasi, successor to Anceschi, since the sixth season.

From season 8, Don Matteo is filmed in HDTV 1080i.

The series has also a Polish version titled Ojciec Mateusz produced by TVP and a Russian version titled Otec Matvej (tr.: Отец Матвей).

== Syndication ==
The series is syndicated in the United States by MHz Networks.

== Synopsis ==
The plot primarily revolves around the titular Matteo, a Catholic priest with an impressive insight in human nature, aiding the Carabinieri, the national as opposed to local police force personnel in solving crimes (usually murder cases). In this he usually finds support in marshal Antonio Cecchini, a warrant officer who often shares with him important details and clues, but also hostility, in the figure of Cecchini's direct superiors, captain Flavio Anceschi and later captains Giulio Tommasi and Anna Olivieri, who have little tolerance for the priest's continuous interference with the investigations despite the deep esteem they have for him.

== Cast and characters ==
- Terence Hill as Father Matteo Minelli-Bondini: The series' protagonist and a Catholic priest with an impressive insight into human nature, aiding the Carabinieri (police) station in solving crimes (usually murder cases). (seasons 1–13)
- Raoul Bova as Father Massimo Sartori/Matteo Mezzanotte: another Catholic priest, former agent of Carabinieri; replaces Father Matteo Bondini after his depart to Africa. (5^ episode of 13–present)
- Nathalie Guetta as Natalina Diotallevi: Father Matteo's housekeeper. (seasons 1–present)
- Nino Frassica as Marshal Antonio "Nino" Cecchini: Marshal of Gubbio and Spoleto Carabinieri military police stations and best friend of Father Matteo. (seasons 1–present)
- Flavio Insinna as Captain Flavio Anceschi: Captain of Gubbio Carabinieri military police station. (seasons 1–5)
- Simone Montedoro as Captain Giulio Tommasi: Captain of Gubbio and Spoleto Carabinieri military police station, successor of Anceschi. (seasons 6–10, guest 12)
- Maria Chiara Giannetta as Captain Anna Olivieri: Captain of Spoleto Carabinieri military police station, successor of Tommasi. (seasons 11–present)
- Francesco Scali as Pippo Gimignani-Zerfati: Father Matteo's sacristan. (seasons 1–present)
- Caterina Sylos Labini as Caterina Cecchini: Wife of Marshal Cecchini. She died of a hitherto unknown illness. (seasons 1–11)
- Pamela Saino as Patrizia Cecchini: First daughter of Marshall Cecchini and wife of Captain Giulio Tommasi, she was killed in a car accident. (seasons 2–8)
- Giada Arena, Giusy Buscemi and Simona Di Bella as Assuntina Cecchini: Second daughter of Marshall Cecchini. (seasons 2–present)
- Pietro Pulcini as Brigadier Piero Ghisoni: Carabiniere in Gubbio and Spoleto Carabinieri military police stations. (seasons 1–3; seasons 5–present)
- Giuseppe Sulfaro as Appuntato Severino Cecchini: Nephew of Marshal Cecchini and carabineer in Gubbio and Spoleto police station. (seasons 6–10)
- Eleonora Sergio as Andrea Conti: Public minister (prosecutor) of Gubbio. (season 8)
- Giorgia Surina as Bianca "Bibba" Venezia: Public minister of Spoleto and friend of Tommasi that becomes a rival in Lia's love. (season 9)
- Dario Cassini as Gualtiero Ferri: New public minister of Spoleto which replaces Bianca Venezia. He leaves Spoleto when he discovers that Captain Tommasi get engaged to Margherita, and then return when the captain refused to marry her after falling in love with Lia. (season 10)
- Maria Rosaria Russo as Lucrezia Volpi: New public minister of Spoleto which replaces Gualtiero Ferri (season 10)
- Maurizio Lastrico as Marco Nardi: New public minister of Spoleto which replaces Lucrezia Volpi. (seasons 11–present)
- Simona Marchini as Clara Tommasi: Mother of Captain Giulio Tommasi (seasons 6–10)
- Nadir Caselli as Lia Cecchini: Niece of Marshall Cecchini who falls in love with Captain Tommasi. (seasons 9–10)
- Emma Reale as Martina Tommasi: Daughter of Captain Giulio Tommasi and the late Patrizia Cecchini. (seasons 9–10)
- Astra Lanz as Sister Maria: Friend of Father Matteo. (seasons 6–present)
- Laura Glavan as Laura Belvedere: 16 years old pregnant girl hosted in Father Matteo's rectory, daughter of Antonio Belvedere, old friend of Matteo. She falls in love with Tomàs Martinez. (seasons 8–10)
- Andrés Gil as Tomàs Martinez: Young boy who is serving a year in prison in Father Matteo's rectory; he is looking for his sister Alma. He falls in love with Laura. (seasons 9–10)
- Letizia Arnò as Ester Natalina Belvedere: Little daughter of Laura Belvedere and Giuliano Rovati. (seasons 9–10)
- Claudio Ricci as Nerino Bertolacci: Children who lived in Father Matteo's rectory (seasons 1–4)
- Evelina Gori as Grandma Elide: Sprightly grandmother of Nerino (seasons 1–3)
- Sara Santostasi as Camilla: Bolivian little girl who lived in Father Matteo's rectory (season 4)
- Steven Manetto as Tommaso: Another child who lived in Father Matteo's rectory (season 5)
- Andrea Pittorino as Agostino: Another child who lived in Father Matteo's rectory (seasons 7–8)
- Dalila Pasquariello as Sabrina Esposito: Former convict who thanks to Father Matteo goes to work alongside Tomas. (season 10)
- Gabriele De Pascali as Alberto Torre: Boyfriend of Laura for a short period. (season 10)
- Andrea Cereatti as Appuntato Linetti: Carabiniere in Gubbio police station. (season 4)
- Dario Cassini as Gualtiero Ferri: District attorney of Spoleto police station. (season 10)
- Milena Miconi as Laura Respighi: Mayor of Gubbio and wife of Captain Anceschi. (seasons 4–5)
- Ilaria Spada as Amanda Patriarchi: Former girlfriend of Captain Tommasi. (seasons 6–7)
- Raniero Monaco di Lapio as Daniele Orsini: Former boyfriend of Lia Cecchini. (season 10)
- Sara Zanier as Margherita Colognese: Girlfriend of Gualtiero Ferri who shortly falls in love with Captain Tommasi. (season 10)
- Gastone Moschin as Guido: Bishop of Gubbio and friend of Father Matteo. (seasons 1–2)
- Renato Carpentieri as Bishop of Gubbio: Successor of Guido. (season 3)
- Philippe Leroy as Mons. Benelli: Bishop of Gubbio and friend of Father Matteo. (seasons 6–7)
- Sydne Rome as Susi Dallara: Principal of Gubbio and Spoleto high school. (seasons 7–present)
- Bruno Cabrerizo as Fernando: Spanish friend of Patrizia Cecchini. (season 8)

== Episodes ==
Season	Episodes	Premiere	Finale
1	16	January 7, 2000	February 20, 2000
2	16	October 21, 2001	December 9, 2001
3	16	September 27, 2002	November 15, 2002
4	24	February 19, 2004	May 6, 2004
5	24	February 1, 2006	April 27, 2006
6	24	January 17, 2008	April 10, 2008
7	24	September 10, 2009	November 26, 2009
8	24	September 15, 2011	December 8, 2011
9	26	January 9, 2014	April 10, 2014
10	26	January 7, 2016	April 14, 2016
11	25	January 11, 2018	April 19, 2018
12	10	January 9, 2020	March 19, 2020
13	10	March 31, 2022	May 26, 2022
14	10	October 17, 2024	December 19, 2024
15	10	January 8, 2026	March 19, 2026

== Reception ==
The series received two awards at the 42nd Monte-Carlo Television Festival in 2002: Terence Hill won the award for Best Actor and Alessandro Jacchia won the award for Best Producer.

== See also ==
- Father Brown - English literary series which has a similar premise of a crime-solving priest and which has been repeatedly adapted for television
