= Maurizio Lastrico =

Italian actor and comedian (born 1979)

- Lastrico in 2023
- Born: 31 March 1979 (age 47); Genoa, Italy
- Occupations: Actor; comedian
- Years active: 2007–present

Maurizio Lastrico (born 31 March 1979) is an Italian actor and comedian. He trained at the acting school of the Teatro Stabile in Genoa, graduating in 2006, and became known for his performances on the Italian television comedy show Zelig, where he delivered comic monologues in rhyming hendecasyllabic tercets inspired by Dante Alighieri's Divine Comedy.

His television work includes the series Tutto può succedere, Call My Agent - Italia, and Real Men. From 2018 to 2024, he played public prosecutor Marco Nardi in Don Matteo. In 2024, he competed in the Amazon Prime Video comedy show LOL - Chi ride è fuori. His film appearances include Io sono Mia (2019), America Latina (2021) and Madly (2025).

== Filmography ==
Film
| Year | Title | Role | Notes |
|---|---|---|---|
| 2013 | Sole a catinelle | Theatre director | Feature film debut |
| 2013 | Extreme Jukebox | David Crystal | |
| 2015 | The Complexity of Happiness | Ivano | |
| 2019 | Io sono Mia | Andrea | |
| 2021 | America Latina | Simone | |
| 2025 | Madly | Romeo | |
| 2025 | Tutta colpa del rock | Roberto | |
| 2026 | Benvenuti in campagna | Gerry | |

Television
| Year | Title | Role | Notes |
|---|---|---|---|
| 2007 | Camera Café | Catatonic man | Episode 119 |
| 2007 | Il capitano | | Episode "Operazione Sant'Isidro" |
| 2014 | Le due leggi | Camilla's boyfriend | Miniseries |
| 2015–2018 | Tutto può succedere | Elia | |
| 2018–2024 | Don Matteo | Marco Nardi | |
| 2019 | Made in Italy | Filippo Cerasi | |
| 2019 | The Trial | Giovanni Malaguti | Main role |
| 2022 | Devotion, a Story of Love and Desire | Marco | Miniseries |
| 2023–present | Call My Agent - Italia | Gabriele Di Lillo | Main role |
| 2023 | Sei donne – Il mistero di Leila | Gregorio Mantoni | |
| 2023 | Non ci resta che il crimine – La serie | Duccio Casati | Main role |
| 2024 | Mameli – Il ragazzo che sognò l'Italia | Giuseppe Garibaldi | Miniseries |
| 2025 | Miss Fallaci | Alfredo Pieroni | Main role |
| 2025–present | Real Men | Massimo | Main role |
| 2026 | Before Us | Gabriele Sartori | Main role |
