= The Uninvited (1996 film) =

- Genre: Drama; Horror; Mystery
- Written by: Karen Clark
- Directed by: Larry Shaw
- Starring: Sharon Lawrence; Beau Bridges; Shirley Knight; Alex D. Linz; Lawrence Pressman; James Pickens Jr.
- Music by: Wendy Blackstone
- Country of origin: United States
- Original language: English

Production
- Producers: Lori-Etta Taub; Karen Clark
- Editor: John A. Barton
- Running time: 90 minutes
- Production companies: Thomas Carter Company; Hamdon Entertainment

Original release
- Network: CBS
- Release: October 29, 1996

The Uninvited, also known as Victim of the Haunt, The Haunting of Patricia Johnson, and The House at the End of the Street, is a 1996 made-for-TV film directed by Larry Shaw and starring Sharon Lawrence and Beau Bridges. Inspired by true events, the film was written by Karen Clark.

== Overview ==
The infamous haunting events in the film have also been depicted in other supernatural television shows, including Haunted Lives: True Ghost Stories, Sightings and A Haunting. The film premiered as a Tuesday Night Movie special on CBS near the Halloween season. The film was viewed by 8.5 million viewers and received a 15 share while holding 3rd place in its time slot.

== Plot ==
Inspired by true events. After Patti Johnson gives birth to a still-born child, she and her husband try to forget the tragedy. They move into a new house, but a number of supernatural phenomena that takes place there, lead them to believe that the house is haunted. Patti turns to the town psychic, who confirms her suspicions about ghostly activity. The house is haunted by the spirit of a man who, 75 years earlier, killed his young son and was then shot by his own wife, as well as by the spirit of the murdered son. And now the killer is after Patti's 3-year-old son, Jonathan.

== Cast ==
- Sharon Lawrence as Pattie Johnson
- Beau Bridges as Charles Johnson
- Shirley Knight as Delia
- Alex D. Linz as Jonathan Johnson
- Emily Bridges as Molly
- Lawrence Pressman as Winston
- James Pickens Jr. as Cornelson
- Kathleen Lloyd as Laurette
- Lesley Woods as Charlotte
- Lauren Bowles as Sarah Parrish
- Lynn Griffith as Martha
- Stephen Lee as Bruce
- Steven Griffith as Officer Friendly

== Releases ==
The film premiered on CBS on October 29, 1996 and was released on DVD on September 28, 2004, under the title, Victim of the Haunt.
