= We Best Love =

- Promotional poster
- Genre: Teen drama BL
- Written by: Lin Pei-yu
- Directed by: Ray Jiang
- Starring: Sam Lin; Yang Yu-teng; Ray Chang; Shih Chih-tian; Richard Lee; Evan Luo
- Country of origin: Taiwan
- Original language: Mandarin
- No. of seasons: 2
- No. of episodes: 14

Production
- Executive producer: Joe Tsai
- Producer: Sammi Pan
- Running time: 30 minutes
- Production company: Result Entertainment

Original release
- Network: WeTV
- Release: January 8 – April 9, 2021

We Best Love, also known as WBL, is a Taiwanese television drama series produced by Result Entertainment for the streaming service WeTV. It tells the story of two male classmates, Gao Shi-de (Sam Lin) and Zhou Shu-yi (Yang Yu-teng).

The first season, titled No. 1 For You (Chinese: 永遠的第一名; lit. "Forever No. 1"), premiered on January 8, 2021 and streamed for six episodes with one special episode. The second season Fighting Mr. 2nd (Chinese: 第二名的逆襲; lit. "No. 2's Counterattack"), set five years after the events of the first season, premiered on March 5, 2021. A director's cut of the series, We Best Love: Special Edition, premiered on June 25, 2021. It was featured on Teen Vogue's best BL dramas of 2021 list.

== Premise ==
The series follows the romance of Gao Shi-de and Zhou Shu-yi as they navigate the misunderstandings that threaten to destroy their relationship.

== Cast and characters ==
- Sam Lin as Gao Shide (Chinese: 高仕德): Zhou Shuyi's classmate who will do whatever it takes to take the number one spot from Shuyi to keep his attention. Jimmy Liu played a younger version of Gao.
- Yang Yu Teng as Zhou Shuyi (Chinese: 周書逸): the ambitious son of a wealthy Japanese businessman who is irritated at Gao Shide for always being one step above him in every aspect of his school and personal life
- Ray Chang as Pei Shouyi (Chinese: 裴守一): Gao Shide's older cousin with an affective disorder who works as a school doctor
- Shih Chihtian as Yu Zhenxuan (Chinese: 余真軒): Gao Shide's coworker with Asperger's who has had a history with Pei Shouyi
- Richard Lee as Shi Zheyu (Chinese: 石哲宇): Gao Shide and Zhou Shuyi's classmate
- Evan Luo as Liu Bingwei (Chinese: 劉秉偉): Shi Zheyu's classmate who has a crush on him
- Zack Fanchiang as Fang Zhengwen (Chinese: 方政文): Zhou Shuyi's childhood best friend
- Belle Hsin as Jiang Yuxin (Chinese: 蔣聿欣): Zhou Shuyi's first crush who ends up dating his best friend
- Helena Hsu as Gao Shide's mother
- Eriku Yoza as Zhou Shuyi's father

== Seasons ==
=== No. 1 For You ===
The feeling of being pressed down has never felt so real for Zhou Shuyi. As he stares at the class report, he can't help but to wonder why he's been in second place ever since Gao Shide came into his life in the fifth grade. For this reason, he's excited to leave for college, hoping to never see Gao Shide again. Enjoying his new life in college, he joins the swimming team and is revered by his classmates, that is until Gao Shide enters his life again and swims into first place on his last swimming competition before graduation. Zhou Shuyi doesn't understand why Gao Shide is following him wherever he went, but little does he know that Gao Shide has always had eyes for him.

=== Fighting Mr. 2nd ===
Set five years after the events of the first season, Gao Shide is now the CEO of his family's start-up company, which is facing the threat of being bought out. The buyer's representative is no other than Zhou Shuyi, who hates him for their unresolved separation. Zhou Shuyi may always be second during school, but when his career is on the line, he has no reason to lag behind.

== Media ==
On March 3, 2021, Result Entertainment released a novelization of the first season, No. 1 For You, written by Yu Chen-huan and published by Sharp Point Press. The novelization of the second season was released on April 15, 2021. Both novels came with unreleased scenes that did not make it to the final cut, as well as interviews with the actors. Photobooks for each season were also released, sold separately from the novels.

Title	Chinese title (trad)	Publication date	Publisher	Writer(s)	ISBN
No. 1 For You: WBL1	永遠的第一名：WBL1	March 3, 2021	Sharp Point Press	Yu Chen-huan	9789571093673
No. 1 For You: WBL1 Photobook	永遠的第一名：WBL1寫真書	March 3, 2021	Sharp Point Press	Result Entertainment, WeTV	9789571093550
Fighting Mr. 2nd: WBL2	第二名的逆襲：WBL2	April 15, 2021	Sharp Point Press	Yu Chen-huan	9789571094236
Fighting Mr. 2nd: WBL2 Photobook	第二名的逆襲：WBL2寫真書	April 15, 2021	Sharp Point Press	Result Entertainment, WeTV	9789571099903
