= Alfredo Pieroni =

Italian journalist and essayist (1923–2011)

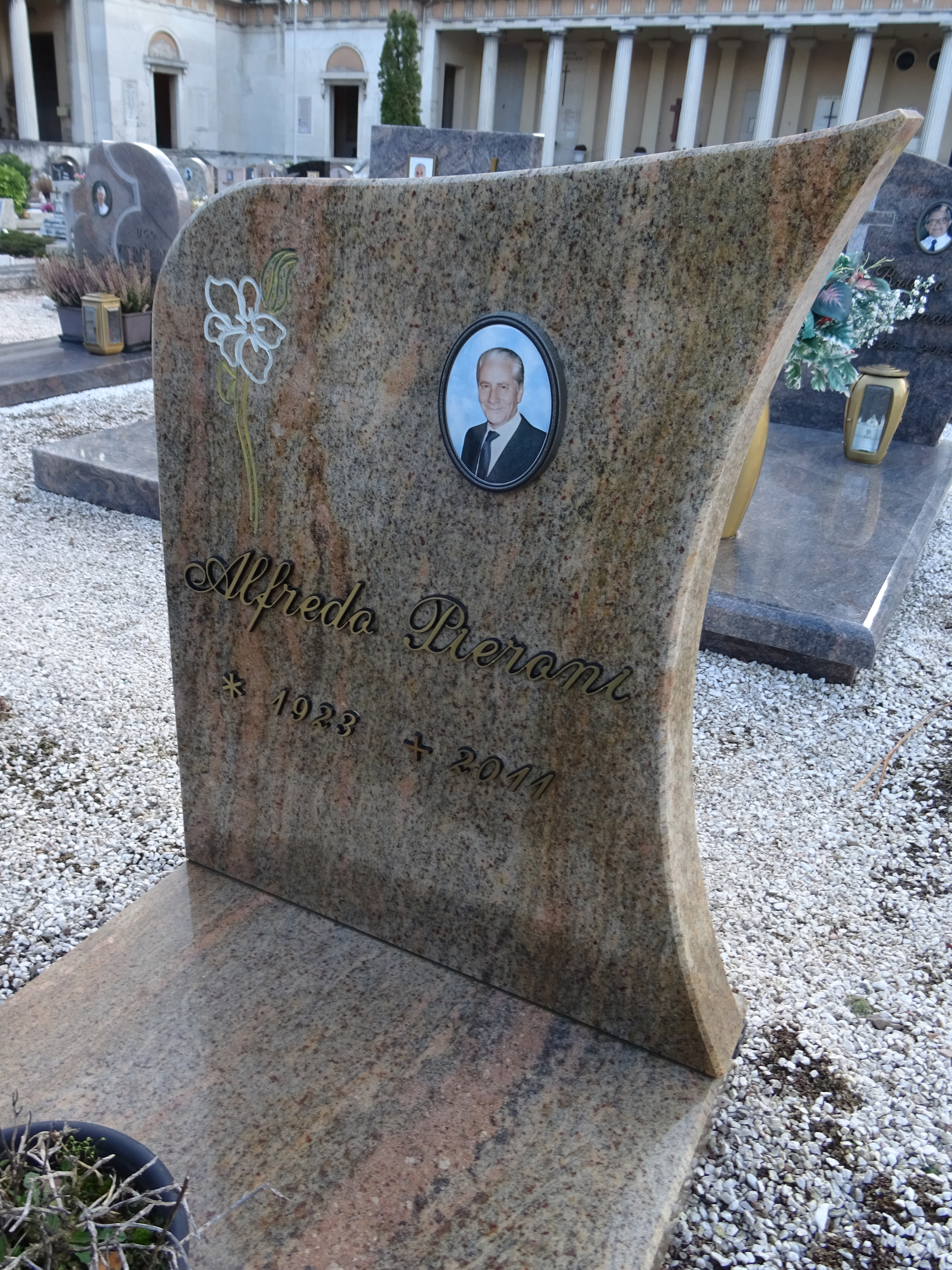
- Alfredo Pieroni's grave
- Born: May 14, 1923; Trieste, Italy
- Died: September 28, 2011 (aged 88); Trento, Italy
- Spouses: Oriana Fallaci; Lucia Solmi

Alfredo Pieroni (14 May 1923 - 28 September 2011) was an Italian journalist and essayist. In 1975, he became the director of Il Resto del Carlino, a Bologna-based mass-circulation daily newspaper, staying in this charge for two years. He was, in 1958, Oriana Fallaci's partner.

== Biography ==
Born in Trieste in 1923, he moved to Rome with his family, where he graduated. He began working as a reporter for Corriere della Sera, Il Resto del Carlino, and Gazzetta del Popolo.

He moved to Bonn and then to London as a correspondent for La Settimana Incom; there, in 1958, he met Oriana Fallaci, with whom he began a romantic relationship.

Pieroni died in 2011 and is buried in the monumental cemetery of Trento.

== Books published ==
- Alfredo Pieroni, Il figlio segreto del Duce. La storia di Benito Albino Mussolini e di sua madre, Ida Dalser, Milano, Garzanti. ISBN 9788811600503
- Alfredo Pieroni, Dizionario degli italiani che contano, Milano, Sperling & Kupfer, 1986.
- Alfredo Pieroni, E se USA e URSS si alleassero?, Milano, Sperling & Kupfer, Collana "SAGGI", 1988.
- Alfredo Pieroni, I russi. L'anima e la storia di un popolo, Milano, Mondadori, 1992.
- Alfredo Pieroni, Perché le sinistre non vinceranno mai più a meno che, Milano, Longanesi & Co, 1996.

== See also ==
- Miss Fallaci
