= Marked Men: Rule + Shaw =

2025 American romantic drama film

- Film poster
- Directed by: Nick Cassavetes
- Written by: Sharon Soboil
- Based on: Rule by Jay Crownover
- Produced by: Jennifer Gibgot; Josh Kesselman; Brian Pitt; J.B. Sugar
- Starring: Chase Stokes; Sydney Taylor; Alexander Ludwig; Ella Balinska; Natalie Alyn Lind
- Cinematography: Kenji Katori
- Edited by: Jim Flynn
- Music by: George Kallis
- Production companies: Voltage Pictures; Ethea Entertainment
- Distributed by: Voltage Pictures
- Release date: January 22, 2025
- Running time: 93 minutes
- Country: United States
- Language: English
- Box office: $1 million

Marked Men: Rule + Shaw (also known simply as Marked Men) is a 2025 American romantic drama film directed by Nick Cassavetes and written by Sharon Soboil. It is an adaptation of Jay Crownover's 2012 novel Rule, part of the Marked Men series. The film stars Chase Stokes as Rule Archer, a rebellious tattoo artist, and Sydney Taylor as Shaw Landon, a pre-med student from an affluent family. The supporting cast includes Alexander Ludwig, Ella Balinska, and Natalie Alyn Lind.

Despite being close for years through their families, hot-tempered tattoo artist Rule has always seen Shaw, a pre-med student from a wealthy background, as a friend, unaware of her long-time interest. They share a night of unexpected intimacy, which causes them to explore their true feelings.

Domestically, the film had a limited special engagement on January 22, 2025, though it did earn $1 million in total from limited releases across various foreign markets.

== Plot ==
Tattoo artist Rule Archer shares a large parlor with several colleagues, and takes his work very seriously. Shaw Landon, who first was friends with his now-deceased identical twin brother Remy, drives them to the Archers' annual commemorative Sunday dinner, as the accident happened three years ago. Their mother gets hammered, and soon Rule storms out.

Far from where they live, Shaw insists on driving him home. Stopping at Remy's crash site, Rule reiterates his guilt, as it happened on the way to picking him up. Upon their arrival, he tells Shaw he has decided he will not go again.

At her apartment, Shaw tells roomie Ayden about Rule's blow out. Suddenly, her friend realises she has feelings for Rule. Ayden hounds Shaw until she confesses, discovering noone else knows, especially her ex-boyfriend Gabe, with whom she is on a break.

Ayden lists Gabe's attributes—smart, rich and her mom loves him. Rule, on the other hand, is sexy and unavailable. Shaw starts waitressing at the tattoo parlor artists' favorite bar. When asked about her, Rule explains he has always called her Casper since they met years ago, as her smallness struck him.

Ayden almost reveals to Rule Shaw's long-harbored feelings for him, but his friend Jet distracts her. As Jet performs, Shaw's ex Gabe comes in. Rule senses Shaw is uncomfortable, so nears him, informing him everyone knows she dumped him.

Suddenly, the tattoo artist crew have a brawl with Gabe and his group, resulting in all being expulsed. On their way home, the crew adds to their graffitti. Rule asks the youngest Jasper to wait for another day to finish his elevated piece so he can help him do it safely.

On her birthday, Shaw goes to a club with Ayden, bumping into Rule. He offers to walk her home, which she initially declines. Shaw then changes her mind, telling Ayden she is leaving with Rule. Her friend is all over Jet, and encourages her to do the same.

Shaw and Rule walk to the tattoo parlour, his home, to get his car keys. She reveals she has always had feelings for him. Removing her dress, Shaw offers to stop if he does not share the attraction, as she wants him to deflower her. Rule gives in, and they spend the night together.

In the morning, Shaw leaves Rule's room half-naked, shocking one of the artists but his brother Rome approves. Rule refuses to talk about it when he comes out. Ayden and Shaw discuss it at length, describing him as being very sweet and gentle.

After a short time, Rule visits Shaw. He explains he does not do boyfriend-girlfriend, but they agree they want to spend time together without labels. So, they experiment sexually, spend lots of time together hanging out, going to museums, walking, going out at night.

Rich from her last husband, Shaw's mother invites her to an extravagant Christmas party. Her ulterior motive is to coerce Shaw into joining their and Gabe’s families on a cruise, so he can propose. Shaw takes Rule with her, but soon gets frustrated with her mother, so they leave.

Unfortunately, Jasper goes to finish the painting alone, although Rule had promised to help. The young artist falls and is hospitalised. Rule finds out on the car ride back home. Blaming himself, he gets angry and breaks up with Shaw. Shortly after, the very attractive Sierra pounces on Rule, once she discovers he is single. When Shaw finds out, she convinces Gabe to start over.

Jasper eventually dies, so the whole Archer family and Shaw go to the funeral. Seeing Rule there stirs up old feelings. When Shaw and Gabe return to the city, she leaves a voicemail message on Rule's answering machine from Gabe's bathroom, saying she misses him- Gabe overhears, loses his temper and hits her.

Rule goes after him, but Gabe defends himself well. When Rome hears, the former soldier confronts Gabe in the parking deck. He clobbers him for Shaw, Rule and himself.

Rule paints an elaborate mural of Shaw to get her attention. Later, he apologizes, admitting he is completely in love with her and wanting to fully commit. Back together, after a year they move in together, ending Rule's bachelor life.

== Cast ==
- Chase Stokes as Rule Archer
- Sydney Taylor as Shaw Landon
- Alexander Ludwig as Rome Archer
- Ella Balinska as Ayden Cross
- Natalie Alyn Lind as Cora Lewis
- Evan Mock as Jet Teller
- Matthew Noszka as Nash Donavan
- Hannah Kepple as Loren
- Daisy Jelley as Sierra
- Michael Bradway as Gabe Davenport
- Adam Abbou as Jasper Brown
- Inanna Sarkis as Jordynn
- Tonya Cornelisse as Madelyn Archer
- Paul Johansson as Dale Archer
- Nancy de Mayo as Eleanor Landon
- Dajana Gudic as Lollipop

== Production ==
In November 2024, it was announced that Nick Cassavetes would direct Marked Men: Rule + Shaw, with Sharon Soboil adapting the screenplay from Jay Crownover's novel. The film's score is composed by George Kallis.

The cast was confirmed in January 2023, with Chase Stokes and Sydney Taylor set to star. Also joining the cast were Ella Balinska, Evan Mock, Alexander Ludwig, Natalie Alyn Lind, Matthew Noszka, Hannah Kepple, Daisy Jelley, Michael Bradway, Adam Abbou, Inanna Sarkis, Paul Johansson, Tonya Cornelisse and Nancy de Mayo.

== Release ==
Marked Men: Rule + Shaw had a limited theatrical release on January 22, 2025.
