= Jimmy Liu =

Taiwanese actor (born 2002)

- 劉敬
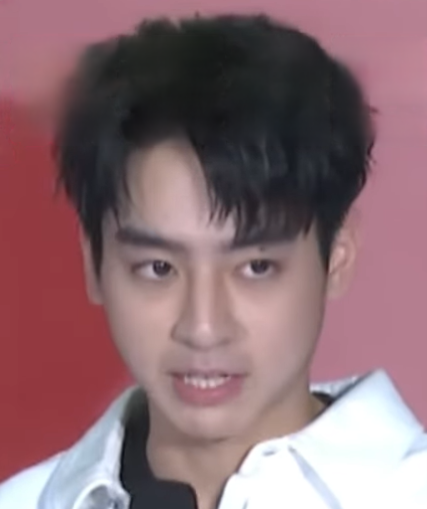
- Liu in September 2025
- Born: Liu Jing; 2002 (age 23–24); Taiwan
- Education: Hsing Wu University
- Occupation: Actor
- Years active: 2020–present

Jimmy Liu Jing (Chinese: 劉敬; born 2002) is a Taiwanese actor best known for his recurring roles as Wu Tsu-wei in the Netflix series Light the Night (2021-2022) and Su Chun-chieh in the TVBS series Youngsters On Fire (2021-2022). He gained international recognition for starring in the American Disney+ series American Born Chinese (2023) alongside Michelle Yeoh and Daniel Wu.

== Early life and education ==
Liu was born in 2002 and grew up in Minsheng Community, Taipei. He began learning Taekwondo at the age of 6 and followed a rigorous daily routine as an athlete. He later earned a black belt and won in numerous local competitions. Liu developed an interest in films alongside his athletic pursuits and often visited the cinema in his neighborhood as a leisure activity. During his junior high school years, he began playing basketball and participated in school performances, ultimately deciding to quit Taekwondo at the age of 16.

== Career ==
Liu was discovered by an acting agency when he was in high school. Despite his parents' objections, he insisted in pursuing an acting career. Liu made his debut as a child actor, portraying the younger version of Wu Nien-hsuan's character in the 2020 television series Magic Moment. He also had a minor role as the younger version of Sam Lin in the 2021 drama series We Best Love.

Liu received his breakthrough role as Wu Tsu-Wei, the clever but depressed son involved in a custody battle between Ruby Lin and Joseph Cheng's characters, in all three seasons of the 2021 Netflix mystery thriller series Light the Night. His performance and the series' popularity earned him widespread recognition in Taiwan. In the same year, Liu had a recurring role as Su Chun-chieh in the first season of the TVBS series Youngsters On Fire. The following year, he made a cameo appearance as one of the deities in the sci-fi series Rainless Love in a Godless Land and had a minor role as the younger version of Chen Bolin's character in Disney+ legal drama series Small and Mighty.

In 2023, Liu secured a co-leading role in the American fantasy action comedy series American Born Chinese, alongside Michelle Yeoh and Daniel Wu, marking his first international role. He portrayed Sun Wei-Chen, the rebellious son of Sun Wukong (played by Wu), and performed most of his own action stunts. Liu's dynamic presence caught the attention of producers Destin Daniel Cretton and Melvin Mar, who discovered him through Light the Night and felt he was a perfect fit for the project. They invited him to join the auditions in spite of the COVID-19 pandemic. He departed from the production of Youngsters On Fire in order to accommodate the filming schedule of American Born Chinese. Liu is currently enrolled at Hsing Wu University but has temporarily suspended his studies to focus on his acting career.

== Filmography ==
=== Television ===
Year	Title	Role	Notes
2020	Magic Moment	Young Fang Zhi Ja (方志嘉)	Guest role
2021	We Best Love	Young Gao Shide (高仕德)	Guest role
2021	Girls Win	Chen Yi (陳毅)	Guest role
2021-2022	Light the Night	Wu Tsu-wei (吳子維)	Recurring role (season 1–3)
2021-2022	Youngsters On Fire	Su Chun-chieh (蘇俊傑)	Recurring role (season 1)
2022	Rainless Love in a Godless Land	Mipalololay	Special appearance
2022	Small and Mighty	Young Liu Lang (劉浪)	Guest role
2023	American Born Chinese	Sun Wei-Chen	Main role
