= Devotion, a Story of Love and Desire =

2022 Italian romantic drama television miniseries

- Also known as: Fidelity
- Italian: Fedeltà
- Genre: Romantic drama
- Based on: Fedeltà by Marco Missiroli
- Written by: Alessandro Fabbri; Marco Missiroli; Elisa Amoruso; Laura Colella
- Directed by: Andrea Molaioli; Stefano Cipani
- Starring: Michele Riondino; Lucrezia Guidone; Carolina Sala; Leonardo Pazzagli; Maria Paiato
- Composer: Teho Teardo
- Country of origin: Italy
- Original language: Italian
- No. of episodes: 6

Production
- Executive producers: Gianfranco Barbagallo; Maria Panicucci
- Producers: Angelo Barbagallo; Matilde Barbagallo
- Running time: 34–46 minutes
- Production company: BiBi Film

Original release
- Network: Netflix
- Release: 14 February 2022

Devotion, a Story of Love and Desire (also known as Fidelity; Italian: Fedeltà) is a 2022 Italian romantic drama television miniseries based on the novel Fedeltà by Marco Missiroli. It was released on Netflix on 14 February 2022.

== Plot ==
A happy marriage is tested when both spouses become tempted by other desires.

== Cast ==
- Michele Riondino as Carlo Pentecoste
- Lucrezia Guidone as Margherita Verna
- Carolina Sala as Sofia Casadei
- Leonardo Pazzagli as Andrea
- Maria Paiato as Anna Verna
- Maurizio Donadoni as Paolo Pentecoste
- Maurizio Lastrico as Marco
- Gianluca Gobbi as Luca
- Sara Lazzaro as Giulia
- David Sebasti as Marcello
- Elisa Di Eusanio as Eva
- Luisa Maneri as Loretta Pentecoste
- Sara Mondello as Silvia Pentecoste
- Leonardo Carradori as Lorenzo
- Lorenzo Aloi as Leonardo
- Camilla Carniello as Lara
- Federico Fazioli as the rector
- Giovanni Crozza Signoris as Jacopo
- Eugenio Di Fraia as Filippo
- Alice Arcuri as Gioia
- Giovanni Crozza as Edo

== Episodes ==
No.	Title	Duration	Original release date
1	"Episode 1"	34 min	14 February 2022
2	"Episode 2"	46 min	14 February 2022
3	"Episode 3"	39 min	14 February 2022
4	"Episode 4"	39 min	14 February 2022
5	"Episode 5"	40 min	14 February 2022
6	"Episode 6"	38 min	14 February 2022

== Production ==
Production on the series began in Milan in January 2021.
