= Valiant One =

- Theatrical release poster
- Directed by: Steve Barnett
- Screenplay by: Eric Tipton; Steve Barnett
- Story by: Steve Barnett; Daniel Myrick
- Produced by: Bernie Goldmann; Steve Barnett; Alan Powell
- Starring: Chase Stokes; Lana Condor; Desmin Borges; Callan Mulvey; Jonathan Whitesell; Daniel Jun
- Cinematography: Daniel Stilling
- Edited by: Andrew Leven
- Music by: Benjamin Backus
- Production companies: Monarch Media; Goldmann Pictures; Brightlight Pictures
- Distributed by: Briarcliff Entertainment
- Release date: January 31, 2025
- Running time: 86 minutes
- Country: United States
- Language: English
- Box office: $1.2 million

Valiant One is a 2025 American action thriller film directed by Steve Barnett and co-written by Eric Tipton.

The film was released in the United States on January 31, 2025, by Briarcliff Entertainment.

== Plot ==
U.S. Army Sergeant Edward Brockman is stationed at Camp Humphreys in South Korea. His commanding officer has assigned him with Corporal Stephaine Selby to repair a ground-penetrating radar (GPR) unit near the Korean DMZ. Brockman pilots the team consisting of Josh Weaver, a civilian tech-support specialist, Chris Lebold, Jonah Ross, Wilson Lee, and Selby to fly close to the border between North Korea and South Korea.

Brockman takes his team to the DMZ and repairs the unit. Upon returning, extreme winds and lightning storms cause the helicopter to malfunction, forcing it to crash deep within North Korean territory. Brockman, Selby, Weaver, Ross, Lee, and the pilot, Milner, survived the crash, but Milner was severely wounded. They try to call in for help, but the U.S command is unable to send a medevac for the team because they just crashed in North Korea, which is beyond any friendly airspace, so they will have to rendezvous at the DMZ.

Pursued by the KPA, the team treks through rough terrain and stumbles upon a village barn, where they are confronted by a farmer and his family. Milner succumbs to his injuries. They bond with the farmer's family and their daughter. While they rest at the barn, the KPA forces arrive to investigate the soldiers' whereabouts, forcing the team to leave. Selby is left behind and hides beneath a floorboard as the authorities search the barn. The officer discovers Milner's body and executes the farmer and his wife for hiding the soldiers, forcing Brockman and his team to kill the patrol.

They take the farmer’s truck to get back across the DMZ, taking the farmer's daughter with them. A patrol car stops them, forcing the team to engage, though Weaver was killed during the shootout. Through the GPR unit, Brockman discovered an underground mine shaft that runs under the border, so he takes his team down there to escape through South Korea. As they navigate the tunnels, North Korean soldiers pursue them. They endure a heavy firefight with the soldiers until they are running out of ammunition, so Brockman covers his team while they retreat to the border. U.S. Delta Force arrives with reinforcements to drive the North Koreans back, forcing them to retreat while they take the wounded Brockman away to safety. The team boards the helicopter and returns to base to get some medical attention.

== Cast ==
- Chase Stokes as Edward Brockman
- Lana Condor as Stephanie Selby
- Desmin Borges as Josh Weaver
- Callan Mulvey as Chris Lebold
- Jonathan Whitesell as Jonah Ross
- Daniel Jun as Wilson Lee

== Production ==
In August 2022, it was revealed that a thriller film titled Valiant One was in development, directed by Steve Barnett and co-written by Eric Tipton, with Chase Stokes cast in the lead role. In September, Lana Condor, Desmin Borges, and Callan Mulvey joined the cast. The next month, Jonathan Whitesell and Daniel Jun rounded out the cast.

Principal photography began on September 19, 2022, in Vancouver, Canada. Unit Patch: The unit patch worn by most characters is the subdued version of the 1st Signal Brigade in Vietnam.

== Release ==
In April 2024, Briarcliff Entertainment acquired the distribution rights to Valiant One, scheduling it to be released in the United States on January 24, 2025. In November, the film's release date was pushed back one week to January 31, 2025.

== Reception ==
=== Box office ===
In the United States and Canada, Valiant One was released on January 31, alongside Dog Man and Companion, and made $735,099 from 1,275 theaters in its opening weekend.

=== Critical response ===
On the review aggregator website Rotten Tomatoes, 31% of 16 critics' reviews are positive, with an average rating of 4.6/10.
