= Bruno (2000 film) =

- The Dress Code VHS cover
- Directed by: Shirley MacLaine
- Written by: David Ciminello
- Produced by: David Kirkpatrick
- Starring: Alex D. Linz; Shirley MacLaine; Gary Sinise; Kathy Bates
- Cinematography: Jan Kiesser
- Edited by: Bonnie Koehler
- Music by: Chris Boardman
- Distributed by: New Angel Films (theatrical); Starz (TV)
- Release date: April 16, 2000
- Running time: 108 minutes
- Country: United States
- Language: English
- Budget: USD $10 million

Bruno (released as The Dress Code on DVD and VHS) is a 2000 American comedy film starring Alex D. Linz and Shirley MacLaine. The film is the first and, as of 2024, the only film ever directed by MacLaine (barring her 1975 documentary feature).

Distributed by New Angel Inc., Bruno premiered at the 2000 Los Angeles Film Festival in a limited theatrical release. From there, the film was distributed straight to cable television and rights to it were acquired by Starz.

== Plot ==
Bruno Battaglia is a young boy attending an American Roman Catholic school. Bruno's estranged father Dino, a police officer, left the family long ago and Bruno lives with his mother Angela. Angela is overweight and dresses flamboyantly in outfits that she designs and makes herself, standing out in stark contrast to the rest of their conservative Italian American neighborhood.

While competing in advancing levels of the Catholic school spelling bee, Bruno decides to start wearing dresses. He wears them as a source of empowerment as well as feeling the need to express himself. He often identifies with angels and, when challenged that he can't wear a dress to the spelling bee championship in Vatican City, Bruno points out that even the Pope wears a dress. For his choice in outfits, Bruno receives heavy criticism from fellow students and faculty, especially the school's Mother Superior as well as becoming a target of the school's bullies. Initially supported only by his best friend Shawniqua, as he progresses further in the spelling competition, his choices of self-expression eventually become accepted by his peers and his superiors. Bruno wins the spelling bee competition and meets the Pope. With the help of his grandmother, Helen, Bruno also begins to form a bond with Dino who, in turn, is inspired by his son to pursue his long abandoned childhood dream of becoming an opera singer, despite previously being unwilling to accept his son, even leaving the room before Bruno sings in a dress.

== Cast and characters ==
- Alex D. Linz as Bruno Battaglia
- Shirley MacLaine as Helen
- Gary Sinise as Dino Battaglia
- Kathy Bates as Mother Superior
- Stacey Halprin as Angela Battaglia
- Kiami Davael as Shawniqua
- Joey Lauren Adams as Donna Marie
- Jennifer Tilly as Dolores
- Brett Butler as Sister Della Rosa

== Soundtrack ==
- "Parigi, o Cara" from La Traviata, performed by The RCA Italiana Opera Orchestra, Carlo Bergonzi and Montserrat Caballé
- "Au fond du temple saint" performed by Jussi Bjoerling and the RCA Victor ORchestra, Robert Merril
- "Di Provenza" from La Traviata, performed by the RCA Italiana Opera Orchestra, Carlo Bergzoni

== Reception ==
On review aggregator website Rotten Tomatoes the film has a score of 20% based on reviews from 5 critics, with an average rating of 3.9/10.

Lael Loewenstein of Variety wrote "It seems especially apt that Shirley MacLaine, a high priestess of self-expression, should make her feature directing debut with a film about a child's quest for individuality. With "Bruno," MacLaine achieves a mixed success. Her name, promo skills and high-profile cast would seem to assure pic theatrical visibility, albeit likely in niche markets".
