= James Greer (writer) =

American novelist and screenwriter

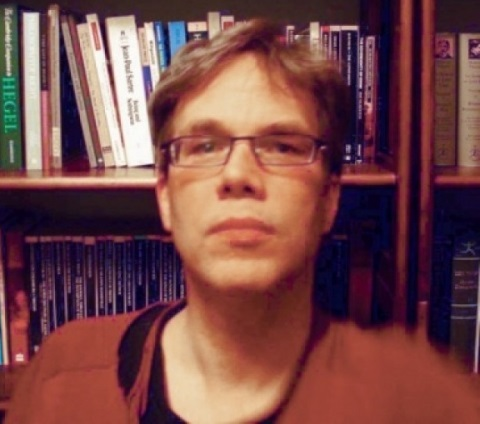
- Greer in 2010
- Occupations: Novelist; screenwriter; director; musician; critic
- Writing career
- Years active: 1991–present
- Genres: Post-modernism, experimental literature, horror
- Notable works: Bad Eminence; Unsane; The Cure
- Website: Official website

James Greer is an American novelist, screenwriter, director, musician, and critic. As a screenwriter, he is known for writing the 2018 thriller Unsane directed by Steven Soderbergh and starring Claire Foy and Juno Temple, as well as the 2026 horror/thrillers Twisted starring Djimon Hounsou and Lauren LaVera and The Cure starring David Dastmalchian and Ashley Greene. Previously, Greer co-wrote the family comedies Max Keeble's Big Move, Just My Luck and The Spy Next Door. He lives in Los Angeles.

== Career ==
=== Music and music criticism ===
Greer was senior editor and senior writer at Spin magazine in New York City in the early 1990s, during which time he helped define the generational cohort that became later widely-known as Generation X.

He wrote and performed all instruments/vocals on the song "Trendspotter Acrobat" on the EP Sunfish Holy Breakfast by Guided By Voices. He was the bassist in the band from 1994 to 1996.

Greer started a band in 2012 with musician Lola G. called DTCV. Pronounced "detective", it was an indie rock duo from Joshua Tree, California. The band released a double album called Hilarious Heaven in 2013 on Xemu Records, followed by a compilation of their early singles and EPs, The Early Year. The duo released their second studio album, Uptime!, in 2015. In April 2016 the band released its third and final studio album, entitled Confusion Moderne, on Xemu Records.

=== Novelist ===
Greer has published three novels: Artificial Light (Little House on the Bowery/Akashic, 2006), The Failure (Akashic, 2010). Artificial Light won a California Book Award Silver Medal for First Fiction. and Bad Eminence (And Other Stories, 2022), which Andrew Gallix in The Irish Times called "this year's cult classic," writing that the novel was "hilarious, exhilarating and mind-blowing".

In 2013 Greer released his first book of short fiction, titled Everything Flows, via Curbside Splendor. Publishers Weekly said of the book "Halfway between the mind of God and a vivid dream, Everything Flows is proof that there remain new places to go, both on paper and in the known universe."

=== Screenwriter ===
Greer has written or co-written several movies, including Max Keeble's Big Move (Disney, 2001), Just My Luck (20th Century Fox, 2006) starring Lindsay Lohan, the Jackie Chan vehicle The Spy Next Door (Lions Gate, 2010) and Unsane, directed by Steven Soderbergh, and starring Claire Foy and Juno Temple (Fingerprint Releasing, Bleecker Street, Regency, 2018). In February 2018, Deadline Hollywood reported that Greer was set to write a script called Planet Kill for Soderbergh to produce. He also has adapted the John Barth novel The Sot-Weed Factor for a projected series from Soderbergh. In 2026 two horror/thriller projects co-written by Greer and his long-time writing partner Jonathan Bernstein were released. One is titled Twisted directed by Darren Bousman starring Djimon Hounsou and Lauren LaVera The film was released by Paramount's Republic Pictures on February 6, 2026. The other is titled The Cure, directed by Nancy Leopardi and starring David Dastmalchian and Ashley Greene and was released in March 2026 by Vertical Entertainment.

== Bibliography ==
=== Fiction ===
- Artificial Light (2006)
- The Failure (2010)
- The Speed Chronicles (2011)
- Everything Flows (2013)
- Bad Eminence (2022)

=== Non-Fiction ===
- R.E.M.: Behind the Mask (1992)
- Guided by Voices: A Brief History: Twenty-One Years of Hunting Accidents in the Forests of Rock and Roll (2005)

== Discography ==
Guided By Voices

- Alien Lanes (1995)
- Sunfish Holy Breakfast (1996)
- Under The Bushes, Under The Stars (1996)

DTCV

- Hilarious Heaven (2013)
- Uptime! (2015)
- Confusion Moderne (2016)

== Filmography ==
=== Film ===
Year	Title	Director	Writer	Notes
2001	Max Keeble's Big Move	No	Yes	Screenplay and story
2006	Mimesis	Yes	Yes	Short film
2006	Love Is Stronger Than Witchcraft	Yes	Yes	Video short
2006	Just My Luck	No	Yes	Story
2006	Larry the Cable Guy: Health Inspector	No	Yes	
2008	Diegesis	Yes	Yes	Short film
2008	La femme qui n'était rien	Yes	Yes	Short film
2008	Bait Shop	No	Yes	Direct-to-video; teleplay
2010	The Spy Next Door	No	Yes	Screenplay and story
2015	Miley Cyrus Wins the Race	Yes	No	Video short
2016	Bourgeois Pop	Yes	No	Video short
2017	A Walk Across the Human Bridge	Yes	No	Video short
2018	Unsane	No	Yes	
2023	Mirror Moves	Yes	Yes	Feature directorial debut
2026	Twisted	No	Yes	
2026	The Cure	No	Yes	
