= Max Keeble's Big Move =

2001 film by Tim Hill

- Theatrical release poster
- Directed by: Tim Hill
- Screenplay by: Jonathan Bernstein; Mark Blackwell; James Greer
- Story by: David Watts; Jonathan Bernstein; Mark Blackwell; James Greer
- Produced by: Mike Karz
- Starring: Alex D. Linz; Larry Miller; Jamie Kennedy; Nora Dunn; Robert Carradine
- Cinematography: Arthur Albert
- Edited by: Tony Lombardo; Peck Prior
- Music by: Michael Wandmacher
- Production companies: Walt Disney Pictures; Karz Entertainment
- Distributed by: Buena Vista Pictures Distribution
- Release date: October 5, 2001
- Running time: 86 minutes
- Country: United States
- Language: English
- Budget: $25 million
- Box office: $18.6 million

Max Keeble's Big Move is a 2001 American comedy film directed by Tim Hill, written by David L. Watts, James Greer, Jonathan Bernstein and Mark Blackwell and starring Alex D. Linz, Larry Miller, Jamie Kennedy, Nora Dunn, and Robert Carradine. The plot follows the eponymous Max (Linz) and his friends, who begins going to junior high school only to learn Max and his family will soon move elsewhere; Max resolves to get even with those who bully him and his friends before he leaves since he will not remain long enough to face discipline for anything he does.

The film was released in the United States by Buena Vista Pictures Distribution on October 5, 2001. It received mixed reviews from critics and was a box-office bomb that only grossed $18.6 million against its $25 million budget.

== Plot ==
Max Keeble is a 12-year-old paperboy who starts his first day of seventh grade at the fictional John J. Curtis High School. He is antagonized by the greedy and tyrannical principal at his school, Elliot T. Jindrake; bullies Troy McGinty and Dobbs; and the Evil Ice Cream Man. Max also learns that an animal shelter he visits next to the school is being closed to build Jindrake's opulent football stadium. One day, Max's father reveals that because of his job, he and the family will be relocating to Chicago for his boss, because he is unable to stand up for himself. Max realizes that he is free to do whatever he wants to his tormentors, facing no consequences because he will be gone by then.

Enlisting his best friends, Megan and Robe, Max sets up a variety of pranks throughout the film. These include traumatizing Troy by playing the main theme song of the fictional children's television show MacGoogles the Highlander Frog (which frightened him as a child), then trapping him in the gym with someone wearing a MacGoogles costume; instigating a fight between Dobbs and the Evil Ice Cream Man by stealing the coolant coil for his ice cream truck and Dobbs' handheld device; and ruining Jindrake's chances of becoming successor to the superintendent, Bobby "Crazy Legs" Knebworth (an alumnus who was a star football player for the school) by planting animal pheromones within his breath spray, instigating a food fight in the cafeteria in view of Knebworth, and later by sabotaging his television announcements by placing a cardboard cutout of Max mocking him.

After Max's missions are completed, Jindrake, Troy and Dobbs somehow find out that he was behind all the pranks he pulled off. Later, Max ends up ditching Megan and Robe's going-away party by accepting an invitation to a milkshake party hosted by his love interest, Jenna, causing a falling-out. Robe tells Max how Megan really feels about him, and then walks away telling Max that he hopes he enjoys his new life in Chicago. Max then calls Megan's house, telling her mother to relay to her that he is sorry for what happened. Taking Max's earlier advice to heart, his father announces that he quit his job and will start his own business, meaning that Max is not moving after all. Max freaks out at this news, and learns that other students at his school are suffering because of his actions.

Max confronts Jindrake, Troy, and Dobbs one final time. With the help of his schoolmates, Max throws Troy and Dobbs into the dumpster and squares off Jindrake from demolishing the animal shelter. Jindrake is fired from his job and faces serious criminal charges for manipulating the school budget in order to build his stadium after Max tricked him into publicly admitting to his crimes earlier. Max is just happy that the first week of school was over, even if it meant still having to deal with the Evil Ice Cream Man after ruining his van and business.

== Cast ==
- Alex D. Linz as Max Keeble, a junior seventh grade student attending the fictional John J. Curtis High School
- Larry Miller as Principal Elliot T. Jindrake, the greedy and tyrannical principal at Max's school who plans to close the animal shelter and build his opulent football stadium
- Jamie Kennedy as the Evil Ice Cream Man, an unnamed ice cream vendor who plans revenge on Max ever since the latter found a cockroach in a snow cone and his mother called the health department on him
- Zena Grey and Josh Peck as Megan and Robe, Max's two best friends
- Robert Carradine as Donald Keeble, Max's father
- Nora Dunn as Lily Keeble, Max's mother
- Clifton Davis as Superintendent Bobby "Crazy Legs" Knebworth, a former football player and the superintendent of the school district that Max's school is in
- Amy Hill as Ms. Phyllis Rangoon, Jindrake's secretary.
- Amber Valletta as Ms. Nicole Dingman, Max's science teacher.
- Veronica Alicino as Ms. Talia, Max's strict social studies teacher
- Noel Fisher as Troy McGinty one of Max's bullies who used to be his friend. Troy is scared of MacGoogles the Highlander Frog, a mascot for a fictional children's television show, after seeing Max's father dressed as him at Max's fourth birthday party.
- Orlando Brown as Dobbs, one of Max's bullies who is obsessed with regaining his millions of dollars after losing all of it at the age of 12
- Justin Berfield as Caption writer.
- Brooke Anne Smith as Jenna, Max's love interest
- Myra as Chelsea, Jenna's best friend.
- Dennis Haskins as Mr. Kohls, Max's music teacher.
- Chely Wright as Mrs. Styles, the homeroom teacher.
- Kyle Sullivan as Techie kid
- Jess Harnell as the voice of MacGoogles the Highlander Frog

Cameos

- Tony Hawk as himself.
- Lil' Romeo as himself.
- Marcus Hopson as Pizza parlor guy.

== Reception ==
=== Box office ===
Max Keeble's Big Move grossed $17.3 million in the United States and Canada and $1.3 million in other territories for a worldwide total of $18.6 million, against a production budget of $25 million. The film grossed $5.4 million in its opening weekend, finishing 7th at the box office. The film was released on VHS and DVD on June 18, 2002. While the film was released in 1.85:1 widescreen, all VHS and DVD copies release the film in 1.33:1 full screen.

=== Critical response ===
On review aggregation website Rotten Tomatoes, the film has an approval rating of 27% based on 55 reviews, and an average rating of 4.3/10. The site's critical consensus reads: "Max Keeble may be fun for kids, but bland and unoriginal for adults." On Metacritic, the film has a weighted average score 40 out of 100, based on 19 critics, indicating "mixed or average reviews". Audiences polled by CinemaScore gave the film an average grade of "B" on an A+ to F scale.
