= Alex D. Linz =

American former actor (born 1989)

- Born: Alexander David Linz; January 3, 1989 (age 37); Santa Barbara, California, U.S.
- Other name: Alex Linz
- Citizenship: United States
- Education: Alexander Hamilton High School
- Alma mater: University of California, Berkeley (BA); University of California, Los Angeles (MURP)
- Occupations: Actor; Legal researcher
- Years active: 1995-2007 (acting)
- Known for: Home Alone 3; Max Keeble's Big Move
- Height: 5 ft 9 in (175 cm)

Alexander David Linz (born January 3, 1989 in Santa Barbara, California) is an American researcher and former child actor who starred in several late 1990s and early 2000s films and television series. His film roles include Home Alone 3 (1997) and Max Keeble's Big Move (2001).

== Early life, family and education ==
Linz was born the son of Deborah (née Baltaxe) and Dr. Daniel Linz, an attorney and Dr. professor of communication at the University of California, Santa Barbara, respectively. He has two younger sisters, Lily Alice and Livia. Linz's parents are divorced and he lived with his mother. Linz is Jewish, and had a bar mitzvah ceremony. Linz attended Alexander Hamilton High School in Los Angeles, during which time he was the lead singer of a garage band, The Fez Armada. After his career as a child actor, Linz attended college at University of California, Berkeley, where he became involved in a campus improv group, Jericho!. Linz graduated with a Bachelor of Arts degree in 2011. He earned his master's degree in urban and regional planning at University of California, Los Angeles in 2017.

== Career ==
Linz made his professional acting debut as Jason in a 1995 episode of the CBS television series Cybill. He subsequently appeared in several television productions, including playing Phillip Chancellor IV in a 1995 episode of the CBS soap opera The Young and the Restless in 1995 for a short period of time. Linz was cast as Sammy Parker, the son of Michelle Pfeiffer's character, Melanie, in the 1996 feature film One Fine Day. His big breakthrough came when he was cast as Alex Pruitt, the younger brother of Scarlett Johansson's character, Molly, in the 1997 Christmas film Home Alone 3, but the film received a lukewarm response due to lacking a reprising cast that represented the McCallister family of the two previous blockbuster Home Alone feature films. In 2001, Linz played the title character in the Disney film Max Keeble's Big Move, which received mixed reviews and was a box-office failure, grossing only $18.6 million worldwide against a $25 million budget. As of 2023, Linz is working as a legal researcher in Los Angeles and he is also a lead science instructor.

== Filmography ==
Film

Year	Title	Role	Notes
1996	The Siege at Ruby Ridge	Young Sammy Weaver	Uncredited
1996	The Cable Guy	Tony	Uncredited
1996	One Fine Day	Sammy Parker	
1997	Home Alone 3	Alex Pruitt	
1998-2002	The Wacky Adventures of Ronald McDonald	Franklin (voice)	Direct-to-video
1999	Tarzan	Young Tarzan (voice)	
1999	My Brother the Pig	Freud	
2000	Bruno	Bruno Battaglia	
2000	Titan A.E.	Young Cale Tucker (voice)	
2000	Bounce	Scott Janello	
2001	Max Keeble's Big Move	Max Keeble	
2001	Race to Space	Wilhelm 'Billy' von Huber	
2002	Red Dragon	Young Francis Dolarhyde (voice)	
2005	The Amateurs	Billy	
2007	Order Up	Busboy	
2007	Choose Connor	Owen Norris	

=== TV ===
Year	Title	Role	Notes
1995	The Young and the Restless	Phillip Chancellor IV #6	1 episode
1995	Cybill	Jason	Episode: "The Replacements"
1995	Lois & Clark: The New Adventures of Superman	Jesse Stipanovic	Episode: "Chip Off the Old Clark"
1995	Aaahh!!! Real Monsters	Son, Little Boy (voice)	Episode: "Krumm Rises to the Top"
1995	Step by Step	Howie	Episode: "The Fight Before Christmas"
1995	Vanished	Teddy	TV film
1996	The Uninvited	Jonathan Johnson	TV film
2000	Touched by an Angel	Joey Hauk	Episode: "Stealing Hope"
2000	ER	Dennis	Episode: "Mars Attacks"
2001	The Jennie Project	Andrew Archibald	Television film
2001-2002	Providence	Pete Calcatera	20 episodes
2002	Hey Arnold!	Arnold Shortman (voice)	2 episodes
2003	Full-Court Miracle	Alex Schlotsky	TV film
2003	Exit 9	Richie Sommerset	TV film
2004	Crossballs: The Debate Show	PSA Kid	Episode: "Drugs"
2004	Jack & Bobby	Hunter	Episode: "The Kindness of Strangers"

Other appearances

Video games
Year	Title	Role	Notes
1999	Tarzan	Young Tarzan	Voice
2000	Nicktoons Racing	Arnold	Voice
