= Adam Abbou =

English actor

- Born: Liverpool, England
- Occupations: Actor, Model
- Years active: 2013–present

Adam Abbou is a British stage, television and film actor and model. His television credits include Waterloo Road (2023) and This City Is Ours (2025-2026).

== Career ==
Born in Liverpool, Abbou appeared as a child actor on stage in 2016 in a UK and Ireland tour in the title role in Billy Elliot the Musical, at the age of 12 years-old.

Abbou had an early television role in Sue Johnstone Birkenhead-set television series Being Eileen. He also had small roles in long-running television series Casualty and drama series Time. Abbou had a first recurring television role portraying troubled teenager Danny Lewis in two series of BBC One television series Waterloo Road until leaving the show in series 12 episodes broadcast in 2023. Abbou appeared alongside David Duchovny and Jack Whitehall in thriller series Malice (2025). He portrayed Freddie Banks in two series of Liverpool-set crime drama series This City Is Ours from 2025, with an expanded role in the second series broadcast in 2026.

Abbou portrayed Jasper Brown in the film Marked Men: Rule + Shaw (2025).

== Personal life ==
Raised in Anfield, Liverpool, Abbou is of Moroccan descent. He also works as a model.

== Filmography ==
Year	Title	Role	Notes
2013	Being Eileen	Tyler	1 episode
2021	Time	Liam	1 episode
2021	A Banquet	Caleb	
2022	The Rising	Danny	1 episode
2023	Waterloo Road	Danny Lewis	14 episodes
2025	Marked Men: Rule + Shaw	Jasper Brown	
2025	Malice	Joel	2 episodes
2025–2026	This City Is Ours	Freddie Banks	13 episodes
