= The Cure (2026 film) =

2026 horror film by Nancy Leopardi

- VOD poster
- Directed by: Nancy Leopardi
- Written by: Jonathan Bernstein; James Greer
- Produced by: John Ierardi; Rock Jacobs; Nancy Leopardi; Natalie Marciano; Bo Youngblood
- Starring: Samantha Cochran; David Dastmalchian; Ashley Greene; Sydney Taylor; Tyler Lawrence Gray; Alex Veadov
- Cinematography: Andrew Russo
- Edited by: Anders Hoffmann
- Music by: Roy Mayorga
- Production companies: Indy Entertainment; Showdown Productions; Popternative Pictures; Rebel of America
- Distributed by: Signature Entertainment; VRC Films; Vertical; Front Row Filmed Entertainment; Première TV Distribution; World Pictures
- Release dates: March 20, 2026 (Limited); March 21, 2026 (MFF)
- Running time: 91 minutes
- Country: United States
- Language: English

The Cure is a 2026 American sci-fi horror film written by Jonathan Bernstein, James Greer and directed by Nancy Leopardi. It stars Samantha Cochran, David Dastmalchian, Ashley Greene, Sydney Taylor, Tyler Lawrence Gray and Alex Veadov. The film follows an adopted 16-year-old who discovers her biotech billionaire parents are harvesting her blood.

== Premise ==
The story follows a teenage girl named Ally, adopted as a child and now 16. She’s been struggling with a strange, undiagnosed illness her whole life. As she digs into her health issues, she stumbles onto a disturbing secret: her adoptive parents, both powerful billionaires in the biotech world, have been using her body as a source of blood for experiments tied to their company’s shadowy projects.

== Cast ==
- Samantha Cochran as Ally Braun
- David Dastmalchian as Jeff Braun
- Ashley Greene as Georgia Braun
- Sydney Taylor as Brooke Amandine
- Tyler Lawrence Gray as Robbie Amandine
- Alex Veadov as Dr. Volker
- Dylan Flashner as Dr. Morrissey
- Marisa Echeverria as Margita
- Bunny Levine as Mrs. Polanski

== Production ==
- Director/Producer: Nancy Leopardi. She describes it as “a satirical take on the modern billionaire class cloaked in a crowd-pleasing thriller” made “in the tradition of classic horror and sci-fi films that are inspired by terrifying socio-political realities and advances in bio-technology.” She cites Ex Machina, A.I., and Videodrome as influences.
- Writers: Jonathan Bernstein & James Greer.
- Producers: Nancy Leopardi, John Ierardi, Rock Jacobs, Natalie Marciano, and Bo Youngblood.
- Executive Producers: Steve Bencich, Michael Breen, Luke Daniels, and Michael Leon Cassault.
- Cinematographer: Andrew Russo, Composer: Roy Mayorga, Editor: Anders Hoffman.
- U.S. rights were acquired by Vertical Entertainment for a 2026 theatrical + VOD release, with international sales handled by Vaneast Pictures at AFM. Signature Entertainment is handling the UK release.

== Release ==
Vertical Entertainment acquired U.S. rights and the film had a limited theatrical release on March 20, 2026, it was also premiered at the 2026 Manchester Film Festival on March 21, 2026, was released in VOD on April 13, 2026 and scheduled to release in Russia on June 11, 2026.

== Reception ==
Leslie Felperin of The Guardian gave the rating of 3 out of 5, and she wrote: Maybe budget was a problem, because for all the fuss made here about the central family’s fabulous wealth, the film’s limited locations and low lighting seem to be hiding a fundamental lack of coin. At least the younger cast members have charisma and spark which buoys things along nicely.

Tom Mimnagh of FilmHounds gave the film a mixed reviews and a rating of 3 out of 5 stars and wrote: The Cure is a bit of a mess. It contains some lofty ideas that never quite reach their full potential in terms of a satire on the uber-rich and the wellness industry.
