= Daisy Jelley =

English model, actress, and Internet personality

- Born: Daisy Francesca Jelley; 4 April 2000 (age 26)
- Years active: 2010–present

Daisy Francesca Jelley (born 4 April 2000) is an English model, actress, and Internet personality.

== Early life and education ==
Jelley grew up in Walton-on-Thames, Surrey. Her mother is a hairdresser, and her father sells hair products and performs in local music gigs. Her older sister is a food and travel writer and editor, while her younger brother also models.

Jelley attended Rydens Enterprise School and then Hurtwood House, completing her A Levels in 2018. She also joined the Elmbridge Youth Theatre.

== Career ==
When she was 10, Jelley convinced her parents to let her sign with Kids London. Then in 2013 at age 13, Jelley was scouted by Select Model Management at Clothes Show Live.

Jelley began uploading videos to TikTok in late 2019, and has since amassed over 1 million followers on the platform and tens of millions of views. She appeared in music videos for Cassa Jackson and HRVY in 2020 and 2021, as well as the short film Better Get Better with Aliyah Odoffin. She landed modeling gigs with the likes of Coach, Charlotte Tilbury, Tommy Hilfiger, Miss Selfridge, and Pepe Jeans with Brooklyn Beckham.

In 2023, Jelley made her feature film debut as Gemma in How to Have Sex, which premiered at Cannes and won the Prix Un Certain Regard, as well as her television debut in an episode of the Acorn TV series London Kills. This was followed in 2024 by roles as Amber in the Amazon Prime film How to Date Billy Walsh and Poppy Hepple-Cartwright the Netflix series Geek Girl starring Emily Carey. She also appeared in the VR miniseries The Faceless Lady. In 2025, Jelley appeared in Nick Cassavetes' Marked Men: Rule + Shaw.

Jelley starred in the 2026 indie films Feed alongside Clinton Liberty and The Hoarder. Jelley is set to star in the Netflix teen drama Poser and adaptation of the sports romance novel Icebreaker.

== Filmography ==
=== Film ===
Year	Title	Role	Notes
2021	Better Get Better	Taylor	Short film
2023	How to Have Sex	Gemma	
2024	How to Date Billy Walsh	Amber	Amazon Prime film
2025	Marked Men: Rule + Shaw	Sierra	
2026	Feed	Nessa	
2026	The Hoarder	Melissa Knowles	

=== Television ===
Year	Title	Role	Notes
2023	London Kills	Elaine Latimer	Episode: "Wake-up Call"
2024	The Faceless Lady		VR miniseries
2024	Geek Girl	Poppy Hepple-Cartwright	8 episodes
2024	Miss Fallaci	Jayne Mansfield	
TBA	Icebreaker	Anastasia “Stassie” Allen	Lead role

=== Music video ===
Song	Year	Artist	Notes
"He's No You"	2020	Cassa Jackson	
"One Day Two Nights"	2021	HRVY	
