= Miss Fallaci =

Italian television series

- Written by: Viola Rispoli; Miriam Leone; Thomas Grieves; Laura Grimaldi; Alice Urciuolo; Alessandra Gonnella; Diego Loreggian
- Directed by: Luca Ribuoli; Giacomo Martelli; Alessandra Gonnella
- Starring: Miriam Leone; Jóhannes Haukur Jóhannesson; Gina Bramhill; Debi Mazar; Francesco Colella; Francesca Agostini; Maurizio Lastrico; Daisy Jelley; Isabella Tabarini; Axel Gallois
- Country of origin: Italy
- Original language: Italian
- No. of seasons: 1
- No. of episodes: 8

Production
- Producers: Santo Versace; Gianluca Curti; Diego Loreggian; Angela Salmaso
- Production companies: Minerva Pictures RedString Paramount Television International Studios

Original release
- Network: Rai 1
- Release: 19 December 2024 (Australia); 25 February 2025 (Italy)

Miss Fallaci is a 2024 Italian television series on RAI, production by Paramount Television International Studios and Minerva Pictures in association with RedString. Created by Alessandra Gonnella and Diego Loreggian, directed by Luca Ribuoli, Giacomo Martelli and Alessandra Gonnella it is set to star Miriam Leone as journalist Oriana Fallaci. It has production by Santo Versace, Gianluca Curti, Diego Loreggian and Angela Salmaso. Viola Rispoli and Tom Grieves are lead writers.

== Synopsis ==
Set in the late 1950s, this season follows the early career of Oriana Fallaci, when she was still known as "the girl from the movies" and worked as a reporter for the Italian weekly magazine L’Europeo. It was during this time that Fallaci turned her first trip to the United States into a unique opportunity, meeting extraordinary figures and painting a sharp, often raw and ironic, portrait of American culture and the reality behind the glamorous façade of Hollywood. These years were also marked by deep personal turmoil, including an intense and troubled relationship with fellow journalist Alfredo Pieroni. This relationship, full of passion but also insecurities and fears, eventually dragged Fallaci into a spiral of self-destruction. Above all, it was a period when a young woman with extraordinary determination and talent discovered her true mission: to tell the truth. And she realized that to do so, all she needed was her most powerful weapon: her voice, unique and distinctive.

== Cast ==
- Miriam Leone as Oriana Fallaci
- Jóhannes Haukur Jóhannesson as Orson Welles
- Maurizio Lastrico as Alfredo Pieroni
- Francesca Agostini as Giovanna Corsi
- Francesco Colella as Attilio Battistini
- Leonardo Lidi as Carlo Morganti
- Isabella Tabarini as Rita
- Ken Duken as Albert Gordon
- Debi Mazar as Louella Parsons
- Rosanna Gentili as Tosca Fallaci
- Giordano De Plano as Edoardo Fallaci
- Daisy Jelley as Jayne Mansfield
- Davide Tucci as Frank Sinatra
- Philipp Christopher as Arthur Miller
- Hannah Chinn as Shirley Maclaine
- Axel B. Steinmueller as Henry Kissinger
- Axel Gallois as Jacques Laroux

== Production ==
Paramount+ commissioned the series made by Minerva Pictures in October 2021. In February 2023 it was revealed to be an eight-part series with Viola Rispoli as lead writer and Santo Versace, Gianluca Curti, Diego Loreggian and Angela Salmaso as producers.

=== Casting ===
Joining the cast is Jóhannes Haukur Jóhannesson who is set to feature as Orson Welles.

=== Filming ===
Filming began on the series in Italy in 2023. Filming locations include Rome.

== Broadcast ==
The series premiered at the 19th Rome Film Festival on 21 October 2024, and was projected to be screened in Italy on 25 February 2025.
