= American Born Chinese (TV series) =

2023 American action comedy television series

- Genre: Fantasy; Action comedy
- Created by: Kelvin Yu
- Based on: American Born Chinese by Gene Luen Yang
- Showrunner: Kelvin Yu
- Starring: Ben Wang; Yeo Yann Yann; Chin Han; Ke Huy Quan; Jimmy Liu; Sydney Taylor; Daniel Wu; Michelle Yeoh
- Music by: Wendy Wang
- Country of origin: United States
- Original languages: English; Mandarin
- No. of seasons: 1
- No. of episodes: 8

Production
- Executive producers: Kelvin Yu; Destin Daniel Cretton; Asher Goldstein; Jake Kasdan; Melvin Mar; Erin O'Malley; Gene Luen Yang
- Producer: Samantha Brooks
- Cinematography: Brett Pawlak; Alan Poon
- Editors: Gina Sansom; Yu Jung Hou; Jane Choi Albanez; Louis Lee; Matthew Barbato
- Running time: 29-43 minutes
- Production companies: Mister John; The Detective Agency; Family Owned; 20th Television

Original release
- Network: Disney+
- Release: May 24, 2023

American Born Chinese is an American fantasy action comedy television sitcom created by Kelvin Yu for Disney+. It follows tenth-grader Jin Wang (Ben Wang), who is struggling to fit in with his peers. When he is tasked with showing new exchange student Wei-Chen (Jimmy Liu) around, he is unexpectedly thrust into a battle between mythical Chinese gods, including Sun Wukong (Daniel Wu) and Guanyin (Michelle Yeoh). The series is based on the 2006 graphic novel American Born Chinese by Gene Luen Yang, who drew inspiration from his own adolescent years in the 1990s, incorporating elements from Chinese folk tales and mysticism found in the classic Chinese novel Journey to the West.

The series consists of eight episodes and premiered on Disney+ on May 24, 2023. It received generally positive reviews from critics. Commentators referred to it as one of the best offerings on Disney+ and praised the way it moved across cultural boundaries, its action sequences, and the performances of the cast, though criticism was aimed at its different plot from the source material and inaccuracies of Chinese mythological characters. In January 2024, the series was canceled after one season due to low viewership.

== Premise ==
American Born Chinese tells the story of teenager Jin Wang (played by Ben Wang), a son of Taiwanese immigrants, who for the most part is a typical high school student. He collects manga, tries to join the soccer team, and is on a journey dealing with his own identity as he tries to figure out who he is. One day, Wei-Chen (Jimmy Liu), an exchange student, arrives at Jin's school. Unlike Jin, Wei-Chen did not grow up in America, is loud and open by nature, and does not exhibit Jin's self-doubt and insecurities. At times, this causes Jin to feel embarrassed being associated with Wei-Chen.

Wei-Chen is revealed to be the son of Sun Wukong (portrayed by Daniel Wu), commonly known as the Monkey King, a legendary figure in Chinese literature. Wei-Chen had a dream that the mythical Fourth Scroll can stop an uprising against Heaven. The dream also told him that an ordinary teenager is destined to aid him in his search. So Wei-Chen stole his father's magical staff and is now, disguised as a high schooler, searching for the scroll in earthly California, convinced that Jin is the ordinary teenager from his prophetic dream.

== Cast and characters ==
=== Main ===
- Ben Wang as Jin Wang, an American born Chinese 10th grader at Sierra Mona High School
- Yeo Yann Yann as Christine Wang, Jin's mother
- Chin Han as Simon Wang, Jin's father
- Ke Huy Quan as Jamie Yao, a former actor known for playing the accident-prone Freddy Wong in the sitcom Beyond Repair; a fictionalized version of Quan, Wong is based on Quan's character of Short Round from Indiana Jones and the Temple of Doom
- Jimmy Liu as Sun Wei-Chen, the son of Sun Wukong
- Sydney Taylor as Amelia, Jin's love interest
- Daniel Wu as Sun Wukong, a Chinese immortal and trickster known as the "Monkey King"
- Michelle Yeoh as Guanyin, the Goddess of Mercy

=== Recurring ===
- Mahi Alam as Anuj, Jin's best friend outside of soccer who is a part of the Cosplay Club at Sierra Mona High School
- Stony Blyden as Andy, one of Jin's soccer friends
- David Bloom as Josh, another one of Jin's soccer friends
- Justin Jarzombek as Travis
- Brian Huskey as Mr. Larkins, Jin and Amelia's Biology 2 teacher at Sierra Mona High School
- Larry Bates as Coach Garrett, the boys' soccer coach at Sierra Mona High School
- Sophie Reynolds as Ruby, Amelia's friend
- Josh Duvendeck as Danny / Marty K. Morris
- Leonard Wu as Niu Mowang, commonly known as Bull Demon
- Ronny Chieng (Note: Ronny Chieng is credited as "Special Guest Star" but is a recurring cast member.) as Ji Gong, commonly known as the Mad Monk

=== Notable guest stars ===
- Rosalie Chiang as Suzy Nakamura, a student activist and the president of the Culture Club at Sierra Mona High School
- Brian Le as Zhu Bajie, Monkey's former companion known as "Pigsy"
- Lisa Lu as Ni Yang
- Poppy Liu as Princess Iron Fan, wife of Bull Demon
- James Hong as Jade Emperor, ruler of the Celestial Court
- Jimmy O. Yang as Ao Guang, commonly known as the Dragon King, whom Monkey humiliated in his youth
- Stephanie Hsu as Shiji Niangniang

== Episodes ==
No.	Title	Directed by	Written by	Original release date	Prod. code
1	"What Guy Are You"	Destin Daniel Cretton	Kelvin Yu & Charles Yu	May 24, 2023	1HXZ01
Jin Wang begins tenth grade with the intent to join the soccer team, get back with his friend Anuj, and romantically pursue Amelia. His plans are derailed when the principal sets him up with Sun Wei-Chen, a new student who is all too eager to spend time with Jin. Jin discovers that they share an interest in the fictional show Kugo Ren Saga. Wei-Chen is actually the son of Sun Wukong, the Monkey King, and had stolen his famous magical staff to search for the fourth scroll to help defeat Niu Mowang, the Bull Demon, in an upcoming war. Despite Jin's attempts to distance himself from Wei-Chen, an accident suddenly turns him into an insensitive and racist viral meme based on the sitcom "Beyond Repair". Believing that it was fellow soccer player Travis who posted the meme, Jin injures him during practice, but Wei-Chen deduces that it was actually team captain Greg. Wei-Chen is confronted by his father within the school and a fight breaks out, ending with Guanyin arriving and approving of Wei-Chen's decisions. Jin learns that Wei-Chen slipped an action figure into his backpack.
2	"A Monkey on a Quest"	Dinh Thai	Vali Chandrasekaran	May 24, 2023	1HXZ02
Guanyin moves in with Wei-Chen as his "aunt" while Jin makes amends with Anuj before he reveals that Suzy Nakamura, the head of the culture club, is protesting against the offensive viral video. Wei-Chen informs Suzy that Greg was behind it and they spread the news all over the school. Greg approaches Jin that he can get him on the soccer team if he tells everyone that they are cool. Jin's father, Simon, is nervous about approaching his boss for a promotion at work. The two of them end up bonding over their love of Bon Jovi, only for Simon to learn that he is retiring. Simon's wife Christine suggests that he try to get his new position. After failing to help clean the equipment room, Jin tells everyone at the school to forgive Greg. Suzy is disappointed in him, but respects his honesty. Wei-Chen discovers that Zhu Bajie, Pigsy, is at the school searching for the staff and the two fight. However, Jin walks in on them and gets knocked out, forcing Zhu Baijie to leave.
3	"Rockstar Status"	Dennis Liu	Warren Hsu Leonard	May 24, 2023	1HXZ03
Wei-Chen tells Jin about his family and Jin reluctantly believes him. Wei-Chen then asks that Jin meet Guanyin and he accepts, only to also agree to a soccer party after school. Jin goes to the party where after telling Travis his personal secrets is tasked to confront them in order to win a pair of golden cleats. Meanwhile, Christine discovers that her herbal store is closing and buys a box of herbs. At the church, she begins to sell some of them and shares the profits with the store. Upon learning that they need more money and that they have more herbs, Christine decides to help them. Niu Mowang confronts Guanyin and they fight resulting in Guanyin using a mirror to defeat him. Jin's final task is to toilet paper their rival school's statue. Wei-Chen agrees to help him on the condition he meet Guanyin. Afterwards, Niu Mowang steals the staff and Sun Wukong takes Wei-Chen home. Jin wins the golden cleats and returns home unaware of what is happening.
4	"Make a Splash"	Peng Zhang	Aaron Izek	May 24, 2023	1HXZ04
Jin goes to school the next day hailed as a hero, but begins to miss Wei-Chen. As Sun Wukong takes Wei-Chen home, he tells him that he does not want to be like him. In flashback styled after 70s Chinese dramas (including the opening credits styled after the TV series Monkey), Sun Wukong and Niu Mowang attend a party for the Gods. While Niu Mowang is shy and awkward, Sun Wukong is more extroverted and uses his skills to help them get into the party so that Niu Mowang can ask Ao Guang, the Dragon King, to become the next sage. While Niu Mowang manages to befriend Princess Iron Fan, his future wife, he fails to make an impact with the people attending. Instead, Sun Wukong gets up on stage and insults everyone about the award ceremony and smashes the heavenly peach. Ao Guang is impressed with his honesty and announces him the next sage. Sun Wukong tries to comfort Niu Mowang with the knowledge that he can get him in, but Niu Mowang denounces him and his confidence, ending their friendship. In the present, Sun Wukong decides to send Wei-Chen back, but Jin informs the latter that a whole month has passed.
5	"Abracadabra"	Johnson Cheng	Lawrence Dai	May 24, 2023	1HXZ05
Wei-Chen informs Jin about what happened and later meets Christine who shows him two halves of a jade necklace that strikes his fancy. Wei-Chen visits Ji Gong, the Mad Monk, who tells him that the secret to the fourth scroll lies in an object that represents warring factions that Wei-Chen realizes is Christine's necklace. Wei-Chen revisits Christine and her church group, but Ji Gong shows up to take them and Simon out for drinks and karaoke. Jin is studying biology with Amelia and initially ignores Wei-Chen until he learns from Christine where they are. He arrives at the restaurant where Simon reveals his intent to quit his job after getting passed over while Christine reveals that she used up half their life savings. Ji Gong attempts to flee with the necklace, but Wei-Chen gets it back, only to refuse to hand it back to Jin whom he accuses of trying to avoid him. Elsewhere, Jamie Yao, the actor who plays Freddy Wong in the 90's sitcom Beyond Repair, has become a repair man.
6	"Hot Stuff"	Lucy Liu	Kai Yu Wu	May 24, 2023	1HXZ06
Wei-Chen is saddened over his fall out with Jin and Guanyin decides to take the jade pendant to Shiji Niangniang to see if it contains the clue to the fourth scroll. Jin convinces Simon and Christine to talk, but they make no progress. Amelia notices that Jin is reluctant to talk about Wei-Chen until she learns that it is his birthday and decides to throw an impromptu birthday party at the local bowling alley. She also invites Wei-Chen who tries to apologize for lying to him and his family. Ji Gong suddenly arrives to confront Wei-Chen and Jin and are soon joined by Niu Mowang and Sun Wukong who break out into a fight. Sha Wujing, also known as Sandy, arrives and knocks out Ji Gong before going to help Sun Wukong, but both are defeated and Niu Mowang captures Sun Wukong. Jin manages to send everyone home before learning from Wei-Chen what happened. In a mid-credits scene, Jamie is finishing his class and gets a call from his agent about a Beyond Repair reunion, but is reluctant over repeating his infamous catchphrase "What could go Wong?"
7	"Beyond Repair"	Erin O'Malley	Lana Cho	May 24, 2023	1HXZ07
Jin and Wei-Chen go to see Guanyin who informs them that the jade pendant was just a regular pendant. Wei-Chen turns Jin away as he is no longer needed. Jin begins to suspect that his parents are splitting, as at school, he becomes distant and gets into an altercation with the school mascot. While waiting outside the office, Jin watches a video of Jamie attending the Beyond Repair reunion where he gives an open and honest response about how he wishes to be seen by audiences: a hero to anyone. The principal ignorantly tries to understand Jin's predicament and makes racist comments towards Jin's parents, but both Christine and Simon set her straight before leaving with their relationship repaired. Sun Wukong tries to appeal to Ji Gong and Niu Mowang, but supposedly to no avail. Wei-Chen arrives to rescue his father where Niu Mowang realizes the truth about the jade pendant. Ji Gong has a change of heart and rescues Wei-Chen, but they are unable to rescue Sun Wukong as Niu Mowang burns Ji Gong's paintings and seemingly kills Sun Wukong.
8	"The Fourth Scroll"	Destin Daniel Cretton	Kelvin Yu	May 24, 2023	1HXZ08
Jin gets a message in a dream from Guanyin that the Autumn Equinox is near, which is when Niu Mowang will enact his plan to destroy not just Heaven, but Earth as well. Jin manages to recruit Anuj to help him locate Wei-Chen where they see him in his true monkey form. Realizing that Niu Mowang's plan is similar to his depictions in manga, they figure out that he will activate the staff's magic at the soccer tournament that night. Meanwhile, Simon and Christine try looking for the pendant and discover Sun Wukong, reviving him back to health via a jar of herbal tea Guanyin blessed. Afterwards, they decide to head to the game. Jin has a brief encounter with Amelia where the two of them admit their love to each other. Jin then stages a cosplay sketch with Anuj and they draw out Niu Mowang as a fight between him and Wei-Chen breaks out. Jin saves heaven and earth by taking the staff's blast and emerges unharmed, revealing that he is the fourth scroll. After Sun Wukong arrives and incapacitates Niu Mowang, Wei-Chen says goodbye to Jin, but as the latter enters his house, he finds his parents missing and Princess Iron Fan, who demands that he come with her if he wants to see his parents again.

== Production ==
=== Development ===
Gene Luen Yang's graphic novel entitled American Born Chinese was an adaptation of the Chinese classic novel Journey to the West, and according to series creator Kelvin Yu, the characters belong in the same category as other famous Disney legends such as the characters from the Marvel universe and Disney's own princesses. Yang was influenced by his own experiences as a Chinese American teenager growing up in the 1990s' middle America between two cultures. The graphic novel became landmark literature for Asian American millennials when it was published in 2006, and Yang was approached by Hollywood for the first time in 2007. It turned out that the reason for the initial interest was a search for properties that would promote "the word China or Chinese" leading up to the 2008 Summer Olympics in Beijing, said Yang. Throughout the years, there would be inquiries but Yang observed that "the world needed to change in order for there to be an appetite for a story about an Asian American protagonist." Then Yang met Fresh Off the Boat producer Melvin Mar who introduced him to Kelvin Yu (Bob's Burgers). Yu was aware of the difficulties of bringing the graphic novel to life onscreen but presented suggestions and ideas about how to expand the story and work with the complex plot line in a way that would speak to a new generation.

On October 4, 2021, it was reported that Disney+ had greenlit the adaptation of Yang's graphic novel and ordered it straight to series with Destin Daniel Cretton attached to direct. Yu and his brother Charles Yu were announced as writers of the series. Asian-American fashion designers Prabal Gurung and Phillip Lim joined the production in April 2022 to work alongside costume designer Joy Cretton, and in May 2022, Lucy Liu revealed on social media that she had been added as a director. Melvin Mar, Kelvin Yu, and Gene Luen Yang would go on to serve as executive producers on the series. On January 5, 2024, Disney+ canceled the series after one season.

=== Casting ===
In February 2022, it was reported that Michelle Yeoh, Ben Wang, Yeo Yann Yann, Chin Han, Daniel Wu, Ke Huy Quan, Jim Liu, and Sydney Taylor were cast in starring roles. Stephanie Hsu joined the cast of the series in May, playing Shiji Niangniang, with Poppy Liu added in June. The recurring cast, including Hsu and Liu, was announced in February 2023.

American Born Chinese brought the cast of the 2022 film Everything Everywhere All at Once back together, although the reunion wasn't planned. Principal photography had wrapped by the time Everything Everywhere All at Once was released and gained popularity internationally. Yeoh, who plays the Chinese deity Guanyin, had come on board after receiving a call from director Destin Cretton. Quan, who plays Freddy Wong, and producer Melvin Mar already knew each other. When Quan was offered the role, he initially passed on it due to fear, telling the creative team "that this is the type of portrayal that we do not want to see in 2023," but after conversations with the team, he learned that as the series progresses, the audience would "get to meet the actor who plays Freddy Wong and understand the struggles that he went through — and also what it means to have this type of stereotypical portrayal of Asians, and what it does to a normal kid like Jin Wang (Ben Wang)."

=== Filming ===
Principal photography began in Los Angeles on February 8, 2022, and wrapped on July 6, 2022. The majority of the exterior shots were filmed in Los Angeles County, California, with well-known landmarks such as Los Angeles County Museum of Art, Griffith Park, the La Brea Tar Pits, the Los Angeles Zoo, the Natural History Museum of Los Angeles County, and the Arboretum of Los Angeles featured in sequences. The city of Altadena also provided a backdrop for the series. Reportedly, the production used a real high school or college as base camp for scenes taking place at the fictional Sierra Mona High School.

=== Music ===
The score for the show was composed by Wendy Wang and released on May 26, 2023. The soundtrack blends contemporary rap, catchy pop songs, and upbeat tracks that set the tone of the multi diverse and multi cultural themes of the show as it explores Jin's journey.

American Born Chinese [Original Soundtrack]
No.	Title	Length
1.	"Forest Chase"	1:04
2.	"Plan to Attack"	0:45
3.	"Beyond Repair Theme"	0:29
4.	"Father Son Fight"	3:03
5.	"With Respect"	1:28
6.	"Soccer Check"	0:38
7.	"Bull Demon"	1:28
8.	"Why So Mad"	1:25
9.	"Sun Wukong Opening"	0:47
10.	"Ribbon Dance"	1:32
11.	"After Party"	0:57
12.	"Sun Wukong Curtain Call"	0:19
13.	"Fourth Scroll Story"	1:33
14.	"So That's Your Plan"	0:54
15.	"Bowling Alley Fight"	2:29
16.	"Join Us or Die Trying"	2:45
17.	"Epic Consequences"	1:46
18.	"Get Your Pendant Back"	1:14
19.	"Hidden in Manga"	1:01
20.	"Our First Apartment"	1:31
21.	"Power Comes from Within"	1:31
22.	"Children Are Like a Mirror"	1:20
23.	"Not as Buds"	1:22
24.	"It's Starting"	2:03
25.	"Battle for the 4th Scroll"	5:54
26.	"Wukong Shows Up"	1:26
27.	"Goodbye"	1:05
Total length:		42:12

== Release ==
American Born Chinese had its world premiere at South by Southwest on March 15, 2023, with the first two episodes screening at the Paramount Theatre in Austin, Texas. Cast members in attendance included Ben Wang, Daniel Wu, Chin Han and Sydney Taylor, with executive producers Kelvin Yu, Melvin Mar and Gene Luen Yang also present. The series premiered on Disney+ on May 24, 2023. In the United States the series was also scheduled to stream in Hulu, The Roku Channel and YouTube TV, and broadcast on ABC on June 24, 2023.

The show also had an early screening at the White House, hosted by Joe Biden.

== Reception ==
=== Audience viewership ===
On May 4, 2023, according to Jordan Williams of Screen Rant, "American Born Chinese recorded over 12.2 million attention signals online while ranking fifth on both Facebook and YouTube for the most engagement of May 2023 releases, according to Diesel Labs' data."

=== Critical response ===
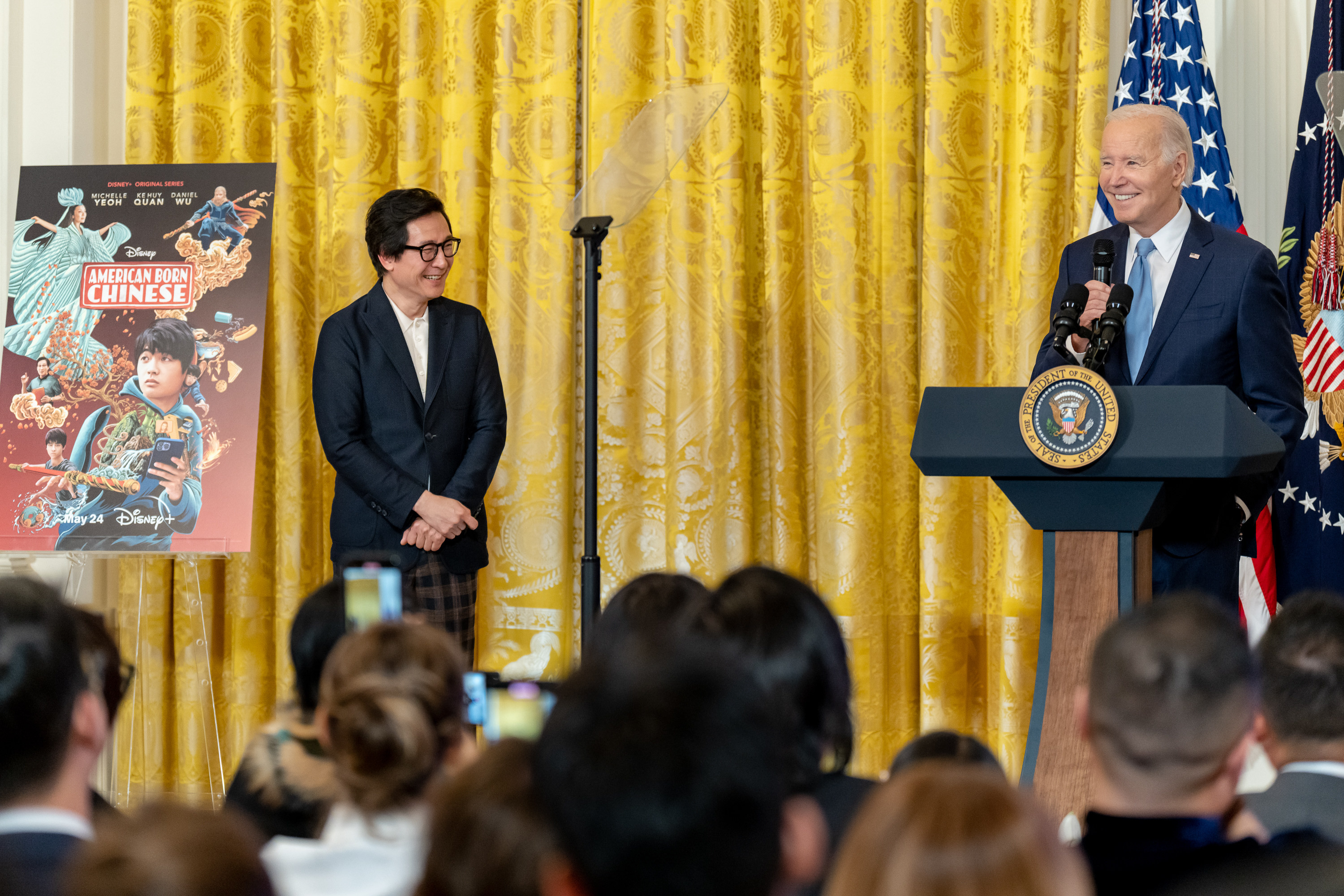
U.S. President Joe Biden and actor Ke Huy Quan at the screening of American Born Chinese in the White House, as part of Asian American and Pacific Islander Heritage Month (May 2023)

The review aggregator website Rotten Tomatoes reported a 94% approval rating with an average rating of 7.4/10, based on 53 critic reviews. The website's critics consensus reads, "Jam-packed with inventive flourishes and grounded by lovable actors, American Born Chinese musters epic elements from Chinese mythology to tell a deeply relatable coming of age story." Metacritic, which uses a weighted average, assigned a score of 73 out of 100 based on 28 critics, indicating "generally favorable reviews".

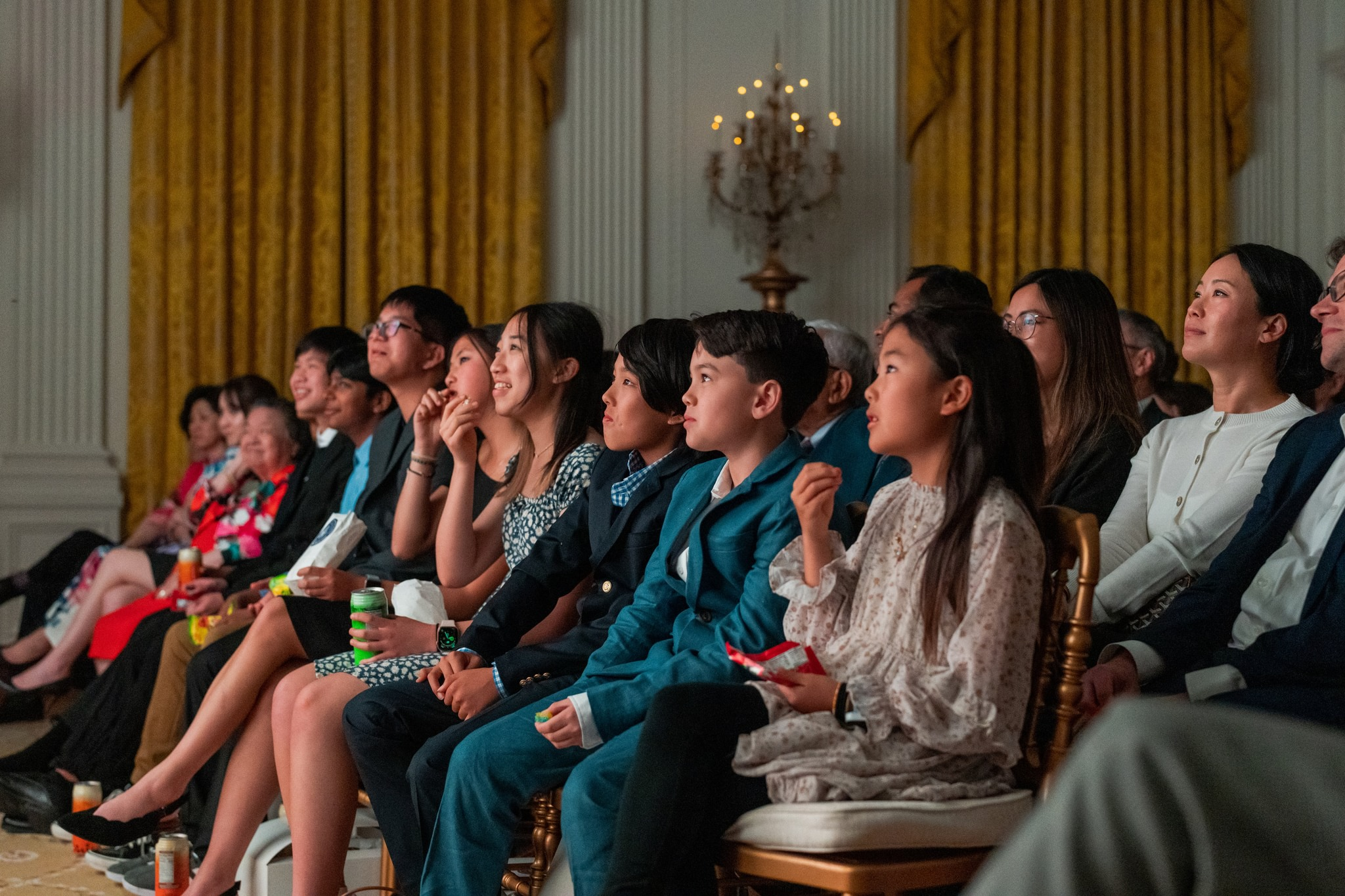
Asian American and Pacific Islander audience at the screening of American Born Chinese in the White House (May 2023)

Susana Polo of Polygon praised the show for the way it differs from the graphic novel, saying, "American Born Chinese shows a remarkable understanding of how to keep the spirit of a story while it's retrofitted for another medium and modern audience of young viewers," described the series as "clever, modern, serious, and funny all together," while complimented the performances of the cast. Joel Keller of Decider stated, "While it took a bit of time to get our bearings with regards to what's going on in the Heavenly Realm, we still enjoyed the first episode of American Born Chinese because of the earthly part of the story, as well as the well-done action sequences." Mike Hale of The New York Times asserted that American Born Chinese was "easy to watch but just as easy not to watch," saying it "strives to charm you in ways that may work or may make you wince from their familiarity."

Kristen Baldwin of Entertainment Weekly gave American Born Chinese an A− and described it as an "inviting blend of heartfelt coming-of-age humor and exhilarating martial-arts action." William Quant of IGN gave the series a grade of 8 out of 10, called it a "fun, bold reimagining of the American coming-of-age tale," and praised the performances of the cast. Kelly Lawler of USA Today gave the show a grade of 3 out of 4 stars, called it a "cuddly, Disneyfied version of those great supernatural teen dramas," stating, "It is the kind of show Disney Plus should really have been making all along: Too mature and expensive for Disney Channel but too family-friendly (and too expensive) for CW."

The series received criticism in Taiwan for changing the character of Wei-Chen's nationality from Taiwanese to Chinese. In Gene Luen Yang's graphic novel, Wei-Chen is from Taiwan, and actor Jimmy Liu, who portrays him in the series, is also Taiwanese. In the show, however, the character of Wei-Chen is Chinese, while the character of Jin Wang is Taiwanese.

=== Accolades ===
Year	Award	Category	Nominee(s)	Result	Ref.
2023	TCA Awards	Outstanding Achievement in Family Programming	American Born Chinese	Nominated	
2024	Astra TV Awards	Best Supporting Actor in a Streaming Series, Comedy	Ke Huy Quan	Nominated	
2024	Astra TV Awards	Best Supporting Actress in a Streaming Series, Comedy	Yeo Yann Yann	Nominated	
2024	Astra Creative Arts TV Awards	Best Casting in a Comedy Series	American Born Chinese	Nominated	
2024	Kidscreen Awards	Tweens/Teens Programming – Best New Series	American Born Chinese	Won	
2024	Critics' Choice Super Awards	Best Science Fiction/Fantasy Series, Limited Series or Made-for-TV Movie	American Born Chinese	Nominated	
2024	Critics' Choice Super Awards	Best Superhero Series, Limited Series or Made-for-TV Movie	American Born Chinese	Nominated	
2024	Critics' Choice Super Awards	Best Actress in a Science Fiction/Fantasy Series, Limited Series or Made-for-TV Movie	Michelle Yeoh	Nominated	
2024	Critics' Choice Super Awards	Best Actress in a Superhero Series, Limited Series or Made-for-TV Movie	Michelle Yeoh	Nominated	
2024	Critics' Choice Super Awards	Best Actor in a Superhero Series, Limited Series or Made-for-TV Movie	Ben Wang	Nominated	
2024	Writers Guild of America Awards	Children's Episodic, Long Form and Specials	Kelvin Yu and Charles Yu for ("What Guy Are You")	Nominated	
