= Sydney Taylor (actress) =

American actress

- Occupation: Actress
- Years active: 2012–present

Sydney Taylor is an American actress known for her roles as Amelia Taylor in Disney+ series American Born Chinese and as Lexi Hamilton in Prime Video Series Just Add Magic: Mystery City.

== Career ==
Taylor made her television debut in 2017 with a guest appearance on the series Nashville, where she played an 8th Grade Girl.

In 2018, she had a recurring role as Bronwyn in the ABC series Splitting Up Together.

In 2020, Taylor starred as Lexi Hamilton in the Amazon Prime series Just Add Magic: Mystery City, a spin-off of the original Just Add Magic series.

In 2023, she gained wider recognition for her role as Amelia in the Disney+ series American Born Chinese. The series is based on the graphic novel of the same name by Gene Luen Yang, and Taylor's character, Amelia, is described as a friendly "All-American" girl who is Jin's classmate and crush.

In January 2023, it was announced that she had been cast in Marked Men: Rule + Shaw, a young-adult romance film based on the book Rule by Jay Crownover. She will play the lead female role of Shaw Landon. The film wrapped production in late 2022. The film received a very limited theatrical release more than two years later, on January 22, 2025.

== Filmography ==
=== Film ===
Year	Title	Role	Notes
2025	Marked Men: Rule + Shaw	Shaw Landon	Main role
2025	Don't Be Shy	Margaret	Main role
2025	Dizzy	Dylan	Main role
2026	The Cure	Brooke Amandine	Supporting

=== Television ===
Year	Title	Role	Notes
2017	Nashville	8th Grade Girl	Episode: "Second Chances"
2018	Splitting Up Together	Bronwyn	Recurring role
2020	Just Add Magic: Mystery City	Lexi Hamilton	Main role
2023	American Born Chinese	Amelia	Main role
