= How to Date Billy Walsh =

2024 film by Alex Sanjiv Pillai

- Promotional poster
- Directed by: Alex Sanjiv Pillai
- Written by: Alexander J. Farrell; Greer Ellison
- Produced by: Matt Williams
- Starring: Sebastian Croft; Charithra Chandran; Nick Frost; Guz Khan; Lucy Punch; Kunal Nayyar; Tanner Buchanan
- Cinematography: Hamish Doyne-Ditmas
- Edited by: Matt Platts-Mills
- Music by: Rob Lord
- Production company: Future Artists Entertainment
- Distributed by: Amazon Prime Video
- Release date: 5 April 2024
- Running time: 100 minutes
- Country: United Kingdom
- Language: English

How to Date Billy Walsh is a 2024 British teen romantic comedy film directed by Alex Sanjiv Pillai. It follows a schoolboy named Archie, whose feelings for his childhood friend Amelia are put to the test when American transfer student Billy Walsh comes into their lives. The film was released on Amazon Prime Video on 5 April 2024.

== Plot ==
Archie Arnold has been in love with his best friend Amelia Brown since childhood, but has never been able to work up the courage to confess his feelings. Starting their final term of upper sixth at Heathbrook Academy, Archie prepares to finally declare his love for Amelia; his plans are interrupted by the arrival of American transfer student Billy Walsh who the entire student body, including Amelia and excluding Archie, is immediately smitten by.

Billy is instantly popular, becoming an A-star student and captain of both the swim and rugby team. Archie grows jealous at his accomplishments and how quickly Amelia falls in love with him.

Lilly and George, Archie's parents, are also close friends with Rupert, Amelia's father. During an evening the two families spend together, the couple encourage Rupert to take a chance at love again after the death of his wife Jules, who passed from sickness when Amelia was still young. They reveal to Rupert that after having been on the brink of divorce for years, they received help from a man called the "Love Doctor" to fall back in love, happier than ever. Amelia, overhearing this conversation, begs Archie to find the Love Doctor's phone number, believing he may help with her feelings for Billy.

Out of jealousy, Archie at first refuses to help. However, after an argument with Amelia leads her to be upset at him, he gives in and procures the number from his parents' contacts as an apology. She happily forgives him. Later, Archie switches the number for his own, and begins the pretence of being the "Love Doctor" with the help of his second mobile phone and a face-tuning app.

After overhearing popular girl Amber gossiping about her in the school bathrooms, Amelia is prompted to make herself over, switching her trousers and ponytail for short skirts, pigtails and lip-gloss. While failing to make her intended impression on Billy, a public altercation she has with Amber catches his attention and he asks Amelia out on a date. Archie, under the guise of being the Love Doctor, sabotages her with bad advice which she wordlessly heeds. Billy, put off by her rude behaviour, leaves the date early and states he has no interest in her anymore.

Devastated, Amelia makes a public apology via the school intercoms. She and Billy begin a relationship. Archie decides to accept that his feelings for Amelia will remain unrequited, and begins to distance himself from her.

The class graduates. Amelia begins to reflect on her relationship with Archie and realises where her true feelings lie. On the night of Heathbrook's June Ball, rather than being escorted by Billy, she sneaks out through her bedroom window and instead bikes to Archie's home to confess her feelings. Ecstatic, he accepts her invitation to go to the ball with her. As he is getting dressed, Amelia sends a text to the Love Doctor that sounds off a notification on his phone. Putting two and two together, Amelia confronts Archie and how his actions damaged both her relationship with Billy and her reputation among their classmates. She leaves for the ball on her own.

Amelia and Billy reconcile, agreeing to break up but remain friends. Meanwhile, Archie desperately takes off after Amelia, but upon arriving at the school is intercepted by the swim team who beat him up and string him upside down from a flagpole. He is saved by Billy, who kindly encourages him to go after Amelia.

Running onstage, Archie interrupts the ball to steal the microphone and give an impromptu speech. He makes peace with Billy, gains the approval of his classmates, and apologises to Amelia. As Archie declares his love for her, they share a kiss and begin to slow-dance.

== Cast ==
- Sebastian Croft as Archibald "Archie" Richard Randolph Reginald Arnold, a wealthy but incredibly unpopular schoolboy in love with his best friend Amelia
  - Henry Reinhart as 5-year-old Archie
  - Casper Knopf as 9-year-old Archie
- Charithra Chandran as Amelia "Milly" Elizabeth Brown, Archie's best friend who is blissfully unaware of his feelings and instead in love with Billy
  - Bella Induruwana as 5-year-old Amelia
  - Shaneli Gedara as 9-year-old Amelia
- Tanner Buchanan as Billy Walsh, Heathbrook's newest student from Hollywood, California, who has moved to England due to his father's business
- Daisy Jelley as Amber McKenna, a popular high school student who detests Archie and Amelia. She believes herself to be dating Billy
- Charles Camrose as Tony, a member of the swim team who frequently bullies Archie and Amelia
- Nael Ameen as Yousif, a prominent classmate
- Lucy Punch as Lilly Arnold, Archie's mother
- Tim Downie as George Arnold, Archie's father
- Dhanushka Anson as Jules Brown, Amelia's deceased mother
- Kunal Nayyar as Rupert Brown, Amelia's father
- Luyunda Unati Lewis-Nyawo as Maggie, Rupert's book-keeper for whom he develops feelings
- Nick Frost as William, an employee at the Arnold household
- Guz Khan as Mr. Atkins, the principal at Heathbrook Academy
- Maisie Peters as herself. She performs at Heathbrook's June Ball

== Reception ==
On the review aggregator website Rotten Tomatoes, 20% of 10 critics' reviews are positive.
