= Chase Stokes =

American actor (born 1992)

- Born: James Alexander Chase Stokes; September 16, 1992 (age 34); Annapolis, Maryland, U.S.
- Occupation: Actor
- Years active: 2015–present

James Alexander Chase Stokes (born September 16, 1992) is an American actor and director known for his role as John B. in the Netflix series Outer Banks (2020–2026).

== Early life ==
Stokes was born in Annapolis, Maryland, to Jeff Stokes and Jennifer Canning. His parents divorced when he was four years old. He moved with his mother to Canton, Georgia, before relocating to Orlando, Florida, as a teenager, where he attended Timber Creek High School.

Stokes earned a bachelor's degree from Valencia College and later attended the University of Central Florida and Seminole State College. When young, he aspired to become a professional ice hockey player.

== Career ==
=== Acting ===
Stokes began his acting career with small roles in television series such as Stranger Things, Daytime Divas, and Tell Me Your Secrets. In February 2019, he initially declined an offer to audition for Outer Banks before later reading for the roles of Topper and John B. The first season premiered on April 15, 2020. A second season was announced in July 2020 and released in July 2021. The third and fourth seasons premiered in February 2023 and November 2024, respectively, with a fifth and final season scheduled for 2026.

In 2019, Chase Stokes was cast as TJ in the pilot for One of Us Is Lying. However, he did not return for the full series due to a scheduling conflict with the second season of Outer Banks and was subsequently replaced.

In September 2020, he appeared alongside Madelyn Cline in the music video for Kygo and Donna Summer's single "Hot Stuff".

In October 2021, Stokes was cast in Uglies, a dystopian fantasy film based on the novel by Scott Westerfeld. The film, produced by Netflix, completed production in December 2021.

In June 2022, Stokes joined the cast of Music Got Me Here, a film based on the life of music therapist Tom Sweitzer.

In August 2022, Chase Stokes was cast in the military thriller film Valiant One. Production wrapped in late October 2022.

In January 2023, he joined the cast of Marked Men: Rule + Shaw, a young-adult romance film based on Rule by Jay Crownover. Stokes plays the lead role of Rule Archer. The film wrapped production in late 2022 and had its theatrical release on January 22, 2025.

=== Directing ===
In 2025, Stokes announced his feature directorial debut with I Told the Sunset About You, a coming-of-age romantic thriller. Based on an original concept by Stokes, the film follows a restless waitress and a quiet drifter whose journey westward leads to unforeseen consequences. The project is set to be produced by Monarch Media's Steve Barnett, Alan Powell, and Vicky Patel, continuing Stokes’ collaboration with the company after co-producing and starring in the military thriller Valiant One.

== Personal life ==
In June 2020, Stokes confirmed his relationship with Outer Banks co-star Madelyn Cline. The couple separated in October 2021.

In January 2023, he began a relationship with country singer Kelsea Ballerini. The couple broke up in February 2026 after an on-and-off relationship.

He has suffered from kidney failure, liver failure, and short-term memory loss from three concussions suffered after the conclusion of filming the final season of Outer Banks.

== Filmography ==
=== Film ===
Year	Title	Role	Notes
2018	Between Waves	Young Dale	
2021	Dr. Bird's Advice for Sad Poets	Martin	
2024	Uglies	Peris	
2025	Marked Men: Rule + Shaw	Rule Archer	
2025	Valiant One	Edward Brockman	

=== Television ===
Year	Title	Role	Notes
2015	Base	Ethan Terri	Episode #1.1
2016	Stranger Things	Reed	Episode: "Chapter Six: The Monster"
2017	Daytime Divas	Graham	3 episodes
2018	The Beach House	Russell Bennett	TV film
2018	The First	Finn	Episode: "Cycles"
2020−2026	Outer Banks	John B Routledge	Main role
2021	Tell Me Your Secrets	Adam	4 episodes

=== Music video ===
Year	Title	Artist	Role
2020	"Hot Stuff"	Kygo featuring Donna Summer	Himself
2024	"First Rodeo"	Kelsea Ballerini	Himself
