= La Settimana Incom =

Italian newsreel (1946–1965)

"La Settimana Incom" title screen

La Settimana Incom ("The Weekly Incom") was an Italian newsreel, distributed weekly in cinemas from 1946 to 1965.

== History and profile ==
The newsreel was founded after the war by Sandro Pallavicini, founder and president of the film production company INCOM. Funded by the state, and strongly backed by Christian Democrat Senator Teresio Guglielmone, with its 2555 episodes it represented for nearly two decades one of the most important and popular sources of information for the Italian audience. In the first ten years, the only editor of the newsreel was Giacomo Debenedetti.

The episodes, each lasting about 10 minutes, were projected in cinemas before the beginning of the films. The reports were largely focused on the needs of the reconstruction of a country steeped from wartime destruction, in addition to the prospect of redemption and progress.

In 1967 the Istituto Luce acquired the complete archive of the newsreel.
