= List of Italian films of 2014 =

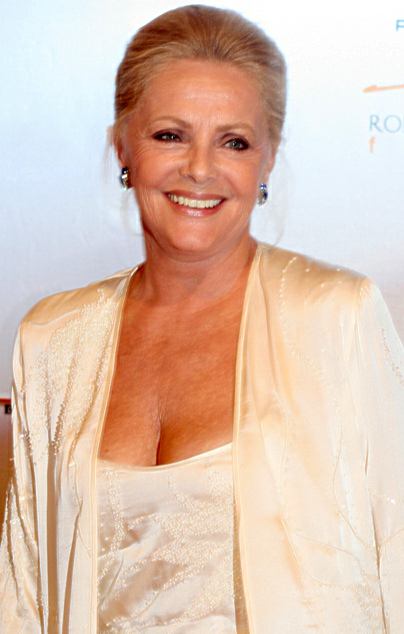
2014 saw the death of Virna Lisi.

The Italian film industry produced over two hundred feature films in 2014. This article fully lists all non-pornographic films, including short films, that had a release date in that year and which were at least partly made by Italy. It does not include films first released in previous years that had release dates in 2014.
Also included is an overview of the major events in Italian film, including film festivals and awards ceremonies, as well as lists of those films that have been particularly well received, both critically and financially.

== Major releases ==
Opening		Title	Cast and Crew	Studio	Genre(s)	Ref.
J A N U A R Y	1	A Boss in the Living Room	Director: Luca Miniero; Cast: Paola Cortellesi, Rocco Papaleo, Luca Argentero	Cattleya Film - Warner Bros.	Comedy	
J A N U A R Y	16	Anita B.	Director: Roberto Faenza; Cast: Eline Powell, Robert Sheehan, Andrea Osvárt		Drama	
J A N U A R Y	19	Sapore di te	Director: Carlo Vanzina; Cast: Vincenzo Salemme, Maurizio Mattioli, Nancy Brilli, Serena Autieri		Comedy	
J A N U A R Y	23	Tutta colpa di Freud	Director: Paolo Genovese; Cast: Marco Giallini, Anna Foglietta, Maurizio Mattioli, Edoardo Leo	Mudusa Film	Comedy	
J A N U A R Y	30	People Who Are Well	Director: Francesco Patierno; Cast: Claudio Bisio, Margherita Buy, Diego Abatantuono	01 Distribution	Comedy; Drama	
F E B R U A R Y	6	I Can Quit Whenever I Want	Director: Sydney Sibilia; Cast: Edoardo Leo, Neri Marcorè, Paolo Calabresi		Comedy	
F E B R U A R Y	8	Quiet Bliss	Director: Edoardo Winspeare; Cast: Celeste Casciaro, Laura Licchetta, Anna Boccadamo		Drama	
F E B R U A R Y	14	The Mystery of Dante	Director: Louis Nero; Cast: F. Murray Abraham, Taylor Hackford, Franco Zeffirelli, Christopher Vogler, Valerio Manfredi	L'Altrofilm	Biography; Historical; Mystery	
F E B R U A R Y	27	A Woman as a Friend	Director: Giovanni Veronesi; Cast: Fabio De Luigi, Laetitia Casta, Valentina Lodovini, Valeria Solarino, Adriano Giannini		Romance; Comedy	
M A R C H	6	Fasten Your Seatbelts	Director: Ferzan Özpetek; Cast: Kasia Smutniak, Francesco Arca, Carolina Crescentini		Comedy; Drama	
M A R C H	7	Closer to the Moon	Director: Nae Caranfil; Cast: Vera Farmiga, Mark Strong, Harry Lloyd	Mandragora Movies	Comedy; Drama	
M A R C H	8	Registe	Director: Diana Dell'Erba; Cast: Maria De Medeiros, Elvira Notari, Lina Wertmüller	L'Altrofilm	Documentary	
M A R C H	14	The Silent Mountain	Director: Ernst Gossner; Cast: William Moseley, Eugenia Costantini, Claudia Cardinale, Fritz Karl, Werner Daehn		War; Drama	
M A R C H	20	Amici come noi	Director: Enrico Lando; Cast: Pio e Amedeo, Alessandra Mastronardi	Medusa Film	Comedy	
A P R I L	3	Do You Remember Me?	Director: Rolando Ravello; Cast: Ambra Angiolini, Edoardo Leo		Comedy	
A P R I L	4	Italo	Director: Alessia Scarso; Cast: Marco Bocci, Elena Radonicich, Barbara Tabita		Comedy	
M A Y	8	Sexy Shop	Director: Maria Erica Pacileo and Fernando Maraghini; Cast: Andrea Chimenti, Ivan Cattaneo, Elisabetta Viviani, Gazebo, Johnson Righeira, Tre Allegri Ragazzi Morti, Maurizio Arcieri	Vincenzo Marega	Comedy; Drama	
M A Y	14	Grace of Monaco	Director: Olivier Dahan; Cast: Nicole Kidman, Tim Roth, Frank Langella, Parker Posey, Milo Ventimiglia, Derek Jacobi, Paz Vega	The Weinstein Company	Biography; Drama	
M A Y	15	Darker Than Midnight	Director: Sebastiano Riso; Cast: Vincenzo Amato, Micaela Ramazzotti	Cinecittà Luc	Drama	
M A Y	18	The Wonders	Director: Alice Rohrwacher; Cast: Alba Rohrwacher, André Hennicke, Monica Bellucci		Drama	
M A Y	20	Two Days, One Night	Directors: Luc Dardenne, Jean-Pierre Dardenne; Cast: Marion Cotillard, Fabrizio Rongione	Canal+	Drama	
M A Y	22	Bridges of Sarajevo	Directors: Aida Begić, Leonardo Di Constanzo, Jean-Luc Godard, Kamen Kalev, Isild Le Besco, Sergei Loznitsa, Vincenzo Marra, Ursula Meier, Vladimir Perišić, Cristi Puiu, Marc Recha, Angela Schanelec, Teresa Villaverde		Documentary	
22	Misunderstood	Director: Asia Argento; Cast: Charlotte Gainsbourg, Gabriel Garko, Gianmarco Tognazzi		Drama		
J U N E	4	Another South	Director: Gianluca Maria Tavarelli; Cast: Isabella Ragonese, Francesco Scianna		Romance; Drama	
J U N E	5	House of Shadows	Director: Rossella de Venuto; Cast: Fiona Glascott, Pietro Ragusa, Federico Casrtelluccio, Bianca Nappi, Marcello Prayer, Ray Lovelock	Interlinea Films	Thriller	
J U N E	25	L'Ex de ma vie	Director: Dorothée Sebbagh; Cast: Géraldine Nakache, Kim Rossi Stuart, Pascal Demolon, Catherine Jacob	UGC	Comedy	
J U N E	27	Walking on Sunshine	Director: Max Giwa; Cast: Annabel Scholey, Giulio Berruti, Leona Lewis, Katy Brand	Vertigo Films	Drama; Musical	
J U L Y	5	Bota	Directors: Iris Elezi, Thomas Logoreci; Cast: Flonja Kodheli		Drama	
J U L Y	7	The Tree	Director: Sonja Prosenc; Cast: Katarina Stegnar		Drama	
A U G U S T	29	12-12-12			Documentary	
A U G U S T	29	Black Souls	Director: Francesco Munzi; Cast: Marco Leonardi, Peppino Mazzotta, Barbora Bobuľová		Drama	
A U G U S T	31	Hungry Hearts	Director: Saverio Costanzo; Cast: Adam Driver, Alba Rohrwacher, Roberta Maxwell		Drama	
A U G U S T	31	The Cut	Director: Fatih Akın; Cast: Tahar Rahim		Drama	
S E P T E M B E R	1	Leopardi	Director: Mario Martone; Cast: Elio Germano, Michele Riondino, Massimo Popolizio	01 Distribution	Drama	
S E P T E M B E R	3	The State-Mafia Pact	Director: Sabina Guzzanti; Cast: Sabina Guzzanti, Antonino Bruschetta	BIM Distribuzione	Documentary	
S E P T E M B E R	4	Pasolini	Director: Abel Ferrara; Cast: Willem Dafoe, Maria de Medeiros, Ninetto Davoli, Riccardo Scamarcio	Canal+	Drama	
S E P T E M B E R	4	The Dinner	Director: Ivano De Matteo; Cast: Luigi Lo Cascio, Giovanna Mezzogiorno, Alessandro Gassman		Drama	
S E P T E M B E R	6	The Face of an Angel	Director: Michael Winterbottom; Cast: Kate Beckinsale, Daniel Brühl, Cara Delevingne	Soda Pictures	Thriller	
S E P T E M B E R	11	Without Pity	Director: Michele Alhaique; Cast: Pierfrancesco Favino, Greta Scarano, Claudio Gioè, Adriano Giannini, Ninetto Davoli		Crime; Thriller	
S E P T E M B E R	18	A Golden Boy	Director: Pupi Avati; Cast: Riccardo Scamarcio, Sharon Stone, Cristiana Capotondi, Giovanna Ralli	01 Distribution	Comedy; Drama	
S E P T E M B E R	18	Mafia and Red Tomatoes	Director: Giulio Manfredonia; Cast: Stefano Accorsi, Sergio Rubini, Iaia Forte, Bebo Storti, Debora Caprioglio		Comedy	
O C T O B E R	2	Perez.	Director: Edoardo De Angelis; Cast: Luca Zingaretti, Marco D'Amore		Crime; Drama; Thriller	
O C T O B E R	23	Soap Opera	Director: Alessandro Genovesi; Cast: Fabio De Luigi, Cristiana Capotondi, Diego Abatantuono, Ricky Memphis		Comedy	
O C T O B E R	23	Good for Nothing	Director: Gianni Di Gregorio; Cast: Gianni Di Gregorio, Valentina Lodovini, Marco Marzocca, Marco Messeri		Comedy	
N O V E M B E R	6	Andiamo a quel paese	Director: Ficarra e Picone; Cast: Ficarra e Picone, Tiziana Lodato, Nino Frassica		Comedy	
N O V E M B E R	6	Greenery Will Bloom Again	Director: Ermanno Olmi; Cast: Claudio Santamaria, Alessandro Sperduti		War	
N O V E M B E R	6	Unique Brothers	Director: Alessio Maria Federici; Cast: Raoul Bova, Luca Argentero, Carolina Crescentini, Miriam Leone		Comedy	
N O V E M B E R	13	Midnight Sun	Director: Roger Spottiswoode; Cast: Dakota Goyo, Goran Visnjic, Bridget Moynahan		Adventure; Family	
N O V E M B E R	13	The Ice Forest	Director: Claudio Noce; Cast: Emir Kusturica, Kseniya Rappoport, Domenico Diele, Adriano Giannini		Thriller film	
N O V E M B E R	20	Do You See Me?	Director: Riccardo Milani; Cast: Paola Cortellesi, Raoul Bova, Corrado Fortuna		Comedy	
D E C E M B E R	4	The Perfect Husband	Director: Lucas Pavetto; Cast: Bret Roberts, Gabriella Wright, Carl Wharton, Philippe Reinhardt, Tania Bambaci, Daniel Vivian		Horror	
D E C E M B E R	18	The Invisible Boy	Director: Gabriele Salvatores; Cast: Valeria Golino, Fabrizio Bentivoglio, Kseniya Rappoport	Pathé	Fantasy; Superhero	
D E C E M B E R	18	Un Natale Stupefacente	Director: Volfango De Biasi; Cast: Lillo & Greg, Ambra Angiolini		Comedy	

== Notable deaths ==
Month	Date	Name	Age	Nationality	Profession	Notable films
January	11	Arnoldo Foà	97	Italian	Actor	The Shoes of the Fisherman; The Trial
January	22	Carlo Mazzacurati	57	Italian	Director, Screenwriter	Italian Night; The Right Distance
January	23	Riz Ortolani	87	Italian	Composer, Conductor	The Yellow Rolls-Royce; Day of Anger
January	29	Aïché Nana	77	Lebanese-Italian	Actress	A Touch of the Sun; King David
February	14	Remo Capitani	86	Italian	Actor	The Grand Duel; Ace High
June	8	Veronica Lazăr	75	Romanian-Italian	Actress	The Sheltering Sky; La Luna
October	5	Anna Maria Gherardi	74	Italian	Actress	1900; The Grand Duel
October	7	Federico Boido	75	Italian	Actor	Super Fly T.N.T.; The Canterbury Tales
December	5	Manuel De Sica	65	Italian	Composer	A Place for Lovers; Sunday Lovers
December	18	Virna Lisi	78	Italian	Actress	How to Murder Your Wife; Not with My Wife, You Don't!
December	20	Gino Pellegrini	73	Italian-American	Set Designer	Mary Poppins; West Side Story

== See also ==
- 2014 in film
- 2014 in Italy
- 2014 in Italian television
- Cinema of Italy
- List of Italian submissions for the Academy Award for Best Foreign Language Film
