= Men vs. Women =

2010 Italian comedy film

- Film poster
- Italian: Maschi contro femmine
- Directed by: Fausto Brizzi
- Written by: Fausto Brizzi; Marco Martani; Massimiliano Bruno; Valeria Di Napoli
- Produced by: Federica Lucisano; Fulvio Lucisano
- Starring: Paola Cortellesi; Fabio De Luigi; Sarah Felberbaum; Chiara Francini; Lucia Ocone; Francesco Pannofino; Alessandro Preziosi; Paolo Ruffini; Carla Signoris; Nicolas Vaporidis; Giorgia Würth
- Cinematography: Marcello Montarsi
- Edited by: Luciana Pandolfelli
- Music by: Bruno Zambrini
- Distributed by: 01 Distribution
- Release date: October 27, 2010
- Running time: 108 minutes
- Country: Italy
- Language: Italian

Men vs. Women (Italian: Maschi contro femmine) is a 2010 Italian comedy film directed by Fausto Brizzi.

A sequel entitled Women vs. Men (Femmine contro maschi) was released in February 2011.

== Cast ==
- Paola Cortellesi as Chiara
- Fabio De Luigi as Walter Bertocchi
- Sarah Felberbaum as Francesca
- Chiara Francini as Marta
- Lucia Ocone as Monica
- Francesco Pannofino as Vittorio
- Alessandro Preziosi as Diego
- Paolo Ruffini as Ivan
- Carla Signoris as Nicoletta
- Nicolas Vaporidis as Andrea
- Giorgia Würth as Eva Castelli
- Claudio Bisio as Marcello
- Nancy Brilli as Paola
- Giuseppe Cederna as Renato
- Luciana Littizzetto as Anna
- Emilio Solfrizzi as Piero
- Luca Calvani as Marco
- Daniel McVicar as Captain Bell
- Isabelle Adriani as Svetlana
- Laura Barriales as Ramona Gomez
- Metis Di Meo as Tatiana
- Marta Zoffoli as Lisa
- Maurizia Cacciatori as herself
- Francesca Piccinini as herself
- Cristina Barcellini as herself
- Letizia Camera as herself
