= Civita di Bagnoregio =

Town in the province of Viterbo, Italy

Civita
- Village
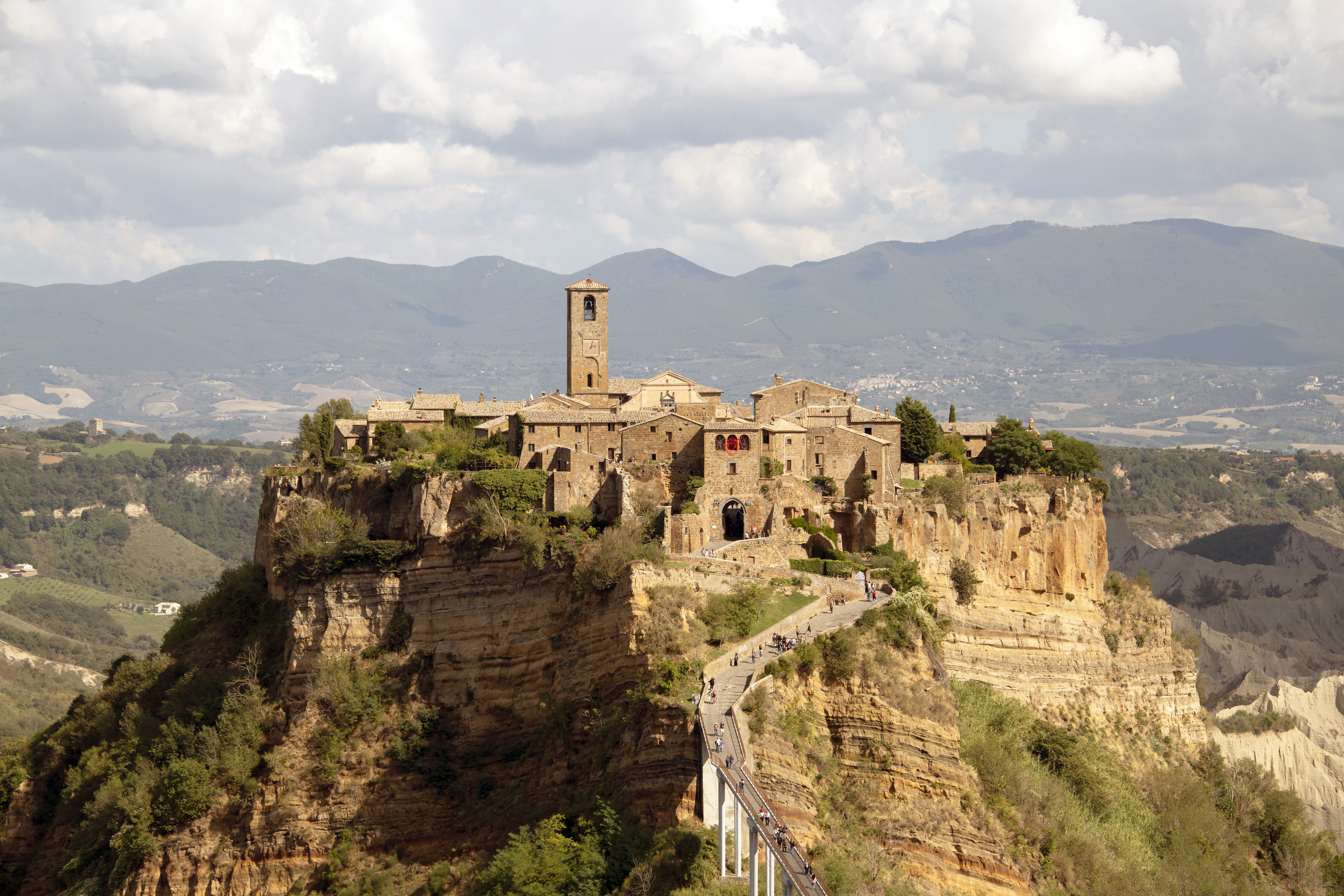
- Civita di Bagnoregio
- Interactive map of Civita
- Coordinates: 42°37′40″N 12°06′50″E
- Country: Italy
- Region: Lazio
- Province: Viterbo
- Comune: Bagnoregio
- Elevation: 443 m (1,453 ft)

Population
  - Total: 11
- Time zone: UTC+1 (CET)
- Postal code: 01022
- Area code: 0761

Civita di Bagnoregio (Italian pronunciation: [ˈtʃiːvita di ˌbaɲɲoˈrɛːdʒo]) is an outlying village of the comune (municipality) of Bagnoregio in the Province of Viterbo in central Italy. It lies 1 kilometre (0.6 mi) east of the town of Bagnoregio and about 120 kilometres (75 mi) north of Rome.

The only access is a footbridge from the nearby town, with a toll introduced in 2013. Because of the toll, communal taxes were abolished in Civita and nearby Bagnoregio. Due to its unstable foundation that often erodes, Civita is famously known as "the city that dies". It is one of I Borghi più belli d'Italia ("The most beautiful villages of Italy").

== Territory ==
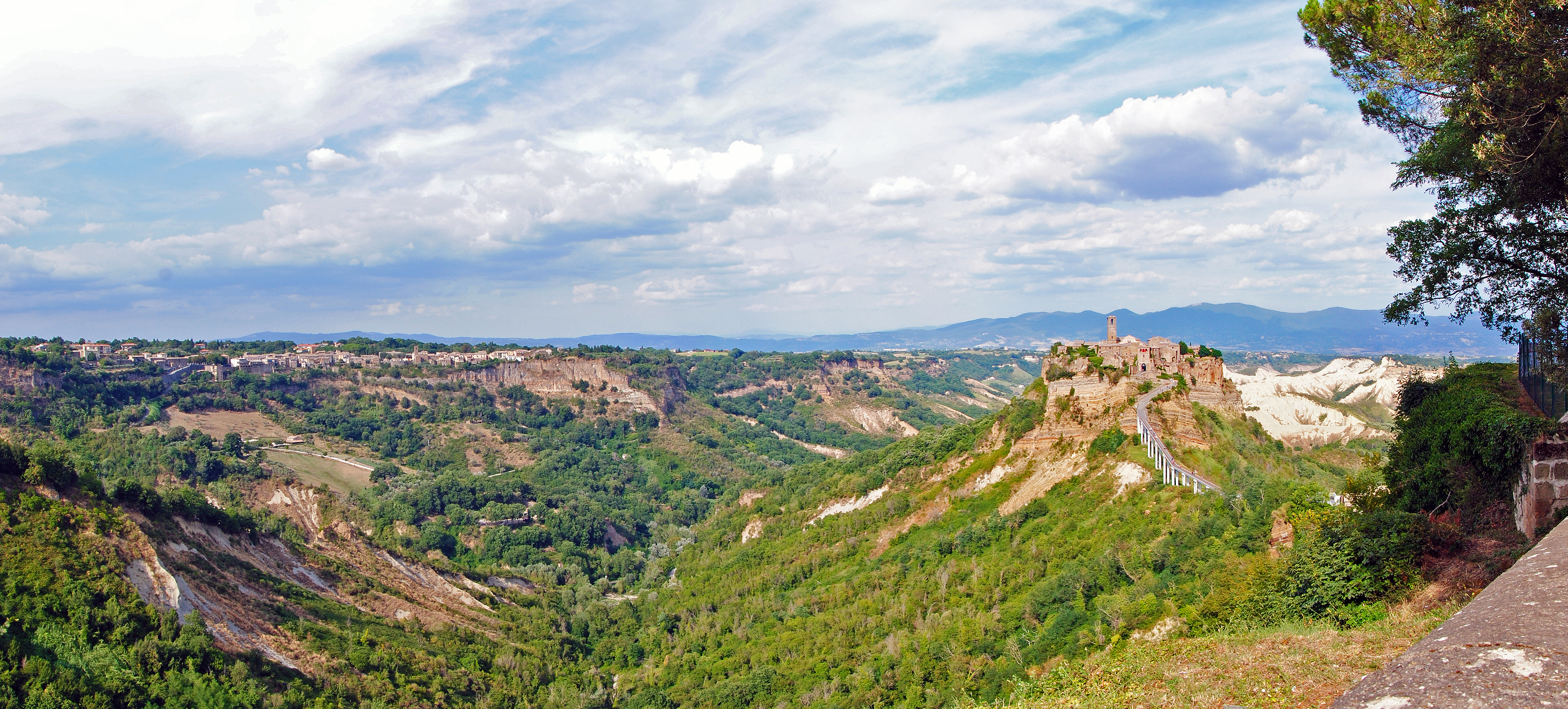
Panorama of Civita di Bagnoregio with a view of "Valle dei Calanchi"

Civita is situated in the valley of the badlands (Valle dei Calanchi), a region east of Lake Bolsena and west of the Tiber Valley, in the municipality of Bagnoregio. It consists of two main valleys: the Fossato del Rio Torbido and the Fossato del Rio Chiaro. Originally these places might have been easier to reach and were crossed by an ancient road that linked the Tiber Valley to Lake Bolsena.

The morphology of this region was caused by erosion and landslides. The territory is made up of two different formations of rocks, different in chronology and constitution. The most ancient formation is that of clay; it comes from the sea and forms the base layer which is particularly subject to erosion. The top layers are made up of tuff and lava material. The fast erosion is due to the streams, to atmospheric agents but also to deforestation.

Civita, which is inhabited by only 16 people, is situated in a solitary area and it is reachable only by a reinforced concrete pedestrian bridge built in 1965. The bridge is generally restricted to pedestrians, but to meet the requirements of residents and workers the Municipality of Bagnoregio issued a statement that these people may cross the bridge by bike or by motorcycle at certain times. The reason for its isolation is the progressive erosion of the hill and the nearby valley which creates the badlands; this process is still ongoing, and there is the danger that the village could disappear. This is why Civita is also known as "The Dying Town".

== History ==
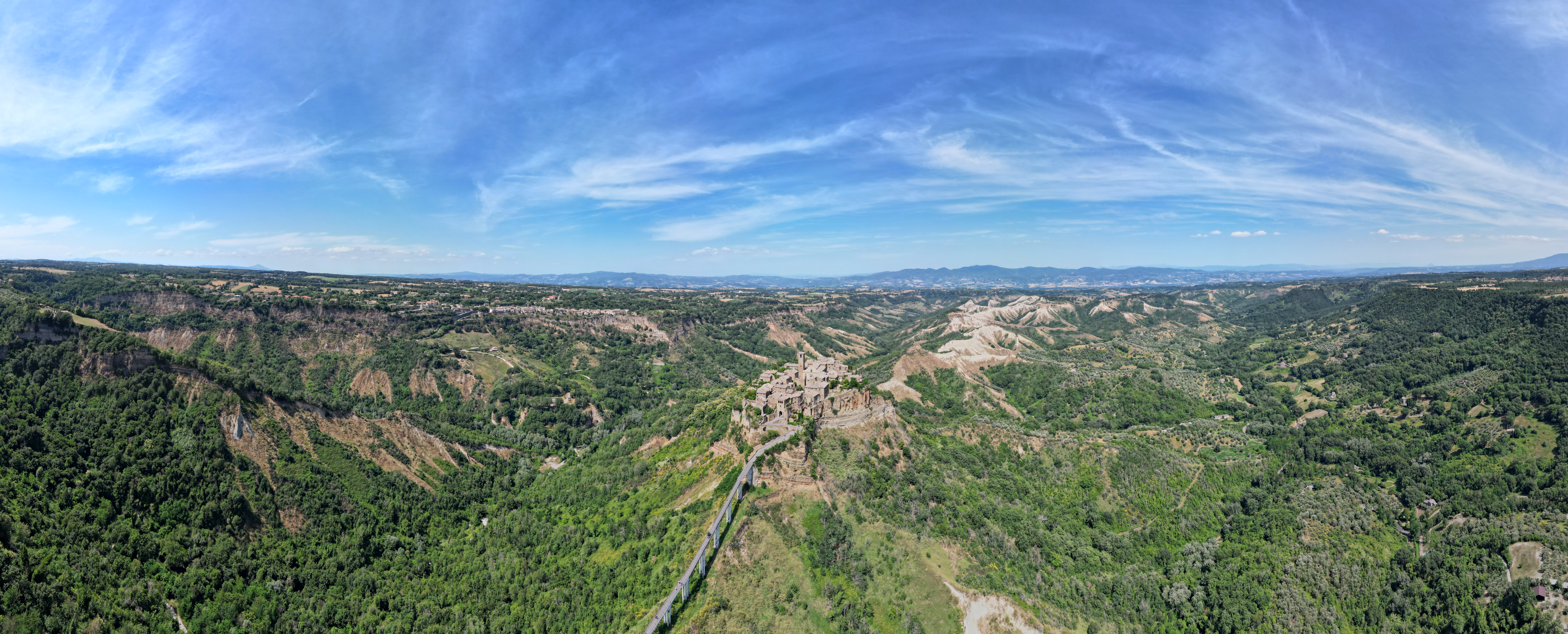
Civita di Bagnoregio aerial panorama - June 2024.

Civita di Bagnoregio was founded by the Etruscans more than 2,500 years ago. Formerly there were five city gates to access the ancient town of Civita, nowadays instead, Porta Santa Maria (known as Porta Cava, as well) is the main gateway of the city. It is also possible to enter the town of Civita from the badlands valley through a tunnel carved into the rock.

The layout of the whole town is of Etruscan origin, based on a cardo and decumanus orthogonal street system according to the Etruscan and Roman use, while the entire architectural cladding is of medieval and Renaissance origin.

There are numerous traces of Etruscan civilisation in Civita, especially in the San Francesco Vecchio area: a little Etruscan necropolis was found in the cliff located in the area below Belvedere di San Francesco Vecchio. The cave of St Bonaventure (where it is said that Saint Francis healed the little Giovanni Fidanza, who later became Saint Bonaventure) is also an Etruscan chamber tomb.

The Etruscans made Civita (whose original name is unknown) a flourishing city, thanks to its strategic position favourable for trade and thanks to its proximity to the most important communication routes of the times.

Many traces of the Etruscan period are still suggestive spots: the so-called Bucaione, for example, is a deep tunnel that goes through the lowest part of the city and gives access to badlands valley directly from the town.

In the past, many chamber tombs were visible. They were dug at the base of Civita's cliff and nearby tuff walls and, over the centuries, they were destroyed by several rockfalls. Indeed, the Etruscans themselves had to face problems of seismic activity and instability, like the earthquake of 280 BC.

When the Romans arrived in 265 BC, they took up and carried on the rainwater drainage and the stream containment works that were first started by the Etruscans.

Civita (or City) was the birthplace of Saint Bonaventure, who died in 1274. The location of his boyhood house has long since fallen off the edge of the cliff. By the 16th century, Civita di Bagnoregio was beginning to decline, becoming eclipsed by its former suburb Bagnoregio.

At the end of the 17th century, a major earthquake accelerated the decline of the old town, forcing both the bishop and the municipal government to relocate to Bagnoregio. At the time, the area was part of the Papal States.

In the 19th century, Civita di Bagnoregio's isolation increased significantly as erosion intensified—particularly in the area where the modern pedestrian bridge now stands—due to the exposure of a layer of clay beneath the tuff.

While Bagnoregio continued as a small but prosperous town, the original settlement became known in Italian as La città che muore ("The Dying Town"). Civita di Bagnoregio has only recently undergone a revival, largely due to growing interest from tourists.

CNN in January 2020 associated the "over-tourism" with the mayor deciding to charge a minor fee for entry, which increased publicity and subsequently attendance. CNN also noted that the town had more feline inhabitants than its 12-human residents.

The only access is a footbridge from the nearby town, with a €1.50 toll introduced in 2013 and increased in August 2017 to €3 on weekdays and €5 on Sundays and public holidays. Civita had 40,000 visitors in 2010 and was estimated to attract 850,000 visitors in 2017. Due to the toll, communal taxes were abolished in Civita and nearby Bagnoregio, making Bagnoregio the only town in Italy without communal taxes.

== Location ==
The town is noted for its dramatic position atop a plateau of friable volcanic tuff, overlooking the Tiber river valley. It faces constant risk of destruction, as the edges of the plateau continue to erode, causing buildings to collapse as their foundations give way. As of 2004, there were plans to reinforce the plateau with steel rods in order to prevent further geological damage.

=== Architecture ===
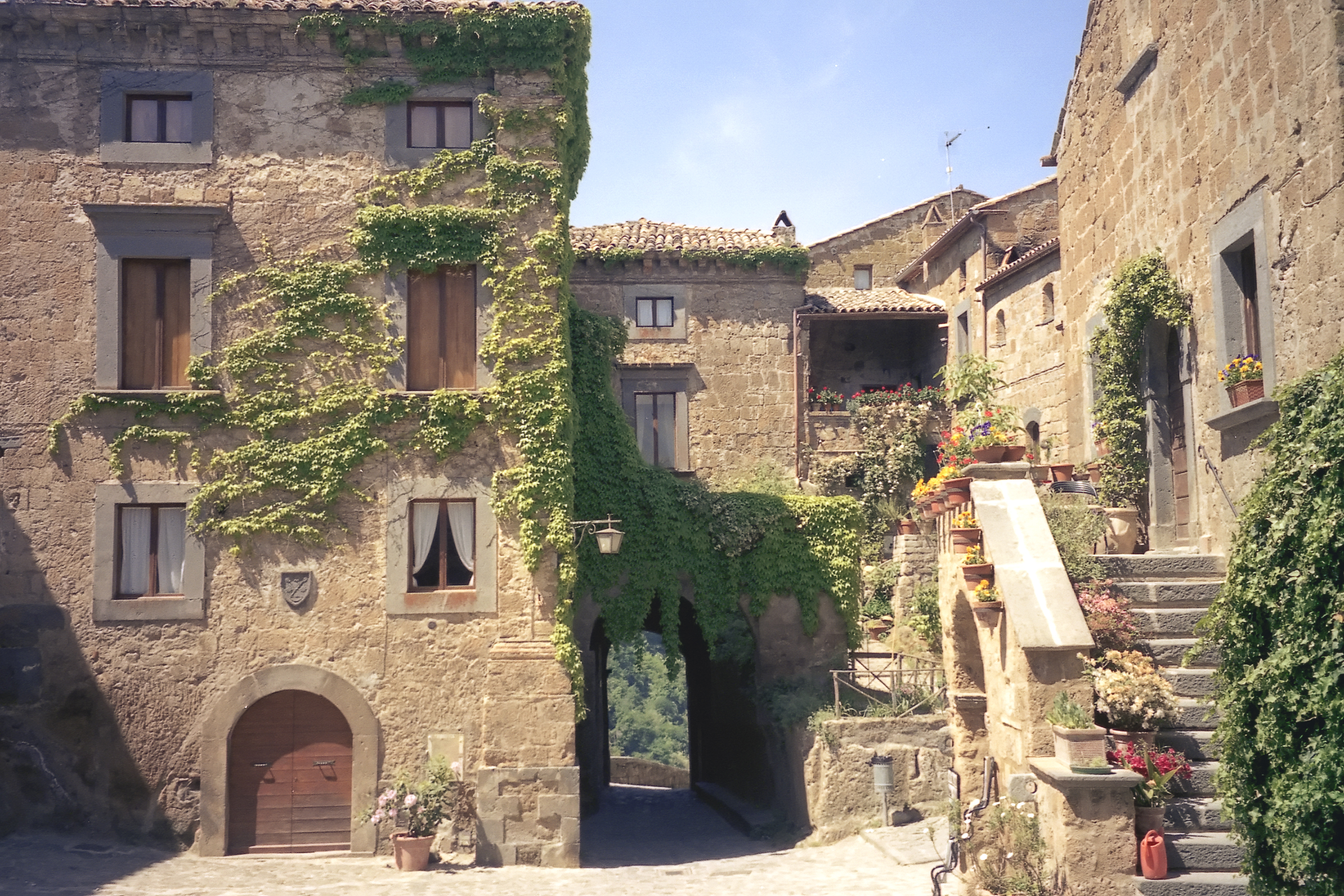
View of Civita di Bagnoregio

Civita di Bagnoregio is widely admired for its architecture, which spans several centuries. Much of its remarkably preserved state is due to its relative isolation; the town escaped most of the intrusions of modernity as well as the destruction brought by the two World Wars.

As of 2021, the permanent population of Civita was estimated at 11 residents. However, the town becomes more lively during the summer months due to the presence of bed-and-breakfast accommodations catering to tourists.

In 2006, Civita was placed on the World Monuments Fund's Watch List of the 100 Most Endangered Sites, due to ongoing threats from erosion and unregulated tourism.

== Monuments and places of interest ==
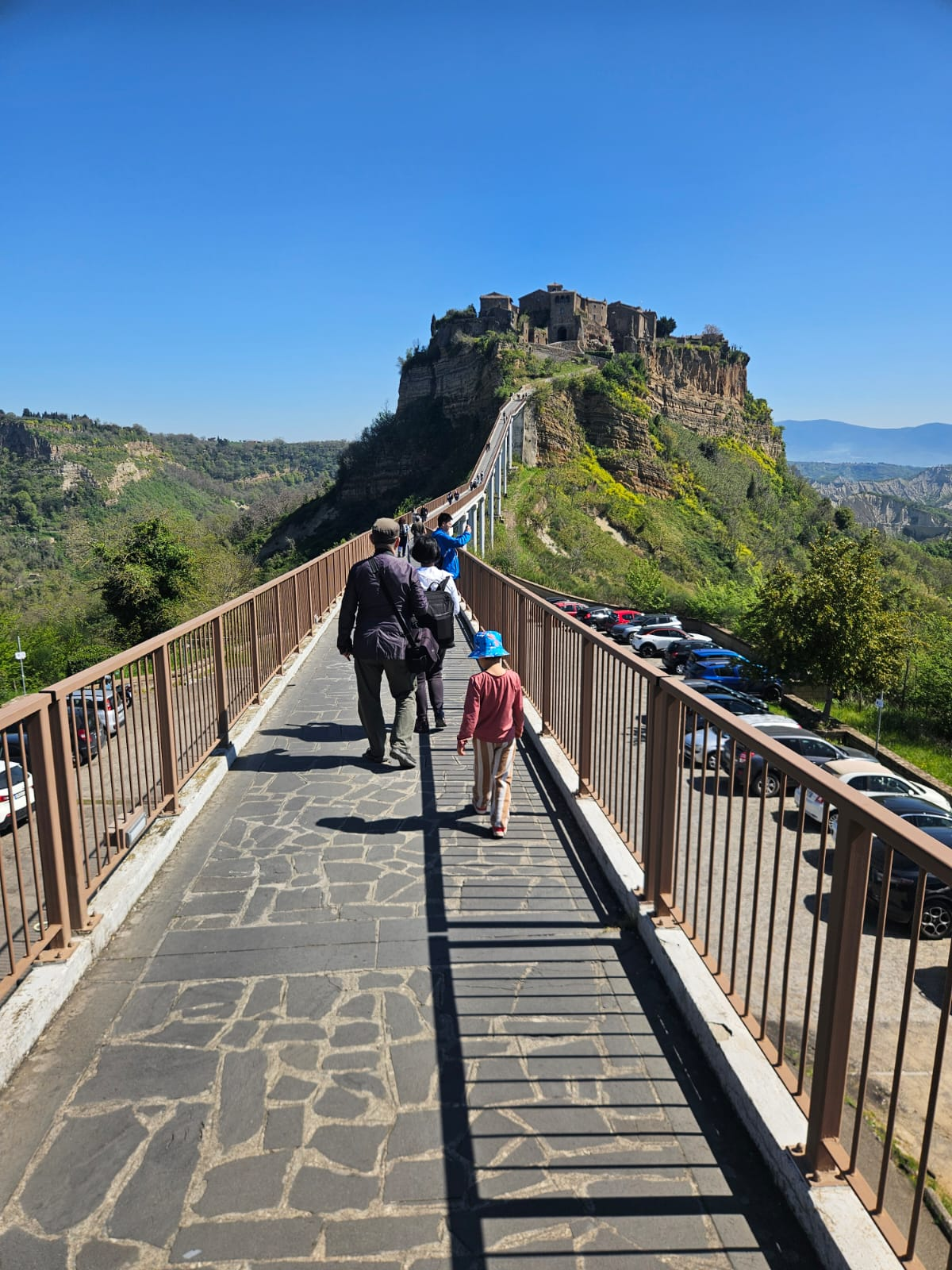
Tourists on their way to Civita di Bagnoregio

Inside the village there are several medieval houses; the church of San Donato, which overlooks the main square and inside which the holy wooden crucifix is kept; Alemanni Palace, home of the Geological and Landslides Museum; the Bishop's Palace, a mill of the 16th century; the remains of the house where St. Bonaventure was born and the door of Santa Maria, with two lions holding a human head between their paws, in memory of a popular revolt of the inhabitants of Civita against the Orvieto family of Monaldeschi.

In 2005 there was a proposal for the gullies of Civita to become a site of community interest.

== Economy and tourism ==
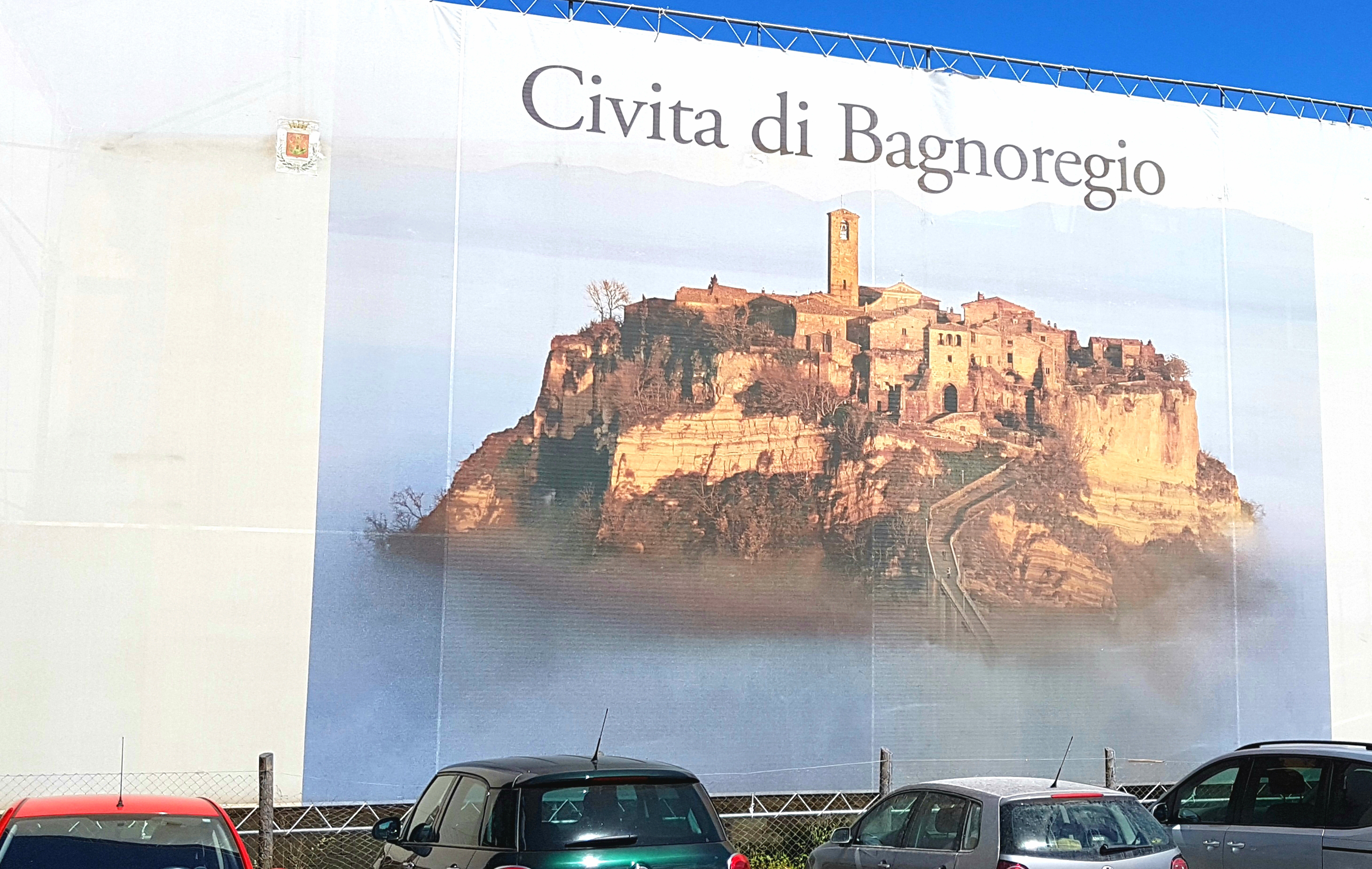
Billboard at the tourist parking lot, Civita di Bagnoregio

Thanks to its evocative geographical position and well-preserved medieval architecture, the town attracts many tourists and has frequently served as a location for film productions.

It is officially included in the list of I Borghi più belli d'Italia ("The Most Beautiful Villages of Italy") and is noted for its preserved historic fabric and panoramic setting.

In January 2021, the mayor of Bagnoregio submitted a proposal to UNESCO to designate Civita as a World Heritage Site, citing its cultural significance, architectural integrity, and ongoing conservation efforts.

== Culture ==
=== The Holy Crucifix of Civita ===
On Good Friday, the Holy Crucifix is laid on a coffin in the church of San Donato to be transported in the centuries-old "Processione del Venerdì Santo di Bagnoregio" ("Good Friday Procession of Bagnoregio"). The legend narrates that during a plague epidemic, which in 1449 hit the whole territory around Bagnoregio, the cross talked to a pious woman, who went every day before the venerated image asking with her prayers for the end of that agony. One day, while the woman was praying to Christ, she heard a voice that reassured her, saying that the Lord had fulfilled her prayers and that the pestilence would end. And indeed, after a few days, the plague was over, at the same time as the death of the pious woman.

Events

- At Christmas time a nativity scene takes place; the stories of Mary and Joseph are set in the medieval streets.
- The first Sunday of June and the second of September, in the main square, the secular Palio della Tonna ("tonda" in the local dialect) is prepared. In this palio (horse race) the districts of Civita challenge each other on donkey back, supported by cheering inhabitants.
- The first Sunday of June, there is the first feast day, called Maria SS. Liberatrice.
- The last week of July and the first of August the Tuscia in Jazz Festival takes place with concerts, seminars, and jam sessions.
- The second Sunday of September the second feast day takes place, called SS. Crocifisso.

Cinema and television

- Among the many movies shot in Civita: The Two Colonels (1962), directed by Stefano Vanzina; the episode Il prete of the movie Let's Have a Riot (1970); the episode of the movie Nostalghia (1983) directed by Andrei Tarkovsky; the miniseries Pinocchio directed by Alberto Sironi transmitted on RAI 1 in 2009; It's All About Karma (2017), directed by Edoardo Falcone; My Big Gay Italian Wedding (2018) directed by Alessandro Genovesi.
- In Civita the initial footage of Esperança was shot, transmitted in Italy in 2002.
- Civita was Hayao Miyazaki's inspiration for Studio Ghibli's animated 1986 movie Castle in the Sky.
- The opening scene of the Netflix series Can This Love Be Translated? which follows the romance between interpreter Joo Ho-jin and actress Cha Mu-hee, was filmed in Civita di Bagnoregio.
