= When Mom Is Away... With the In-laws =

2025 comedy film

- Theatrical release poster
- Directed by: Alessandro Genovesi
- Screenplay by: Alessandro Genovesi; Giovanni Bognetti
- Produced by: Simone Tacchia; Iginio Straffi; Alessandro Usai
- Starring: Fabio De Luigi; Valentina Lodovini
- Cinematography: Luca Esposito
- Edited by: Claudio Di Mauro
- Music by: Andrea Farri
- Distributed by: Medusa Film
- Release date: 23 January 2025
- Running time: 98 minutes
- Country: Italy
- Language: Italian

When Mom Is Away... With the In-laws (Italian: 10 giorni con i suoi, lit. '10 days with his family', also spelled Dieci giorni con i suoi) is a 2025 Italian comedy film co-written and directed by Alessandro Genovesi, starring Fabio De Luigi and Valentina Lodovini. It is the sequel of When Mom Is Away... With the Family and the third chapter in the film series started with When Mom Is Away.

== Cast ==
- Fabio De Luigi as Carlo
- Valentina Lodovini as Giulia
- Angelica Elli as Camilla
- Bianca Usai as Bianca
- Matteo Castellucci as Tito
- Dino Abbrescia as Lucio
- Giulia Bevilacqua as Mara
- Marcello Cesena as the priest

== Production ==
The film was produced by Colorado Film in association with Medusa Film and in collaboration with Amazon Prime Video. It was shot in 6 weeks between Rome and various locations in Apulia, including Lecce, Melpignano, Gallipoli and Galatone.

== Release ==
The film was released in Italian cinemas by Medusa Film on 23 January 2025.

== Reception ==
The film ranked first on the Italian box office for three consecutive weeks. The Corriere della Sera's film critic Paolo Baldini described the film as "farcical", "light-hearted" and "edulcorated".
