= Chiara Francini =

Italian actress

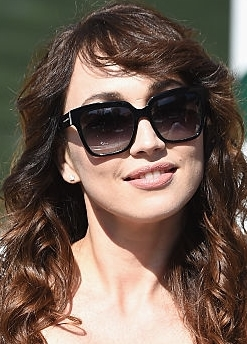
- Francini in 2017
- Born: 20 December 1979 (age 45); Florence, Italy
- Occupations: Actress; comedian; author
- Years active: 2001–present

Chiara Francini (Italian pronunciation: [ˈkjaːra franˈtʃiːni]; born 20 December 1979) is an Italian actress, comedian and author.

== Early and personal life ==
Born in Florence and raised in Campi Bisenzio, Francini graduated from the University of Florence with a degree in Literature, with a thesis in Italian Studies on the rhetoric of hermeneutics, receiving the highest mark of 110 with honors (cum laude).

Since 2005, she has been in a relationship with Swedish security services entrepreneur Frederick Lundqvist (born 1976), with the couple spending time between her native Tuscany and Luleå, Sweden.

== Career ==
After her graduation, Francini underwent a three-year theatre course in Florence, at the Teatro della Limonaia, directed by Barbara Nativi, under whose direction she played a role in Peanuts, written by Fausto Paravidino. For two consecutive years she acted in Faccia da comico under the artistic direction of Serena Dandini at the Ambra Jovinelli theatre in Rome. She got into television through Marco Giusti, who offered her a role in Blablabla and Stracult.

She then had a part in Ragazze di San Frediano, directed by Vittorio Sindoni and in 2007 she was Marcia Meniconi, one of the protagonists of Gente di mare 2. In 2008, she played a major role in the sitcom Radio Sex, directed by Alessandro Baracco.

Between 2007 and 2008 she took part in four movies: Leonardo Pieraccioni wanted her for the role of Giustina in A Beautiful Wife, Francesco Patierno chose her for Il mattino ha l'oro in bocca, Spike Lee, after casting her personally, had her play Fabiola, one of the victims of the Nazi massacre of Sant'Anna di Stazzema, in Miracle at St. Anna and finally in 2008 Stefano Tummolini offered her the role of Stella in Un altro pianeta (Eng.: One Day in a Life), a film shown at the 2008 Venice Film Festival, where it was awarded the Queer Lion, and at the Sundance Film Festival in 2009.

In 2009, she acted in the television miniseries Le segretarie del sesto piano, directed by Angelo Longoni, and in the movie Feisbum!, directed by Emanuele Sana.

In 2010, she appeared in the television series Tutti pazzi per amore 2, directed by Riccardo Milani, in which she played the character of Bea, and in the film noir La donna velata, directed by Edoardo Margheriti.

In 2010 and 2011, she played Martha in Maschi contro femmine (Males vs Females) and Femmine contro maschi (Females vs Males), both directed by Fausto Brizzi.

In 2011, she acted in C'è chi dice no (Eng. title: Some Say No), directed by Giambattista Avellino, Cacao, directed by Luca Rea, and Amici miei come tutto ebbe inizio, directed by Neri Parenti.

In 2011, Francini was awarded the Biraghi Prize as "Shooting Star of the year" at the 68th Venice Film Festival, given by the Italian National Syndicate of Film Journalists.

In 2011, she was part of the main cast in the television programme Colorado broadcast by Italia 2. That same year she also acted in La peggior settimana della mia vita (English title: The Worst Week of My Life), directed by Alessandro Genovesi and in Un natale per due, a SKY Cinema production, which had the highest share ever recorded on the Italian SKY network, directed by Giambattista Avellino where apart from having a major role she also performed Carmen by Bizet.

Finally that year, she returned to Rai 1 to once again embody the character of Bea in Tutti pazzi per amore 3, directed by Laura Muscardin.

In 2012, she acted in the television mini-series Nero Wolfe directed by Riccardo Donna and broadcast by Rai 1.

In 2011, she was chosen as a spokesperson for Dolce&Gabbana in their men's SS2012 world campaign.

== Filmography ==
Films
Year	Title	Role	Notes
2005	Tutti all'attacco	TV Host	Cameo appearance
2007	A Beautiful Wife	Giustina	
2008	The Early Bird Catches the Worm	Loredana	
2008	Miracle at St. Anna	Fabiola	
2008	One Day in a Life	Stella	
2010	Men vs. Women	Marta	
2011	Some Say No	Mara De Fornaris	
2011	Amici miei – Come tutto ebbe inizio	Tessa	
2011	Women vs. Men	Marta	
2011	The Worst Week of My Life	Simona	
2012	Buona giornata	Chiara	
2013	Women Drive Me Crazy	Beatrice Morelli	
2014	Ti sposo ma non troppo	Carlotta	
2014	Soap Opera	Alice	
2014	Tutto molto bello	Anna	
2016	On Air: Storia di un successo	Mercedes Conti	
2016	The Angry Birds Movie	Matilda (voice)	Italian dub
2019	Martin Eden	Nora	
2021	Addio al nubilato	Vanessa	
2022	Tre sorelle	Caterina	
2024	Pare parecchio Parigi	Giovanna	

Television
Year	Title	Role	Notes
2007	Le ragazze di San Frediano	Chiara	Miniseries
2007	Gente di mare	Marzia Meniconi	Main role (season 2); 25 episodes
2008	Camera Café	Herself	Episode: "La vigilessa"
2008	Don Matteo	Barbara Radici	Episode: "Il fratello di Natalina"
2009	Romanzo criminale – La serie	Ilaria	Episode: "Episode 9"
2009	Le segretarie del sesto	Treccia	Miniseries
2010–2011	Tutti pazzi per amore	Bea	Guest role (season 2); 2 episodes
2011	Un Natale per due	Gioia	Television film
2012	Nero Wolfe	Emilia Stoppani	Episode: "Il patto dei sei"
2016	Matrimoni e altre follie	Giusy Ballarin	Main role; 24 episodes
2016	Purché finisca bene	Isa Martelli	Episode: "Piccoli segreti, grandi bugie"
2016–2018	Non dirlo al mio capo	Perla Cercilli-Assuntina Capotondi	Main role; 24 episodes
2021–present	Drag Race Italia	Herself/ Judge	Italian version of RuPaul's Drag Race
2023	Sanremo Music Festival 2023	Herself / co-host	Annual music festival
