= My Big Gay Italian Wedding (film) =

- Theatrical release poster
- Italian: Puoi baciare lo sposo
- Directed by: Alessandro Genovesi
- Screenplay by: Giovanni Bognetti; Alessandro Genovesi
- Story by: Alessandro Genovesi
- Based on: My Big Gay Italian Wedding by Anthony J. Wilkinson
- Produced by: Maurizio Totti; Alessandro Usai
- Starring: Diego Abatantuono; Monica Guerritore; Salvatore Esposito; Cristiano Caccamo; Dino Abbrescia; Diana Del Bufalo; Beatrice Arnera; Rosaria D'Urso; Antonio Catania; Enzo Miccio
- Cinematography: Federico Masiero
- Edited by: Claudio Di Mauro
- Music by: Andrea Farri
- Production companies: Medusa Film; Colorado Film; Rainbow S.p.A.
- Distributed by: Medusa Film
- Release date: 1 March 2018
- Running time: 91 minutes
- Country: Italy
- Language: Italian
- Box office: € 2,222,809

My Big Gay Italian Wedding (Italian: Puoi baciare lo sposo, lit. 'You can kiss the groom') is a 2018 Italian romantic comedy film directed by Alessandro Genovesi. It is based on the off-Broadway play My Big Gay Italian Wedding by Anthony J. Wilkinson. The film stars Salvatore Esposito and Cristiano Caccamo as fiancés Paolo and Antonio; Diego Abatantuono and Monica Guerritore as Roberto and Anna, Antonio's parents; and Dino Abbrescia and Diana Del Bufalo as Donato and Benedetta, Antonio and Paolo's flatmates.

== Plot ==
In Berlin, Antonio proposes to his live-in boyfriend, Paolo, who says yes. Paolo asks if he can accompany Antonio back to his Italian village, Civita di Bagnoregio, for Easter, which Paolo suggests is a good time for Antonio to come out to his parents. Antonio and Paolo arrive in Civita with their flatmates Benedetta and Donato, and Antonio nervously announces his news at dinner. Antonio's father, Roberto, is shocked. His mother Anna announces that she is excited to celebrate the wedding, but she has conditions: it must happen in Civita; she will hire famous wedding planner Enzo Miccio; as mayor, Roberto will officiate the ceremony; and Paolo's mother must attend. Paolo explains that he has not spoken to his mother for three years since her negative reaction to the news that he is gay, but Anna is adamant. Roberto refuses to perform the ceremony yet is willing to attend the wedding elsewhere, but Anna exiles him from the house until he changes his mind. Anna brings Antonio and Paolo to Father Francesco, who agrees to help them convince Roberto, and to officiate the wedding if they are unsuccessful.

With Antonio, Benendetta and Donato in tow, Paolo reluctantly visits his mother in Naples to invite her to the wedding. She has no interest, and cross-dresser Donato offers to pose as Paolo's mother. Enzo enlists the entire town to create the beautiful wedding Anna is expecting at a local ruined church. Antonio's ex-girlfriend Camilla is still in love with him, and her attempts to insinuate herself into his new life make Paolo temporarily doubt Antonio's devotion. Anna threatens to file for divorce if Roberto does not capitulate. He, in turn, sets the wedding venue on fire, and has to be rescued by Antonio and Paolo. The next day, Roberto officiates the ceremony in the town square. Donato walks Paolo down the aisle dressed as a woman, but Paolo is pleasantly surprised to see that his real mother Vincenza is already there. Camilla interrupts the wedding with the reveal that she and Antonio slept together once after he and Paolo were together. Upset, Paolo moves to leave, but Antonio stops him by professing his love and singing "Don't Leave Me This Way", joined by the wedding guests.

== Cast ==
- Diego Abatantuono as Roberto Brambilla, Antonio's father, the mayor of Civita. He is proud of his supposedly progressive views, but proves to be less tolerant of his son's homosexuality.
- Monica Guerritore as Anna Di Gastoni, Antonio's mother. She is much more accepting of Antonio's lifestyle, but she has nonnegotiable conditions for his wedding, and delivers multiple ultimatums to Roberto in an effort to make him comply.
- Salvatore Esposito as Paolo Baiello, Antonio's fiancé. He is a "burly, bearded guy not totally unlike Antonio's dad", and is estranged from his own mother.
- Cristiano Caccamo as Antonio Brambilla, an Italian actor living in Berlin. After Paolo accepts his proposal, Antonio realizes he needs to tell his parents, who do not know he is gay.
- Dino Abbrescia as Donato Lavopa, Antonio and Paolo's "chatty new flatmate who is battling personal issues and cannot be left alone", thus accompanying the group to Civita even though the others barely know him.
- Diana Del Bufalo, Benedetta Stanchi, Antonio and Paolo's "skittish" and "no-filters" flatmate and landlady. Jake Wilson of The Age called Benedetta "easily the film's campiest character."
- Beatrice Arnera as Camilla Fonteggi, Antonio's "childhood-friend-and-brief-fling-turned-semi-psycho-stalker." She cannot accept that Antonio is gay, and will go to any lengths to get him to love her.
- Rosaria D'Urso as Vincenza Quintone, Paolo's estranged mother
- Antonio Catania as Father Francesco Palmisani. He is a Franciscan friar and family friend who offers to marry Antonio and Paolo in a deconsecrated church if Roberto fails to change his mind.
- Enzo Miccio as himself

== Production ==
Based on the off-Broadway play My Big Gay Italian Wedding by Anthony J. Wilkinson, the film was co-written by Giovanni Bognetti and Alessandro Genovesi, and directed by Genovesi. The cinematographer was Federico Masiero.

== Release ==
My Big Gay Italian Wedding was released in Italy on 1 March 2018. The same month, Breaking Glass Pictures acquired the US distribution rights to the film.

== Critical reception ==
On review aggregator Rotten Tomatoes, the film has an approval ratings of 67% based on 6 reviews, with an average score of 5.65/10.

Matthew Breen of NewNowNext explained, "With overtones of The Birdcage and Mamma Mia, the film toys playfully with Italy's lingering homophobia, preventing Italian same-sex couples from getting full marriage (rather than 'skim-milk'-style civil partnership)." Jake Wilson of The Age wrote that the film "aims to cater to the public while challenging it just a little—not by overturning accepted notions about family, gender or religion, but by demonstrating that same-sex unions pose no threat to these notions when things are properly understood." Steve Warren of the Windy City Times called the film "fun", and suggested that it was intended to help make Italians more receptive to the same-sex civil unions made legal in Italy two years before. Broadway World wrote that "the aisle to the altar is paved with hilarity, hijinks, and lots of love", and Leigh Andrew Hill of OutInPerth stated that "this romantic comedy will leave you on a high." Matthew Toomey of The Film Pie called the film "a likeable crowd pleaser with plenty of genuine giggles", praising the cast and the "nice mix of scenes that balance the craziness with the tenderness." He noted, "Every character in the film has self-generated problems and instead of going for the obvious solution, they follow romantic comedy clichés and make life as difficult as possible." Toomey also criticized the script for rushing through some storylines, which he felt was "most evident during the quick-fire climax where some of the character transformations lack credibility." Pietrangelo Buttafuoco of Il Foglio called Abbrescia a scene stealer, and noted that in the film, Italian comedy lends itself to teach viewers a lesson. D. M. Bradley of the Adelaide Review wrote that the film places "serious, weightily-themed drama alongside audience-pleasing laughs", but noted that it "has a nice cast and a tough edge, but throws it all frustratingly away." He added that the "grievous sin" of an ending "casts all plot threads aside" in a sequence that "demonstrates that Genovesi (and Wilkinson) simply didn't know how to end it." Alex First of The Blurb called the film "absurdist" and "an embarrassment", criticizing the characterizations and the lack of chemistry between the leads.
