= The Worst Christmas of My Life =

- Film poster
- Italian: Il peggior Natale della mia vita
- Directed by: Alessandro Genovesi
- Written by: Alessandro Genovesi; Fabio De Luigi
- Produced by: Maurizio Totti
- Starring: Fabio De Luigi; Cristiana Capotondi; Antonio Catania; Anna Bonaiuto; Dino Abbrescia; Laura Chiatti; Diego Abatantuono
- Cinematography: Federico Masiero
- Edited by: Claudio Di Mauro
- Music by: Andrea Guerra
- Production company: Colorado Film
- Distributed by: Warner Bros. Pictures
- Release date: November 22, 2012
- Running time: 86 minutes
- Country: Italy
- Language: Italian
- Box office: $10,2 million

The Worst Christmas of My Life (Italian: Il peggior Natale della mia vita) is a 2012 Italian comedy film directed by Alessandro Genovesi and starring Fabio De Luigi and Cristiana Capotondi. It is the sequel of The Worst Week of My Life.

It was a commercial success, grossing $10,275,097 at the Italian box office.

== Plot ==
Paolo needs to reach the castle of Alberto Caccia, where he is invited to spend Christmas holidays with his wife Margherita, at the ninth month of pregnancy, and her family. Among various mishaps and blunders, Paolo will come to make everyone believe, because of a misunderstanding, that Alberto is dead because of his fault.

== Cast ==
- Fabio De Luigi as Paolo
- Cristiana Capotondi as Margherita
- Antonio Catania as Giorgio
- Anna Bonaiuto as Clara
- Dino Abbrescia as Pino
- Laura Chiatti as Benedetta
- Diego Abatantuono as Alberto Caccia
- Andrea Mingardi as Dino
- Ale e Franz as The Gravediggers

== See also ==
- List of Christmas films
- List of Italian films of 2012
