= 2014 in Italian television =

This is a list of Italian television related events from 2014.

== Events ==
- 26 May – Micro Petrilli wins the thirteenth season of Grande Fratello.
- 5 June – Cristina Scuccia, a Catholic nun whose blind audition became an international viral hit on YouTube, wins the second season of The Voice of Italy.
- 6 December – Racewalker Giusy Versace and her partner Raimondo Todaro win the tenth season of Ballando con le stelle.
- 11 December – Lorenzo Fragola wins the eighth season of X Factor.

== Debuts ==
=== Serials ===
- Purché finisca bene ("As long as it ends well") – by Fabrizio Costa and others; 4 seasons. It is a cycle of comedies, without recurring actors or characters, inspired by optimism and good feelings, also when treating serious matters, as the economic crisis.
- Braccialetti rossi ("Red bracelets") – by Giacomo Campiotti, with Carmine Buschini and Aurora Ruffino, Italian version of the Spanish Polseres vermelles; 3 seasons.
- Una pallottola nel cuore ("A bullet in the heart") – by Luca Manfredi, with Gigi Proietti and Francesca Inaudi; 3 seasons. Proietti is Bruno Palmieri, a crime reporter, active and brave also if, after an attempted murder, he lives with a bullet in the chest.

== Television shows ==
=== Drama ===
- Beauty and the beast, by Fabrizio Costa, with Bianca Suarez and Alessandro Preziosi, from the homonymous fable; 2 episodes.

==== Biopic ====
- Per amore del mio popolo ("For my people's love") – biopic by Antonio Frazzi, with Alessandro Preziosi as don Giuseppe Diana; 2 episodes.
- Qualunque cosa succeda – ("Whenever it happens") – biopic by Albeto Negrin, with Pierfrancesco Favino as Giorgio Ambrosoli.
- Mister Ignis, l'operaio che fondò un impero ("Mister Ignis, the laborer who founded an empire") – biopic by Luciano Manuzzi, with Lorenzo Flaherty as the domestic appliance tycoon Giovanni Borghi; 2 episodes.
- La strada dritta ("The straight road") by Carmine Elia, with Ennio Fantastichini as Giuseppe Cova (the engineer who designed the Sun Motorway) and Anita Caprioli; 2 episodes.

=== Miniseries ===
- Un'altra vita ("Another life") – by Cinzia TH Torrini, with Vanessa Incontrada and Daniele Lotti; 6 episodes. An upper class woman, whose existence has been upset by her husband's arrest, tries to rebuild a life as medical officer in Ponza.
- Orfani ("Orphans") – cartoon by Armando Traverso, from the Roberto Recchioni and Emiliano Mammucari's comics; 10 episodes. In an apocalyptic future, a commando of children fights against the aliens invaders.

=== Serials ===
- Impazienti ("The impatient ones") – sit-com by Celeste Laudisio, with Enrico Bertolino and Max Tortora. Two crocks, for an insurance scam, are forced to a long cohabitation in an hospital, even though they can't stand each other.
- Il candidato – Zucca presidente ("The candidate – Zucca for president"), sit-com by Ludovico Bassegato, with Filippo Timi, Lunetta Savino and Bebo Storti; 2 seasons. Italian version of the French Hènaut prèsident, it's the story of a postman become politician, honest but absolutely incompetent, and handled by his cynical staff.

=== News and educationals. ===
- Alla scoperta del Vaticano ("Discovering the Vatican City") – by Alberto Angela; 6 episodes.

=== 2000s ===
- Grande Fratello (2000–present)
- Ballando con le stelle (2005–present)
- X Factor (2008–present)

=== 2010s ===
- Italia's Got Talent (2010–present)
- The Voice of Italy (2013–present)

== Networks and services ==
=== Launches ===
Network	Type	Launch date	Notes	Source
LaC TV	Cable and satellite	Unknown		
Fine Living	Cable and satellite	26 March		
Sky Atlantic	Cable and satellite	9 April		
Fox Animation	Cable and satellite	1 November		
Fox Comedy	Cable and satellite	1 November		

=== Closures ===
Network	Type	Closure date	Notes	Source
Fox Retro	Cable and satellite	31 December		

== See also ==
- 2014 in Italy
- List of Italian films of 2014
