= Happy Family (2010 film) =

- DVD cover
- Directed by: Gabriele Salvatores
- Written by: Alessandro Genovesi; Gabriele Salvatores
- Produced by: Maurizio Totti
- Starring: Fabio De Luigi; Diego Abatantuono; Fabrizio Bentivoglio; Margherita Buy; Carla Signoris; Valeria Bilello
- Cinematography: Italo Petriccione
- Music by: Louis Siciliano
- Release date: March 2010 (Los Angeles)
- Running time: 90 minutes
- Country: Italy
- Language: Italian

Happy Family is a 2010 Italian comedy film directed by Gabriele Salvatores. It was inspired by Luigi Pirandello's Six Characters in Search of an Author.

The film won the Best Editing award at the 2010 Nastro d'Argento ceremony.

== Plot ==
Ezio is a screenwriter scared by happy endings, who earns his living thanks to an invention of his father. He is going through a creative crisis, until he has a car crash with Anna, who invites him to dinner. Once there, the stories of several characters get interwoven, triggered by the decision of the 16 year-old Filippo, Anna's son, to get married. Dinner's attendees become the characters of Ezio's new screenplay, but they will try to interfere with his work.

== Cast ==
- Fabrizio Bentivoglio: Vincenzo
- Margherita Buy: Anna
- Valeria Bilello: Caterina
- Fabio De Luigi: Ezio
- Corinna Agustoni: Grandmother Anna
- Gianmaria Biancuzzi: Filippo
- Alice Croci: Marta
- Diego Abatantuono: Marta's father
- Carla Signoris: Marta's mother
- Sandra Milo: Ezio's mother
