= Women vs. Men =

2011 Italian comedy film

- Film poster
- Italian: Femmine contro maschi
- Directed by: Fausto Brizzi
- Written by: Fausto Brizzi; Marco Martani; Massimiliano Bruno; Valeria Di Napoli
- Starring: Claudio Bisio; Nancy Brilli; Salvatore Ficarra; Valentino Picone; Francesca Inaudi; Luciana Littizzetto; Emilio Solfrizzi
- Cinematography: Marcello Montarsi
- Edited by: Luciana Pandolfelli
- Music by: Bruno Zambrini
- Release date: 4 February 2011
- Running time: 96 minutes
- Country: Italy
- Language: Italian

Women vs. Men (Italian: Femmine contro maschi) is a 2011 Italian comedy film directed by Fausto Brizzi.

The film is a sequel to 2010 Men vs. Women (Maschi contro femmine).

== Cast ==
- Claudio Bisio as Marcello
- Nancy Brilli as Paola
- Salvatore Ficarra as Rocco
- Valentino Picone as Michele
- Francesca Inaudi as Valeria
- Luciana Littizzetto as Anna
- Emilio Solfrizzi as Piero
- Serena Autieri as Diana
- Giuseppe Cederna as Renato
- Paola Cortellesi as Chiara
- Wilma De Angelis as Clara
- Fabio De Luigi as Walter Bertocchi
- Chiara Francini as Marta
- Lucia Ocone as Monica
- Alessandro Preziosi as Diego
- Paolo Ruffini as Ivan
- Carla Signoris as Nicoletta
- Nicolas Vaporidis as Andrea
- Giorgia Würth as Eva Castelli
- Gigio Alberti as Doctor Pandolfelli
- Rosabell Laurenti Sellers as Flavia
- Edoardo Cesari as Lorenzo
- Marta Zoffoli as Lisa
- Metis Di Meo as Tatiana
- Armando De Razza as Roberto
- Fabrizio Rizzolo as Doctor Morra
- Matteo Urzia as Alberto
- Hassani Shapi as the Pakistani guy
- Tongquing Ke as In-Su-Li
- Sarah Felberbaum as Francesca
- Enzo Salvi as the boor
- Francesca Piccinini as herself
