= List of 2012 box office number-one films in Italy =

This is a list of films which have placed number one at the weekly box office in Italy during 2012.

== Number-one films ==
†	This implies the highest-grossing movie of the year.

#	Date	Film	Total Gross	Notes
1	January 8, 2012	Immaturi - Il viaggio	$15,512,578	
2	January 15, 2012	Immaturi - Il viaggio		
3	January 22, 2012	Benvenuti al Nord †	$33,498,625	
4	January 29, 2012	Benvenuti al Nord †		
5	February 5, 2012	Benvenuti al Nord †		
6	February 12, 2012	Com'è bello far l'amore	$9,065,716	
7	February 19, 2012	Com'è bello far l'amore		
8	February 26, 2012	Journey 2: The Mysterious Island	$5,908,558	
9	March 4, 2012	A Flat for Three	$11,398,541	
10	March 11, 2012	A Flat for Three		
11	March 18, 2012	The Intouchables	$19,385,193	
12	March 25, 2012	Ghost Rider: Spirit of Vengeance	$3,731,609	
13	April 1, 2012	Wrath of the Titans	$5,447,003	
14	April 8, 2012	Titanic 3D	$9,847,064	
15	April 15, 2012	Battleship	$5,747,869	
16	April 22, 2012	To Rome with Love	$9,565,012	
17	April 29, 2012	Marvel's The Avengers	$22,012,517	
18	May 6, 2012	American Reunion	$7,878,279	
19	May 13, 2012	Dark Shadows	$8,830,490	
20	May 20, 2012	Dark Shadows		
21	May 27, 2012	Men in Black 3	$7,671,850	
22	June 3, 2012	Men in Black 3		
23	June 10, 2012	Men in Black 3		
24	June 17, 2012	The Dictator	$3,337,936	
25	June 24, 2012	The Dictator		
26	July 1, 2012	The Dictator		
27	July 8, 2012	The Amazing Spider-Man	$15,502,063	
28	July 15, 2012	Snow White and the Huntsman	$11,463,994	
29	July 22, 2012	Snow White and the Huntsman		
30	July 29, 2012	Snow White and the Huntsman		
31	August 5, 2012	Snow White and the Huntsman		
32	August 12, 2012	Snow White and the Huntsman		
33	August 19, 2012	The Expendables 2	$7,082,046	
34	August 26, 2012	Madagascar 3: Europe's Most Wanted	$28,057,921	
35	September 2, 2012	Madagascar 3: Europe's Most Wanted		
36	September 9, 2012	The Dark Knight Rises	$18,801,748	
37	September 16, 2012	Prometheus	$6,499,130	
38	September 23, 2012	Magic Mike	$5,032,03	
39	September 30, 2012	Ice Age: Continental Drift	$21,459,516	
40	October 7, 2012	Ice Age: Continental Drift		
41	October 14, 2012	Ted	$14,054,547	
42	October 21, 2012	Ted		
43	October 28, 2012	Viva L'Italia	$6,880,371	
44	November 4, 2012	Skyfall	$16,783,632	
45	November 11, 2012	Skyfall		
46	November 18, 2012	The Twilight Saga: Breaking Dawn - Part 2	$24,062,547	
47	November 25, 2012	The Twilight Saga: Breaking Dawn - Part 2		
48	December 2, 2012	Rise of the Guardians	$5,788,535	
49	December 9, 2012	Rise of the Guardians		
50	December 16, 2012	The Hobbit: An Unexpected Journey	$10,666,115	
