= One Day in a Life =

- Directed by: Stefano Tummolini
- Starring: Antonio Merone; Lucia Mascino; Francesco Grifoni; Chiara Francini; Tiziana Avarista; Mario Grossi
- Cinematography: Raoul Torresi
- Music by: Francesco Maddaloni
- Release date: 2008
- Language: Italian

One Day in a Life (Italian: Un altro pianeta) is a 2008 Italian drama film directed by Stefano Tummolini. It entered the "Venice Days" section at the 65th Venice International Film Festival.

== Cast ==
- Antonio Merone: Salvatore
- Lucia Mascino: Daniela
- Francesco Grifoni: Cristiano
- Chiara Francini: Stella
- Tiziana Avarista: Eva
