= Greenery Will Bloom Again =

- Directed by: Ermanno Olmi
- Written by: Ermanno Olmi
- Based on: "La paura" by Federico De Roberto
- Starring: Claudio Santamaria
- Cinematography: Fabio Olmi
- Music by: Paolo Fresu
- Release date: November 6, 2014
- Running time: 80 minutes
- Language: Italian

Greenery Will Bloom Again (Italian: Torneranno i prati) is a 2014 Italian anti-war film written and directed by Ermanno Olmi. Set in the trenches of the Asiago plateau, during World War I, it is loosely based on the short story "La paura" (1921) by Federico De Roberto. It was screened in the Berlinale Special section at the 65th Berlin International Film Festival. The film received eight nominations at the 2015 David di Donatello Awards, including best film and best director. This is the last film to have been solely written and directed by Ermanno Olmi, before his death in 2018.

== Cast ==
- Claudio Santamaria as The Major
- Alessandro Sperduti as The Lieutenant
- Francesco Formichetti as The Captain
- Andrea Di Maria as The Mule's Driver
- Camillo Grassi as The Orderly
- Niccolò Senni as The Forgotten
- Domenico Benetti as The Sergeant
- Andrea Benetti as The Corporal
- Francesco Nardelli as Soldier Toni
- Niccolò Tredese as the delirious soldier

== See also ==
- List of Italian films of 2014
