= Andrea Mingardi =

Italian singer-songwriter and writer

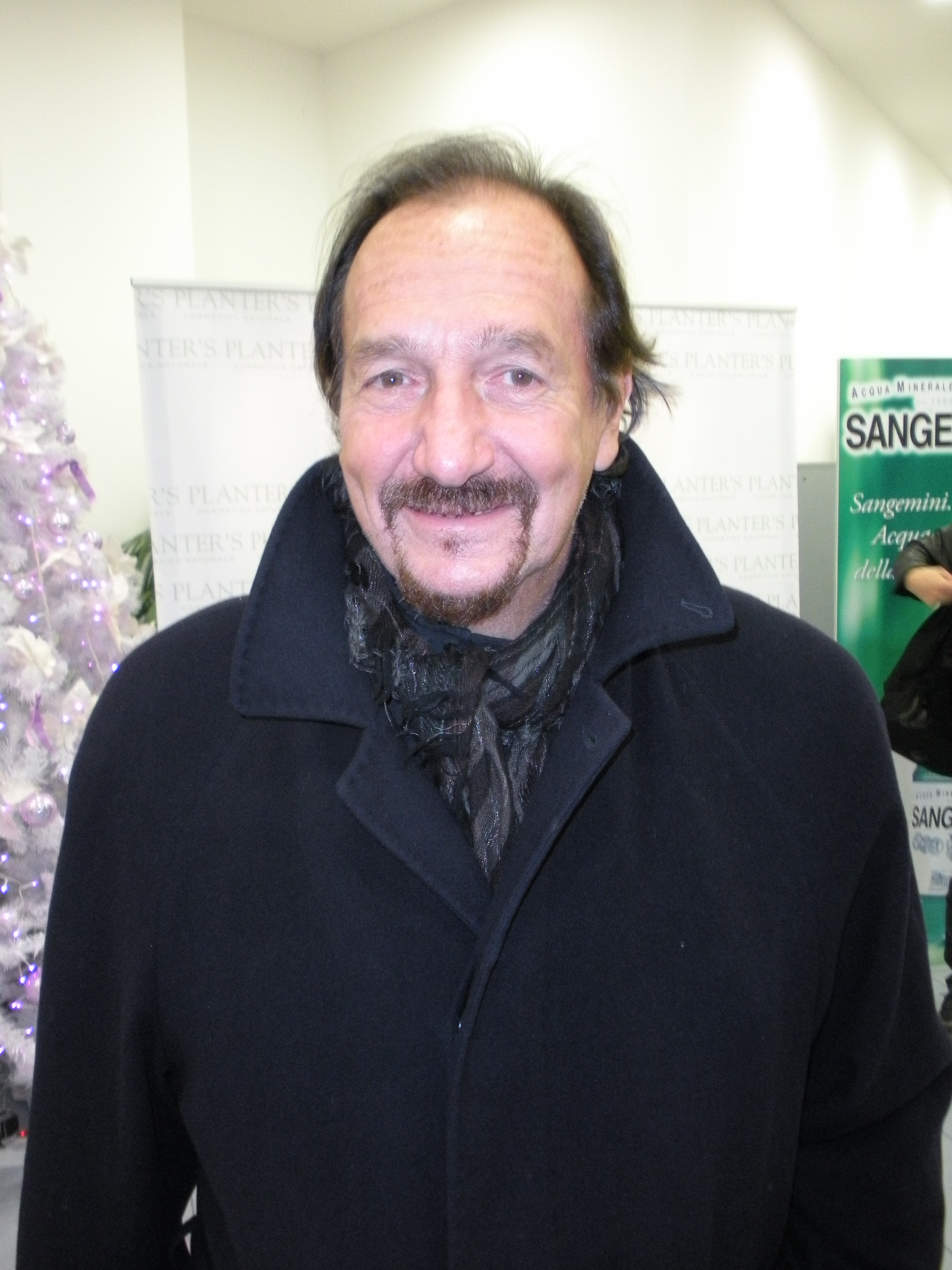
- Born: 1 August 1940 (age 86); Bologna, Italy

Andrea Mingardi (born 1 August 1940) is an Italian singer-songwriter, composer, musician, author and occasional actor.

== Life and career ==
Born in Bologna, Mingardi approached the music at young age, founding the group "Golden Rock Boys" in 1959.

His debut album Nessuno siam perfetti, ciascuno abbiamo i suoi difetti was released in 1974, while he got his first commercial success in 1976 with the song "Datemi della musica". In 1984 he participated at the Festivalbar presenting the ironical song "Un boa nella canoa", then, after less successful songs, in 1992 he achieved some success with "Con un amico vicino", a duet with Alessandro Bono which ranked third in the "Giovani" section at the Sanremo Music Festival. He later participated four more times at the Sanremo Festival, in 1993, 1994 and 1998 with the romantic ballads "Sogno", "Amare Amare Amare" and "Canto per te", and in 2004 with the funky-rhythm and blues "E' la musica" (a duet with The Blues Brothers). In 2006 he composed six songs of the Mina's album Bau, also duetting with her in the single "Mogol/Battisti".

Mingardi wrote several books about the Bolognese dialect as well as some novels.

== Discography ==
=== Album ===
- 1974 - Nessuno siam perfetti, ciascuno abbiamo i suoi difetti (Cipiti Record, LP OK 14)
- 1976 - Datemi della musica (Dischi Ricordi SMRL 6196)
- 1977 - Lo sfighè, Gisto e Cesira, Delone, un marziano e altre storie (Dischi Ricordi ORL 8099)
- 1977 - A iò vest un marzian (Dischi Ricordi ORL 8797)
- 1978 - Zabajone (Dischi Ricordi SMRL 6219)
- 1981 - Xa vut dalla vetta (F 1 Team DM 919)
- 1985 - Eccitanti conflitti confusi (Dischi Ricordi SMRL 6336)
- 1988 - Prossimamente (Fonit Cetra CDM 2060)
- 1990 - Si sente dire in giro (Fonit Cetra CDL 264)
- 1992 - Andrea Mingardi (Epic Records 471405)
- 1993 - Sogno (Epic Records 473569)
- 1994 - 6- al duemila (Epic Records 475914)
- 1996 - Paura di volare (Replay Music Special RMCD 8012)
- 1997 - C'è un boa nella canoa (Joker CM 22148)
- 1998 - Canto per te (Columbia COL 489585-2)
- 1999 - Live on the boat
- 2000 - Ciao Ràgaz (AM Record C 11 02 2000)
- 2004 - È la musica (Edel Music 0154703 BGE)
- 2006 - Sfighè (AM Record MS 001)
- 2006 - Come ridevamo (AM Record MS 001)
- 2007 - Andrea Mingardi canta Ray Charles - Tribute to the Genius - Live (A-PERIODICO 9 771124 211610)
- 2012 - Auguri auguri auguri (SAIFAM distr. HALIDON)

== Filmography ==
- Italian Boys (1982)
- Flipper (1983)
- The Worst Week of My Life (2011)
- The Worst Christmas of My Life (2012)
