= Alessandro Bono =

Italian singer-songwriter

- Born: Alessandro Pizzamiglio; 21 July 1964; Milan, Italy
- Died: 15 May 1994 (aged 29); Milan, Italy
- Occupation: Singer-songwriter

Alessandro Pizzamiglio (21 July 1964 – 15 May 1994), best known as Alessandro Bono, was an Italian singer-songwriter.

== Life and career ==
Born in Milan, Bono started recording demos in 1983, under the production of Alberto Brioschi, and was also the first choice to record "Terra promessa", the song which eventually launched the career of Eros Ramazzotti. He made his official debut in 1985 as Alex Bono, entering the Festivalbar with the song "Walkie Talkie".

In 1987, Bono entered the newcomers competition at the 37th edition of the Sanremo Music Festival with "Nel mio profondo fondo". His debut self-titled album was producer by Mario Lavezzi and Mogol and was released in 1988, receiving mostly favourable reviews from critics.

Between the late 1980s and the early 1990s, Bono was opening act in concerts of important artists such as Bob Dylan, Tracy Chapman, Francesco De Gregori, David Crosby and Gino Paoli. He returned to compete at the Sanremo Music Festival in 1992 with a duet with Andrea Mingardi, "Con un amico vicino", and in 1994 with "Oppure no".

Bono died of AIDS on May 15, 1994, aged 29 years old. A tribute album was released in July 2015.

== Discography ==
Album

- 1988 - Alessandro Bono (CBS)
- 1991 - Caccia alla volpe (Sony Music)
- 1994 - Oppure no (Sony Music)
