= Gledis Cinque =

Italian actress

- Born: 15 June 1985 (age 40); Lecco, Lombardy, Italy
- Occupation: Actress
- Years active: 2004–present

Gledis Cinque (born June 15, 1985) is an Italian actress.

== Biography ==
Gledis Cinque made her film debut with the role of Celia Crawley in Mira Nair's 2004 film Vanity Fair, with Reese Witherspoon and James Purefoy. After that very first experience she continued studying acting gaining a diploma at Centro Studi Coreografici Teatro Carcano in Milan as well as attending various courses at RADA, LAMDA, NYFA and at the Stella Adler Studio of Acting.

In 2008 she appeared in Sanguepazzo directed by Marco Tullio Giordana alongside Luca Zingaretti and Alessio Boni. In 2009 Gledis appeared in Luis Prieto's Meno male che ci sei as Giada, and Sette, Corriere della Sera's weekly magazine, named her one of the most promising young Italian actresses. In 2009 she also appeared in Non smettere di sognare, where she played the supporting role of Daniela, a ballet dancer, alongside Alessandra Mastronardi.

In 2010 Gledis played the recurring role of Cecilia in the TV miniseries Notte prima degli esami '82, directed by Elisabetta Marchetti.

In 2012 she worked in the TV series Distretto di Polizia XI, in Hermes Cavagnini's first feature Ritratto di un Imprenditore di Provincia, and in Fausto Brizzi's film Love Is in the Air.

In 2013 she finished the shooting of the feature film Miriam - Il Diario (Come Sposare un Artista), directed by Monica Castiglioni, in which she played the lead character. In 2013 she also played the lead in the feature film The Rule of Lead (La Regola del Piombo) by Giacomo Arrigoni, that won several international awards.

In 2014 she plays one of the three leads in the web-series Sguinzagliate, directed by di Roberto Burchielli. In 2015 she landed a small role in the TV series River, directed by Tim Fywell for BBC. She then went back to comedy with the role of Elena in the sketch comedy Love Snack, directed by Elia Castangia in 2017.

With her theatre company "PaT - Passi Teatrali" she co-produced the feature Luci Spente, adapted from an original play performed by the company itself, that won the Gold Remi Award for "Animation Film - Any Technique" at the 2016 WorldFest Houston.

In 2018, after a very successful crowdfunding, she resumed her role as the lead in Ischidados, an original production by Chunk Collective.

She also played the part of Irene Pivetti, an Italian politician, in the upcoming TV series 1994, the sequel of 1992 and 1993, directed by Giuseppe Gagliardi and produced by Wildside and Sky Italia.

== Filmography ==
Year	Title	Director	Role	Notes
2004	Vanity Fair	Mira Nair	Older Celia Crawley	
2008	Sanguepazzo	Marco Tullio Giordana	Collegiale	
2009	Non smettere di sognare	Roberto Burchielli	Daniela	TV movie
2009	Meno Male Che Ci Sei	Luis Prieto	Giada	
2011	Notte Prima degli Esami '82	Elisabetta Marchetti	Cecilia	TV miniseries
2012	Love Is in the Air	Fausto Brizzi	Martina	
2013	Ritratto di un imprenditore di provincia	Hermes Cavagnini	Vittoria Gandolfi	
2014	Miriam - Il diario	Monica Castiglioni	Miriam (lead)	
2014	La Regola del Piombo	Giacomo Arrigoni	Lara (lead)	
2014	Sguinzagliate	Roberto Burchielli	Ilaria (lead)	Web-series
2015	Luci Spente	Edoardo Lomazzi	Laura Locke	
2015	River	Tim Fywell	Au Pair	(BBC) TV Series
2017	Love Snack	Elia Castangia	Elena	Sketch comedy
2018	Ischidados	Eugenio Villani, Igor de Luigi	Gaia (lead)	
2018	1994	Giuseppe Gagliardi	Irene Pivetti	TV series
