= Emilio Solfrizzi =

Italian actor and comedian

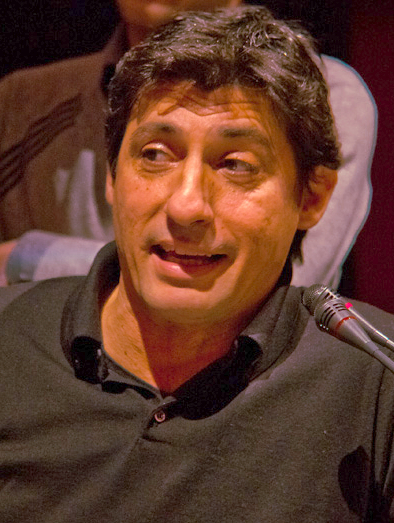
- Born: 5 April 1962 (age 64); Bari
- Occupation: actor
- Height: 1.78 m (5 ft 10 in)

Emilio Solfrizzi (born 5 April 1962) is an Italian actor and comedian.

== Life and career ==
Born in Bari, in 1985 Solfrizzi graduated in performing arts at the Bologna University. Shortly later he formed a comedy duo with his former classmate Antonio Stornaiolo, Toti e Tata, who had a good success on stages all over Italy. In the second half of the 1990s he appeared, still in couple with Stornaiolo, in the variety show Striscia la notizia with the successful character of Linguetta, then he started a solo career as actor and comedian.

In 2011, Solfrizzi won the Nastro d'Argento for best original song as the composer and singer of "Amami di più", main theme of the comedy film Se sei così ti dico sì.

== Selected filmography ==
- La stazione (1990)
- Selvaggi (1995)
- Marriages (1998)
- Outlaw (1999)
- Free the Fish (2000)
- El Alamein: The Line of Fire (2002)
- Forever (2003)
- Agata and the Storm (2004)
- Luisa Sanfelice (2004)
- Our Land (2006)
- 2061: An Exceptional Year (2007)
- Men vs. Women (2010)
- Women vs. Men (2011)
- Se sei così, ti dico sì (2011)
- Mi rifaccio vivo (2013)
- A Fairy-Tale Wedding (2014)
- School of Mafia (2021)
- Love in the Villa (2022)
