= Vanity Fair (2004 film) =

- Theatrical release poster
- Directed by: Mira Nair
- Screenplay by: Julian Fellowes; Matthew Faulk; Mark Skeet
- Based on: Vanity Fair; 1848 novel by William Makepeace Thackeray
- Produced by: Janette Day; Donna Gigliotti; Lydia Dean Pilcher
- Starring: Reese Witherspoon; Eileen Atkins; Jim Broadbent; Gabriel Byrne; Romola Garai; Bob Hoskins; Rhys Ifans; James Purefoy; Jonathan Rhys Meyers
- Cinematography: Declan Quinn
- Edited by: Allyson C. Johnson; Nishikesh Mehra
- Music by: Mychael Danna
- Production company: Granada Productions
- Distributed by: Focus Features (United States); Universal Pictures (United Kingdom, through United International Pictures)
- Release dates: September 1, 2004 (United States); January 14, 2005 (United Kingdom)
- Running time: 141 minutes
- Countries: United Kingdom; United States
- Language: English
- Budget: $23 million
- Box office: $19.4 million

Vanity Fair is a 2004 historical drama film directed by Mira Nair and adapted from William Makepeace Thackeray's 1848 novel of the same name. The novel has been the subject of numerous television and film adaptations. Nair's version made notable changes in the development of the main character Becky Sharp, played by Reese Witherspoon.

The film was nominated for the Golden Lion at the 2004 Venice Film Festival. It was released theatrically on September 1, 2004 in the United States and on January 14, 2005 in the United Kingdom. It received mixed reviews from critics.

== Plot ==
In 1800s England, Becky Sharp, the orphaned daughter of a poor painter, has finished her studies and offered to be a governess to Sir Pitt Crawley's daughters. Before starting, she travels to London with her close friend Amelia Sedley and her family. While there she begins a campaign to charm Amelia's awkward and overweight brother "Jos" Sedley, a wealthy trader living in India. Smitten with Becky, he almost proposes, but is dissuaded by Amelia's snobbish fiancé George Osborne, reminding him that Becky has no dowry.

Not finding a rich husband, Becky takes up her post. Horrified by the house and her employer Sir Pitt, she diligently teaches his daughters and prepares the house for his half-sister Miss Crawley. His youngest son, Rawdon Crawley, an army captain, comes with them and immediately fancies Becky. She manages to secure a post with ill-tempered Miss Crawley.

Meanwhile, Amelia's prospective father-in-law, Mr. Osborne, is trying to arrange a more advantageous marriage for his son George. When George refuses to consider her, Mr. Osborne bankrupts Mr. Sedley, forcing George to break his engagement to Amelia. She now lives in squalor with her family but is hopeful he will come for her, believing the gift of a piano from George's friend Dobbin is from George himself.

Rawdon Crawley and Becky marry secretly, but Miss Crawley soon finds out expelling her from her house and disinheriting Rawdon. George Osborne marries Amelia, rebelling against his father, and is soon after deployed with Dobbin and Rawdon to Belgium, as Napoleon escaped Elba and returned to France. Becky and Amelia accompany their husbands. The newly-wedded Osborne tires of Amelia, and hits on Becky. The ball they are attending is interrupted by an announcement that Napoleon has attacked, and they must march in three hours. Before leaving, Rawdon gives Becky all he's won at cards. The next day, as she tries to flee the city, she sees Amelia in the mob and leaves her carriage to be with her in Brussels, waiting out the battle.

In the ensuing Battle of Waterloo, George is killed and Rawdon survives. Amelia bears his son, also named George. Mr. Osborne refuses to acknowledge his grandson, so Amelia returns to live in poverty with her parents. Now-Major William Dobbin, young George's godfather, continues to show his love for the widowed Amelia by small kindnesses. She is too in love with George's memory to return Dobbin's affections. Saddened, he transfers to an army post in India. Meanwhile, Becky's son is also named after his father.

Several years pass. Rawdon has been passed over for inheritance by both his aunt and father, and they are sinking deep into debt. Amelia struggles to raise her son and reluctantly gives him up to be raised by his grandfather Mr. Osborne, for a fine education and lifestyle. Bailiffs arrive to repossess the Crawleys' furniture, but Becky is saved by their neighbor Lord Steyne, who she remembers from the past as a keen buyer of her father's paintings. He becomes her patron, giving her money and introducing her to London high society.

On the night of her triumphant presentation to King George IV, Becky receives word that Rawdon has been arrested and thrown into debtors' prison. Lord Steyne insists she spends the night with him in return for the services he has rendered her, and Rawdon, after being bailed out by his sister-in-law, walks in on Steyne forcing himself upon Becky. He throws him out but realizes Becky has been taking money for months in secret without sharing it with him. He leaves her, entrusting the care of their son to his older brother, the new Sir Pitt, and his wife.

Twelve years later, Becky is a card dealer at a casino in Baden-Baden, Germany. Rawdon died from malaria soon after leaving her, while posted to a tropical island by Lord Steyne. She comes across Amelia's grown son George Jr., who invites her to tea with his mother. Mr. Osborne finally accepted Amelia, leaving her and George Jr. with a large inheritance. Becky confronts Amelia over her obsession with the late George, showing her a love note from him many years earlier. She urges Amelia to love Dobbin, who has been loyal for many years. Although at first angered, Amelia realizes her mistake and declares her love to Dobbin.

Alone again in the casino, Becky meets Jos Sedley, who has come to Germany after Amelia tells him Becky was there. He invites her to live in India with him, and she delightedly accepts. They depart to make a new life for themselves.

== Cast ==
- Reese Witherspoon as Rebecca "Becky" Sharp Crawley
  - Angelica Mandy as young Becky Sharp
- Romola Garai as Amelia Sedley Osborne
- Sophie Hunter as Maria Osborne
- James Purefoy as Colonel Rawdon Crawley
- Jonathan Rhys Meyers as Captain George Henry Osborne
- Rhys Ifans as Major William Dobbin
- Eileen Atkins as Miss Matilda Crawley
- Geraldine McEwan as the Countess of Southdown
- Gabriel Byrne as the Marquess of Steyne
- Bob Hoskins as Sir Pitt Crawley the Elder
- Douglas Hodge as Sir Pitt Crawley the Younger
- Natasha Little as Lady Jane Sheepshanks Crawley
- John Woodvine as Lord Bareacres
- Barbara Leigh-Hunt as Lady Bareacres
- Nicholas Jones as Lord Darlington
- Siân Thomas as Lady Darlington
- Trevor Cooper as General Tufto
- Kelly Hunter as the Marchioness of Steyne
- Camilla Rutherford as Lady Gaunt
- Alexandra Staden as Lady George
- Jim Broadbent as Mr. Osborne
- Tony Maudsley as Joseph "Jos" Sedley
- John Franklyn-Robbins as Mr. John Sedley
- Deborah Findlay as Mrs. Mary Sedley
- Daniel Hay as little George "Georgy" Osborne the Younger
- Tom Sturridge as a young George "Georgy" Osborne the Younger
- Kathryn Drysdale as Rhoda Swartz
- Ruth Sheen as Miss Pinkerton
- Richard McCabe as King George IV
- Gledis Cinque as an older Celia Crawley
- William Melling as the young Rawdy Crawley
- Robert Pattinson as an older Sir Rawdon "Rawdy" Crawley the Younger (uncredited)

== Production ==
The film adaptation of Vanity Fair had been in development for over 10 years, with writers Matthew Faulk and Mark Skeet working on the screenplay. Mira Nair became attached to the project in 2002 and scrapped most of the initial screenplay. She brought Julian Fellowes in to rewrite the film; he agreed with her that the character of Becky Sharp should be made more sympathetic than in the novel. The ending was also changed, with Becky journeying to India with Joseph Sedley.

The film had a budget of $23 million and originally was supposed to be in pre-production for 18 weeks. However, Reese Witherspoon became pregnant so it was necessary to speed up both pre-production and filming. Vanity Fair was shot in Bath, Kent, the Chatham Dockyard, and at Stanway House in Gloucestershire.

Robert Pattinson initially had a small but important role as the grown-up son of Becky Sharp. He later revealed that he discovered his scenes were cut during the premiere screening.

== Soundtrack ==
Mira Nair, the director of the film, searched for good Indian musicians to compose a song for the album, and finally selected the trio Shankar–Ehsaan–Loy at the last minute. She showed them a rough footage of the situation she wanted them to compose for, which was the last few sequences of the film. The trio used tabla and several other Indian musical instruments for the song, without any synth, to give it an ethnic feel. The song was sung by Shankar Mahadevan, accompanied by Richa Sharma and Jerry McCulley of Celtic Instruments described the song as "a sprightly duet", while SoundtrackNet said the "aforementioned upbeat vocal number Gori Re" is enjoyable in its own way for one who enjoys Indian musical styles.

Track #	Song	Artist(s)	Music	Duration
1	"She Walks in Beauty"	Sissel Kyrkjebø	Mychael Danna	1:59
2	"Exchange"	Nicholas Dodd	Mychael Danna	2:10
3	"Becky and Amelia Leave School"	Nicholas Dodd	Mychael Danna	1:26
4	"The Great Adventurer"	Custer Larue	Mychael Danna	2:05
5	"Becky Arrives at the Queen's Crawley"	Nicholas Dodd	Mychael Danna	1:43
6	"Andante"	Nicholas Dodd	Mychael Danna	1:08
7	"No Lights after Eleven"	Nicholas Dodd	Mychael Danna	2:48
8	"Adagio"	Nicholas Dodd	Mychael Danna	1:35
9	"I've Made up My Mind"	Nicholas Dodd	Mychael Danna	0:28
10	"Ride to London"	Nicholas Dodd	Mychael Danna	2:03
11	"Becky and Rawdon Kiss"	Nicholas Dodd	Mychael Danna	2:00
12	"Sir Pitt's Marriage Proposal"	Nicholas Dodd	Mychael Danna	1:38
13	"I Owe You Nothing"	Nicholas Dodd	Mychael Danna	1:14
14	"Piano for Amelia/Announcement of Battle"	Nicholas Dodd	Mychael Danna	3:11
15	"Time to Quit Brussels"	Nicholas Dodd	Mychael Danna	2:37
16	"Waterloo Battlefield"	Nicholas Dodd	Mychael Danna	1:28
17	"Amelia Refuses Dobbin/The Move to Mayfair"	Nicholas Dodd	Mychael Danna	2:03
18	"Now Sleeps the Crimson Petal"	Custer Larue	Mychael Danna	2:45
19	"Steyne the Pasha"	Nicholas Dodd	Mychael Danna	1:11
20	"El Salaam"	Hakim	Mychael Danna	1:33
21	"The Virtue Betrayed"	Nicholas Dodd	Mychael Danna	0:38
22	"Rawdon's End"	Nicholas Dodd	Mychael Danna	0:46
23	"Dobbin Leaves Amelia"	Nicholas Dodd	Mychael Danna	1:06
24	"Vanity's Conqueror"	Nicholas Dodd	Mychael Danna	1:13
25	"Gori Re (O Fair One)"	Richa Sharma, Shankar Mahadevan	Shankar–Ehsaan–Loy	4:26

== Reception ==
On review aggregator website Rotten Tomatoes, the film holds an approval rating of 50% based on 164 reviews, and an average rating of 6.3/10. The website's critical consensus reads, "A more likable Becky Sharp makes for a less interesting movie." On Metacritic, the film has a weighted average score of 53 out of 100, based on 41 critics, indicating "mixed or average" reviews.

Stephen Hunter of The Washington Post gave a positive review, calling the movie "Mira Nair's fine movie version of the 1848 book, in all its glory and scope and wit." In the Charlotte Observer, Lawrence Toppman commented that "The filmmakers have wisely retained the main structure of the book" and that "The cast is uniformly good, even when dealing with sudden mood changes forced by the screenwriters' need to move forward."

Meanwhile, Lisa Schwarzbaum, in her review in Entertainment Weekly, rated the film a B−, and added that "The dismaying switcheroo in director Mira Nair's adaptation [...] that Botoxes Thackeray’s riotous, unruly masterpiece, is that this 'Vanity Fair' is, indeed, genteel and inoffensive. In fact, it borders on perky – a duller, safer tonal choice for the story of a conniving go-getter whose fall is as precipitous as her rise."

== Accolades ==
Year	Award	Category	Recipient	Result
2004	Venice Film Festival	Golden Lion	Mira Nair	Nominated
2005	Satellite Awards	Best Art Direction and Production Design	Maria Djurkovic and Tatiana Macdonald	Nominated
2005	Satellite Awards	Best Costume Design	Beatrix Aruna Pasztor	Won
2005	London Film Critics Circle Awards	British Supporting Actress of the Year	Eileen Atkins	Nominated
