= Best Friends (2014 film) =

- Theatrical release poster
- A Woman as a Friend
- Directed by: Giovanni Veronesi
- Written by: Giovanni Veronesi; Ugo Chiti
- Produced by: Domenico Procacci
- Starring: Fabio De Luigi; Laetitia Casta; Monica Scattini; Geppi Cucciari; Virginia Raffaele; Valeria Solarino; Valentina Lodovini; Adriano Giannini
- Cinematography: Arnaldo Catinari
- Edited by: Giogiò Franchini
- Music by: Andrea Guerra
- Production companies: Fandango; Warner Bros. Entertainment Italia
- Distributed by: Warner Bros. Pictures
- Release date: 27 February 2014
- Running time: 88 minutes
- Country: Italy
- Language: Italian

Best Friends or A Woman as a Friend (Italian: Una donna per amica) is a 2014 romantic comedy film written and directed by Giovanni Veronesi and starring Fabio De Luigi and Laetitia Casta.

== Plot ==
Francesco De Biase, a lawyer, and Claudia Casamacchia, a veterinarian of French origins, are very close friends.

One day Giovanni bursts into her life and marries her in a short time . However, her husband turns out to be violent and Claudia takes refuge at Francesco's house, who in the meantime is engaged to Lia, a colleague of hers and is about to move in together.

Francesco soon realizes that friendship between a man and a woman is more difficult than expected and begins to lie to Lia about the friendship between him and Claudia. In a short time, after Claudia has abandoned her husband, in a moment of inebriation she lets Francesco kiss her. Repentant, she then allows herself a night of sex with Luca, a former schoolmate. Francesco, who by chance sees her leaving the house dressed up, follows her and spies on her and, after seeing her squalid show, understands that the time has come to cut ties with Claudia for good.

Some time later, Francesco's secretary announces the arrival of a girl who is posing as his new secretary: it is Anna, Claudia's sister, who came out of a rehabilitation center for drug addicts, to whom the lawyer had promised a job in his studio. Anna hands him a postcard from Claudia, who has returned to live in Paris with her mother, but Francesco doesn't want to know anything about it anymore. He gives the girl his last money and follows her advice to go eat an ice cream at the seaside, where he meets Giulia.

Seven years later, Francesco is sleeping on an armchair in an airport waiting room, when Claudia appears and, seeing him sleeping, jokingly begins to disturb him, blowing on his face. At that point, a little girl arrives, Francesco's daughter, who immediately turns out to be wary of Claudia. The little girl wakes up her father while his ex-friend runs to hide, and in the meantime her mother, Giulia, arrives with another baby in her pouch, who calls him because they are late for the plane.

== Cast ==
- Fabio De Luigi as Francesco
- Laetitia Casta as Claudia
- Valentina Lodovini as Lia
- Valeria Solarino as Anna
- Adriano Giannini as Giovanni
- Monica Scattini as Elga
- Geppi Cucciari as Cecilia
- Virginia Raffaele as Patrizia
- Antonia Liskova as Antonia
- Flavio Montrucchio as Luca

== See also ==
- List of Italian films of 2014
