= Love Is in the Air (2012 film) =

2012 Italian comedy film

- Film poster
- Italian: Com'è bello far l'amore
- Directed by: Fausto Brizzi
- Written by: Andrea Agnello; Fausto Brizzi; Marco Martani
- Produced by: Fausto Brizzi; Mario Gianani; Lorenzo Mieli
- Starring: Fabio De Luigi; Claudia Gerini; Filippo Timi; Giorgia Würth
- Cinematography: Marcello Montarsi
- Edited by: Luciana Pandolfelli
- Music by: Bruno Zambrini
- Distributed by: Medusa Film
- Release date: 10 February 2012 (Italy)
- Running time: 97 minutes
- Country: Italy
- Language: Italian

Love Is in the Air (Italian: Com'è bello far l'amore, lit. 'How beautiful it is to make love') is a 2012 Italian comedy film directed by Fausto Brizzi.

== Cast ==
- Fabio De Luigi as Andrea
- Claudia Gerini as Giulia
- Filippo Timi as Max Lamberti
- Giorgia Würth as Vanessa
- Alessandro Sperduti as Simone
- Virginia Raffaele as Juanita
- Michele Foresta as Claudio
- Michela Andreozzi as Daniela
- Eleonora Bolla as Alice
- Gledis Cinque as Martina
- Yohana Allen as Jody
- Alexandre Vella as Louis Lumière
- Margherita Buy as Luigia
- Pasquale Petrolo as the pharmacist
- Enzo Salvi as Enzo
- Franco Trentalance as himself
