= When Mom Is Away =

2019 Italian comedy film

- Film poster
- Italian: 10 giorni senza mamma
- Directed by: Alessandro Genovesi
- Written by: Alessandro Genovesi; Giovanni Bognetti
- Based on: Ten Days Without Mom
- Starring: Fabio De Luigi; Valentina Lodovini
- Cinematography: Federico Masiero
- Music by: Andrea Farri
- Distributed by: Medusa Film
- Release date: 7 February 2019
- Running time: 90 minutes
- Country: Italy
- Language: Italian

When Mom Is Away (Italian: 10 giorni senza mamma, lit. '10 days without mom') is a 2019 Italian comedy film directed by Alessandro Genovesi.

A Christmas-themed sequel entitled When Mom Is Away... With the Family was released in December 2020.

== Cast ==
- Fabio De Luigi as Carlo
- Valentina Lodovini as Giulia
- Angelica Elli as Camilla
- Matteo Castellucci as Tito
- Bianca Usai as Bianca
- Diana Del Bufalo as Lucia
- Niccolò Senni as Alessandro Minervini
- Antonio Catania as the boss
- Giorgia Cardaci as Adele
