= When Mom Is Away... With the Family =

2020 Italian comedy film

- Italian: 10 giorni con Babbo Natale
- Directed by: Alessandro Genovesi
- Written by: Alessandro Genovesi
- Starring: Fabio De Luigi; Valentina Lodovini; Diego Abatantuono
- Cinematography: Federico Masiero
- Edited by: Claudio Di Mauro
- Music by: Andrea Farri
- Distributed by: Medusa Film; Amazon Prime Video
- Release date: 4 December 2020
- Running time: 100 minutes
- Country: Italy
- Language: Italian

When Mom Is Away... With the Family (Italian: 10 giorni con Babbo Natale, lit. 'Ten days with Santa Claus') is a 2020 Italian Christmas comedy film directed by Alessandro Genovesi.

The film is a sequel to 2019 film When Mom Is Away and was followed by When Mom Is Away... With the In-laws.

== Cast ==
- Fabio De Luigi as Carlo
- Valentina Lodovini as Giulia
- Diego Abatantuono as Santa Claus
- Angelica Elli as Camilla
- Matteo Castellucci as Tito
- Bianca Usai as Bianca
- Nana Funabiki as Merlin
- Balkissa Maiga as Rosa
- Chiara Pazzaglia as Dr. Fracassi
- Melissa Anna Bartolini as Lucia
- Matteo Pagani as Luca
- Beatrice Barichella as Luca's girlfriend
- Niccolò Tredese as Matteo
- Martina Galletta as Arianna
- Amelie Ikuzwe Fasolini as Alice
- Anna Dalton as Teresa
- Alessandro Genovesi as the Elf

== Release ==
Originally set to be theatrically released on 16 December 2020, the film premiered on 4 December 2020 on Amazon Prime Video due to the second outbreak of the COVID-19 pandemic in Italy.

== See also ==
- List of Christmas films
- Santa Claus in film
