= The Tearsmith =

2024 Italian film by Alessandro Genovesi

- Italian Netflix poster
- Italian: Fabbricante di lacrime
- Directed by: Alessandro Genovesi
- Written by: Eleonora Fiorini; Alessandro Genovesi
- Based on: The Tearsmith by Erin Doom
- Produced by: Alessandro Usai; Iginio Straffi
- Starring: Simone Baldasseroni; Caterina Ferioli; Sabrina Paravicini; Alessandro Bedetti; Roberta Rovelli; Orlando Cinque; Eco Andriolo; Nicky Passarella; Sveva Romana Candelletta
- Cinematography: Luca Esposito
- Edited by: Claudio Di Mauro; Simone Rosati
- Music by: Andrea Farri
- Production company: Colorado Film
- Distributed by: Netflix
- Release date: 4 April 2024
- Running time: 105 minutes
- Country: Italy
- Language: Italian

The Tearsmith (Italian: Fabbricante di lacrime) is a 2024 Italian teen romance film directed by Alessandro Genovesi, based on the novel of the same name by Erin Doom. It was released on Netflix on 4 April 2024.

== Plot ==
Eight-year-old Nica is left orphaned when her parents die in a car accident. She is taken to the oppressive Sunnycreek Orphanage, where she befriends a girl named Adeline. Years later, Nica, now a teenager, is adopted by Anna and Norman Milligan. The couple also adopts Rigel, a moody teenager who is the pride and joy of the headmistress, Margaret. At their new home, Rigel is hostile toward Nica. Flashbacks reveal that at Sunnycreek, all of the children except Rigel were physically and emotionally abused by Margaret.

On their first day of school, Rigel gets into a fight with another student. The students participate in Garden Day, whereby they give roses anonymously to each other. Nica receives a black rose, signifying a tormented and obsessive love, and Rigel denies giving it to her.

A student named Lionel asks Nica out on a date, and Rigel later gets into a fistfight with him. Nica admonishes Rigel for his behavior and he has a seizure, leaving her to care for him. They share a romantic moment. A flashback to Sunnycreek reveals that on one occasion, when Nica was about to be punished by Margaret, Rigel cut his own hand to distract her.

Adeline visits the Milligan home and tells Nica that she wants to press charges against Margaret, and needs Nica's testimony. Nica declines, unable to face her own past. That night, Nica and Rigel are about to kiss when Lionel knocks at the door. Lionel suspects that Nica and Rigel have feelings for one another, and tells her that people would not approve of their relationship. Rigel tells Nica that he is too broken for her and she deserves a normal boyfriend. He also tells Anna that he is rejecting their adoption and leaves the home.

During the school dance, Lionel attempts to sexually assault Nica in a classroom, but Rigel intervenes. Nica and Rigel kiss and have sex in the classroom. After leaving the dance, a furious Lionel tries to run them over with his car on a bridge, but they escape by jumping off into the river below.

Nica wakes up in the hospital; Rigel's body broke her fall and he is in a coma, further complicated by the brain neuromas he suffers from. He is now under custody of Margaret, having rejected the Milligans' adoption. Margaret blames Nica for his coma and says that she will keep her away from him forever. Nica, now defiant, finally agrees to testify against her.

Afterward, Nica tells Rigel in the hospital that they won the case and Margaret will never be able to hurt them again. Rigel finally wakes up from the coma. In the future, Nica and Rigel are happily married and have a daughter.

== Cast ==
- Simone Baldasseroni as Rigel Wilde
- Caterina Ferioli as Nica Dover
- Sabrina Paravicini as Margaret Stoker, the headmistress of Sunnycreek Orphanage
- Alessandro Bedetti as Lionel, Nica's admirer
- Roberta Rovelli as Anna Milligan, Rigel and Nica's adoptive mother
- Orlando Cinque as Norman Milligan, Rigel and Nica's adoptive father
- Eco Andriolo as Adeline, Nica's childhood friend
- Nicky Passarella as Billie, Nica's friend
- Sveva Romana Candelletta as Miki, Nica's friend
- Juju Di Domenico as Asia
- Stefano Massari as Peter Corrin
- Laura Baldi as Dalma
- Eugenio Krauss as Dalma's husband
- Antonio Ghisleri as Phelps
- Aron Tewelde as Mr. Kirill

== Production ==
The Tearsmith was published by Magazzini Salani in 2021 and became the best-selling novel of 2022 in Italy. Following its success, Colorado Film acquired the rights to a film adaptation in mid-2022. Filming took place in Rome, Pescara, and Ravenna from February to June 2023.

=== Music ===
Songs featured in the film include "Budapest" by George Ezra, "Vampire" by Olivia Rodrigo, and "I Love You" by Billie Eilish.

== Release ==
Netflix acquired distribution rights to the film in September 2023. A teaser trailer for the film was released on 20 February 2024, and the official trailer was released on 14 March 2024.

== Reception ==
Aurora Amidon of Paste called the film "predictable", but "entertaining in its own wild and unexpected ways". She praised the performances of Ferioli and Baldasseroni as well as the film's production design. Johnny Loftus of Decider wrote, "Chemistry-wise, Caterina Ferioli and Simone Baldasseroni have their moments, as far as frustrated lovers trying to find their purpose together certainly can. It is quite possible to root for them. But the setting as it's portrayed in the film took us way, way out of the immediate story, and especially impedes the romance."

Livia Paccarié of The Hollywood Reporter Roma called the film "a confusing mix of clichés halfway between Oliver Twist and Twilight". Marianna Ciarlante of Today echoed these sentiments, calling the film a "disappointment" and "a strange mix of clichés, toxic love, and platitudes". Lorenza Negri of Wired Italia called the film "objectively bad" and "mostly ridiculous", but commended the subject material's message of kindness "towards the anesthetized, insensitive and disinterested generations who fall within the target of [Doom's] work." Simona Tavola of Cinefilos.it rated the film two-and-a-half out of five stars, calling it a film "designed only for Gen Z audiences", but "an above-average package [...] of the young adult genre".

On 7 April 2024, after three days of its release, the film ranked first on the Netflix global charts.
