= Andrea Farri =

Italian composer

- Born: 11 February 1982 (age 44); Rome, Italy
- Occupation: Composer
- Website: https://www.andreafarri.it/

Andrea Farri (born 11 February 1982) is an Italian film composer.

== Life and career ==
Born in Rome, Farri is the son of actress Lucia Poli and the nephew of actor Paolo Poli. An autodidact, he started composing incidental music at 17 years old. He made his film score debut in 2008, with Matteo Rovere's A Game for Girls.

In 2015, Farri won the Globo d'oro for best score for Latin Lover. In 2023, he won the "Soundtrack Stars Award" during the 2023 Venice Film Festival for Matteo Garrone's Io capitano. In 2024 he scores the music to Those About to Die directed by Roland Emmerich and Marco Kreuzpaintner. In 2026 he was appointed as music director and composer for the 2026 Winter Olympics' opening ceremony.

== Partial filmography ==
=== Films ===
- Fabricants di larmes de Alessandro Genovesi (2024)
- A Game for Girls, directed by Matteo Rovere (2008)
- Drifters, directed by Matteo Rovere (2011)
- When the Night, directed by Cristina Comencini (2011)
- 10 Rules for Falling in Love, directed by Cristiano Bortone (2012)
- Fuga di cervelli, directed by Paolo Ruffini (2013)
- I Can Quit Whenever I Want, directed by Sydney Sibilia (2014)
- Soap Opera, directed by Alessandro Genovesi (2014)
- Belli di papà , directed by Guido Chiesa (2015)
- I Killed Napoléon, directed by Giorgia Farina (2015)
- Latin Lover, directed by Cristina Comencini (2015)
- What a Beautiful Surprise, directed by Alessandro Genovesi (2015)
- Qualcosa di nuovo, directed by Cristina Comencini (2016)
- Pagliacci, directed by Marco Bellocchio (2016)
- The Big Score, directed by Carlo Verdone (2016)
- Italian Race, directed by Matteo Rovere (2016)
- Moglie e marito, directed by Simone Godano (2017)
- My Big Gay Italian Wedding, directed by Alessandro Genovesi (2018)
- The Legend of the Christmas Witch, directed by Michele Soavi (2018)
- The First King: Birth of an Empire, directed by Matteo Rovere (2019)
- An Almost Ordinary Summer, directed by Simone Godano (2019)
- Sono solo fantasmi, directed by Christian De Sica (2019)
- 18 Presents, directed by Francesco Amato (2020)
- When Mom Is Away... With the Family, directed by Alessandro Genovesi (2020)
- Yara, directed by Marco Tullio Giordana (2021)
- 7 Women and a Murder, directed by Alessandro Genovesi (2021)
- Security, directed by Peter Chelsom (2021)
- Don't Kill Me, directed by Andrea De Sica (2021)
- Noi, directed by Luca Ribuoli (2022)
- Marilyn's Eyes, directed by Simone Godano (2022)
- The Hanging Sun, directed by Francesco Carrozzini (2022)
- Io capitano, directed by Matteo Garrone (2023)
- The Tearsmith, directed by Alessandro Genovesi (2024)
- When Mom Is Away... With the In-laws, directed by Alessandro Genovesi (2024)

=== TV Series ===
- Imma Tataranni: Deputy Prosecutor (2019–2023)
- Romulus II - La guerra per Roma (2022)
- Il Patriarca, directed by Claudio Amendola (2023)
- Un professore (second season), directed by Alessandro Casale
