= 2014 in Italy =

- Decades: 1990s; 2000s; 2010s; 2020s; 2030s
- See also: History of Italy; Timeline of Italian history; List of years in Italy

Events in the year 2014 in Italy.

== Incumbents ==
- President: Giorgio Napolitano
- Prime Minister: Enrico Letta (until 22 February), Matteo Renzi (starting 22 February)

== Events ==
=== January ===
- 15 January – Italy says that it will use the Italian Army against the mafia who are accused of dumping toxic waste in Naples.
- 25 January – A vial containing drops of late Pope John Paul II's blood is stolen from the Church of San Pietro della Ienca in Abruzzo.

=== February ===
- 14 February – Italian Prime Minister Enrico Letta resigns after pressure from his own Democratic Party to step down.

=== April ===
- 12 April – An anti-austerity protest in Rome turns violent: people being injured in clashes between angry protesters and riot police number at least one (according to AP)

=== June ===
- 1 June – The 2014 Italian motorcycle Grand Prix is held at the Mugello Circuit in Scarperia, and is won by Marc Márquez.

=== September ===
- 7 September – The 2014 Italian Grand Prix is held at the Autodromo Nazionale Monza, and is won by Lewis Hamilton.

=== October ===
- 31 October – Italian Interior Minister Angelino Alfano announced the end of Operation Mare Nostrum.

=== November ===
- 15 November – Singer Vincenzo Cantiello wins Junior Eurovision Song Contest 2014 for Italy. He was also Italy's debut entrant in the competition, marking the first time since the inaugural contest that a country won in its debut year.
- 29 November – The murder of Lorys Stival in Sicily.

=== December ===
- 12 December – general strike

== Deaths ==
- January 11 – Arnoldo Foà, 97, actor
- January 20 – Claudio Abbado, 80, conductor
- January 22 – Carlo Mazzacurati, 57, director
- January 31 – Giorgio Stracquadanio, 54, politician
- April 6 – Massimo Tamburini, 70, motorcycle designer
- April 13 – Emma Castelnuovo, 100, teacher
- July 4 – Giorgio Faletti, 63, actor
- July 25 - Carlo Bergonzi, 90, operatic tenor
- September 4 – Franca Falcucci, 88, politician
- September 8 – Magda Olivero, 104, operatic soprano
- September 21 – Francesco Fornabaio, 57, aviator
- October 11 - Anita Cerquetti, 83, operatic soprano
- December 8 – Mango, 60, singer
- December 18 – Virna Lisi, 78, actress

== See also ==
- 2014 in Italian television
- List of Italian films of 2014
