= What a Beautiful Surprise =

- Directed by: Alessandro Genovesi
- Screenplay by: Alessandro Genovesi; Giovanni Bognetti; Claudio Torres
- Story by: Luca Miniero; Riccardo Milani; Alessandro Genovesi
- Based on: The Invisible Woman by Cláudio Torres
- Produced by: Maurizio Totti; Alessandro Usai
- Starring: Claudio Bisio; Frank Matano; Valentina Lodovini; Chiara Baschetti; Ornella Vanoni; Renato Pozzetto
- Cinematography: Federico Masiero
- Music by: Andrea Farri
- Release date: March 11, 2015
- Running time: 91 minutes
- Language: Italian

What a Beautiful Surprise (Italian: Ma che bella sorpresa) is a 2015 Italian comedy film written and directed by Alessandro Genovesi and starring Claudio Bisio. It grossed $5,626,528 at the Italian box office.

== Plot ==
Guido, a Milanese who has relocated to Naples, is a somewhat romantic teacher of Italian literature. When his wife leaves him for a young Belgian, Guido becomes depressed and it seems his life has gone to pieces. Not even the support of his parents Giovanni and Carla and his friend Paolo, a physical education teacher, can lift his morale. Everything changes when Guido meets his new neighbor, an extremely attractive young woman named Silvia. Guido immediately falls wildly in love with her, as she embodies all the qualities he wants in a woman. Happily, she falls in love with him as well, and for a time everything seems perfect for him.

Meanwhile, Giada, another neighbor who recently lost her husband, is madly in love with Guido but contents herself with eavesdropping on him through the wall that separates their apartments, rather than approaching him.

When Guido's parents visit him, things start to fall apart. Eventually we learn the cause of the many misunderstandings; it turns out that all the while Silvia has just been a figment of Guido's imagination.

== Cast ==
- Claudio Bisio as Guido
- Frank Matano as Paolo
- Valentina Lodovini as Giada
- Renato Pozzetto as Giovanni
- Ornella Vanoni as Carla
- Chiara Baschetti as Silvia
- Galatea Ranzi as The Psychiatrist
- Anna Ammirati as Anna

== See also ==
- List of Italian films of 2015
