= 7 Women and a Murder =

2021 film by Alessandro Genovesi

- Theatrical release poster
- Italian: 7 donne e un mistero
- Directed by: Alessandro Genovesi
- Screenplay by: Alessandro Genovesi; Lisa Nur Sultan
- Based on: 8 Women by François Ozon
- Produced by: Mario Gianani; Lorenzo Gangarossa
- Starring: Margherita Buy; Diana Del Bufalo; Sabrina Impacciatore; Benedetta Porcaroli; Micaela Ramazzotti; Luisa Ranieri; Ornella Vanoni
- Cinematography: Federico Masiero
- Edited by: Claudio Di Mauro
- Music by: Andrea Farri
- Production companies: Wildside; Warner Bros. Entertainment Italia
- Distributed by: Warner Bros. Pictures
- Release date: 25 December 2021
- Running time: 83 minutes
- Country: Italy
- Language: Italian
- Box office: €1.1 million (Italy)

7 Women and a Murder (Italian: 7 donne e un mistero, lit. '7 Women and a Mystery') is a 2021 Italian comedy mystery film co-written and directed by Alessandro Genovesi, serving as a remake of the 2002 film 8 Women by François Ozon, itself based on the play Huit femmes by Robert Thomas. It stars Margherita Buy, Diana Del Bufalo, Sabrina Impacciatore, Benedetta Porcaroli, Micaela Ramazzotti, Luisa Ranieri and Ornella Vanoni.

The film was released in Italy on 25 December 2021 by Warner Bros. Pictures, grossing €1,118,038. It was made available on Netflix internationally on 28 December 2022.

== Plot ==
Near the Christmas holidays, a daughter, Susanna, arrives home from Milan, having caught an earlier train than the previously planned train at noon. Also living in the house are a maid (Maria), the mother of the family (Margherita), the younger daughter (Caterina), the grandmother (Rachele), and the mother's sister (Agostina). Maria is sent to see if the father (Marcello) wants breakfast and finds him stabbed in the back. Realizing it must have happened overnight, the women try to find out who killed him. They find that the phone lines are cut, and the car engine was tampered with, so they must solve the mystery on their own.

Over the course of the investigation, many secrets are revealed, and the seventh woman (Veronica), a neighbor and previous lover of the father, shows up after receiving a mysterious phone call informing her the father has died. Once she confirms it is true, she turns to leave but finds that the blizzard is too severe to walk back home and she must stay in the house.

Rachele reveals that Susanna, who returned home early to tell Marcello she was pregnant, is from another father, Margherita's deceased boyfriend, Umberto. To prevent her from sharing more details, Margherita hits Rachele over the head, which knocks her unconscious. They hide her in the storeroom.

Eventually, they try to scale the gate, but shouting from inside the house draws the group back in, and they find Margherita and Veronica kissing after getting into a violent fight, with blood on their faces.

When returning from the gate, Maria figures out what happened, but says that she is not the one who should tell the story. Then, Caterina reveals that it was all a plot between her and Marcello to determine, after his death, who would cry from love and whose only concern would be money. They all rush to his bedroom, see him, but find that what he overheard in the chaos after his faked death drove him to jump off the terrace in his room. Finding that he is truly dead, they call the police inspector and report that he committed suicide due to financial trouble.

The women all decided to stick together and take care of each other in the big house with Marcellos's inheritance and Rachele's precious stocks.

== Cast ==
- Margherita Buy as Margherita Caccia, wife of Marcello
- Ornella Vanoni as Rachele, mother-in-law of Marcello
- Micaela Ramazzotti as Veronica, former lover of Marcello
- Sabrina Impacciatore as Agostina, sister-in-law of Marcello
- Luisa Ranieri as Maria, the Caccias' maid
- Diana Del Bufalo as Susanna Caccia, Margherita's daughter with her deceased lover, Umberto
- Benedetta Porcaroli as Caterina Caccia, daughter of Marcello and Margherita
- Marco Rossetti as Inspector Giovanni Ripoldi
- Alessandro Genovesi as taxi driver
- Luca Pastorelli as Marcello Caccia
