= Valentina Lodovini =

Italian film and television actress (born 1978)

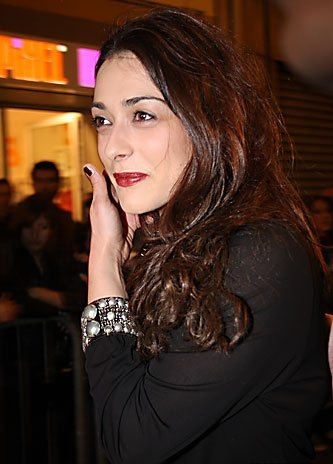
- Lodovini in 2008
- Born: 14 May 1978 (age 48); Umbertide, Perugia, Italy
- Occupation: Actress
- Years active: 2004–present

Valentina Lodovini (born 14 May 1978) is an Italian film and television actress.

== Life and career ==
Born in Umbertide, Italy, Lodovini grew up in Sansepolcro and attended the School of Dramatic Arts in Perugia, then moved in Rome to continue her studies at the Centro Sperimentale di Cinematografia. After some secondary roles, Lodovini emerged in 2007 with Carlo Mazzacurati's drama film La giusta distanza, for which she was nominated for David di Donatello for Best Actress.

In 2011 Lodovini won the David di Donatello for Best Supporting Actress for the role of Maria in Benvenuti al Sud. She reprised the role in the film sequel Benvenuti al Nord.

== Filmography ==
=== Films ===
Year	Title	Role(s)	Notes
2004	Ovunque sei	Francesca	
2005	Il mistero di Lovecraft - Road to L.	Valentina	
2006	Our Country	Gerry's wife	
2006	The Family Friend	Woman	Cameo appearance
2007	The Right Distance	Mara	
2007	Pornorama	Gina Ferrari	
2008	The Past Is a Foreign Land	Antonio	
2008	Good Morning Heartache	Michela	
2009	Fort Apache Napoli	Daniela	
2009	Generation 1000 Euros	Beatrice	
2009	Corporate	Vera	Short film
2010	Benvenuti al Sud	Maria Flagello	
2010	The Woman of My Dreams	Sara	
2011	Things from Another World	Laura Golfetto	
2012	Benvenuti al Nord	Maria Flagello	
2013	A Liberal Passion	Giovanna "Nina" Nardoni	
2013	South Is Nothing	Bianca	
2014	A Woman as a Friend	Lea	
2014	Good for Nothing	Cinzia	
2014	Tre tocchi	Dream woman #1	Cameo appearance
2014	The Games Maker	Mrs. Drago	
2014	Milionari	Rosaria	
2015	What a Beautiful Surprise	Giada	
2015	La linea gialla	Angela	
2016	La verità sta in cielo	Raffaella Notariale	
2017	Si muore tutti democristiani	Sara	
2017	Coco	Mamá Luisa Rivera (voice)	Italian dub; voice role
2018	Cosa fai a Capodanno?	Marina	
2019	When Mom Is Away	Giulia	
2020	È per il tuo bene	Paola	
2020	When Mom Is Away... With the Family	Giulia	
2021	L'afide e la formica	Anna	
2022	Love & Gelato	Francesca	
2022	Vicini di casa	Laura	
2023	The Best Days	Sonia	
2025	When Mom Is Away... With the In-laws	Giulia	

=== Television ===
Year	Title	Role(s)	Notes
2006	La moglie cinese	Eleonora	Television movie
2006	48 ore	Benny Miulli	Main role
2008	Coco Chanel	Adrienne	Television movie
2009	L'ispettore Coliandro	Francesca	Episode: "Mai rubare a casa dei ladri"
2010	Gli ultimi del paradiso	Gabriella	Miniseries
2010	Boris	Jasmine	2 episodes
2011	Il segreto dell'acqua	Daniela Gemma	Main role
2012	Un Natale con i fiocchi	Barbara	Television movie
2016	Untraditional	Herself	Episode: "Ultimo tango vegano"
2017	Inspector Montalbano	Giovanna Pusateri	Episode: "Un covo di vipere"
2019	L'Aquila	Elena Fiumani	Main role
