= The Worst Week of My Life (film) =

2011 film

- Film poster
- Directed by: Alessandro Genovesi
- Written by: Fabio De Luigi; Alessandro Genovesi
- Produced by: Maurizio Totti
- Starring: Fabio De Luigi; Cristiana Capotondi; Monica Guerritore; Antonio Catania; Chiara Francini; Gisella Sofio; Alessandro Siani
- Cinematography: Federico Masiero
- Edited by: Claudio Di Mauro
- Music by: Pivio and Aldo De Scalzi
- Distributed by: Warner Bros. Pictures
- Release date: 28 October 2011
- Running time: 93 minutes
- Country: Italy
- Language: Italian
- Box office: $16.5 million

The Worst Week of My Life (Italian: La peggior settimana della mia vita) is a 2011 Italian comedy film directed by Alessandro Genovesi, based on the British sitcom of the same name.

== Plot ==
Paolo is an advertising agent of Milan who is madly in love with the rich Margherita, of a wealthy family. The two decide to get married, and a week before the wedding, Paolo is invited by the parents and relatives of Margherita. They just want to know Paolo, as Margherita has spoken so highly of him; Paolo, however, proves to be very clumsy and awkward, resulting in catastrophic and extremely embarrassing situations. The troubles in the family also increases when Ivano, the best man of Paolo, comes at the parental home of Margherita.

== Cast ==
- Fabio De Luigi as Paolo
- Cristiana Capotondi as Margherita
- Monica Guerritore as Clara
- Antonio Catania as Giorgio
- Alessandro Siani as Ivano
- Gisella Sofio as the grandmother
- Nadir Caselli as Ginevra
- Chiara Francini as Simona
- Andrea Mingardi as Dino, Paolo's father
- Arisa as Martina

== See also ==
- List of Italian films of 2011
