= LaC TV =

Television station in Calabria, Italy

- Country: Italy
- Broadcast area: Calabria

Programming
- Language: Italian
- Picture format: 4:3 SDTV

Ownership
- Owner: Gruppo Publiemme

History
- Launched: November 1987

Links
- Website: http://www.lactv.it/

Availability

Terrestrial
- Digital: LCN 19

LaC TV is an Italian regional television channel of Calabria based in the city of Vibo Valentia. It transmits a light entertainment program: movies, news and weather bulletins, film and sports on LCN 19.

The channel was founded in 1987 by Franco Iannuzzi in Vibo Valentia and its first name was Rete Kalabria. In 1992, the Company "retekalabria srl" was incorporated.

== History ==
=== Early years ===
The network was born under the name Rete Kalabria, founded by Franco Iannuzzi in November 1987 in Vibo Valentia, following the Tele 2000 experiment, operative from 1977 to 1983.

The origins of the station date back to a television experiment by Giovanni e Franco Iannuzzi, when, in 1983, “with a VHS player and an amplifying system which was innovative at the time", gave the go-ahead, in Rosarno (Reggio Calabria), to local station Canale 22, which was on air from 1983 to July 1987, airing content of a local character.

==== The founding of Rete Kalabria ====
In the spring of 1987, Franco Iannuzzi alongside Ivan Iannuzzi, son of brother Giovanni Iannuzzi, identified the city of Vibo Valentia, the only large inhabited center in the region Calabria not to have a television station, as an ideal outlet for the station to grow. The initial project envisaged the location of a satellite television studio of Canale 22 in Vibo Valentia, but the development of the nascent province of Vibo Valentia pushed the station to move permanently to Vibo Valentia.

The founders thus decided to end the Canale 22 experience in favor of the nascent Kalabria Network. In the months from July to September 1987 the acquisition of broadcasting equipment began, and by September 1987 the station was ready for launch. The actual birth of Rete Kalabria took place in November 1987.

=== 1987-2013 period ===
From 1987, Rete Kalabria aired regional and local news and entertainment programs. A part of its programming is produced in-house and others were acquired from national and international production houses.

In the 90s, the station was an affiliate of Amica 9 - Telestar, and in 1992, Rete Kalabria srl was formed.

Among its programs the most well-known were:

- Una canzone per te, presented by Marco Renzi
- Agora the political information program presented by Antonio Ricottilli
- Personaggi allo specchio, presented by Vincenzo Varone
- Prego, si accomodi talk-show presented by Francesco Prestia
- Krono sport sports segment presented by Michele La Rocca

The network broadcast daily editions of the news. Furthermore, every Sunday Il settimanale was broadcast, a column with the main news of the week broadcast with the help of an interpreter in LIS intended for the deaf community.

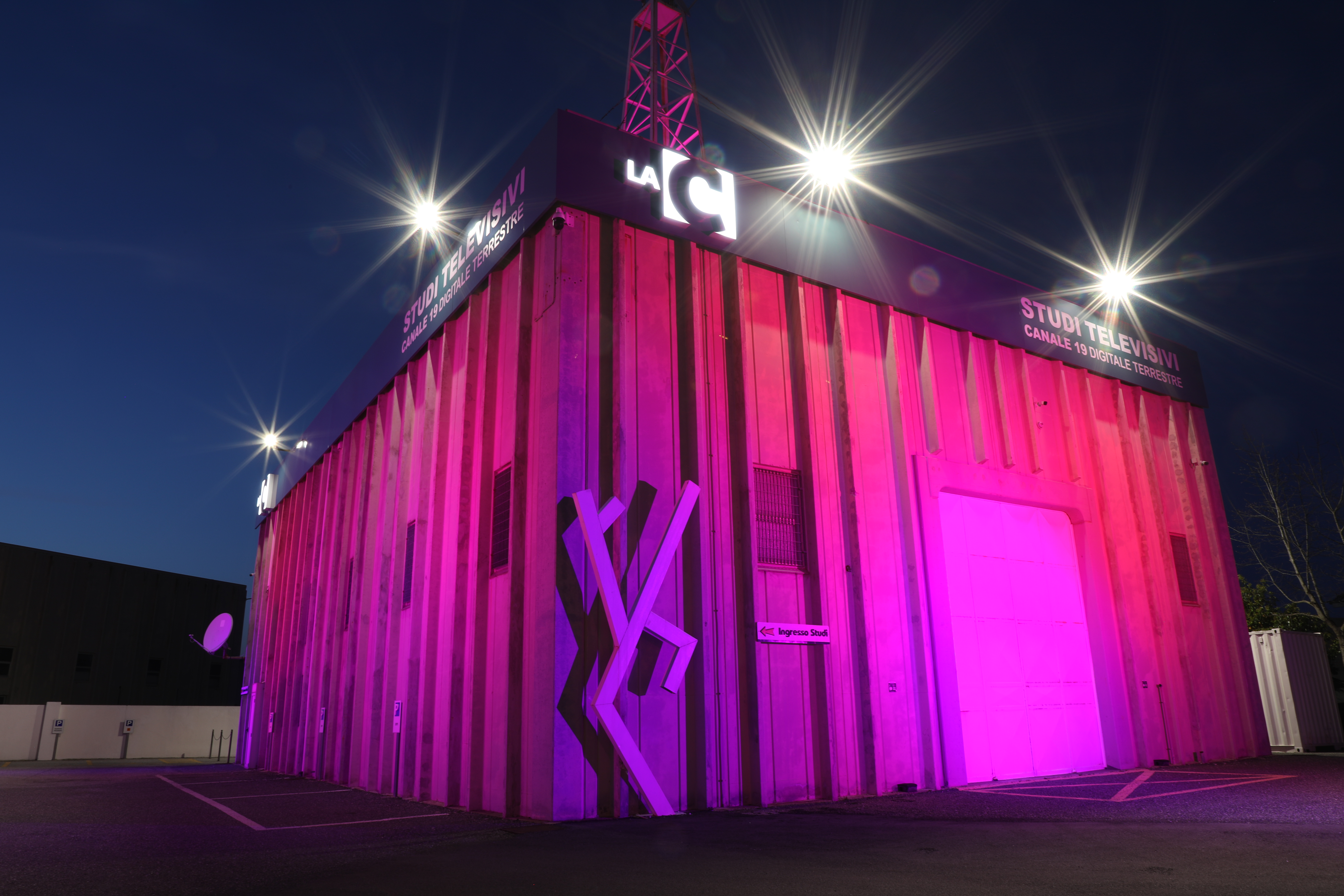
Outside of LaC TV's studios in Vibo Valentia

=== Since 2013 ===
In October 2013 the broadcaster was taken over by Publiemme Group, a company operating in the fields of advertising, publishing and communication led by Domenico Maduli.

Following a rebranding operation by the new ownership and by the will of the publisher Maduli, on October 20, 2014, Rete Kalabria changes its name to the current LaC. Alongside the rebrand, the station starts broadcasting in widescreen and, from November 15, 2014, also in HD. on channel 519, beconing the first regional television station in Calabria to broadcast in this standard. Still in 2014, the owner launches a web news portal, LaC News24.

From 22 May 2017 the broadcaster changed its name and from LaC, it took on its current name: LaC TV.

In January 2021, the network launches LaC Play, the station's on-demand service. The platform, initially available for smart TVs with HbbTV technology and later also as a website and app for mobile devices, allows viewers to review all the network's programs, restart programs on air with the Restart function and other interactive features, including the possibility of watching the LaC TV, LaC News 24 and LaC Sat channels (from February 2025 LaC Network) live. The latter channel began its broadcasts on 25 November 2021 on channel 419 of the Tivùsat platform and on channel 820 of Sky Italia, while from 29 November the logo and graphics changed.

On March 25, 2022 LaC Sat (from February 2025 LaC Network), moved from channel 419 to 411 of Tivùsat. On 26 April 2022, on the occasion of the change of frequencies that took place in the regional territory as part of the ministerial program for the transition to the new transmission standards, LaC TV moved to channel 11 of digital terrestrial which was joined from 14 February 2023 by another channel of the group, LaC On Air on channel 17.
