= Registe =

- Film poster
- Directed by: Diana Dell'Erba
- Written by: Diana Dell'Erba
- Produced by: Louis Nero
- Starring: Maria De Medeiros: Elvira Notari, Lina Wertmüller: herself, Cecilia Mangini: herself
- Cinematography: Diana Dell'Erba
- Edited by: Diana Dell'Erba
- Music by: Giulio Castagnoli
- Production company: L'Altrofilm
- Distributed by: L'Altrofilm
- Release date: 8 March 2014
- Running time: 76 minutes
- Country: Italy
- Language: Italian

Registe, also known as Women Directors, is a 2014 Italian documentary film written and directed by Diana Dell'Erba.

== Plot ==
Registe is an Italian documentary about the Italian Cinema signed by women and about the pioneer of the Silent Cinema Elvira Notari (1875-1946) played by Maria De Medeiros. The directors interviewed are the most important Italian women directors: Lina Wertmüller, Cecilia Mangini, Francesca Archibugi, Francesca Comencini, Wilma Labate, Cinzia Th Torrini, Roberta Torre, Antonietta De Lillo, Giada Colagrande, Donatella Maiorca, Ilaria Borrelli and other.

== Cast ==
- Maria De Medeiros: Elvira Notari
- Lina Wertmüller: herself
- Cecilia Mangini: herself
- Francesca Archibugi: herself
- Francesca Comencini: herself
- Cinzia Th Torrini: herself
- Roberta Torre: herself
- Giada Colagrande: herself
- Donatella Maiorca: herself
- Gian Luigi Rondi: himself
- Anselma Dell'Olio: herself
- Silvana Silvestri: herself
- Eliana Lo Castro Napoli: herself
- Eugenio Allegri: Vincenzo Caccavone
- Gian Maria Villani: Gennariello
- Marco Sabatino: Nicola Notari
- Rebecca Volpe: Goddess Lilith
- Ilaria Borrelli: herself
- Maria Sole Tognazzi: herself
- Antonietta De Lillo: herself
- Anne Riitta Ciccone: herself
- Alina Marazzi: herself
- Donatella Baglivo: herself
- Elisa Mereghetti: herself
- Anna Negri: herself
- Nina Di Majo: herself
- Paola Randi: herself
- Susanna Nicchiarelli: herself
- Stefania Bonatelli: herself
