= Soap Opera (2014 film) =

- Theatrical release poster
- Directed by: Alessandro Genovesi
- Written by: Alessandro Genovesi
- Starring: Fabio De Luigi; Cristiana Capotondi; Diego Abatantuono; Chiara Francini; Ricky Memphis; Ale & Franz; Elisa Sednaoui
- Cinematography: Federico Masiero
- Music by: Andrea Farri
- Distributed by: Medusa Film
- Release dates: 16 October 2014 (Rome Film Festival); 23 October 2014
- Running time: 86 minutes
- Country: Italy
- Language: Italian

Soap Opera is a 2014 Italian comedy film written and directed by Alessandro Genovesi. It opened the 2014 Rome Film Festival.

== Plot ==
In a small building in Milan, on the eve of New Year, all the neighbors are struggling with their stories. Francesco loves Anna, but their story is broken by Paolo, who claims to be gay and in love with Francesco. All of them are upset and bring the case to the police. Francesco and Anna manage to find love a few seconds before the new year.

== Cast ==
- Fabio De Luigi as Francesco
- Cristiana Capotondi as Anna
- Diego Abatantuono as Carabiniere Gaetano Cavallo
- Chiara Francini as Alice
- Ricky Memphis as Paolo
- Elisa Sednaoui as Francesca
- Franz as Mario
- Ale as Gianni
- Caterina Guzzanti as Patrizia
