= Dino Abbrescia =

Italian actor (born 1966)

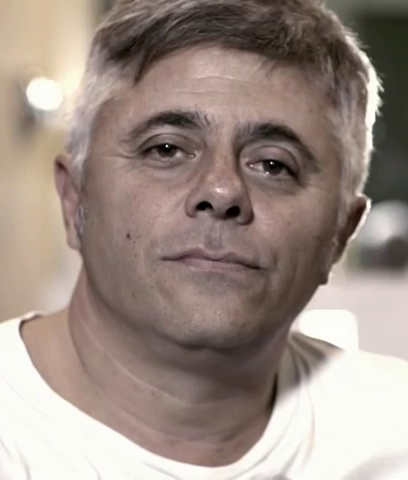
- Born: 18 August 1966 (age 60); Bari, Italy
- Occupation: Actor
- Years active: 1998-present

Dino Abbrescia (born Bernardo Abbrescia; 18 August 1966) is an Italian actor. He appeared in more than forty films since 1998.

== Selected filmography ==
Year	Title	Role	Notes
1999	LaCapaGira	Minuicchio	
2002	Soul Mate	Alessandro	
2003	I'm Not Scared	Pino Amitrano	
2005	Manual of Love	Gabriele	
2006	The Holy Family	Cleopha	
2007	Don't Think About It	Carlo	
2007	2061: An Exceptional Year	Tony	
2007	Cardiofitness	Nick	
2009	Cado dalle nubi	Alfredo	
2012	The Worst Christmas of My Life	Pino	
2015	Ever Been to the Moon?	Dino	
2015	Io che amo solo te	Modesto	
2019	Modalità aereo	Sabino Lorusso	
2019	Se mi vuoi bene	Luca	
2025	When Mom Is Away... With the In-laws	Lucio	
2026	Un tranquillo funerale di famiglia	Giovanni	
