= Fabio De Luigi =

Italian actor (born 1967)

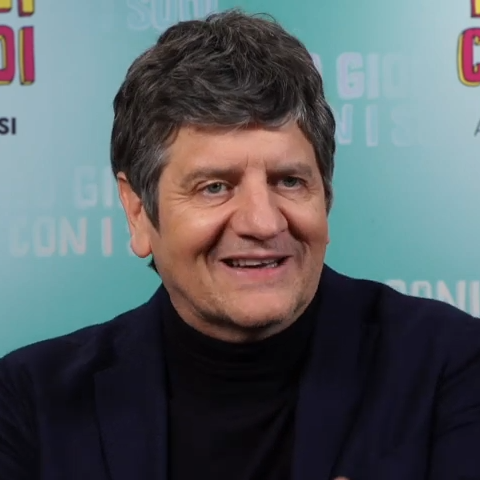
- Fabio De Luigi (2025)
- Born: 11 October 1967 (age 59); Santarcangelo di Romagna, Italy
- Occupations: Actor; comedian; film director; television presenter; basketball player
- Years active: 1994–1997 (basketball); 1996–present (acting)

Fabio De Luigi (born 11 October 1967) is an Italian actor, comedian, film director, television presenter, and former baseball player.

== Biography ==
Great-nephew of poet Tonino Guerra; has a son, Dino, born in 2007, and a daughter, Lola, born in 2011, had by his partner Jelena.

== Selected filmography ==
- Marriages (1998)
- All the Moron's Men (1999)
- Johnny the Partisan (2000)
- Commediasexi (2006)
- Natale a New York (2006)
- Natale in crociera (2007)
- As God Commands (2008)
- Natale a Rio (2008)
- Many Kisses Later (2009)
- The Friends at the Margherita Cafe (2009)
- Men vs. Women (2010)
- Women vs. Men (2011)
- The Worst Week of My Life (2011)
- Love Is in the Air (2012)
- The Worst Christmas of My Life (2012)
- Wannabe Widowed (2013)
- A Woman as a Friend (2014)
- Soap Opera (2015)
- Si accettano miracoli (2015)
- Tiramisù (2016)
- It's All About Karma (2017)
- Put Grandma in the Freezer (2018)
- When Mom Is Away (2019)
- When Mom Is Away... With the Family (2020)
- On Our Watch (2021)
- When Mom Is Away... With the In-laws (2025)

== Discography ==
- 2002 – Olmo & Friends.
