= Giorgia Würth =

Italian actress (born 1981)

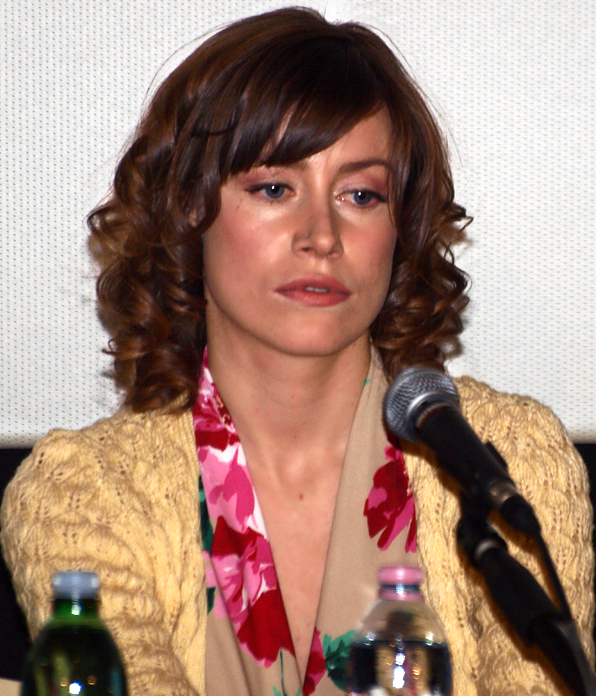
- Würth in 2012
- Born: 5 June 1981 (age 44); Genoa, Italy
- Occupation(s): Television presenter, actress
- Years active: 1998–present

Giorgia Würth (born 5 July 1979) is an Italian actress, television presenter and writer.

== Life and career ==
Born in Genoa, Würth grew up between Varazze and Milan, and earned a bachelor's degree in communication science and technology from IULM University. After working as a model, between 1998 and 2001 she was a television presenter on Disney Channel. Between 2003 and 2008, she served as television announcer on Rai 3.

In 2006, Würth made her film debut in Tagliare le parti in grigio by Vittorio Rifranti. She often collaborated with director Fausto Brizzi. On television, she is best known for playing Ilona Staller in the 2009 miniseries Moana. She made her directorial debut with Salvatrice, a documentary film about Sandra Milo which premiered at the Rome Film Festival. She is also an author of novels and short stories.
