= Alessandro Genovesi =

Italian director, screenwriter, playwright, and actor

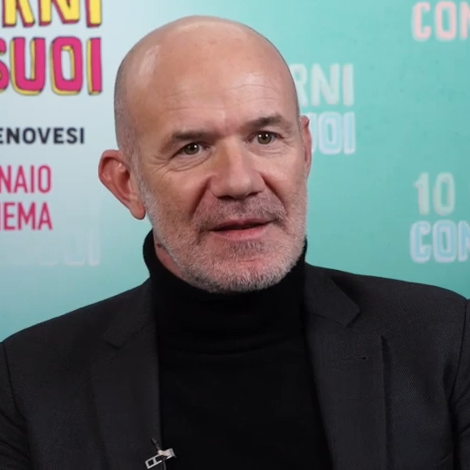
- Genovesi in 2025
- Born: 10 January 1973 (age 53); Milan, Italy
- Occupations: Director; Screenwriter

Alessandro Genovesi (born 10 January 1973) is an Italian director, screenwriter, playwright and actor.

== Life and career ==
Born in Milan, Genovesi started his professional career on stage, first as an actor and later as a playwright and a director. He had his breakout in 2007, with the play Happy Family he wrote and directed; the play won several awards, and in 2010 it was adapted in a film of the same title directed by Gabriele Salvatores in which Genovesi served as a screenwriter and assistant director.

Genovesi made his directorial film debut in 2011 with The Worst Week of My Life, which was a box office success and led to a sequel, still directed by Genovesi.

== Filmography ==
Year	Title	Director	Screenwriter	Actor	Notes
2010	Happy Family	Assistant	Yes	No	Based on Genovesi's play of the same name
2010	Angel of Evil	No	No	Yes	Cameo
2011	The Worst Week of My Life	Yes	Yes	Yes	Based on the British sitcom of the same name
2012	Love Is Not Perfect	No	No	Yes	
2013	The Worst Christmas of My Life	Yes	Yes	No	
2014	Soap Opera	Yes	Yes	No	
2015	What a Beautiful Surprise	Yes	Yes	Yes	
2015	Belli di papà	Yes	Yes	Yes	
2016	Tommaso	No	No	Yes	
2018	My Big Gay Italian Wedding	Yes	Yes	No	Based on the American play of the same name
2019	When Mom Is Away	Yes	Yes	No	
2020	When Mom Is Away... With the Family	Yes	Yes	Yes	
2021	Ridatemi mia moglie	Yes	Yes	No	TV minisieries. based on the British TV minisieries I Want My Wife Back. Also co-creator
2021	7 Women and a Murder	Yes	Yes	Yes	Based on the French film 8 Women
2024	The Tearsmith	Yes	Yes	No	
2024	Una famiglia sottosopra	Yes	Yes	No	
2025	When Mom Is Away... With the In-laws	Yes	Yes	No	
