= List of Italian films of 2025 =

A list of Italian-produced and co-produced feature films released or scheduled for release in Italy in 2025.

== Films ==
Title	Director	Cast	Notes	Ref
Where Storks Dare (Dove osano le cicogne)	Fausto Brizzi	Angelo Pintus, Marta Zoboli, Beatrice Arnera	Released 1 January	
I Am the End of the World (Io sono la fine del mondo)	Gennaro Nunziante	Angelo Duro, Giorgio Colangeli, Simone Montedoro	Released 9 January	
The Illusion (L'abbaglio)	Roberto Andò	Toni Servillo, Salvatore Ficarra Valentino Picone, Tommaso Ragno, Giulia Andò, Pascal Greggory, Clara Ponsot	Released 16 January	
When Mom Is Away... With the In-laws (10 giorni con i suoi)	Alessandro Genovesi	Fabio De Luigi, Valentina Lodovini	Released 23 January	
Let Me Get a Look at You (Fatti vedere)	Tiziano Russo	Matilde Gioli	Released 6 February	
Adventures Italian Style Reloaded (Tornando a est)	Antonio Pisu	Lodo Guenzi, Jacopo Constantini	Released 13 February	
Madly (Follemente)	Paolo Genovese	Edoardo Leo, Pilar Fogliati	Released 20 February	
U.S. Palmese	Manetti Bros.	Rocco Papaleo, Blaise Afonso, Giulia Maenza, and Claudia Gerini	Release 20 March	
The Tasters (Le assaggiatrici)	Silvio Soldini	Elisa Schlott, Max Riemelt, Alma Hasun	Release 27 March	
Siblings (La vita da grandi)	Greta Scarano	Matilda De Angelis, Maria Amelia Monti, Paolo Hendel	Release 3 April	
Paternal Leave	Alissa Jung	Luca Marinelli, Juli Grabenhenrich	Release 15 May	
Three Goodbyes (Tre ciotole)	Isabel Coixet	Alba Rohrwacher, Elio Germano	Release 9 October	
Life Goes This Way (La vita va così)	Riccardo Milani	Diego Abatantuono, Virginia Raffaele	Release 23 October	
Buen Camino	Gennaro Nunziante	Checco Zalone	Release 25 December	

== Box office ==
The ten highest-grossing Italian films in 2025, by in-year domestic box office gross revenue, were as follows:

Highest-grossing Italian films of 2025
Rank	Title	Distributor	Admissions	Domestic gross (€)
1	Buen Camino	Medusa Film	4,481,901	36,053,987
2	Madly (Follemente)	01 Distribution	2,475,983	17,954,560
3	Diamonds (Diamanti) ‡	Vision Distribution	1,399,088	9,830,399
4	I Am the End of the World (Io sono la fine del mondo)	Vision Distribution	1,265,881	9,736,428
5	Oi vita mia	PiperFilm	1,130,575	8,501,160
6	Life Goes This Way (La vita va così)	Medusa Film	1,001,491	6,970,810
7	When Mom Is Away... With the In-laws (10 giorni con i suoi)	Medusa Film	640,023	4,624,102
8	The Illusion (L'abbaglio)	01 Distribution	528,055	3,425,449
9	The Tasters (Le assaggiatrici)	Vision Distribution	506,961	3,355,927
10	Maria	01 Distribution	474,896	3,238,794
‡: 2024 theatrical opening

== See also ==
- 71st David di Donatello
- List of 2025 box office number-one films in Italy
- 2025 in Italy
- 2025 in film
