= Andrea Pisani (actor) =

Italian actor and comedian (born 1987)

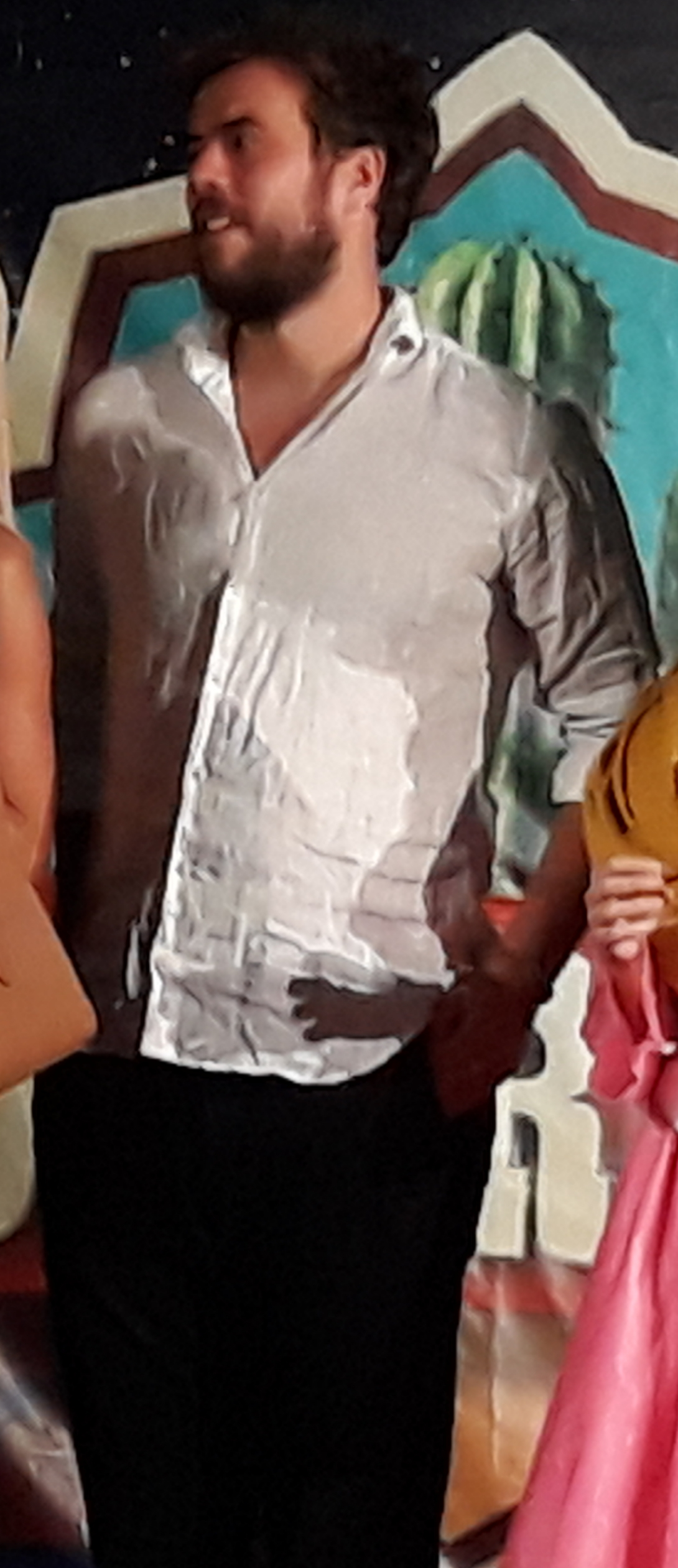
- Pisani in 2019
- Born: 17 May 1987 (age 39); Turin, Italy
- Occupations: Actor, comedian, TV presenter
- Years active: 2007–present

Andrea Pisani (born 17 May 1987) is an Italian actor, comedian and television presenter.

== Career ==
Pisani formed the comedy duo PanPers with Luca Peracino in 2007. They participated in the Zelig comedy workshops in Turin and Milan. Since 2009, he has participated in the Italia 1 comedy show Colorado, together with Peracino. In 2013, the duo made their film debut in Fuga di cervelli by Paolo Ruffini.

In 2015, he starred in Belli di papà by Guido Chiesa. In 2016, he reunited with Peracino in I babysitter, directed by Giovanni Bognetti. In 2017, he starred in Classe Z, once again directed by Chiesa.

In 2022, Pisani had the lead role in the comedy film Il mammone, a remake of the French film Tanguy. The same year, he debuted as a host in the comedy show Only Fun – Comico Show on Nove, alongside Peracino and Elettra Lamborghini.

== Personal life ==
From 2021 to 2025, Pisani was in a relationship with actress Beatrice Arnera. In 2024, they had a daughter named Matilde.

== Filmography ==
Film
Year	Title	Role	Notes
2013	Fuga di cervelli	Alonso	Film debut
2015	Belli di papà	Matteo Liuzzi	
2016	I babysitter	Mario	
2017	Classe Z	Marco Andreoli	
2018	Ti presento Sofia	Chicco	
2020	Cambio tutto!	Valerio	
2022	Il mammone	Aldo Bonelli	
2023	So tutto di te	Pallino's owner	
2025	30 notti con il mio ex	Roberto	
2026	Cena di classe	Guido Bonelli	

Television
Year	Title	Role	Notes
2011–2012	In tour	Lenny	TV series; main role
2012	Life Bites – Pillole di vita	Lenny	TV series; episode "La band"

== Television programs ==
- Colorado (Italia 1, 2009–2019)
- Celebrity Games (Italia 1, 2012)
- Shot Time (Italia 1, 2014)
- Enjoy – Ridere fa bene (Italia 1, 2020)
- Honolulu (Italia 1, 2021)
- Before Pintus (Amazon Prime Video, 2021)
- Only Fun – Comico Show (Nove, 2022–present)
- Zelig (Canale 5, 2023)
- LOL - Chi ride è fuori (Amazon Prime Video, 2025)
