= Frank Matano =

Italian comedian, actor, and television personality (born 1989)

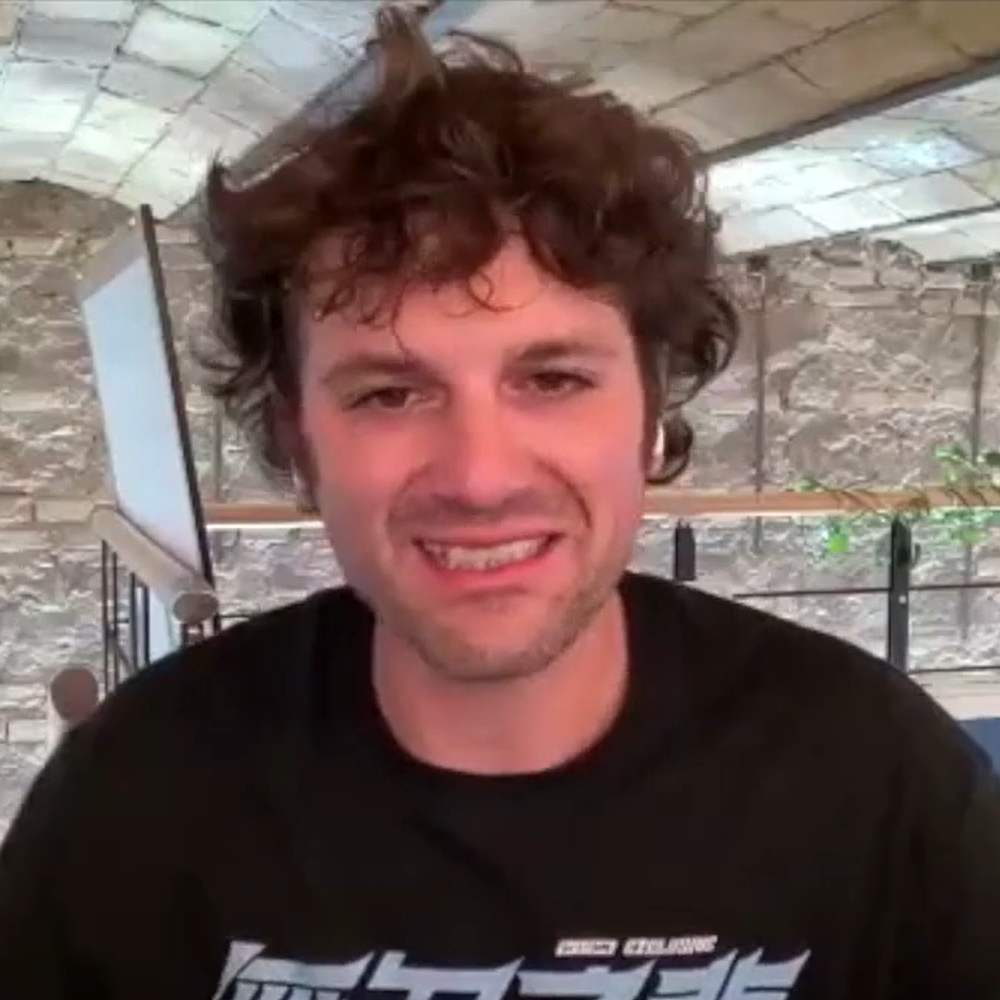
- Matano in 2024
- Born: Francesco Matano; 14 September 1989 (age 37); Santa Maria Capua Vetere, Italy
- Occupations: Comedian; YouTuber; actor; voice actor; television personality
- Years active: 2008–present
- Height: 1.86 m (6 ft 1 in)

Francesco Matano (Italian pronunciation: [franˈtʃesko maˈtaːno]; born 14 September 1989) is an Italian comedian, actor, and television personality who rose to prominence in 2008 by publishing prank videos on YouTube, and was among the first Italian YouTubers to surpass one million subscribers. Shortly following his online success, Matano eventually joined into the television industry.

Matano debuted on Le Iene in 2009, serving as an envoy and presenter. In 2015 and 2021, he respectively became a judge and competitor (later host) on Italia's Got Talent and LOL – Chi ride è fuori. During his career, he was a host on many TV series and comedy and talent shows, appeared in several web series and music videos, worked as a voice actor, and held several stand-up comedy shows and on theatre.

== Early life and YouTube ==
Matano was born on 14 September 1989 in Santa Maria Capua Vetere, in the province of Caserta, to an Italian father and an American mother. He grew up in Carinola but studied as a teenager in the United States, where he graduated from Cranston High School East in Rhode Island. He briefly studied languages at the University of Cassino and Southern Lazio but did not take any exams.

In 2007, at the age of 18, Matano, also known as LaMenteContorta (The Twisted Mind), found success online with his YouTube channel in Italy, which rose to one million subscribers. He was among the most successful Italian YouTubers, alongside the likes of CutiePieMarzia (Marzia Kjellberg), Favij (Lorenzo Ostuni), CiccioGamer89 (Mirko Alessandrini), and Yotobi (Karim Musa). His videos consisted mainly of telephone pranks and social experiments; as of March 2025, his main YouTube channel had 1.3 million of subscribers, while his gameplay channel with Let's Play videos had around 800,000–900,000 subscribers between 2015 and 2020.

== Career ==
=== Le Iene, web series, and acting debut (2009–2014) ===
Matano's first television appearance was in 2009 on Le Iene. The following year, he presented a program on Sky Italia dedicated to telephone pranks called Sky Scherzando? In 2011, he participated on Ti lascio una canzone by Antonella Clerici, conducting short interviews with the cast. In 2012, he participated in the Lost in Google web series with The Jackal. Also in 2012, he appeared in the web series Apocalypse Gay on La3 directed by Matteo Martinez. In September 2012, he hosted 2012 Prima di morire on La3 alongside Jacopo Morini.

In 2013, Matano appeared in the music video for "Ragazzo inadeguato" by singer-songwriter Max Pezzali. Also in 2013, he began hosting Scherzi da paura and the Web Show Awards on La3, the web series Vita tra coinquilini, and also started his acting career. He made his debut in Fuga di cervelli, which was directed by Paolo Ruffini. During the same year, he created a second channel on YouTube dedicated to video games called "FRANK MATANO Games". In 2014, he starred in Tutto molto bello, also directed by Ruffini, and was part of the stand-up comedy X-LOVE (Stand Up Comedy) on Italia 1.

=== Voice acting, Web Show Awards, and Revelation of the Year (2014–2015) ===
In 2014, Matano began his dubbing career, performing an Italian translation of South Park with commentary; he later was the Italian voice actor of Duke Donnolesi in Zootopia (2016) and Zootopia 2 (2025), Darius in Sing 2 (2021), Duke Weaselton in Zootopia+ (2022), Stratosphere in Transformers: Rise of the Beasts (2023), and Donato in Il Baracchino (2025). In December 2014, he was among the winners of the Web Show Awards. In 2015, he appeared on television as an envoy of Le Iene presentano: Scherzi a parte, a crossover of Le Iene and the hidden camera-practical joke series Scherzi a parte planning jokes on victims Paolo Brosio, who is a journalist known for his Christian faith, and Ruffini. That same year, Matano starred alongside Claudio Bisio in the film What a Beautiful Surprise, which was directed by Alessandro Genovesi. He also began serving as one of the judges on Italia's Got Talent, and was a quest judge on Tale e quale show.

In May 2015, Matano was announced as the recipient for the Revelation of the Year award at the TV Direction Awards. In October 2025, he was the subject of an imitation by comedian Maurizio Crozza, who wore a wig and plaid shirt, with a guitar, and an infectious laugh as he put his hand to his nose and announced: "This will get me 800,000 views." Although it attracted some criticism and doubts due to its ferocious satire and the vehemence with which it was staged, and because it was seen as a wide critique of the Italian YouTube community, Matano appreciated it, and of Crozza said that he was among the best comedians in Italy.

=== Return to Le Iene and further films (2016–2019) ===
In 2016, Matano hosted Mago Matano, his first web series. Starting on 16 October 2016, he began to host the midweek episodes of Le Iene with Ilary Blasi and Giampaolo Morelli. Towards the end of 2015 and the beginning of 2016, he began the process of voicing Donnolesi in Zootopia. In 2017, Matano appeared in the music video of "Volare" by fellow entertainer Fabio Rovazzi featuring the long-tenured singer Gianni Morandi. In November 2017, together with Claudio Bisio, he presented The Comedians, which was broadcast on TV8, where they played as themselves.

In 2018, Matano starred in I'm Back, which was directed by Luca Miniero. Also in 2018, he was the protagonist of Tonno spiaggiato, which was directed by Matteo Martinez. On 4 February 2018, he participated as a competitor along with Iva Zanicchi on the special edition of Guess My Age – Indovina l'età led by Enrico Papi on the Italian channel TV8. In a 2019 interview promoting his next film Beware the Gorilla, a comedy directed by Miniero, Matano said: "No one knows how to bring people back to the theatre. There's no technique. If I knew... I'd be much richer! Even masterpieces or decent films aren't synonymous with box office success. ... [Zalone] speaks to everyone, but he's a miracle in his own right. He does other, almost alien things." Also in 2019, he appeared in the music video of "Non avere paura" by singer-songwriter Tommaso Paradiso.

=== Theatrical debut, LOL – Chi ride e fuori, and further works (2020–present) ===
In 2020, Matano made his theatrical debut with Franci alongside Francesco Arienzo. In a 2021 interview, with the COVID-19 pandemic in Italy still ongoing and being widely reported on television, he said "it's right that there is someone who offers a lot of lightheartedness" and added: "The entertainment world is very competitive. If someone speaks well of me, I'm delighted. I've given myself a rule: do what I love, regardless of where I am." Also in 2021, Matano participated as a competitor on LOL – Chi ride è fuori, an Italian comedy show on Amazon Prime, of which he later served as co-host. In October 2021, he starred in Una notte da dottore, which was directed by Guido Chiesa.

In 2022, Matano was a competitor, facing Mara Maionchi, on Games of Talent with celebrity chef Alessandro Borghese as host, hosted the comedy game show Prova prova sa sa, and appeared on The Bad Guy. On Amazon Prime, he also appeared with Christian De Sica and Pietro Sermonti in the 2023 comedy series Gigolo per caso, which was directed by Eros Puglielli. In 2024, he returned to theatrical work with Oversympathy. In November 2024, he was a guest judge on La corrida. In 2025, he was one of the judges of the talent show competition Ne vedremo delle belle, and was also a guest on GialappaShow.

== Personal life ==
Matano is in a relationship with Ylenia Azzurretti. Reported to be 1.86 m (6 ft 1 in) tall, he said: "I wouldn't want to be more handsome: if you're too attractive, you have trouble making people laugh." Owing to his upbringing in Campania, Matano is a supporter of SSC Napoli. As a teenager, he was nicknamed "Totti" in reference to AS Roma legend Francesco Totti. For the 2018–2019 Italian football season, he joined Carinola Calcio, the football team from his hometown that played in Prima Categoria, since 2014–2015 the seventh level in the Italian football league system organized by the National Amateur League through the Regional Committees. He compared his signing to that of Marco Borriello with UD Ibiza. He made his debut in October 2018.

== Filmography ==
=== Films ===
Year	Title	Role	Notes
2013	Fuga di cervelli	Franco Esposito	Feature film debut, directed by Paolo Ruffini
2014	Tutto molto bello	Antonio	Directed by Paolo Ruffini
2015	What a Beautiful Surprise	Paolo	Directed by Alessandro Genovesi
2016	Zootopia	Duke Weaselton (voice)	Italian voice-over role
2018	Tonno spiaggiato	Francesco	Directed by Matteo Martinez
2018	I'm Back	Andrea Canaletti	Directed by Luca Miniero
2019	Beware the Gorilla	Lorenzo Caputo	Directed by Luca Maniero
2021	Una notte da dottore	Mario	Directed by Guido Chiesa
2021	Sing 2	Darius (voice)	Italian voice-over role
2023	Transformers: Rise of the Beasts	Stratosphere (voice)	Italian voice-over role
2026	Quasi vera	Diego	

=== Television ===
Year	Title	Role	Notes
2009–2013; 2016, 2018	Le Iene	Himself, reporter; host	Variety show on Italia 1 (seasons 13–17, 20, 22)
2010	Sky Scherzando?	Himself, host	Comedy series on Sky Uno
2011	Ti lascio una canzone	Himself, co-host	Talent show on Rai 1 (season 5)
2012	2012 prima di morire		Comedy show on La3
2012	Apocalypse Gay		Web series directed by Matteo Martinez
2012	Lost in Google	Himself	Web series directed by Francesco Capaldo
2013	Scherzi da paura		On La3
2013–2015	Web Show Awards		On La3
2013–2015, 2017–2018	Vita tra coinquilini		Web series directed by Matteo Martinez
2014	X-LOVE (Stand Up Comedy)		Stand-up comedy show on Italia 1
2014	South Park	Additional voices	2 episodes
2015	Le Iene presentano: Scherzi a parte	Himself, reporter	Crossover version with Le Iene on Canale 5
2015	Tale e quale show	Himself, guest judge	Variety talent show on Rai 1
2015–present	Italia's Got Talent	Himself, judge	Talent show (season 6–present) on Sky Uno, Cielo, TV8, and Disney+
2016	Mago Matano		Web series directed by Matteo Martinez
2017	The Comedians	Frank	Main role, 10 episodes, on TV8
2018	Guess My Age Special Edition	Himself, guest	Contestant for one episode, on TV8
2021–2024	LOL – Chi ride è fuori	Himself	Contestant (season 1), co-host (season 2), on Amazon Prime Video
2021	Game of Talents		On TV8
2022	The Bad Guy	Stage director	Episode: "I Saw a Light", on Amazon Prime Video
2022	Zootopia+	Duke Weaselton (voice)	Main role; 6 episodes, on Disney+
2022–2023	Prova prova sa sa	Himself, host	On Amazon Prime Video
2023	Gigolò per caso	Luigi	Main role, on Amazon Prime Video
2024	La corrida	Leader of the people	On Nove
2025	Ne vedremo delle belle	Himself, judge	Talent show on Rai 1
2025	Il Baracchino	Donato	Main role (voice), directed by Nicolò Cuccì and Salvo Di Paola on Amazon Prime Video
2025	Gialappa Show		On TV8

=== Theatre ===
Year	Title	Role	Notes
2020	Franci		
2024	Oversympathy		

=== Music videos ===
Year	Title	Artist(s)	Notes
2013	"Ragazzo inadeguato"	Max Pezzali	
2017	"Volare"	Fabio Rovazzi featuring Gianni Morandi	
2019	"Non avere paura"	Tommaso Paradiso	
