= What's Your Sign? (2014 film) =

- Italian: Ma tu di che segno sei?
- Directed by: Neri Parenti
- Written by: Neri Parenti; Carlo Vanzina; Enrico Vanzina
- Starring: Massimo Boldi; Ricky Memphis; Gigi Proietti; Vincenzo Salemme; Pio e Amedeo; Vanessa Hessler; Angelo Pintus; Mariana Rodríguez; Denise Tantucci; Paolo Fox
- Cinematography: Gino Sgreva
- Edited by: Luca Montanari
- Music by: Bruno Zambrini
- Release date: December 11, 2014
- Running time: 98 minutes
- Country: Italy
- Language: Italian

What's Your Sign? (Italian: Ma tu di che segno sei?) is a 2014 Italian comedy film directed by Neri Parenti.

== Cast ==
- Massimo Boldi as Carlo Rabagliati
- Ricky Memphis as Saturno Bolla
- Gigi Proietti as Giuliano De Marchis
- Vincenzo Salemme as Augusto Fioretti
- Pio D'Antini as Piero Lo Muscio
- Amedeo Grieco as Andrea Tricarico
- Vanessa Hessler as Nina Rocchi
- Angelo Pintus as Bruno Quagliarullo
- Mariana Rodríguez as Monica Veloso
- Denise Tantucci as Ilaria Fioretti
- Paolo Fox as himself
- Rodolfo Laganà as Pannuti
- Valeria Graci as Lawyer Comodi
- Ludovica Modugno as Anna De Marchis
- Luis Molteni as Dr. Mosca
- Pierluigi Misasi as Lawyer Milito
- Cecilia D'Amico as Wanda
- Federica Nargi as Nina's friend
- Riccardo Cicogna as a customer
- Ludovica Bizzaglia as Delia Lampo
- Mino Caprio as Vincenzi
- Gianni Franco as Dr. Pellegrino
- Mirko Frezza as Er Puzzone
- Manuela Morabito as Mrs. Veronici
- Orfeo Orlando as Gianviti
- Tullio Sorrentino as Er Piattola
