= List of 2025 box office number-one films in Italy =

The following is a list of 2025 box office number-one films in Italy.

#	Weekend end date	Film	Gross	Notes	Ref.
1	5 January 2025	Sonic the Hedgehog 3	€3,448,941	#2 Mufasa: The Lion King with €2,829,980	
2	12 January 2025	I Am the End of the World	€2,338,084	#2 Diamonds with €1,797,791	
3	19 January 2025	I Am the End of the World	€2,596,623	#2 The Illusion with €1,328,506	
4	26 January 2025	When Mom Is Away... With the In-laws	€1,746,321	#2 I Am the End of the World with €1,365,429	
5	2 February 2025	When Mom Is Away... With the In-laws	€1,071,007	#2 A Complete Unknown with €880,121	
6	9 February 2025	When Mom Is Away... With the In-laws	€722,190	#2 The Brutalist with €586,431	
7	16 February 2025	Captain America: Brave New World	€2,386,669	#2 The Brutalist with €370,344	
8	23 February 2025	Madly	€3,958,917	#2 Captain America: Brave New World with €1,287,061	
9	2 March 2025	Madly	€3,733,089	#2 Bridget Jones: Mad About the Boy with €850,667	
10	9 March 2025	Madly	€2,252,048	#2 Mickey 17 with €813,514	
11	16 March 2025	Madly	€1,636,995	#2 Mickey 17 with €696,596	
12	23 March 2025	Snow White	€3,799,284	#2 Madly with €1,113,924	
13	30 March 2025	Snow White	€1,507,531	#2 The Tasters with €792,378	
14	6 April 2025	A Minecraft Movie	€4,755,919	#2 The Tasters with €626,377	
15	13 April 2025	A Minecraft Movie	€1,061,665	#2 The Tasters with €193,375	
16	20 April 2025	A Minecraft Movie	€1,299,764	#2 30 notti con il mio ex with €449.819	
17	27 April 2025	A Minecraft Movie	€774,117	#2 Until Dawn with €646,469	
18	4 May 2025	Thunderbolts*	€1,816,144	#2 Black Bag with €392,871	
19	11 May 2025	Thunderbolts*	€982,730	#2 Black Bag with €210,614	
20	18 May 2025	Final Destination Bloodlines	€594,951	#2 Thunderbolts* with €646,469	
21	25 May 2025	Lilo & Stitch	€7,143,081	#2 Mission: Impossible – The Final Reckoning with €1,567,102	
22	1 June 2025	Lilo & Stitch	€3,990,203	#2 Mission: Impossible – The Final Reckoning with €776,694	
23	8 June 2025	Lilo & Stitch	€1,475,232	#2 How to Train Your Dragon with €485,513	
24	15 June 2025	How to Train Your Dragon	€2,359,707	#2 Lilo & Stitch with €1,003,234	
25	22 June 2025	How to Train Your Dragon	€1,632,971	#2 Elio with €643,876	
26	29 June 2025	F1	€1,589,340	#2 How to Train Your Dragon with €781,538	
27	6 July 2025	Jurassic World Rebirth	€3,364,889	#2 F1 with €906,155	
28	13 July 2025	Jurassic World Rebirth	€1,678,501	#2 Superman with €1,555,646	
29	20 July 2025	Superman	€1,004,397	#2 Jurassic World Rebirth with €863,581	
30	27 June 2025	The Fantastic Four: First Steps	€2,542,643	#2 Jurassic World Rebirth with €516,553	
31	3 August 2025	The Fantastic Four: First Steps	€1,320,925	#2 Jurassic World Rebirth with €368,347	
32	10 August 2025	Weapons	€528,397	#2 The Fantastic Four: First Steps with €478,317	
33	17 August 2025	Weapons	€389,841	#2 The Fantastic Four: First Steps with €302,199	
34	24 August 2025	The Bad Guys 2	€1,140,690	#2 Weapons with €432,080	
35	31 August 2025	Smurfs	€1,212,823	#2 The Bad Guys 2 with €681,374	
36	5 September 2025	The Conjuring: Last Rites	€3,964,285	#2 Materialists with € 683,907	
37	12 September 2025	Demon Slayer: Infinity Castle	€2,645,612		
38	19 September 2025	The Conjuring: Last Rites	€630,470		
39	26 September 2025	One Battle After Another	€1,069,334		
40	3 October 2025	One Battle After Another	€1,085,111		
41	10 October 2025	One Battle After Another	€758,852	Tron: Ares debuted at #2	
42	17 October 2025	After the Hunt	€619,758	#2 Three Goodbyes with €555.469	
43	24 October 2025	Life Goes This Way	€1,561,653	#2 Springsteen: Deliver Me from Nowhere with €636,366	

== Highest-grossing films of 2025 ==
International film Italian film

Highest-grossing films of 2025 (In-year release)
Rank	Title	Distributor	Domestic gross
1.	Lilo & Stitch	Walt Disney Pictures	€22.357.688
2.	Madly	01 Distributors	€17.946.199
3.	A Minecraft Movie	Warner Bros.	€11.973.716
4.	Jurassic World Rebirth	Universal Pictures	€10.931.729
5.	I Am the End of the World	Vision Distributors	€9.736.405
6.	How to Train Your Dragon	Universal Pictures	€9.158.616
7.	Sonic the Hedgehog 3	Eagle Pictures	€8.739.382
8.	The Conjuring: Last Rites	New Line Cinema	€8.429.284
9.	The Fantastic Four: First Steps	Walt Disney Pictures	€8.180.696
10.	Snow White	Walt Disney Pictures	€7.194.555

== See also ==
- List of Italian films of 2025
- List of 2024 box office number-one films in Italy
- 2025 in Italy

Preceded by 2024 Box office number-one films	Box office number-one films 2025	Succeeded by 2026 Box office number-one films
