= Fuga di cervelli =

- Theatrical release poster
- Directed by: Paolo Ruffini
- Written by: Paolo Ruffini; Guido Chiesa; Giovanni Bognetti
- Starring: Paolo Ruffini; Frank Matano; Guglielmo Scilla; Luca Peracino; Andrea Pisani; Olga Kent
- Cinematography: Federico Masiero
- Edited by: Claudio Di Mauro
- Music by: Andrea Farri
- Production company: Medusa Film
- Distributed by: Medusa Distribuzione
- Release date: 21 November 2013
- Running time: 100 minutes
- Country: Italy
- Language: Italian

Fuga di cervelli (lit. 'Brain drain') is a 2013 Italian comedy film directed by Paolo Ruffini.

It is a remake of the 2009 Spanish film Brain Drain (Fuga de cerebros).

== Cast ==
- Paolo Ruffini as Alfredo
- Frank Matano as Franco
- Guglielmo Scilla as Lebowski
- Luca Peracino as Emilio
- Andrea Pisani as Alonso
- Olga Kent (dubbed by Valentina Favazza) as Nadia
- Gaia Messerklinger as Claudia
- Giulia Ottonello as Karen
- Niccolò Senni as Chamberlain
- Rosalia Porcaro as Franco's mother
- Biagio Izzo as Franco's uncle
- Marco Messeri as Alfredo's father
- Michela Andreozzi as Lebowski's mother
- Andrea Buscemi as Alonso's father
- Daniel McVicar as Dean Perry
- John Peter Sloan as the waiter
