= Tutto molto bello =

- Film poster
- Directed by: Paolo Ruffini
- Written by: Giovanni Bognetti; Guido Chiesa; Marco Pettenello; Paolo Ruffini
- Starring: Paolo Ruffini; Frank Matano; Gianluca Fubelli; Nina Seničar; Angelo Pintus; Chiara Francini
- Cinematography: Federico Masiero
- Edited by: Claudio Di Mauro
- Music by: Claudia Campolongo
- Release date: 9 October 2014
- Running time: 86 minutes
- Country: Italy
- Language: Italian

Tutto molto bello is a 2014 Italian comedy film directed by Paolo Ruffini.

== Cast ==
- Paolo Ruffini as Giuseppe
- Frank Matano as Antonio
- Gianluca Fubelli as Eros
- Nina Seničar as Eva
- Angelo Pintus as Serafino
- Chiara Francini as Anna
- Paolo Calabresi as Marcello
- Chiara Gensini as Katia
- Enrica Guidi as Ambra
- Ahmed Hefiane as the Emir
- Pupo as himself
