= Matteo Curallo =

Italian musician and composer

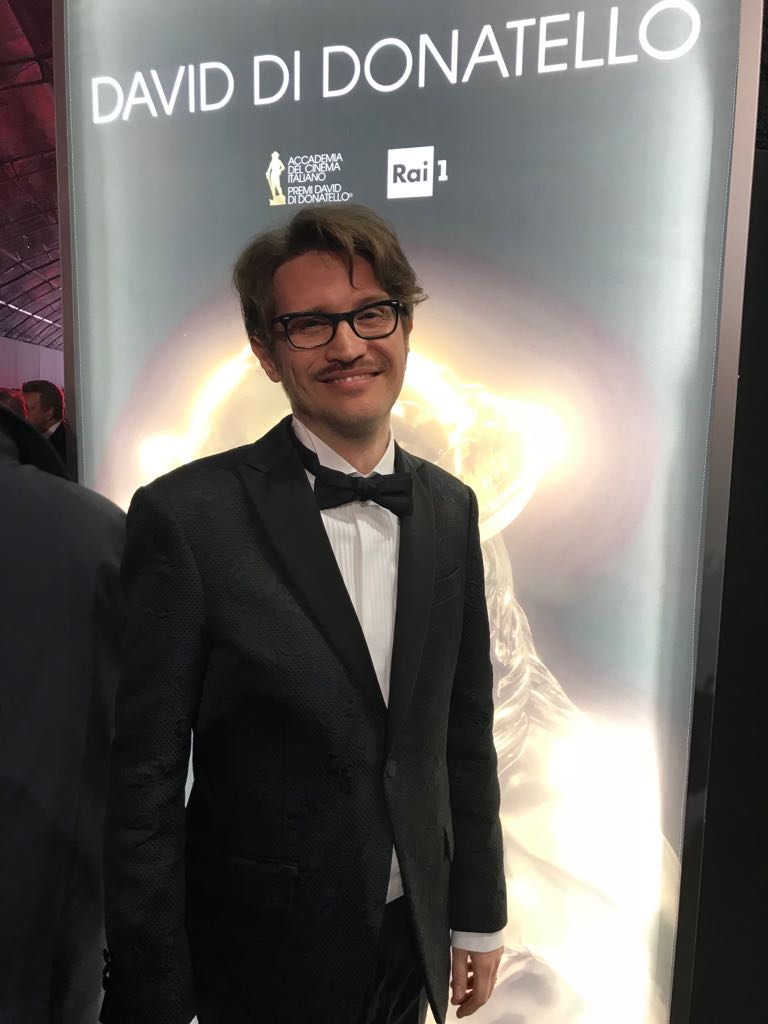

Background information
- Born: Asti, Italy
- Genres: Pop, rock, soundtracks, commercial spots
- Occupations: Musician, composer, and sound designer
- Years active: 2001
- Label: Sugar

Matteo Curallo (born 25 January 1976, in Asti) is an Italian musician and composer.

== Biography ==
Curallo studied electronic music at the Conservatorio Statale di Musica Giuseppe Verdi in Turin. He holds a degree in sound design from the Brera Academy in Milan.

He began his career in 2001 when he worked on the music and the artistic production of Modho’s album, Soluzioni.

=== Music for theatre ===
In the 2000s, Curallo worked as a theatrical composer for shows that were performed both in Italy and abroad. These include Il Deserto Dei Tartari, Polvere, Il Piccolo Principe, and La Gabbianella e Il Gatto.

He also put various shows to music for the Teatro Piemonte Europa Foundation, which were played in Italy and France. These included: Bar Franco-Italien, written by Myriam Tanant, directed by Jean Claude Penchenat, and Remake with Giulia Lazzarini (actress in Strehler, Ronconi), also in Piccolo Theatre of Milan. In 2008, with the Nut Performance group, he won the Gran Premio della Giuria del Jongeren Performance Festival of Groeningen with the work Le 7 solitudini. It was chosen by the jury for its "high level of execution and for the innovative performance of the work, not excluding its original and well dosed mix between visual art, movement, use of words and live electronic music”.

=== Music for record companies ===
In 2009, Curallo produced tracks for the show Concerto senza Titolo with Antonella Ruggiero.

In addition to his experience with Modho, he has also worked with other artists. He worked with the singer Luca Morino (singer in Mau Mau) for the Mistic Turistic - Moleskine Ballads project, producing a record and a touring show of images and music. He worked on the artistic production of the album Dico a tutti così (finalist at the Premio Teneo 2009 as opera prima) for singer and songwriter Roberta Carrieri. He worked with Elisa Casile on her debut album Orchidee winner of Sanremo Lab 2008. Since 2011 Curallo has worked with Mauro Ermanno Giovanardi and Massimo Cotto on the theatrical show Chelsea Hotel.

He worked as a writer for Andrea Bocelli ("Nelle tue mani" from Gladiator) and La Crus ("Io Confesso" revelation track at Sanremo Music Festival in 2011 written with M.E. Giovanardi)

=== Music for cinema, TV and commercials ===
In 2012, Curallo signed to produce music and sound design for the horror movie Evil Things, which was nominated for Best Soundtrack at the “La Chioma di Berenice 2013” during the Festival Internazionale del Cinema di Roma. He modified the title track “Hey Sister” (written by Violante Placido), which was nominated as the best original song at Nastri D’Argento in 2013.

He collaborated with Boosta in the arrangement of 1992, a series about political corruption, directed by Giuseppe Gagliardi, which aired in the autumn of 2014 on Sky Atlantic. The same year he wrote the music for Pericolo Verticale, a factual series by Simone Gandolfo, on Sky Uno, and scored the innovative web series Under by Ivan Silvestrini.

In 2015 he worked on the soundtracks of the docufilms produced by Sky Cinema and Sky Arte: Firenze e gli Uffizi in 3D/4K San Pietro e le Basiliche Papali 3D, and Raffaello, il Principe delle Arti.

He composed music for Giovanni Bognetti’s film I babysitter in 2016, and for the series Donne on Rai 1, based on Andrea Camilleri’s book.

In 2020 he composed music for Nir Bergman's film Here We Are.

Curallo put various commercial spots to music for Ferrero, Natuzzi, Heineken, and Italotreno.
