= The Seed of Discord =

- Directed by: Pappi Corsicato
- Written by: Heinrich von Kleist (novel); Massimo Gaudioso; Pappi Corsicato
- Produced by: Marco Poccioni; Marco Valsania
- Starring: Caterina Murino; Alessandro Gassmann; Martina Stella; Michele Venitucci; Valeria Fabrizi; Isabella Ferrari
- Cinematography: Ennio Guarnieri
- Edited by: Giogiò Franchini
- Production companies: Rodeo Drive; Medusa Film; Sky Cinema
- Release date: 5 September 2008
- Running time: 85 minutes
- Country: Italy
- Language: Italian
- Budget: 300,000 €
- Box office: 674,151 €

The Seed of Discord (Italian: Il seme della discordia) is a 2008 Italian film. The film is a modernisation of Heinrich von Kleist's novel The Marquise of O. It was entered into the main competition at the 65th Venice International Film Festival.

== Plot ==
A married and faithful Italian woman finds herself pregnant the same day her husband is discovered to be sterile.

== Cast ==
- Caterina Murino – Veronica
- Alessandro Gassman – Mario
- Martina Stella – Nike
- Valeria Fabrizi – Veronica's mother
- Michele Venitucci – Gabriele
- Angelo Infanti – Veronica's father
- Lucilla Agosti – Dancer
- Iaia Forte – Lover
- Monica Guerritore – Doctor
- Rosalia Porcaro – Lover
- Isabella Ferrari – Monica
- Eleonora Pedron – Gabriele's girlfriend

== Production ==
Caterina Murino said it was very difficult for her to play the shower scene. "I wanted my body completely covered in foam, of all kinds, whipped with a whisk to make it more solid and water resistant but eventually there is little left of it".

== Soundtrack ==
The original soundtrack includes Mina's version of "Canta Ragazzina".
