= Un weekend artificiale =

2026 Italian comedy film

- Directed by: Leonardo Pieraccioni
- Written by: Filippo Bologna; Leonardo Pieraccioni
- Starring: Leonardo Pieraccioni; Giulia Vecchio; Herbert Ballerina; Massimo Ceccherini; Tosca D'Aquino; Giovanni Esposito; Paolo Hendel; Alessandro Mauthe; Roberto Zibetti; Marta Zoboli; Giorgio Panariello
- Distributed by: Vision Distribution
- Release date: 12 November 2026
- Country: Italy
- Language: Italian

Un weekend artificiale (transl. An Artificial Weekend) is a 2026 Italian comedy film directed by Leonardo Pieraccioni. It was released in Italy on 12 November 2026.

== Cast ==
- Leonardo Pieraccioni as Leonardo
- Giulia Vecchio as Cristina
- Herbert Ballerina as Nello
- Massimo Ceccherini
- Tosca D'Aquino
- Giovanni Esposito
- Paolo Hendel
- Alessandro Mauthe
- Roberto Zibetti
- Marta Zoboli
- Giorgio Panariello
