= Quasi vera =

2026 comedy film directed by Fausto Brizzi

- Directed by: Fausto Brizzi
- Screenplay by: Fausto Brizzi; Gianluca Belardi; Roberto Lipari; Herbert Simone Paragnani; Ignazio Rosato
- Story by: Marcello Iappelli; Beatrice Campagna; Fabio Guaglione
- Produced by: Giacomo Iuculano; Attilio De Razza; Nicola Picone
- Starring: Frank Matano; Rocío Muñoz Morales; Andrea Perroni; Taylor Mega; Laura Chiatti
- Cinematography: Federico Annicchiarico
- Edited by: Luciana Pandolfelli
- Music by: Andrea Bonini
- Production companies: Tramp Ltd.; Medusa Film
- Distributed by: Medusa Film
- Release date: 1 October 2026 (Italy)
- Running time: 90 minutes
- Country: Italy
- Language: Italian

Quasi vera is a 2026 Italian comedy film directed by Fausto Brizzi and starring Frank Matano, Rocío Muñoz Morales, Andrea Perroni, Taylor Mega and Laura Chiatti. The film explores artificial intelligence, social media and digital identity through the story of an aspiring actor who creates a virtual influencer.

== Cast ==
- Frank Matano as Diego
- Rocío Muñoz Morales as Giulia
- Andrea Perroni
- Taylor Mega as Vera
- Laura Chiatti as Caterina
- Sergio Friscia as Giampi
- Federica Cifola
- Francesco Sole
- Maurizio Lops

== Release ==
The film was released theatrically in Italy on 1 October 2026.
