= PerdutaMente =

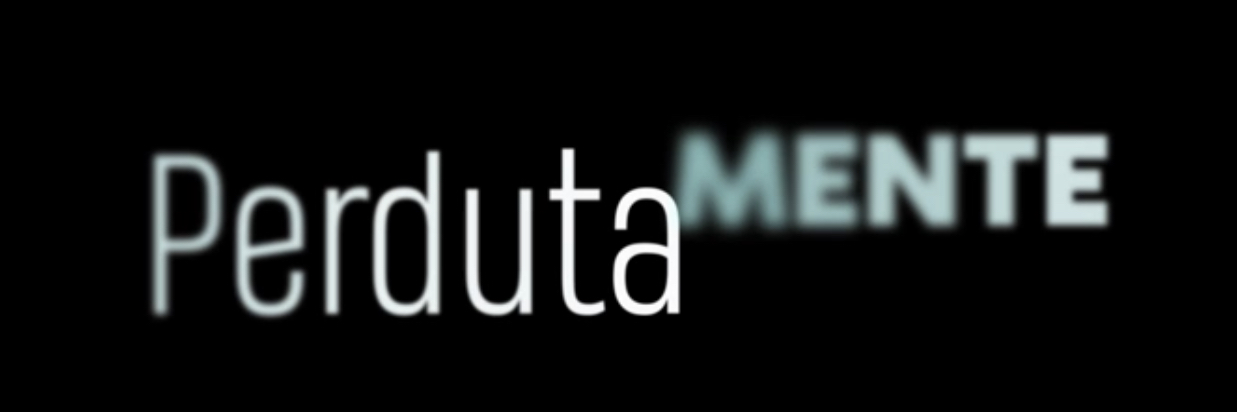
- Film logo
- Directed by: Ivana Di Biase, Paolo Ruffini
- Produced by: Paolo Ruffini, Nicola Nocella, Antonino Moscatt, Angelisa Castronovo
- Production companies: Vera Film s.r.l., WellSee s.r.l.
- Distributed by: Istituto Luce Cinecittà
- Release date: 2022
- Running time: 76 min
- Country: Italy
- Language: Italian

Perdutamente, graphically rendered PerdutaMente, is a 2022 documentary film directed by Paolo Ruffini and Ivana Di Biase, produced by Vera Film and WellSee and distributed by Luce Cinecittà. The documentary premiered in Italian cinemas on February 14, 2022, with a special three-day release. It was then made available on Sky, in the Sky Documentaries section and streaming on Now Tv.

== Content ==
The documentary addresses the topic of Alzheimer's disease through the stories and emotions of those who experience it firsthand and their family members.

Paolo Ruffini investigates the topic of Alzheimer's. The repercussions of the disease affect not only those who suffer from it, but also families who can collapse under the weight of the emotional burden. About one million people in Italy suffer from it, and as a result there are nearly three million people involved in caring for family members. In the initial stage, the patient enters a depression phase realizing that something is going wrong, then the depression often extends to family members.

In a video on Instagram, he asks people to share their personal experiences. Thus begins a journey around Italy that takes him to meet people who have lost loved ones or are caring for them during the course of the disease.

The first stop is in Biella, where he meets Franco, who tells him the story of his wife Teresa: "Alzheimer's is the sublimation of love because when you think of love, you have the idea of loving and being loved, in this case you love and you do not receive input in return." The journey continues, but Ruffini maintains an epistolary relationship with Franco that will continue throughout the documentary, telling him all the other stories.

One of the last stops is in Rome, to meet Lino Banfi, "grampa of the Italians," who has been assisting his wife Lucia for years.

To all the people he meets, Ruffini gives a tuning fork because "love is the soundtrack that our life cannot compose without us." It's as if Alzheimer's wants to interrupt that music, but we don't let it completely. You don't lose the pitch with love, there is a need to find the note again with life."

== Reception ==
The film received positive reviews, in La Stampa, and in various Italian media.
