= Rosalia Porcaro =

Italian actress, comedian, and cabaret performer

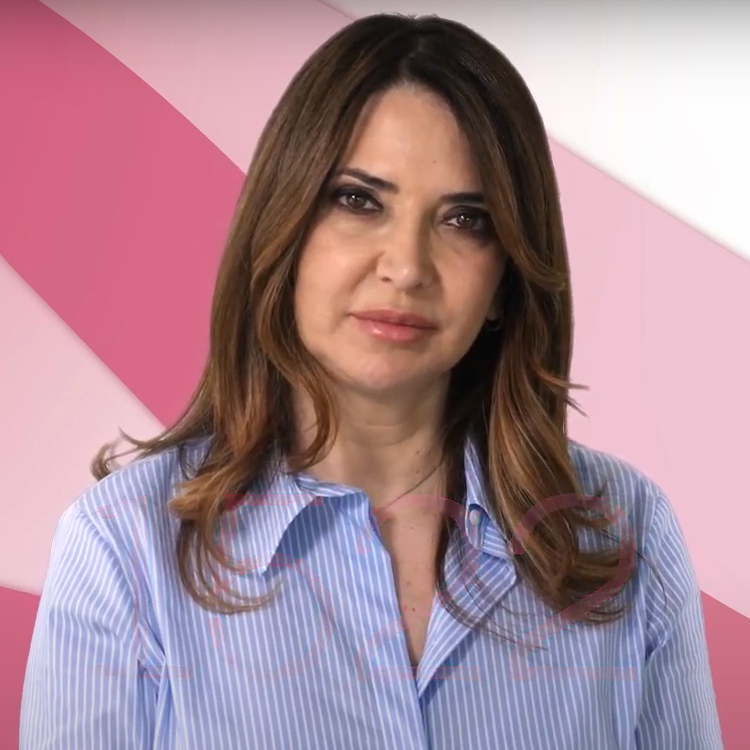
- Porcaro in 2022
- Born: January 27, 1966 (age 60); Casoria, Italy
- Occupations: Actress, comedian
- Years active: 1985–present

Rosalia Porcaro (born 27 January 1966) is an Italian actress, comedian, and cabaret performer. She is known for her stage and television work, as well as her comic characters such as Veronica, Natasha, Creolina, and Assundham.

== Early life ==
Porcaro was born in Casoria, near Naples, on 27 January 1966. She studied acting and joined theatre companies led by Antonio Casagrande, Rino Marcelli, and Renato Carpentieri.

== Career ==
Porcaro made her stage debut in 1985 at the Teatro Bellini in Naples, substituting for an actress in a play based on Eduardo Scarpetta’s comedies. She later performed in works by Jules Laforgue, Giambattista Basile, Luigi Pirandello, and Georges Feydeau.

In 1997 she appeared at the Maschio Angioino in Naples during a showcase for emerging comedians, presented by Francesco Paolantoni. Here she introduced her character Veronica, which became one of her most popular comic roles.

Porcaro gained national recognition through appearances on Italian television, including comedy shows and variety programs. She is also active in theatre, often performing pieces that explore women’s lives with irony and social critique.

In 2025 she returned to television in the third season of the Rai 1 series Mina Settembre.

== Style and characters ==
Porcaro is noted for her comic portrayals of everyday women, often exaggerating stereotypes to highlight social issues. Her characters include:

- Veronica – a young woman navigating modern relationships.
- Natasha – a parody of Eastern European immigrants in Italy.
- Creolina – a satirical take on Neapolitan working-class women.
- Assundham – a humorous character reflecting cultural misunderstandings.

== Selected filmography ==
=== Film ===
- The Seed of Discord (2008) – as Nunzia
- Fuga di cervelli (2013) – supporting role
- Guess Who's Coming for Christmas? (2013) – as Nunzia
- The Rich, the Pauper and the Butler (2014) – as Nunzia
- Love and Bullets (2017) – as Signora di Torre Annunziata
- Addio fottuti musi verdi (2017) – as Madre di Ciro
- Hotspot – Amore senza rete (2024) – as Eleonora
- Dobbiamo stare vicini (2024) – supporting role

=== Television ===
- Sabato, domenica e lunedì (2012, TV movie) – as Elena
- Zelig (2000s, variety show) – recurring comedian
- Mina Settembre (2025, Rai 1, season 3) – as Rosaria

=== Theatre ===
- Debut at Teatro Bellini (Naples, 1985) in a play by Eduardo Scarpetta
- Contemporary productions at Teatro Trianon Viviani (Naples, 2025)
