= I babysitter =

2016 Italian comedy film

- Theatrical release poster
- Directed by: Giovanni Bognetti
- Written by: Giovanni Bognetti
- Produced by: Maurizio Totti; Alessandro Usai
- Starring: Francesco Mandelli; Paolo Ruffini; Andrea Pisani; Luca Peracino; Simona Tabasco; Diego Abatantuono
- Cinematography: Federico Masiero
- Edited by: Danilo Torchia
- Music by: Matteo Curallo
- Production companies: Medusa Film; Colorado Film
- Release date: 19 October 2016 (Italy)
- Running time: 90 minutes
- Country: Italy
- Language: Italian

I babysitter is a 2016 Italian comedy film directed by Giovanni Bognetti, and starring Francesco Mandelli, Paolo Ruffini, Andrea Pisani, Luca Peracino, Simona Tabasco, and Diego Abatantuono.

The film is a remake of the 2014 French film Babysitting.

== Cast ==
- Francesco Mandelli as Andrea Tasso
- Paolo Ruffini as Aldo Morelli
- Andrea Pisani as Mario
- Luca Peracino as Ernesto
- Simona Tabasco as Sonia
- Diego Abatantuono as Gianni Porini
- Bruno Gambarotta as Mr. Luini
- Antonio Catania as Commissioner Nunzio Bassi
- Francesca Cavallin as Marta
- Francesco Facchinetti as deputy inspector Masuelli
- Davide DeMartin Pinter as Remo
- Alberto Farina as Tonino
- Giorgio Consoli as Antonio
- Michela Giraud as Marina
- Cristina Golotta as Mario's mother
