= Working Slowly (Radio Alice) =

- Directed by: Guido Chiesa
- Written by: Guido Chiesa; Wu Ming
- Starring: Claudia Pandolfi; Valerio Mastandrea
- Cinematography: Gherardo Gossi
- Music by: Teho Teardo
- Production companies: Fandango; Les Films des Tournelles; Roissy Films
- Release date: 2004
- Country: Italy
- Language: Italian

Working Slowly (Radio Alice) (Italian: Lavorare con lentezza) is a 2004 Italian drama film directed by Guido Chiesa. It is based on actual events involving Radio Alice, a 1970s pirate radio which was politically aligned with the autonomism movement.

It entered the competition at the 61st Venice International Film Festival, in which Tommaso Ramenghi and Marco Luisi won the Marcello Mastroianni Award.

The Wu Ming collective is also credited as co-writers of the screenplay. The film is published under a Creative Commons BY-NC-SA license, and can be downloaded from Archive.org

== Plot ==
1976, Bologna. Radio Alice is the radio of the movement: fantasy, refusal of wage labor, sexual freedom and cultural provocations. The radio, located in via del Pratello, is kept under control by the police, even if Lieutenant Lippolis is convinced that it is not worth wasting time on what he defines as a bunch of unrealistic, artistic and drug addicted students. A world foreign to law enforcement and "good citizens", but also to the majority of young people from the suburbs.

Like those of Safagna, on the eastern outskirts. Two boys in their twenties, Sgualo and Pelo, can only dream of a way out of the gray and oppressive everyday life. They hang out in the neighborhood bar and sometimes to remedy the chronic lack of money they do some "jobs" for a local fence, Marangon.

This time, however, Marangon offers them something different: dig a tunnel underground in the center. Objective: the Savings Bank in Piazza Minghetti. The two, not without hesitating, accept the risky undertaking.

But working tired, and to liven up the long night hours of "work", the two bring a radio into the tunnel. Against all logic, they find a station: Radio Alice. The "creative flow" of the broadcaster becomes the soundtrack of the pickaxe.

One night Pelo and Sgualo, found unable to continue the excavation due to a downpour, decide to go to the station and come into contact with the world of student activism.

Everything falls with the death of Francesco Lorusso, killed by a shot fired by a carabiniere on 11 March 1977 and with the violent clashes that ensue, clashes that totally involve the two protagonists, one arrested and the other fleeing on the roofs of Bologna to escape the police.

== Cast ==
- Claudia Pandolfi as Marta
- Valerio Mastandrea as Lt. Lippolis
- Marco Luisi as Pelo
- Tommaso Ramenghi as Sgualo
- Valerio Binasco as Marangon
- Massimo Coppola as Umberto
- Max Mazzotta as Lionello
- Afterhours as Area

== See also ==
- List of Italian films of 2004
