= Il mammone =

2022 Italian comedy film

- Theatrical release poster
- Directed by: Giovanni Bognetti
- Written by: Giovanni Bognetti
- Produced by: Roberto Sessa; Maurizio Totti; Alessandro Usai
- Starring: Diego Abatantuono; Angela Finocchiaro; Andrea Pisani; Michela Giraud
- Cinematography: Federico Masiero
- Edited by: Danilo Torchia
- Music by: Corrado Carosio; Pierangelo Fornaro
- Production companies: Warner Bros Entertainment Italia; Pico Media; Colorado Film
- Distributed by: Warner Bros. Pictures
- Release date: 3 August 2022 (Italy)
- Running time: 90 minutes
- Country: Italy
- Language: Italian

Il mammone is a 2022 Italian comedy film directed by Giovanni Bognetti.

The film is a remake of the 2001 French film Tanguy.

== Cast ==
- Diego Abatantuono as Piero Bonelli
- Angela Finocchiaro as Anna Bonelli
- Andrea Pisani as Aldo Bonelli
- Michela Giraud as Amalia
- Uccio De Santis as Antonio
- Emmanuele Aita as Peppe
- Antea Olivieri as Aurora
- Debora Villa as Marisa
- Federica Cifola as Mara
- Gaia Benassi as Elena
- Alla Krasovitzkaya as Nina
