= Angelo Pintus =

Italian comedian and actor (born 1975)

- Pintus in 2024
- Born: 21 May 1975 (age 51); Trieste, Italy
- Occupations: Comedian, actor, television presenter
- Years active: 2000–present

Angelo Pintus (born 21 May 1975) is an Italian comedian, actor and television presenter. He became widely known through his appearances on the Italian comedy show Colorado and developed a career in stand-up comedy, television and theatre.

== Life and career ==
Born in Trieste to a Sardinian father and a mother of Ligurian origin, Pintus began his career working as an entertainer in tourist resorts. In 2000, he formed a comedy duo with Max Vitale and appeared on several Italian television programmes, also winning the competition Stasera mi butto in 2007.

Pintus gained wider recognition in 2009, when he joined the cast of the television comedy programme Colorado. His performances featured stand-up monologues and impressions of famous people. He toured Italian theatres with shows such as 50 sfumature di Pintus and Ormai sono una MILF.

In 2014, he made his film debut in Paolo Ruffini's comedy Tutto molto bello and then appeared in Neri Parenti's What's Your Sign?. In February 2015, Pintus made his debut at the Sanremo Music Festival as a guest comedian during the second evening, hosted by Carlo Conti. His performance included a tribute to the victims of the Charlie Hebdo attack in Paris.

In 2021, Pintus began a collaboration with Amazon Prime Video, appearing as a contestant in the first season of LOL - Chi ride è fuori and starring in the sitcom Before Pintus. The platform also released recordings of several of his earlier live shows, including Pintus Forum (2015), Pintus Arena (2016) and Pintus Ostia Antica (2018). He released further comedy specials on the service, including Pintus Club (2021), Pintus Taormina (2022), and Nabana (2026). In 2025 and 2026, he was the co-host of LOL - Chi ride è fuori alongside Alessandro Siani.

In 2025, he starred in Fausto Brizzi's comedy film Where Storks Dare.

== Filmography ==
Film
Year	Title	Role
2014	Tutto molto bello	Serafino
2014	What's Your Sign?	Bruno Quagliarullo
2016	On Air – Storia di un successo	Taxi driver
2025	Where Storks Dare	Angelo

Television
Year	Title	Role	Notes
2012	Colorado: 'Sto classico	Poseidon / Gandalf	Episodes "The Odyssey" and "The Lord of the Rings"
2012	Camera Café		Episode "Baby Monitor"
2018–2019	Idol × Warrior Miracle Tunes!	Demon	Main role
2021	Before Pintus	Angelo	Lead role

== Television ==
- Stasera mi butto (Rai 1, 2007)
- Colorado (Italia 1, 2009–2015)
- Quelli che... il calcio (Rai 2, 2010–2011)
- Pintus Forum (Italia 1, 2015; Prime Video, 2021)
- Karaoke (Italia 1, 2015) – host
- Pintus Arena (Italia 1, 2016; Prime Video, 2021)
- Pintus Ostia Antica (Italia 1, 2018; Prime Video, 2021)
- LOL - Chi ride è fuori (Prime Video, 2021, 2025–2026) – contestant in 2021; host in 2025–2026
- Before Pintus (Italia 1 and Prime Video, 2021)
- Pintus Club (Italia 1 and Prime Video, 2021)
- Pintus Christmas (Prime Video, 2021)
- Pintus Taormina (Prime Video, 2022)
- LOL Talent Show: Chi fa ridere è dentro (Prime Video, 2023) – judge
- La conferenza stampa (RaiPlay, 2023)
- Avanti un altro! By Night (Canale 5, 2025) – guest
- Only Fun – Comico Show (Nove, 2026)
- Comedy Match (Nove, 2026)
- Nabana (Prime Video, 2026)
