= Gianluca Fubelli =

Italian comedian and actor (born 1973)

- Fubelli in 2014
- Born: 9 April 1973 (age 53); Rome, Italy
- Occupations: Comedian, actor, television presenter
- Years active: 1998–present
- Spouse: Federica Camba (m. 2023)

Gianluca Fubelli (born 9 April 1973), also known by his stage name Scintilla, is an Italian comedian, actor and television presenter. Born in Rome, he began his career performing in tourist resorts before becoming a member of the comedy group I Turbolenti.

Fubelli has appeared in Italian television comedy programmes, including Colorado, House of Gag and Only Fun: Comico Show. His film appearances include L'ultimo crodino (2009) and Tutto molto bello (2014). In 2025, he participated in the twelfth season of Pechino Express. In 2026, he won the sixth season of the comedy game show LOL - Chi ride è fuori.

Since 2023, Fubelli has been married to Italian singer-songwriter Federica Camba.

== Filmography ==
Film
Year	Title	Role	Notes
2006	Really SSSupercool: Chapter Two	AC Milan supporter	
2009	L'ultimo crodino	Scintilla	
2012	Area Paradiso	Romeo	Television film
2013	Una notte agli studios	Various	
2014	Tutto molto bello	Eros	
2015	Milano trema ancora: la giustizia ha le ore contate	Policeman	
2022	Din Don: Un paese in due	Don Lorenzo	Television film

Television
Year	Title	Role	Notes
2008–2013	Life Bites – Pillole di vita	Waiter	
2008	Don Luca c'è	Crucifix	12 episodes
