= Mayhem (film) =

- Theatrical release poster
- Directed by: Joe Lynch
- Written by: Matias Caruso
- Produced by: Parisa Caviani; Mehrdad Elie; Buddy Enright; Lawrence Mattis; Matt Smith; Sean Sorensen; Andjelija Vlaisavljevic
- Starring: Steven Yeun; Samara Weaving; Steven Brand; Caroline Chikezie; Kerry Fox; Dallas Roberts; Nina Senicar; Jovana Prosenik
- Cinematography: Steve Gainer
- Edited by: Josh Ethier
- Music by: Steve Moore
- Production companies: Circle of Confusion; Royal Viking Entertainment
- Distributed by: RLJE Films
- Release date: November 10, 2017
- Running time: 86 minutes
- Country: United States
- Language: English
- Budget: $2.5 million
- Box office: $17,366

Mayhem is a 2017 American action comedy horror film directed by Joe Lynch and written by Matias Caruso. The film was released at the South by Southwest Film Festival in March 2017, and The Sales art and poster was released at the Cannes Film Festival in May 2017. It was released in US cinemas and on VOD and digital HD on November 10, 2017, through RLJE Films.

== Plot ==
The ID-7 "Red Eye" virus spreads throughout the world. It is not lethal, but it infects neural pathways, removing all inhibition and moral integrity, resulting in people acting out their darkest impulses, which may include murder. A man named Nevil Reed commits the first known case of murder driven by ID-7, but he is not deemed liable due to the virus's influence. Derek Cho, a Towers and Smythe Consulting (TSC) lawyer, found the loophole that won Reed's case, earning him a corner office. Derek began his job full of optimism but quickly lost his moral compass while climbing the corporate ladder, even neglecting his family.

One morning, Derek goes into work and meets with Melanie Cross, a desperate client who needs more time on a loan. Derek thinks that he cannot help and calls security on her. After discovering that a bungled legal case for massive company Vanda Corp. has been pinned on him by his superior, Kara "The Siren" Powell, Derek confronts her. They plead their cases to TSC's head, John Towers, who eventually orders Derek fired. Human resource chief Lester "The Reaper" McGill offers a hefty severance package in return for Derek claiming responsibility. Derek, afraid of being disbarred and sued, rejects this, so security begins escorting Derek out.

The building is put under quarantine as the ID-7 virus has been detected in the ventilation system. A neutralizing agent is released into the building, and it takes an estimated eight hours for the virus to be obliterated. However, everyone in the building is infected in the meantime, resulting in chaos, violence, and sex.

Derek attempts to take the elevator upstairs to protest to Towers and the board of directors for his job back. Instead, Towers sends Derek to the basement to be beaten up by Towers' enforcer, Colton "The Bull" Snyder. Derek's friend Ewan arrives to help but is accidentally killed by The Bull, further infuriating Derek.

Derek is locked up along with Melanie, who had resisted security. They quarrel but eventually decide to work together. Derek calls Vanda Corp., ensuring his innocence in the mishandled case and costing TSC a payment from Vanda Corp. Realizing that they will not be liable for their actions, Derek and Melanie grab weapons, intending to hold the people on the top floor responsible for their respective bad situations, but they require The Reaper's and Kara's key cards to get there. Derek takes out two security guards who have been sent to attack them.

En route to The Reaper, Derek incapacitates two more guards. The Reaper attacks them; Melanie kills him with a power saw. Derek and Melanie use his card to get to Kara's office. They duel and brutalize five of Kara's coworkers. Kara offers her card for her safety, but her long-suffering assistant Meg has already destroyed it, having been offered a promotion to do it to protect those upstairs. Meg cuts out The Siren's tongue and kills her. Towers taunts Derek by urinating on Ewan's corpse. Melanie comforts Derek, and they have sex.

Needing another method to get upstairs, Derek and Melanie convince the company's one IT worker to hack Irene Smythe's computer, getting her to come down. They offer Smythe's files in exchange for her card and a reversal of her original denial of Melanie's loan extension. Smythe refuses, stating that contracts signed during this period can be invalidated, citing the virus. Melanie destroys Smythe's files. The Bull attacks Derek but is killed with a screwdriver. Smythe offers Derek top-floor access in exchange for revenge on Melanie. Derek accepts but sabotages Melanie's restraints. Melanie escapes and kills Smythe with a hammer.

On the top floor, Towers offers Derek a full partnership, but Derek refuses. Derek kills Towers' assistants, Tessa and Dena, who attacked him. Derek battles Towers. TSC's board gives him permission to kill Towers, so Derek punches him off the building to his death just as the quarantine is lifted.

Derek accepts the board's offer of Towers' job. He extends Melanie's loan, then promptly quits the company and is later seen painting with Melanie.

== Cast ==
- Steven Yeun as Derek Cho
- Samara Weaving as Melanie Cross
- Steven Brand as John "The Boss" Towers
- Caroline Chikezie as Kara "The Siren" Powell
- Kerry Fox as Irene Smythe
- Dallas Roberts as Lester "The Reaper" McGill
- Mark Frost as Ewan Niles
- Claire Dellamar as Meg
- André Eriksen as Colton "The Bull" Snyder
- Nikola Kent as Oswald
- Lucy Chappell as Jenny
- Olja Hrustic as CDC Official
- Bojan Peric as Miles
- Annamaria Serda as Brenda
- Nina Senicar as Tessa
- Jovana Prosenik as Dena
- Joe Lynch as Ray the IT Guy (uncredited)

== Production ==
Mayhem was filmed in Belgrade, Serbia, in March 2016 over 25 days. Joe Lynch explained in an interview the decision came down to cost, saying that "we had to find a place that would give us the most days to shoot. We went first to Pittsburgh and they said 15 days. Then we went to New Orleans and they said 17 days. Then we tried Vancouver and they said 18 days. But it was not enough time". Serbia was also the filming location of his previous film, Everly.

== Reception ==
On Rotten Tomatoes, the film has a rating of 84%, based on reviews from 58 critics, with an average score of 7.22/10. The website's critical consensus reads: "Mayhem delivers stylish violence by the bloody bucketful—and grounds all the titular chaos in sharp humor and surprisingly effective real-world economic angst". On Metacritic, the film has a score of 62 out of 100, based on reviews from 13 critics, indicating "generally favorable reviews".

Joe Leydon of Variety called it "A smartly constructed and sardonically funny indie with attitude that somehow manages the tricky feat of being exuberantly over the top even as it remains consistently on target". Richard Roeper of the Chicago Sun-Times wrote: "Joe Lynch's fantastically creative, subversive and Tarantino-esque Mayhem stands alone as an entertainingly bloody and dark and twisted social satire—but it's even more satisfying for those of us who loved Steven Yeun's Glenn on The Walking Dead".

== See also ==
- Tarantinoesque film
