= Tosca D'Aquino =

Italian actress, comedian, and television presenter (born 1966)

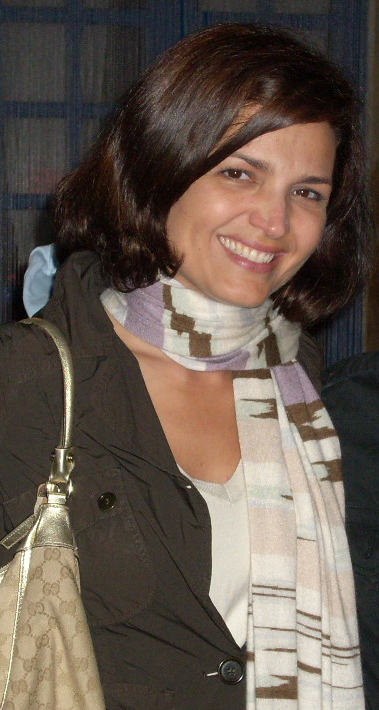
- D'Aquino in 2008
- Born: 10 June 1966 (age 60); Naples, Italy
- Occupation: Actress

Tosca D'Aquino (born 10 June 1966) is an Italian actress, comedian and television presenter.

== Life and career ==
Born on 10 June 1966, in Naples, Tosca D'Aquino started her career at age 15, appearing in several local television shows. At nineteen years old she moved in Rome to pursue an acting career, and there she enrolled at the Accademia Nazionale di Arte Drammatica Silvio D'Amico. In 1986, she was cast in the popular Saturday night show Fantastico, then in 1988 she made her film debut in Rimini Rimini - Un anno dopo. While being quite active in films, usually in comedic roles, her popularity is mainly linked to television, notably to the RAI Saturday night show Torno Sabato, she co-hosted alongside Giorgio Panariello in the early 2000s.

== Selected filmography ==
- Street Kids (1989)
- Paganini (1989)
- Captain Fracassa's Journey (1990)
- Black Holes (1995)
- The Graduates (1995)
- The Cyclone (1996)
- Il cielo in una stanza (1999)
- Amore a prima vista (1999)
- Padre Pio: Miracle Man (2000)
- John XXIII: The Pope of Peace (2002)
- Christmas in Love (2004)
- Torno a vivere da solo (2008)
- Amore che vieni, amore che vai (2008)
- Ex 2: Still Friends? (2011)
- Anita Garibaldi (2012)
- Buona giornata (2012)
- The Bastards of Pizzofalcone (2017)
- Un weekend artificiale (2026)
