= I'm Back (film) =

- Directed by: Luca Miniero
- Screenplay by: Luca Miniero; Nicola Guaglianone
- Based on: Look Who's Back by David Wnendt
- Produced by: Marco Cohen; Fabrizio Donvito; Benedetto Habib
- Starring: Massimo Popolizio; Frank Matano; Stefania Rocca; Gioele Dix; Alessandro Cattelan; Enrico Mentana; Eleonora Belcamino
- Cinematography: Guido Michelotti
- Edited by: Valentina Mariani
- Music by: Pasquale Catalano
- Distributed by: Vision Distribution
- Release date: 1 February 2018 (Italy)
- Running time: 100 minutes
- Country: Italy
- Language: Italian

I'm Back (Italian: Sono tornato) is a 2018 Italian satirical black comedy film about Benito Mussolini directed by Luca Miniero, based on the German film Look Who's Back, in turn based on the satirical novel of the same name. The film includes unscripted vignettes of ordinary Italians interacting with Massimo Popolizio (in-character as Benito Mussolini), interspersed among scripted scenes.

== Plot ==
In 2017 Rome, Benito Mussolini (Massimo Popolizio) falls from the sky, landing in front of the Alchemical Door. As he wanders through the city, disoriented and believing it still to be 1945, he interprets modern situations and things from a Fascist perspective. Asking for information, nobody believing him to be the real Mussolini, he's in the end pepper sprayed by a scared woman and starts to feel dizzy. Before passing out, he arrives at a newspaper kiosk owned by a gay couple and is able to read the date, discovering that it is 2017, on the front page of a journal. He's then hosted at the kiosk for a while by the couple, despite Mussolini making some homophobic comments, and here he starts to read about modern Italy through journals.

Meanwhile, filmmaker Andrea Canaletti (Frank Matano) is fired by the television station MyTV, for which he was filming a movie in front of the Alchemical Door, and despondently decides to watch the movie he had been filming for MyTV when he sees Mussolini in the background. He decides to search for him in the hope of getting his job back; after some time, he is able to find him.

Canaletti and others believe Mussolini to be just a comedy actor, and he and Mussolini agree to travel together across Italy, Canaletti wishing to make a documentary that may lead him to success, while Mussolini wants to assay the Italians' mood in the hope of one day returning to power.

While they are traveling, Mussolini begins to question and interact with Italians while he is filmed by Canaletti, but then there is an argument between them when Mussolini shoots a dog with a concealed pistol due to it being "English". Despite this, Canaletti decides to continue the documentary with him.

The duo gather a lot of interest and acclaim in a short time, and finally, due to Mussolini's continuing growth in popularity and his ideas becoming accepted by more people, the ambitious Katia Bellini (Stefania Rocca), the new chairman of MyTV, decides to create a new television show dedicated to the dictator.

The show becomes a boon to both Mussolini – who continues to gather popularity and even catches the attention of foreign media - and to Canaletti, who is soon rehired and promoted. Only a few people openly criticize Mussolini's fanatical populist rhetoric and the media circus created by it, as MyTV employees caution in vain against celebrating the character that much for the sake of their show business.

Soon, things begin to go wrong for the two: a MyTV executive discovers the unedited footage of Mussolini shooting the dog during his travels with Canaletti and, out for revenge against Bellini for subverting his authority, airs it during a television debate of Mussolini with Enrico Mentana. This ruins the careers of Mussolini, Canaletti and Bellini.

Without dwellings or employment, Canaletti and Mussolini move, for the time being, to the house of Canaletti's girlfriend Francesca (Eleonora Belcamino), whom Canaletti was aided in seducing by Mussolini. There, Francesca's grandmother (Ariella Reggio), who survived the Raid of the Ghetto of Rome, has an argument with Mussolini; disgusted by Mussolini's ideas, Canaletti decides to distance himself from him.

Outside alone at night, Mussolini gets violently beaten up by a group of masked men. At first, it appears to have been a group of animal rights activists acting in retaliation for the shooting of the dog, but the incident is then revealed to have been orchestrated by Bellini, to shift popularity from MyTV's rival TV station. Mussolini falls in love with her because she reminds him of his mistress, Claretta Petacci.

In the meantime, Canaletti rewatches the recordings he made before he met Mussolini, and in them notices the supposed comedian falling from the sky. Upon returning to that location, he links the occurrence to the legend of a door between the worlds of the living and of the dead, and concludes that the "comedian" is none other than the real Mussolini.

Taking advantage of the beating incident, Bellini manages to organize another show with Mussolini and regains wealth and success. Canaletti, however, steals a pistol from a policeman and bursts into the television studio while Mussolini's show is being filmed. He unsuccessfully tries to convince people that the man they think to be an actor is actually the real Duce. He continues to threaten Mussolini but, even though he has the opportunity to kill him, decides in the end to not shoot him because he doesn't want to lower himself to his level. Canaletti is then arrested.

Completely rehabilitated by Italians, Mussolini is pardoned by the dog's owner on live television. As the film ends, it appears he is on the way to successfully using his charisma, his popularity and the media to retake political power in Italy.

== Cast ==
- Massimo Popolizio as Benito Mussolini
- Frank Matano as Andrea Canaletti
- Stefania Rocca as Katia Bellini
- Gioele Dix as Daniele Leonardi
- Eleonora Belcamino as Francesca
- Ariella Reggio as grandmother Lea
- Massimo De Lorenzo as Giorgio
- Giancarlo Ratti as Mario Capogrossi
- Gugliemo Favilla as the television author
- Luca Avagliano as Gianni
- Daniela Airoldi as Laura
- Alessandro Cattelan as himself
- Enrico Mentana as himself
- Piera Russo as Carla

== Production ==
The film was filmed on different Italian locations as Rome, Naples, Milan, Florence and in Umbria.

== Distribution ==
The film was released in Italy on February 1, 2018, and was distributed by Vision Distribution.

== Box office and reception ==
The film received some comments by movie critics focused on the reflection brought seeing the movie about an hypothetical return of Mussolini and Fascism in Italy. For example, Boris Sollazzo of Rolling Stone said "[The film tells us] how much the current world is fascist, hypothesizes how Benito Mussolini, in 2018, would be accepted. Triumphantly. Like all national populists after him. And now".

Luca Cardarelli of Cinematik said that the hardness of some scenes is a plot device used to make the viewer indignant, to encourage it to a "serious reflection on today's Italian civil society and media-driven society and on the actual risks of a "What if story".

Maria Teresa Ruggiero of Universal Movies said "Luca Miniero never reveals a judgment on the figure of Mussolini, he shows it as a mask, a character that fits perfectly in the television lounge, as it happens with the participants of a reality show. "Sono tornato" seems to be more a reflection of the media parable, of how they are used today and how, the public, even forgive killing of dogs through a TV-truth mechanism".

For Paola Casella of MyMovies the film lost the opportunity to be more critical towards Fascism and said "Sono tornato aired a month from the vote and is clearly intended as a pre-election warning. But its potential effectiveness, as comic as it is pedagogical, is thwarted by the choice (...) of never facing Fascist ideology in its danger, nor in its ridiculous component, to focus on the figure of a man who expresses himself for famous phrases: phrases that, taken out of context, can appear as pearls of wisdom. (...) In this way it is neither an antidote to History that repeats itself, nor a ridicule of certain "tummy reasoning" so popular in our day. It is not even politically incorrect enough to really make people laugh, limiting ourselves to painting our age as more confused than amoral, more solitary than egocentric, more tenderly nostalgic than tenaciously reactionary. Which, on the eve of the elections, is at least questionable".

Raffaele Meale of Quinlan instead lamented the mediocrity of the plot and of the scenes, in particular a scene filmed inside of a Neo-Fascist circle of Rome and said "Sono tornato can not handle the heretical and comic potential at the same time inherent in the project, and moreover chooses positions to say the least embarrassing, as the clearance of a phantom neo-fascist party (CasaPound? Forza Nuova? Who knows, maybe a mix between the two components) in whose headquarters Matano and Popolizio go as if they could be part of a democratic path of the nation".

For Mariarosa Mancusa of Il Foglio the movie is "quite depressing" especially because of the lack of gags in the second part of the movie and said "Benito Mussolini wins his television show, and boasts a remarkable following of Italians "when he was there" (trains arrived on time, Italy was respected, we had the land in the sun). They are not all nostalgic, at some age does not even allow it. They are convinced that the problems of today's Italy are identical to those of the time, and that only the strong man can solve them. Ready to take a selfie, to try a Roman salute, to be moved by a dead dog more than for the racial laws".

The film in the first two weeks after the release grossed 2.2 million euros and was listed for a Nastro d'argento and after The Post and Maze Runner: The Death Cure was the third-highest-grossing film on 1 February 2018 in Italy.
