= Nina Seničar =

Serbian actress and model

- Нина Сеничар
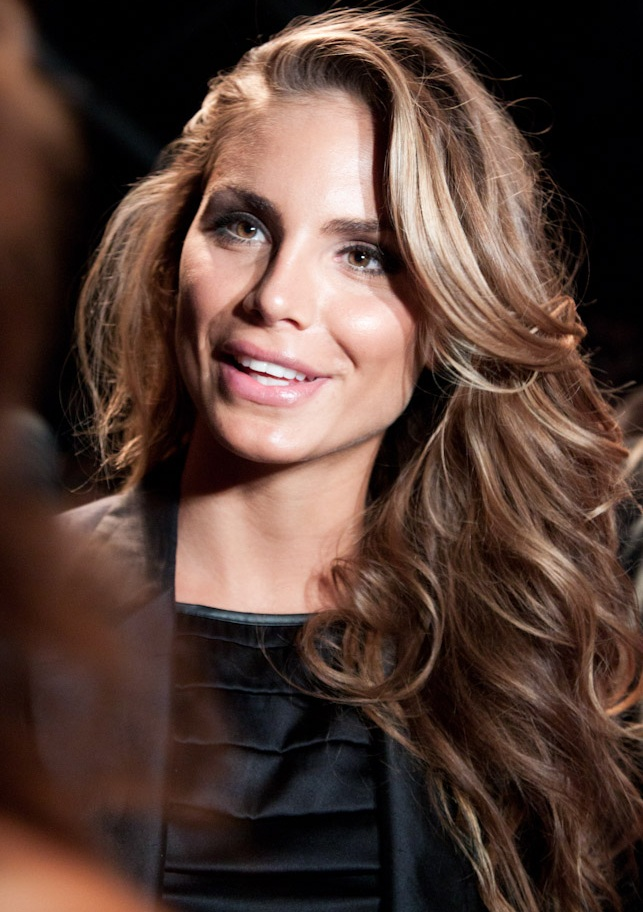
- Seničar in 2010
- Born: 11 November 1985 (age 40); Novi Sad, SR Serbia, SFR Yugoslavia
- Education: Bocconi University (MS)
- Occupations: Actress; model
- Years active: 2010–present
- Spouse: Jay Ellis (m. 2022)
- Children: 2

Nina Seničar (Serbian Cyrillic: Нина Сеничар; born 11 November 1985) is a Serbian actress and model based in Los Angeles. She has appeared in Hollywood movies such as Papillon (2017) and Mayhem (2017), as well as numerous Italian film and television productions.

== Early life and education ==
Seničar was born on 11 November 1985 in Novi Sad, Serbia. She started acting at the age of 14 while in her high school drama club. In 2001, she earned the title of National Champion in show jumping and was subsequently invited to join the national team. When she was 18 years old, Seničar won a full scholarship to study at Bocconi University in Milan. She graduated with a Master of Science degree in International Economics and Management in Arts, Culture, Media and Entertainment. She later moved to the United States to study acting with Susan Batson.

== Career ==
=== International career ===
She began her career as a model and television presenter, appearing on Italian television. She has acted in the sitcom Camera Café, hosted the talent show Velone, and been a celebrity contestant on the program L'isola dei famosi. Seničar starred in several Italian features such as the 2016 film Una nobile causa, the 2014 film Tutto molto bello, and the 2013 film Otto e Mezza. She also appeared in the films Napoletans (2011), Dark Resurrection - Volume 0 (2011), and Compulsions (2016).

In 2017, Seničar starred in the Serbian film Prokleti pas and had a role in the 2018 film Apsurdni eksperiment.

Seničar starred in the 2018 film Cafe Con Leche, shot in Mexico City.

=== Hollywood career ===
In 2017 and 2018, Seničar appeared in a number of films including Papillon and Mayhem, as well as doing voice work on Arctic Dogs. She was also part of the credited cast of the 2017 film DriverX. Prior to that, she had a role in the 2016 film Shortwave and appeared in a 2015 episode of the television show The Librarians.

== Personal life ==
Seničar has been in a relationship with American actor Jay Ellis since 2015. On November 8, 2019, she gave birth to their daughter Nora. On July 9, 2022, they married in Italy. On 11 July 2024 their son Noa was born.

Seničar speaks English, Italian, and Serbian. She is involved with the international humanitarian organization Pangea Onlus, which assists women who are victims of violence.

== Awards ==
In 2011, Seničar won the Best New Actress award at the Milano Film Festival.

== Filmography ==
- 2019 Arctic Dogs (feature)
- 2018 Aigaio SOS (feature)
- 2018 Doe (feature)
- 2018 The Downside of Bliss (feature)
- 2018 Apsurdni eksperiment - The Absurd Scam (feature)
- 2018 Cafe Con Leche (feature)
- 2018 La Guadalupana (in production)
- 2017 Papillon (feature)
- 2017 Mayhelm (feature)
- 2017 DriverX (feature)
- 2017 Prokleti pas - The Fucking Dog (feature)
- 2017 Written On My Skin (film short)
- 2017 La Gamba (film short)
- 2016 Compulsion (feature)
- 2016 Shortwave (feature)
- 2016 Una nobile causa (feature)
- 2014 Match (web series)
- 2014 Tutto molto bello (feature)
- 2014 The Librarians (TV series)
- 2013 Otto e Mezza (feature)
- 2011 Napoletans (feature)
- 2011 Camera Café (TV series)
- 2011 Dark Resurrection Volume 0 (film short)
- 2010 L'isola dei famosi (TV series)
