= Francesco Facchinetti =

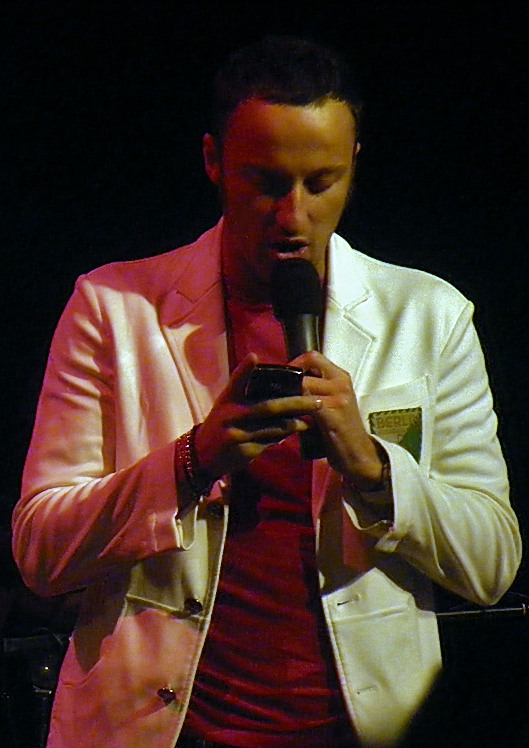
- Facchinetti in 2009

Background information
- Also known as: Francesco, DJ Francesco, Oz
- Born: Francesco Facchinetti; 2 May 1980 (age 46); Milan, Italy
- Genres: Pop; hip hop; EDM; house
- Occupations: Musician; disc jockey; producer; television presenter; radio personality
- Instruments: Vocals; guitar; piano; turntables; Ableton Live
- Years active: 2003–present
- Labels: Universal Music Italy; Sony BMG

Francesco Facchinetti (Italian pronunciation: [franˈtʃesko fakkiˈnetti]; born 2 May 1980), also known as Dj Francesco or as Oz, is an Italian musician, disc jockey, producer, and television personality. He rose to fame as a singer during the summer of 2003, when he released his debut single, "La canzone del capitano", which became a commercial success in Italy. Before retiring from his music career in 2007, he released three studio albums, and he competed in the Sanremo Music Festival three times. He is the founder of Italian EDM trio "We Are PresidentS".

In 2004, he was also a contestant of the Italian reality show L'isola dei famosi. Three years later, he co-hosted the show. From 2008, Facchinetti presented the first four series of X Factor, the Italian version of the talent show created by Simon Cowell in the United Kingdom. When RAI decided to discontinue the show, Facchinetti presented Star Academy, which replaced X Factor. Together with his father Roby Facchinetti, he was part of a duo coach on the third series of talent show The Voice of Italy. He was one of the Italian commentators for the second and third seasons of Netflix's Ultimate Beastmaster alongside Bianca Balti.

== Early life ==
Francesco Facchinetti was born in Milan on 2 May 1980, to Italian singer Roby Facchinetti, better known as a member of the pop band Pooh, and Rosaria Longoni. His elder sister, Alessandra Facchinetti, is a fashion designer.

== Career ==
=== Music debut and Bella di padella ===
After becoming part of a punk band, Facchinetti became a presenter of the Italian satellite television channel Hit Channel 102.5, directed by the record producer and talent scout Claudio Cecchetto. The jingle for his TV programme, "La canzone del capitano", was also used during Canale 5's quiz show Passaparola. After being released as his debut single under the pseudonym DJ Francesco, "La canzone del capitano" became a hit in Italy, peaking at number three on the FIMI Singles Chart for four consecutive weeks and being certified gold.

His second single, "Salta", became another top 20 hit in Italy. In October of the same year, DJ Francesco received a nomination for Best Italian Revelation of the Year at the fourth Italian Music Awards. Facchinetti's third single, "Ti adoro", a rap version of Luciano Pavarotti's song with the same title, was released in February 2004. In March of the same year, DJ Francesco competed in the 54th Sanremo Music Festival with the song "Era bellissimo", placing 11th in a field of 22. The song was included in his first studio album, Bella di padella, also including DJ Francesco's previous singles, released in March 2004.

=== L'isola dei famosi and Il mondo di Francesca ===
In September 2004, DJ Francesco became a contestant of the reality show L'isola dei famosi. In March 2005, he competed for the second time in the Sanremo Music Festival, performing the song "Francesca" as part of the DJ Francesco Band. The song compteded in the category Groups, but it was eliminated after the second round of the competition. The song became the lead single from DJ Francesco's second studio album, Il mondo di Francesca. In the meanwhile, Facchinetti debuted as a voice actor, dubbing Rodney in the Italian version of the animated film Robots.

=== The third studio album and the debut as a TV presenter ===
In 2006, Facchinetti started to present his own radio programme, Non esco, c'è Francesco, broadcast by RTL 102.5. On 16 June of the same year he released his first single for Sony Music, "Non cado più", under the mononym Francesco. The single, presented during the singing competition Festivalbar, was certified gold in Italy.

In February 2007, Facchinetti competed in the 57th Sanremo Music Festival, performing the song "Vivere normale", a duet with his father Roby Facchinetti. The song placed eighth in a field of twenty, and was later included in Francesco's third studio album of the same title. The album also spawned the singles "Amante e regina" and "Superman".

On 27 June 2007, Facchinetti presented the 2nd Venive Music Awards, an award ceremony celebrating pop music. In September of the same year, he started to co-present the fifth series of L'isola dei famosi, from the Cayos Cochinos islands, in Honduras. As a result, he received the Premio Regia Televisiva, also known as Oscar TV, for TV Personality Revelation of the Year in March 2008.

=== X Factor, Star Academy and Rai Boh ===
In March 2008, Facchinetti became the presenter of the first series of the Italian talent show X Factor. Facchinetti also presented the following three series of the show. In the meanwhile, Facchinetti also presented the music show Scalo 76, the Italian Nickelodeon Kids' Choice Awards 2008, and Il più grande (italiano di tutti i tempi). In 2011, when Rai 2 decided not to confirm X Factor replacing it with Star Academy, Facchinetti was chosen as the presenter of the new show. During the same year, he presented the music-based show Ciak si canta with Belén Rodríguez.

In 2012, Facchinetti founded a dance trio, We Are presidents. The band's first single, "Hello World", was released in November 2012. In January 2013, Facchinetti presented a new late night show, Rai Boh, which experimented with chaos-based interviews.

=== Braccialetti rossi soundtrack and The Voice of Italy ===
In 2014, Facchinetti returned to music, performing the song "Conta" for the Italian drama television series Braccialetti rossi. The song was released as a single in February of the same year. He also recorded the theme song for the second series of the same show, "L'inizio del mondo", a duet with Niccolò Agliardi, released as a single in 2015.

During the spring of 2015, Facchinetti was chosen as part of a duo coach for the third series of Italian talent show The Voice of Italy, together with his father Roby Facchinetti. Father and son won the program.

== Personal life ==
During the reality show L'isola dei famosi, Facchinetti started an on-again off-again relationship with fellow contestant and Venezuelan television personality Aída Yéspica. Their relationship lasted until July 2006. In August 2010, Facchinetti started dating Italian TV presenter Alessia Marcuzzi. On 4 September 2011, Marcuzzi gave birth to their first daughter, Mia Facchinetti. On 9 October 2012, Alessia Marcuzzi and Francesco Facchinetti announced their separation through a co-written official message posted on their Facebook and Twitter official accounts. On 11 December 2014 Facchinetti married his Lebanese Brazilian girlfriend Wilma Helena Faissol. Their son Leone was born in October 2014. In March 2016, the couple's daughter Lavinia Angelica Catherine was born.

Facchinetti has worn the brands Adidas and Plein, promoting them into the Italian press.

On 17 October 2021, mixed martial artist Conor McGregor allegedly attacked Facchinetti without provocation, in a nightclub in Rome, breaking Facchinetti's nose. Facchinetti is planning to sue McGregor for the unprovoked attack.

== Discography ==
=== Studio albums ===
List of albums, with chart positions and certifications
Title	Album details	Peak chart positions	Certifications
Title	Album details	ITA	Certifications
Bella di padella	Released: 2004; Label: Universal; Formats: 2× CD	47	
Il mondo di Francesca	Released: 2005; Label: Universal; Formats: CD	36	
Vivere normale	Released: 2007; Label: Sony BMG; Formats: CD, download	80	

=== Singles ===
List of singles, with chart positions and certifications in Italy
Single	Year	Peak chart positions	Certifications	Album
Single	Year	ITA	Certifications	Album
"La canzone del capitano"	2003	3	FIMI: Gold	Bella di padella
"Salta"	2003	20		Bella di padella
"Ti adoro" (Vs. Luciano Pavarotti)	2004	24		Bella di padella
"Era bellissimo"	2004	28		Bella di padella
"La mia polka"	2004	50		Bella di padella
"Francesca"	2005	13		Il mondo di Francesca
"Ridere ridere"	2005	—		Il mondo di Francesca
"Il panettiere"	2005	—		Il mondo di Francesca
"Non cado più"	2006	13	FIMI: Gold	Vivere normale
"Vivere normale" (with Roby Facchinetti)	2007	—		Vivere normale
"Amante e regina"	2007	—		Vivere normale
"Superman"	2007	—		Vivere normale
"Conta"	2014	—		Braccialetti rossi (soundtrack)
"L'inizio del mondo"	2015	—		Braccialetti rossi 2 (soundtrack)
"—" denotes singles that did not chart

== Filmography ==
=== Film ===
Year	Title	Role	Notes
2005	Robots	Rodney Copperbottom	Italian voice
2011	Hop	C.P.	Italian voice
2015	Belli di papà	Loris Maggi	
2015	Thomas & Friends: Sodor's Legend of the Lost Treasure	Narrator	Italian voice
2016	I babysitter	Inspector Masuelli	
2018	Amici come prima	Himself	Cameo appearance
2019	Wonder Park	Steve	Italian voice
2023	RH+	Himself	Documentary

=== Television ===
Year	Title	Role	Notes
2004	L'isola dei famosi	Himself / Contestant	Reality show (season 2)
2005	Striscia la notizia	Himself / Co-host	Satire program (season 17)
2007	L'isola dei famosi	Himself / Reporter	Reality show (season 5)
2007–2009	Quelli che... il calcio	Himself / Reporter	Variety show (season 15-16)
2008–2010	X Factor	Himself / Host	Italian version of The X Factor (season 1-4)
2008	Nickelodeon Italian Kids' Choice Awards	Himself / Host	Annual cerimony
2009	Inspector Coliandro	Alex D	Episode: "Il sospetto"
2010	Il più grande italiano di tutti i tempi	Himself / Host	Variety show
2011	Ciak, si canta!	Himself / Host	Talent show (season 3)
2011	Star Academy	Himself / Host	Italian version of the Spanish format
2011	Ti lascio una canzone	Himself / Judge	Talent show (season 5)
2013	Fuga dalla morte	Deejay	Episode: "Tre anni prima"
2014–2015	Thomas & Friends	Narrator	Italian voice (seasons 18-19)
2015	The Voice of Italy	Himself / Coach	Italian version of The Voice (season 3)
2016–2018	Miss Italia	Himself / Host	Annual beauty contest
2017	Eccezionale veramente	Himself / Host	Talent show (season 2)
2017	Sanremo Giovani 2017	Himself / Judge	Newcomers' selection competition for the Sanreo Music Festival 2018
2020–2023	Il cantante mascherato	Himself / Judge	Italian version of The Masked Singer
2023	Non sono una signora	Himself / Contestant	Drag talent show
2023	People from Cecchetto	Himself	Special
2023	Pooh – Un attimo ancora	Himself	Television movie; cameo
2025	San Marino Song Contest 2025	Himself / Host	San Marino selections' for the Eurovision Song Contest
