= List of 2024 box office number-one films in Italy =

The following is a list of 2024 box office number-one films in Italy.

== Number-one films ==
†	This implies the highest-grossing movie of the year.

#	Weekend end date	Film	Gross	Notes	Ref.
1	7 January 2024	Succede anche nelle migliori famiglie	€2,102,840		
2	14 January 2024	The Boy and the Heron	€1,026,023		
3	21 January 2024	Pare parecchio Parigi	€1,335,227		
4	28 January 2024	Poor Things	€1,989,973		
5	4 February 2024	Poor Things	€1,845,452		
6	11 February 2024	Poor Things	€1,124,255		
7	18 February 2024	Past Lives	€854,526		
8	25 February 2024	Bob Marley: One Love	€1,207,885		
9	3 March 2024	Dune: Part Two	€3,026,372		
10	10 March 2024	Dune: Part Two	€2,111,247		
11	17 March 2024	Dune: Part Two	€1,020,447		
12	24 March 2024	Kung Fu Panda 4	€3,474,314		
13	31 March 2024	Kung Fu Panda 4	€2,529,409		
14	7 April 2024	A World Apart	€1,309,537		
15	14 April 2024	Ghostbusters: Frozen Empire	€881,131		
16	21 April 2024	Back to Black	€789,096		
17	28 April 2024	Challengers	€1,240,263		
18	5 May 2024	Challengers	€792,510		
19	12 May 2024	Kingdom of the Planet of the Apes	€961,934		
20	19 May 2024	IF	€755,403		
21	26 May 2024	Furiosa: A Mad Max Saga	€694,585		
22	2 June 2024	Me contro Te – Il film: Operazione spie	€985,840		
23	9 June 2024	Me contro Te – Il film: Operazione spie	€486,089		
24	16 June 2024	Bad Boys: Ride or Die	€838,911		
25	23 June 2024	Inside Out 2 †	€12,792,412	Inside Out 2 had the highest weekend debut of 2024. It also became the highest grossing film of the year in its first weekend.	
26	30 June 2024	Inside Out 2 †	€6,680,300		
27	7 July 2024	Inside Out 2 †	€3,929,146		
28	14 July 2024	Inside Out 2 †	€1,695,194	Inside Out 2 is the first animated film to gross over €40 million in Italy.	
29	21 July 2024	Inside Out 2 †	€1,134,269		
30	28 July 2024	Deadpool & Wolverine	€4,856,643		
31	4 August 2024	Deadpool & Wolverine	€2,624,836		
32	11 August 2024	Deadpool & Wolverine	€1,163,445		
33	18 August 2024	Alien: Romulus	€902,874		
34	25 August 2024	Despicable Me 4	€3,705,834		
35	1 September 2024	Despicable Me 4	€2,395,920		
36	8 September 2024	Despicable Me 4	€2,014,308		
37	15 September 2024	Despicable Me 4	€1,077,242		
38	22 September 2024	Despicable Me 4	€753,743		
39	29 September 2024	Despicable Me 4	€429,238	Despicable Me 4 was the first film since There's Still Tomorrow to top the box office for six consecutive weekends.	
40	6 October 2024	Joker: Folie à Deux	€3,874,557		
41	13 October 2024	The Wild Robot	€1,351,353		
42	20 October 2024	The Wild Robot	€1,614,701	The Wild Robot was the first film since There's Still Tomorrow to see an increase on its second weekend.	
43	27 October 2024	Venom: The Last Dance	€847,686		
44	3 November 2024	Venom: The Last Dance	€1,963,339		
45	10 November 2024	Terrifier 3	€1,291,959		
46	17 November 2024	Gladiator II	€3,695,262		
47	24 November 2024	Gladiator II	€2,123,904		
48	1 December 2024	Moana 2	€7,224,210		
49	8 December 2024	Moana 2	€4,055,651		
50	15 December 2024	Moana 2	€1,947,288		
51	22 December 2024	Mufasa: The Lion King	€4,508,364		
52	29 December 2024	Mufasa: The Lion King	€6,773,368	Mufasa: The Lion King had the highest second weekend gross since 2019's The Lion King. Diamonds by Ferzan Özpetek had the year's highest weekend gross for an Italian production with €3,3 million.	

== Highest-grossing films of 2024 ==
Highest-grossing films of 2024 (In-year release)
Rank	Title	Distributor	Domestic gross
1.	Inside Out 2	Disney	€46,503,218
2.	Moana 2	Disney	€19,118,936
3.	Deadpool & Wolverine	Disney	€18,074,174
4.	Despicable Me 4	Universal	€17,694,953
5.	Mufasa: The Lion King	Disney	€13,539,206
6.	Kung Fu Panda 4	Universal	€11,659,032
7.	Dune: Part Two	Warner Bros.	€10,060,688
8.	Gladiator II	Eagle Pictures	€9,585,183
9.	Poor Things	Disney	€9,285,982
10.	The Boy with Pink Pants	Eagle Pictures	€9,062,955

== See also ==
- List of 2023 box office number-one films in Italy
- 2024 in Italy

Preceded by 2023 Box office number-one films	Box office number-one films 2024	Succeeded by 2025 Box office number-one films
