= I Hate Christmas =

Italian romantic comedy television series (2022–2023)

- Italian: Odio il Natale
- Genre: Romantic comedy
- Based on: Home for Christmas
- Written by: Elena Bucaccio; Viola Rispoli; Silvia Leuzzi
- Directed by: Davide Mardegan; Clemente De Muro
- Starring: Pilar Fogliati; Beatrice Arnera; Fiorenza Pieri; Massimo Rigo; Sabrina Paravicini; Simonetta Solder; Glen Blackhall; Alan Cappelli Goetz; Alessio Praticò; Cecilia Bertozzi; Marzia Ubaldi; Nicolas Maupas
- Country of origin: Italy
- Original language: Italian
- No. of seasons: 2
- No. of episodes: 12

Production
- Executive producers: Daniele Passani; Corrado Trionfera
- Producers: Matilde Bernabei; Luca Bernabei
- Running time: 28–39 minutes
- Production company: Lux Vide

Original release
- Network: Netflix
- Release: December 7, 2022 – December 7, 2023

I Hate Christmas (Italian: Odio il Natale) is an Italian romantic comedy television series based on the Norwegian series Home for Christmas. It was first released on Netflix on 7 December 2022.

== Plot ==
Gianna is a nurse from Chioggia who is happily single but determined to avoid the usual questioning about her love life during the holidays, so she devises a plan to find a boyfriend to take home for Christmas.

== Cast ==
=== Main ===
- Pilar Fogliati as Gianna
- Beatrice Arnera as Titti
- Fiorenza Pieri as Margherita
- Massimo Rigo as Pietro
- Sabrina Paravicini as Marta
- Simonetta Solder as the caposala
- Glen Blackhall as Umberto
- Alan Cappelli Goetz as Diego
- Alessio Praticò as Mario
- Cecilia Bertozzi as Caterina

=== Recurring ===
- Marzia Ubaldi as Matilde Castoldi
- Nicolas Maupas as Davide
- Marco Rossetti as Carlo
- Marcos Piacentini as Thomas
- Gabriele Falsetta as Patrizio
- Giovanni Anzaldo as Nicola
- Giorgia Boscolo Todaro as Lisa
- Riccardo Boscolo Todaro as Giacomo
- Federico Calistri as Giulio
- Raniero Monaco di Lapio as Francesco
- Andrea Di Stefano as Dante Crisanti
- Raffele Esposito as Genny
- Gabriella D'Este as Gabriella
- Luigi Gallo as Guido
- Giulia Gonella as Silvia
- Astrid Meloni as Nina

== Episodes ==
=== Series overview ===
Series	Episodes	Originally released
1	6	7 December 2022
2	6	7 December 2023

=== Season 1 ===
No. overall	No. in season	Title	Duration	Original release date
1	1	"The Big Christmas Lie" (La grande bugia di Natale)	31 min	7 December 2022
2	2	"Bicycles" (Biciclette)	36 min	7 December 2022
3	3	"You're Special" (Tu sei speciale)	29 min	7 December 2022
4	4	"Perspectives" (Punti di vista)	28 min	7 December 2022
5	5	"The Party's Over" (La festa è finita)	28 min	7 December 2022
6	6	"Like a Nativity Scene" (Come in un presepe)	39 min	7 December 2022

=== Season 2 ===
No. overall	No. in season	Title	Duration	Original release date
7	1	"Queen Christmas" (La regina del Natale)	32 min	7 December 2023
8	2	"Anyone Will Do" (Uno qualunque)	32 min	7 December 2023
9	3	"Everyone but Me" (Tutti tranne me)	33 min	7 December 2023
10	4	"Onwards and Upwards" (Avanti tutta)	35 min	7 December 2023
11	5	"A Guarded Heart" (Cuore in formaldeide)	29 min	7 December 2023
12	6	"Santa's Sleigh" (La slitta di Babbo Natale)	35 min	7 December 2023

== Production ==
The series was filmed in Chioggia, Venice, and Susegana. It was renewed for a second season in February 2023.
