= Belli di papà =

- Theatrical release poster
- Directed by: Guido Chiesa
- Written by: Giovanni Bognetti; Guido Chiesa
- Story by: Gary Alazraki; Patricio Saiz; Adrian Zurita
- Produced by: Maurizio Totti; Alessandro Usai
- Starring: Diego Abatantuono; Andrea Pisani; Matilde Gioli; Francesco Di Raimondo; Marco Zingaro; Barbara Tabita; Antonio Catania; Francesco Facchinetti
- Cinematography: Federico Masiero
- Music by: Andrea Farri
- Distributed by: Medusa Film
- Release date: 29 October 2015
- Running time: 100 minutes
- Country: Italy
- Language: Italian

Belli di papà (transl. Beautiful from dad) is a 2015 Italian comedy film co-written and directed by Guido Chiesa and starring Diego Abatantuono. It is a loose remake of the Mexican comedy film The Noble Family.

== Plot ==
The wealthy businessman Vincenzo, originally from Apulia, realizes that he is a father too absent, but also that his two sons and 1 daughter are spoiled and unable to support themselves economically. So Vincenzo stages their fraudulent bankruptcy, and runs with their children in Taranto, in his old house. The boys are struggling to settle, but Vincenzo is confident about them and hopes that they will soon find a job in the city, though humble and poor. Meanwhile, an impostor blackmailer, who wants to marry the daughter of Vincenzo, arrives in Puglia, to expose the scam.

== Cast ==
- Diego Abatantuono as Vincenzo Liuzzi
- Matilde Gioli as Chiara
- Andrea Pisani as Matteo
- Francesco Di Raimondo as Andrea
- Antonio Catania as Giovanni Guida
- Francesco Facchinetti as Loris Dettori Maggi
- Marco Zingaro as Rocco
- Uccio De Santis as Luca
- Valeria Perri as Serena
- Nicolò Senni as Carlo
- Barbara Tabita as Anna
- Nicola Nocella as Ferdinando

== See also ==
- List of Italian films of 2015
