= Some Say No =

2011 film

- Film poster
- Directed by: Giambattista Avellino
- Written by: Fabio Bonifacci; Giambattista Avellino
- Starring: Luca Argentero; Paola Cortellesi; Paolo Ruffini; Myriam Catania; Claudio Bigagli; Marco Bocci; Roberto Citran; Giorgio Albertazzi
- Cinematography: Roberto Forza
- Music by: Pivio and Aldo De Scalzi
- Production company: Cattleya
- Distributed by: Universal Pictures International
- Release date: 8 April 2011
- Running time: 95 minutes
- Country: Italy
- Language: Italian

Some Say No (Italian: C'è chi dice no) is a 2011 Italian comedy film directed by Giambattista Avellino.

== Cast ==
- Luca Argentero as Max
- Paola Cortellesi as Irma
- Myriam Catania as Enza Giannotti
- Paolo Ruffini as Samuele
- Giorgio Albertazzi as Barone De Rolandis
- Claudio Bigagli as Leo Fenaroli
- Marco Bocci as Pino Conca
- Roberto Citran as Edmondo Giannotti
- Massimo De Lorenzo as Crocetta
- Isabelle Adriani
- Chiara Francini as Mara De Rolandis
- Edoardo Gabbriellini as Saguatti
