= Paolo Fox =

Italian astrologer and journalist (born 1961)

- Born: 5 February 1961 (age 65); Rome
- Occupations: astrologer, journalist, television personality
- Height: 1.78 m (5 ft 10 in)

Paolo Fox (born 5 February 1961 in Rome) is an Italian astrologer, journalist, and television personality.

== Biography ==
Paolo Fox has been studying astrology since he was 16. Starting from 1997 he has continuously developed his horoscopes for Lattemiele radio station; he also starred in some radio programs of Rai Radio 1, Rai Radio 2, and Radio DeeJay.

He began his appearances on a national Italian television in Per tutta la vita and gained broad success in In bocca al lupo!, thanks to his new style in presenting horoscopes and astrology. He has been a regular guest on many programs of Rai 1 and Rai 2 since 2007.

Since 1998 every year in late December he has been the main guest on programs of RAI dealing with astrological predictions for the new year. Since the early years 2000 he has been writing his horoscopes for national Italian magazines; he also wrote some bestseller books about astrology.
