= Madly (2025 film) =

2025 comedy film

- Directed by: Paolo Genovese
- Screenplay by: Isabella Aguilar; Lucia Calamaro; Paolo Costella; Flaminia Gressi
- Produced by: Carlotta Galleni; Raffaella Leone; Andrea Leone
- Starring: Pilar Fogliati; Edoardo Leo; Emanuela Fanelli; Maria Chiara Giannetta; Claudia Pandolfi; Vittoria Puccini; Marco Giallini; Maurizio Lastrico; Rocco Papaleo; Claudio Santamaria
- Cinematography: Fabrizio Lucci
- Edited by: Consuelo Catucci
- Music by: Maurizio Filardo
- Distributed by: 01 Distribution
- Release date: 20 February 2025
- Running time: 97 minutes
- Country: Italy
- Language: Italian

Madly (Italian: Follemente, graphically rendered as FolleMente) is a 2025 Italian romantic comedy film directed by Paolo Genovese. It was a box-office success, grossing €17 million in the domestic market, becoming the second highest-grossing film in Italy in 2025.

== Plot ==
After meeting in a bar, Piero and Lara set up their first date at her place. Both are ready to get back into the dating scene: Lara is a 35-year-old furniture restorer who just ended a relationship with a married man and often falls for dead-end romances. Piero is a 50-year-old high school teacher, recently divorced with joint custody of his young daughter, and still carries the scars of past heartbreaks.

The two protagonists are guided by their respective personalities: Piero listens to the advice of the rational Professor, the romantic Romeo, the passionate Eros, and the disillusioned Valium. Lara is led by the uncompromising Alfa, the seductive Trilli, the wild Scheggia, and the dreamy Giulietta.

The evening starts well, despite internal squabbles within their emotional groups, with awkward moments, slips of the tongue, and mishaps. Ultimately, the date goes well, and the two protagonists find the right chemistry, ending up in bed together, much to the delight of not only themselves but also their various personalities who successfully guided them to this happy milestone.

Late at night, Piero says goodbye to Lara, neither of them suggesting they spend the night together. However, he turns back, and after a direct conversation between their respective personalities, the two cook something together: the adventure continues.

== Cast ==
- Edoardo Leo as Piero
- Pilar Fogliati as Lara
- Emanuela Fanelli as Trilli
- Maria Chiara Giannetta as Scheggia
- Claudia Pandolfi as Alfa
- Vittoria Puccini as Giulietta
- Marco Giallini as Professore
- Maurizio Lastrico as Romeo
- Rocco Papaleo as Valium
- Claudio Santamaria as Eros

== Production ==
The film was produced by Lotus Production and Rai Cinema, in collaboration with Disney+ and in association with Vice Pictures. Principal photography started in Rome on 30 September 2024. The cast presented the film in a segment of the 75th Sanremo Music Festival.

== Release ==
The film was released in Italian cinemas by 01 Distribution on 20 February 2025.

== Reception ==
With €3,958,917 grossed during its first weekend, Madly marked the best grossing debut for an Italian film since after the 2020 COVID-19 pandemic. It topped the Italian box office for four weeks in a row.
