= Giovanni Bognetti (director) =

Italian film director and screenwriter

- Born: Milan, Italy
- Occupation(s): Film director, screenwriter

Giovanni Bognetti is an Italian film director and screenwriter.

== Career ==
Born in Milan, he worked for several years in advertising and marketing before moving into television productions. He made his directorial debut in 2006 with the short film Le impronte della tartaruga. Bognetti wrote the story and screenplays for various comedies, collaborating with directors Paolo Ruffini, Alessandro Genovesi, and Guido Chiesa.

In 2016, he directed his first feature film, the comedy I babysitter. In 2022, he was the director and screenwriter of the films Il mammone and The Price of Family, the latter for Netflix. In 2024, he directed and wrote The Price of Nonna's Inheritance, a sequel to The Price of Family, also for Netflix.

== Filmography ==
=== As director ===
- I babysitter (2016)
- Il mammone (2022)
- The Price of Family (2022)
- The Price of Nonna's Inheritance (2024)

=== As writer ===
- Marriage and Other Disasters (2010)
- Area Paradiso (2012)
- Fuga di cervelli (2013)
- Tutto molto bello (2014)
- What a Beautiful Surprise (2015)
- Belli di papà (2015)
- I babysitter (2016)
- My Big Gay Italian Wedding (2018)
- Ti presento Sofia (2018)
- When Mom Is Away (2019)
- Cambio tutto! (2020)
- Il mammone (2022)
- The Price of Family (2022)
- 50 km/h (2024)
- The Price of Nonna's Inheritance (2024)
- When Mom Is Away... With the In-laws (2025)
