= Marta Zoboli =

Italian actress and comedian (born 1978)

- Born: 10 April 1978 (age 48); Treviglio, Lombardy, Italy
- Occupations: Actress; comedian
- Years active: 2006–present

Marta Zoboli (born 10 April 1978) is an Italian actress and comedian, best known for her performances on the television show Zelig, where she appeared alongside Gianluca De Angelis in popular speed-dating sketches. Alongside her cabaret career, she has worked as a film actress, starring in the 2025 comedy Where Storks Dare.

== Life and career ==
Zoboli was born in Treviglio, in the province of Bergamo, Lombardy. She graduated in modern languages and literature from the University of Bergamo before pursuing acting studies in Milan and at the École Philippe Gaulier in Paris. She continued her training through workshops with acting coach John Strasberg in Milan and New York. From 2006 to 2009, she performed with an international theatre company at festivals and theatres across Europe.

After returning to Italy, Zoboli worked in theatre with Paolo Rossi and appeared in productions including A Midsummer Night's Dream, directed by Gioele Dix. She made her television debut on Zelig Off in 2010 alongside Gianluca De Angelis and Gianmarco Pozzoli, as part of the comedy trio Sagapò. Following Pozzoli's departure in 2012, Zoboli and De Angelis continued as the duo Marta e Gianluca, becoming known for their comedy sketches on Zelig. The duo also appeared at the Sanremo Music Festival in 2015 and 2016.

As a television performer, Zoboli has appeared on Quelli che il calcio, Saturday Night Live from Milano, Un'ora sola vi vorrei, Only Fun: Comico Show and Comedy Match. She made her film debut in 2015 with Tutte lo vogliono, directed by Alessio Maria Federici.

In 2025, Zoboli landed her first leading role in Fausto Brizzi's comedy Where Storks Dare. Later that year, she competed in the fifth season of LOL - Chi ride è fuori on Amazon Prime Video. In 2026, she starred in Leonardo Pieraccioni's comedy film Un weekend artificiale.

== Filmography ==
Film
Year	Title	Role	Notes
2015	Tutte lo vogliono	Marta	Film debut
2021	Mollo tutto e apro un chiringuito	Bibi	
2023	Domino 23		
2025	Where Storks Dare	Marta	Lead role
2026	Un weekend artificiale		

Television series
Year	Title	Role	Notes
2020	Tutta colpa di Freud		
2019	Scatola nera	Marta Lotti	
2026	Super Market	Anita	Main role

== Television ==
Year	Title
2010	Zelig Off
2011–2016	Zelig
2015	Sanremo Music Festival 2015
2016	Sanremo Music Festival 2016
2018	Saturday Night Live from Milano
2019	Comedy Central Tour
2021–2022	Un'ora sola vi vorrei
2022–2025	Only Fun: Comico Show
2024–present	Comedy Match
2025	LOL - Chi ride è fuori
