= 30 notti con il mio ex =

2025 film

- Directed by: Guido Chiesa
- Screenplay by: Guido Chiesa; Nicoletta Micheli
- Produced by: Alessandro Usai
- Starring: Edoardo Leo; Micaela Ramazzotti
- Cinematography: Emanuele Pasquet
- Edited by: Luca Gasparini; Angelo Santini
- Music by: Francesco Cerasi
- Release date: 17 April 2025
- Language: Italian

30 notti con il mio ex (lit. '30 nights with my ex') is a 2025 Italian romantic comedy film co-written and directed by Guido Chiesa and starring Edoardo Leo and Micaela Ramazzotti.

== Cast ==
- Edoardo Leo as Bruno
- Micaela Ramazzotti as Terry
- Gloria Harvey as Emma
- Claudio Colica as Paolo
- Francesca Valtorta as Camilla
- Matteo Scattaretico as Lorenzo
- Luca Massaro as Natale
- Beatrice Arnera as Adriana
- Andrea Pisani as Roberto
- Anna Bonaiuto as Angela

== Production ==
The film is a loose remake of the 2022 Argentine film 30 noches con mi ex by Adrián Suar. It was produced by PiperFilm and Colorado Film, in collaboration with Netflix.

== Release ==
The film was released in Italian cinemas by PiperFilm on 17 April 2025.

== Reception ==
The film received two Nastro d'Argento nominations, for best actor and best actress in a comedy film (Leo and Ramazzotti) and for best original song ("L'avresti detto mai" by Malika Ayane).
