= Paolo Ruffini (actor) =

Italian actor and presenter

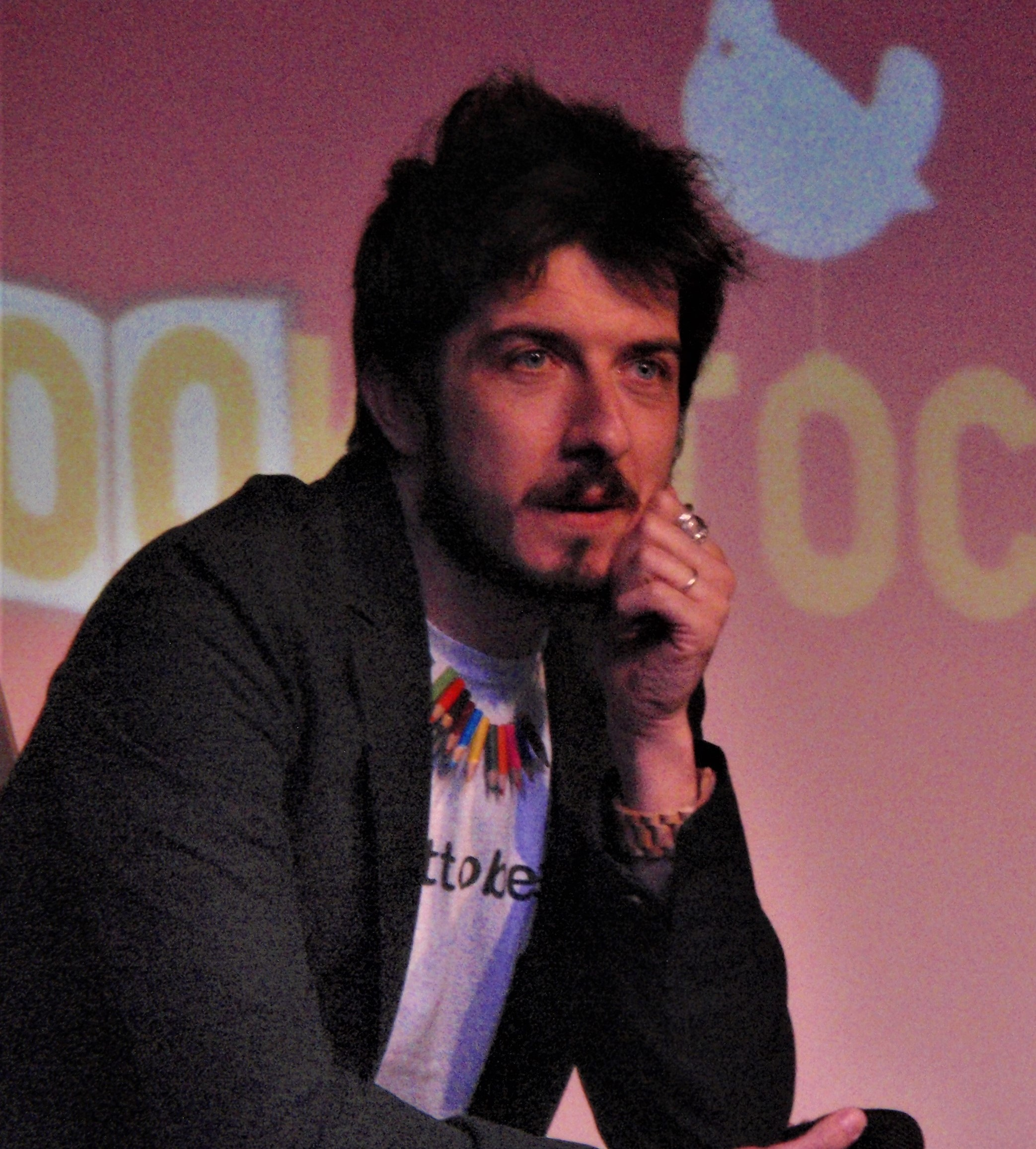
- Ruffini in 2013
- Born: 26 November 1978 (age 47); Livorno, Italy
- Occupations: Actor; film director; television presenter; author
- Years active: 1997–present
- Website: PaolinoRuffini.it

Paolo Ruffini (born 26 November 1978) is an Italian actor, film director and television presenter.

== Life ==
Ruffini was born in Livorno, Italy. He made his debut in show business by participating in commercials and in Paolo Virzì's film Ovosodo, in which he played the role of a disliked classmate of the main character. For several years he worked as an animator in many vacation villages.

Passionate about cinema, in 2001 he founded the cinema association Nido del Cuculo, with which he organizes events, festivals, film festivals (including the Joe D'Amato Horror Festival dedicated to Joe D'Amato), produces documentaries, plays (among all Io Doppio) and musicals in which he often plays the role of actor and author.

In 2002 he won the Cercasi VJ contest on MTV. For more than three years he hosts programs such as MTV on the beach, Hitlist Italia, MTV Mobile Chart and Select. In 2005 he leaves the music network and starts to collaborate with Marco Giusti. He participates in the demential talk show Bla Bla Bla with Lillo & Greg. In the same year, again with Marco Giusti, he figures as the author of Stracult, on Rai 2, during which he interviews authors and actors such as John Woo, Donald Sutherland and Barbara Bouchet.

In 2005 he participated in Neri Parenti's Natale a Miami; in 2006 he repeated with Natale a New York. In 2007 he became the frontman for the channel Comedy Central of the MTV Italia group. In 2008 he participated in the theatrical show Portamitanterose.it, created by Maurizio Costanzo and Enrico Vaime. In the same year he is in the cast of Natale a Rio; in 2009 he is among the leads in Carlo Vanzina's film Un'estate ai Caraibi, with Gigi Proietti. He was later part of the cast of Paolo Virzì's The first beautiful thing.

In 2010 he co-stars with Luca Argentero and Paola Cortellesi the comedy directed by Giambattista Avellino C'è chi dice no. The same year he is also on stage with the musical 80 voglia di...'80! directed by Fabrizio Angelini. Later he is one of the protagonists of two parallel movies by the director and screenwriter Fausto Brizzi: Men vs. Women and Women vs. Men.

In September 2011 he leads on Italia 1 the comedy program Colorado together with Belén Rodríguez, being confirmed for the next 5 editions. At the same time, Ex 2 - Still friends?, directed by Carlo Vanzina, is released in cinemas. In 2013 he made his directorial debut with Fuga di cervelli, one of the most viewed Italian films in 2013, which grossed more than 5.5 million euros.

From February to April 2014 he stars in the musical Cercasi Cenerentola together with Manuel Frattini. In October the film Tutto molto bello was released where he is director and actor alongside Frank Matano. From February 2015 he returns to host Colorado, this time together with Diana Del Bufalo. At the end of the year he stars in the cinepanettone Natale col boss together with Lillo & Greg and Francesco Mandelli.

In 2016 he voices the character of Yax for the Italian version of the Disney film Zootropolis. He is also at the cinema as an actor in the film I babysitter by Giovanni Bognetti with Francesco Mandelli and Andrea Pisani. Then he renews his collaboration with Filmauro for the cinepanettone Natale a Londra – Dio salvi la regina, with Lillo & Greg and Nino Frassica.

In 2017 he is the director of the docufilm Resilience, inspired by the true story of Alessandro, a victim of a very serious pediatric cancer. In October he appears in the video clip for In The Town, a single by Sergio Sylvestre and Gabry Ponte. In the same year he curated Super vacanze di Natale, a montage film that celebrates 35 years of cinepanettone through its most famous scenes. He also returns to dubbing in Despicable me 3 where he lends his voice to Balthazar Bratt.

In 2018 he is Puck in A Midsummer Night's Dream directed by Massimiliano Bruno, which also features Violante Placido and Stefano Fresi. In March 2018, he made his theater debut with the comedy happening UP&Down, accompanied by disabled actors; the show toured all the major Italian theaters for two years, and from that experience came the documentary UP&Down - Un film normale, which Ruffini co-directed with Francesco Pacini. The film won the Kineo award at the 75th Venice Film Festival. As for cinema, in 2018 he is in the cast of Volfango De Biasi's L'agenzia dei bugiardi, a funny comedy that is a box office success.

In 2019, he is the star and screenwriter of Fausto Brizzi's film Modalità aereo. On TV he is host of the reality show La pupa e il secchione e viceversa, a TV format brought back to screens after years. He also returns to present Colorado with Belén Rodríguez.

In February 2022 he returned to cinema with PerdutaMente, a docufilm on Alzheimer's directed with Ivana Di Biase. For artistic merit, he was presented with the Quiliano Cinema Award. In 2023, he is director of the theatre shows of Casa Abis and Ginevra Fenyes, digital talents supported by Vera S.r.l., his production company.

He also directed a series of commercials for Mediaset Infinity, starring Max Angioni.

== Personal life ==
Paolo Ruffini has been married to actress Claudia Campolongo from 2007 to 2013. He considers himself Roman Catholic.

== Filmography ==
- Ovosodo (1997)
- Natale a Miami (2005)
- Natale a New York (2006)
- Non c'è più niente da fare (2007)
- La seconda volta non si scorda mai (2008)
- Natale a Rio (2008)
- Un'estate ai Caraibi (2009)
- Sleepless (2009)
- The First Beautiful Thing (2010)
- Men vs. Women (2010)
- Women vs. Men (2011)
- Some Say No (2011)
- Ex 2: Still Friends? (2011)
- Pinocchio (2012, voice)
- Fuga di cervelli (2013, also writer and director)
- Tutto molto bello (2014, also writer and director)
- Natale col Boss (2015)
- I babysitter (2016)
- Natale a Londra – Dio salvi la regina (2016)
- Resilienza (2017)
- Super vacanze di Natale (2017)
- Up & Down - Un film normale (2018)
- Un nemico che ti vuole bene (2018)
- L'agenzia dei bugiardi (2019)
- Modalità aereo (2019)
- PerdutaMente (2021)
- Rido perché ti amo (2022)
- Ragazzaccio (2022)

== Television programs ==
- MTV Select (MTV, 2002)
- MTV On the Beach (MTV, 2002)
- MTV Club Generation (MTV, 2003)
- MTV Mobile Chart (MTV, 2004)
- Hitlist Italia (MTV, 2004)
- Bla Bla Bla (Rai Due, 2005)
- Fear Factor (GXT, 2005)
- Stracult (Rai Due, 2005–2008)
- Matinée (Rai Due, 2006–2007)
- Soirée (Rai Due, 2007)
- Amici miei (Comedy Central, 2007)
- Scalo 76 (Rai Due, 2007–2009)
- Voglia d'aria fresca (Rai Uno, 2010)
- Se... a casa di Paola (Rai Uno; 2010)
- Colorado (Italia 1, 2011–2013, 2015, 2017–2019)
- 2013 - Un anno da paura (Rai Due, 2013)
- Vecchi bastardi (Italia 1, 2014)
- David di Donatello (Rai Movie - Rai Uno, 2014)
- Eccezionale veramente (La7, 2016–2017)
- Premio Persefone (Rete 4, 2017–2018)
- Up&Down (Italia 1, 2018–2020)
- La pupa e il secchione e viceversa (Italia 1, 2020)
- Paolo Ruffini Diversity Show (Comedy Central, 2021)

== Theater ==
- Dé Rocky Horror picture show (2003–2011)
- Io? doppio! (from 2004)
- Portamitanterose.it (2008)
- 80 voglia...di 80! (2009)
- Rent. No day but today (2010)
- Tre cuori in affitto (2012)
- Colorado Tour (2012)
- Full monty - Il musical (2013)
- Cercasi Cenerentola (2014–2015)
- Paolo Ruffini Show (2015)
- Un grande abbraccio (2016)
- Sogno di una notte di mezza estate (2017)
- Up&Down (from 2018)
- Quasi amici (from 2023)
- Casa Abis (from 2023)
- Cono o Coppetta? (from 2023)
