= Yotobi =

Italian YouTuber

- Born: Karim Musa; August 4, 1988 (age 38); Monopoli, Apulia, Italy
- Occupations: YouTuber; stand-up comedian

Twitch information
- Channel: yotobi
- Years active: 2010–present
- Genres: Gaming; just chatting; entertainment
- Followers: 400,000

YouTube information
- Channels: Yotobi; Secondo Canale di Yotobi; YotobiGames
- Years active: 2006–present
- Genres: Comedy; talk show; entertainment
- Subscribers: 1.54 million
- Last updated: 26 June 2025

Karim Musa (born August 4, 1988), better known by his online pseudonym Yotobi, is an Italian YouTuber known for his humorous reviews of low-budget films. Over the years, he has expanded his content with entertainment formats such as Late Show con Karim Musa and live streaming projects.

== Biography ==
Karim Musa was born in Monopoli to an Italian mother and an Iraqi father. At the age of three, he moved with his family to Turin. After graduating as a surveyor, he opened his YouTube channel in October 2006, uploading his first video, a clip from Scrubs titled Sad moment from Scrubs, after which he began posting amateur comedy sketches and video game footage.

In 2008, inspired by the success of channels like The Angry Video Game Nerd and Nostalgia Critic, he decided to create review videos in Italian. He initially focused on old video games like E.T. and Deadly Towers, but later shifted to his passion for cinema, specialising in reviews of B movies. His videos covered a range from Italian films like Amore 14 and Alex l'ariete to international productions including Mega Shark vs. Giant Octopus, other films by The Asylum, and cult titles such as Birdemic: Shock and Terror, gaining popularity and establishing himself as a leading figure in the Italian YouTube community. Yotobi opened two additional YouTube channels; by 2016, his third channel, dedicated to gaming, had over half a million subscribers.

Yotobi has been described as giving the impression of a "likeable next-door nerd", with effective, straightforward humour and an air of consistent genuineness and humility. His early reviews featured "top 5 worst things" lists and were often improvised, but over time became more structured, with improved cinematography. A hallmark example of this new style is his review of Albakiara - Il film, which garnered over three million views and featured 175 separate shots, reflecting the fast-paced, jump-cut-heavy editing style typical of YouTube film and TV series reviews.

In 2013, Yotobi decided to stop making reviews and launched a new format called Mostarda, based on comedy monologues. The first episode, a monologue about the film Fuga di cervelli, became quite successful, garnering nearly two million views and making it the most viewed video of the year among Italian YouTubers. In 2015, Yotobi embarked on a stand-up comedy tour across Italy alongside fellow YouTuber VKlabe. The following year, his main channel surpassed one million subscribers, and his review of The Lady web series was nominated for the 2015 Web Show Awards. A video from 2016 recounting the story of a viral animated GIF featuring him as the unknowing protagonist is described as a rare example of a viral phenomenon narrated in the first person by one of its subjects.

In 2016, he discontinued Mostarda and launched The Late Show con Karim Musa, inspired by the American program Late Show with David Letterman. The first two seasons mainly featured monologues with occasional guest appearances due to limited studio space. From the third season onwards, the format shifted to resemble Letterman's original Late Show, with a different guest in each episode. The programme received positive reviews, while remaining a niche product. In 2017, one of his videos expressed disenchantment with YouTube, describing it as "fifteen minutes of fame multiplied by ten years". From 2019, he focused on live streaming, with most of his new content published on Twitch.

In 2022, he was among the speakers at TEDx in Barletta. The same year, he co-hosted the official Twitch live coverage of Lucca Comics & Games. Also in 2022, during the Lucca Film Festival retrospectives, a documentary titled Yotobi è Karim Musa was presented, produced by the Slim Dogs collective. In 2023, he presented Fuori Menù on the YouTube channel of Netflix Italia, where he humorously reviewed the platform's content.
