= Where Storks Dare =

2025 Italian comedy film directed by Fausto Brizzi

- Italian: Dove osano le cicogne
- Directed by: Fausto Brizzi
- Written by: Gianluca Belardi; Fausto Brizzi; Herbert Simone Paragnani; Angelo Pintus
- Produced by: Filippo Cipriano; Attilio De Razza; Nicola Picone
- Starring: Angelo Pintus; Marta Zoboli; Beatrice Arnera; Andrea Perroni
- Cinematography: Marcello Montarsi
- Edited by: Luciana Pandolfelli
- Music by: Andrea Bonini
- Distributed by: PiperFilm
- Release date: 1 January 2025 (Italy)
- Running time: 105 minutes
- Country: Italy
- Language: Italian

Where Storks Dare (Italian: Dove osano le cicogne) is a 2025 Italian comedy film directed by Fausto Brizzi and written by Brizzi, Gianluca Belardi, Herbert Simone Paragnani and Angelo Pintus. The film stars Pintus, Marta Zoboli, Beatrice Arnera and Andrea Perroni.

== Cast ==
- Angelo Pintus as Angelo
- Marta Zoboli as Marta
- Beatrice Arnera as Luce
- Andrea Perroni as Andrea
- Tullio Solenghi as the colonel
- Maria Amelia Monti as the doula
- Antonio Catania as the school principal
- Imma Piro as Patrizia

== Release ==
The film was released in Italian cinemas on 1 January 2025.
