= Beatrice Arnera =

Italian actress and comedian (born 1995)

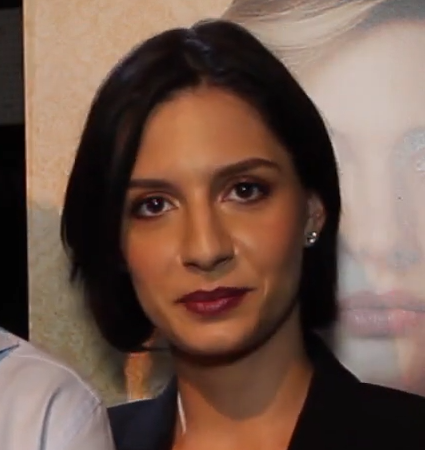
- Arnera in 2018
- Born: 31 July 1995 (age 31); Acqui Terme, Italy
- Occupations: Actress, comedian, singer
- Years active: 2014–present

Beatrice Arnera (born 31 July 1995) is an Italian actress and comedian.

== Career ==
Daughter of the opera singer Silvia Gavarotti, Arnera spent her early years traveling with her mother on tour across Italy and Europe. She moved to Rome at the age of seventeen and began working in the entertainment industry, participating with small roles in various television and film projects.

Arnera starred in the Jackal's first feature film Addio fottuti musi verdi in 2017 and in the comedy My Big Gay Italian Wedding in 2018.

In 2018, she starred as the lead Giuly in the Fox series Romolo + Giuly: La guerra mondiale italiana, a parody of the Shakespearean tragedy Romeo and Juliet, that depicts the class struggle between Northern and Southern Rome. That same year, she was awarded with the Kinéo Award for the Best Young Revelation at the 76th Venice International Film Festival.

From 2022 to 2023, Arnera has been starring in the Netflix series I Hate Christmas.

== Personal life ==
From 2021 to 2025, Arnera was in a relationship with Andrea Pisani from the comedy duo PanPers. In 2024, the couple had a daughter named Matilde.

== Filmography ==
Film
Year	Title	Role	Notes
2016	Tini: The Movie	Miranda	
2017	Noi eravamo	Agnese Pavan	
2017	Addio fottuti musi verdi	Matilda	
2017	Non c'è campo	Flavia Giuliani	
2018	My Big Gay Italian Wedding	Camilla Fonteggi	
2022	Quel posto nel tempo	Michela	
2023	Tre di troppo	Caterina	
2024	Sinapsi	Anna	
2025	Where Storks Dare	Luce	
2025	30 notti con il mio ex	Adriana	
2026	Amici comuni	Veronica	
2026	Cena di classe	Nanè	
2026	Scuola di seduzione	Adele	
2026	Un tranquillo funerale di famiglia	Stefania	

Television
Year	Title	Role	Notes
2014	Una grande famiglia		TV series
2015	The Ladies' Paradise	Claudia De Angelis	TV series; 2 episodes
2015	Lontana da me	Giulia	TV series; 6 episodes
2017	Inspector Montalbano	Alina Camera	TV series; episode "A Nest of Vipers"
2017	Solo per amore	Giulia Testa	TV series; 3 episodes
2018–2019	Romolo + Giuly: La guerra mondiale italiana	Giuly Copulati	TV series; main role
2019	Un passo dal cielo	Valeria Ferrante	TV series; main role
2021	Ridatemi mia moglie	Emma	TV miniseries; 2 episodes
2021–2023	Buongiorno, mamma!	Agata Scalzi	TV series; main role
2022–2023	I Hate Christmas	Titti	TV series; main role
2022–2023	The Net	Miriam Martelli	TV miniseries; main role

== Television programmes ==
- RIP: Roast in Peace (Prime Video, 2025)
