= Guido Chiesa =

Italian film director and screenwriter

Guido Chiesa (born 1959) is an Italian film director and screenwriter.

Born in Turin, Chiesa graduated in philosophy and letters with a thesis in cinema, and subsequently moved to New York City where he was the correspondent of several music magazines as well as the assistant of film directors such as Michael Cimino, Amos Poe and Jim Jarmusch, among others. After he returned to Italy, he made his directorial debut in 1991 with the drama film Il caso Martello. In 2000, he entered the competition at the 57th Venice International Film Festival with the war drama Johnny the Partisan. He competed again at the Venice International Film Festival in 2004, with the drama film Working Slowly (Radio Alice).

== Filmography ==
=== As director ===
- Il caso Martello (1991)
- Babylon: La paura è la migliore amica dell'uomo (1994)
- Johnny the Partisan (2000)
- Provini per un massacro (2000)
- Working Slowly (Radio Alice) (2004)
- Let It Be (2010)
- Belli di papà (2015)
- Classe Z (2017)
- Ti presento Sofia (2018)
- Cambio tutto! (2020)
- Una notte da dottore (2021)
- 30 notti con il mio ex (2025)
