= Ernesto Mahieux =

Italian actor (born 1946)

- Born: 12 July 1946 (age 79); Naples, Italy
- Occupation: Actor
- Years active: 1975–present
- Awards: 2003: David di Donatello for Best Supporting Actor

Ernesto Mahieux (born 12 July 1946), sometimes credited under the name Ernesto Maiè, is an Italian actor.

== Biography ==
Born in Naples in 1946, he abandoned school to work in different jobs and to live in Milan and Rome.

From the second half of the seventies and eighties, with the role of the first comic, he took numerous parts, such as Teresa Esposito of Alberto Sciotti (1980), Tanti Auguri and Eternamente.;

== Filmography ==
- Giuramento, directed by Alfonso Brescia (1982)
- Torna, directed by Stelvio Massi (1984)
- Guapparia, directed by Stelvio Massi (1984)
- Maccheroni, directed by Ettore Scola (1985)
- Separati in casa, directed by Riccardo Pazzaglia (1986)
- Ternosecco, directed by Giancarlo Giannini (1987)
- Chiari di luna, directed by Lello Arena (1988)
- C'è posto per tutti, directed by Giancarlo Planta (1989)
- Aitanic, directed by Nino D'Angelo (2000)
- L'imbalsamatore, directed by Matteo Garrone (2001)
- Doppio agguato, directed by Renato De Maria (2003)
- Pater Familias, directed by Francesco Patierno (2003)
- Gli angeli di Borsellino, directed by Rocco Cesareo (2003)
- L'avvocato De Gregorio, directed by Pasquale Squitieri (2003)
- Vanilla and Chocolate, directed by Ciro Ippolito (2004)
- I Can See It in Your Eyes, directed by Valia Santella (2004)
- La caccia, directed by Massimo Spano (2004)
- Chiamami Salomé, directed by Claudio Sestieri (2005)
- Raul - Diritto di uccidere, directed by Andrea Bolognini (2005)
- Ventitré, directed by Duccio Forzano (2005)
- Troppo belli, directed by Ugo Fabrizio Giordani (2005)
- ...e se domani, directed by Giovanni La Parola (2005)
- Mi fido di te, directed by Massimo Venier (2006)
- Nuovomondo (Golden Door), directed by Emanuele Crialese (2006)
- Salvatore - Questa è la vita, directed by Gian Paolo Cugno (2006)
- All the Invisible Children (episodio Ciro), directed by Stefano Veneruso (2006)
- I Trust You, directed by Massimo Venier (2007)
- 7/8, directed by Stefano Landini (2007)
- Nero bifamiliare, directed by Federico Zampaglione (2007)
- Il punto rosso, directed by Marco Carlucci (2007)
- Hotel Meina, directed by Carlo Lizzani (2007)
- Lascia perdere, Johnny! (Don't Waste Your Time Johnny!), directed by Fabrizio Bentivoglio (2007)
- Pane e libertà, miniserie TV, directed by Alberto Negrin (2009)
- L'imbroglio nel lenzuolo, directed by Alfonso Arau (2009)
- Neve sporca, directed by Davide Marengo (2009)
- Fort Apache Napoli, directed by Marco Risi (2009)
- Liberiamo qualcosa, directed by Guido Tortorella (2009)
- Napoli, Napoli, Napoli, directed by Abel Ferrara (2009)
- La valigia sul letto, directed by Eduardo Tartaglia (2010)
- Un giorno della vita, directed by Giuseppe Papasso (2011)
- Il profumo dei gerani (2010)
- Senza arte né parte directed by Giovanni Albanese (2011)
- Ganja Fiction (2011)
- The Last Fashion Show (2011)
- Cristina directed by Antonio Castaldo (2012)
- Il ragioniere della mafia directed by Federico Rizzo (2012)
- The Legendary Giulia and Other Miracles directed by Edoardo Leo (2015)
- Quel bravo ragazzo (2016)
- Beware the Gorilla directed by Luca Miniero (2019)
- Generation 56K (2021)
