= Diana Del Bufalo =

Italian actress, singer and television host

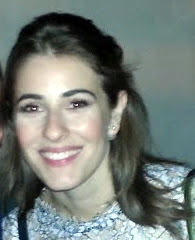
- Del Bufalo in 2017
- Born: 8 February 1990 (age 36); Rome, Italy
- Occupations: Actress; singer
- Years active: 2010–present
- Father: Dario del Bufalo

Diana Del Bufalo (born 8 February 1990) is an Italian actress and singer.

After competing during the tenth season of Amici di Maria De Filippi (2010–2011), she gained recognition for her multiple roles in film, theatre and television. She starred in Wedding in Paris (2011), I soliti idioti film series (2011–2013), My Big Gay Italian Wedding (2018), La profezia dell'armadillo (2018), Beware the Gorilla (2019), L'agenzia dei bugiardi (2019), 7 Women and a Murder (2021) and Still Fabulous (2024). On television, she hosted the sixteenth season of Colorado (2015) and played Monica Giulietti in Rai 1 comedy-drama series Che Dio ci aiuti (2017–2021). In 2023, Del Bufalo was cast as Sally Bowes in the Italian tour of Cabaret.

== Biography ==
Diana Del Bufalo was born in Rome on 8 February 1990. Her father is Dario Del Bufalo, an architect and archeologist and her mother is Ornella Pratesi, a soprano. Diana has an older brother named Giano. In 2010 she participated as a singer in the talent show Amici di Maria de Filippi. Her elimination caused Platinette, a judge, to strip during the live broadcast to show his disagreement. During the show she recorded her first single "Nelle mie favole", featured in the music compilation of Amici 10. She has hosted Mai dire Amici, a comedy show developed by Gialappa's Band for Italian television channel Canale 5.

In the summer of 2011 she made her debut in cinema as the co-protagonist of the movie Matrimonio a Parigi directed by Massimo Boldi. Diana then went on to host the Italian TV show Pianeta Mare broadcast on Rete 4. In the summer of 2013 she hosted Summer Festival on Canale 5. She then made her radio debut as a host for Radio LUISS in the broadcast Hit Chart. In 2014 she published online several songs produced by Francesco Arpino and performed weekly in the first season of television show XLove. In 2015 she hosted Italian TV show Colorado on Italia 1 alongside Paolo Ruffini. Between 2015 and 2016 she participated in Rai's television series C'era una volta Studio Uno, in the role of Rita. In 2017 she also participated in the fourth season of Rai's fiction Che Dio ci aiuti.

In 2017 she was a guest at the Sanremo Music Festival. In the same year she also hosted, alongside Giorgio Panariello, Panariello sotto l'albero on Rai 1. In March 2018 she starred in the comedy Puoi baciare lo sposo, directed by Alessandro Genovesi as well as in the movie La profezia dell'armadillo, based on the comic book by Zerocalcare. In 2019 she hosted Un'estate fa alongside singer Pupo on Rai 1. Del Bufalo is currently part of the cast of real-life thriller, Celebrity Hunted: Caccia all'uomo, produced by Endemol Shine Italy and broadcast on Prime Video where she is paired with Cristiano Caccamo. In 2020 she hosted alongside Diego Abatantuono Enjoy - Ridere fa bene on Rai 1. Between June 2020 and February 2021 she was involved in the filming of the sixth season of Che Dio ci aiuti, starring as Monica Giulietti.

== Personal life ==
After being in a relationship with singer Francesco Arpino, from 2015 to 2019 she was involved with actor and director Paolo Ruffini, whom she met during her time hosting television show Colorado. From 2019 until October 2020 she was in a relationship with Edoardo Tavassi.

== Filmography ==
=== Films ===
Year	Title	Role	Notes
2011	Wedding in Paris	Natalina Quasimodo	Feature film debut
2011	I soliti idioti: Il film	Manuela	
2012	Operazione vacanze	Rossana	
2012	I 2 soliti idioti	Manuela	
2013	Una vita da sogno	Donata	
2018	My Big Gay Italian Wedding	Benedetta Stanchi	
2018	La profezia dell'armadillo	Greta	
2019	Beware the Gorilla	Concita	
2019	L'agenzia dei bugiardi	Cinzia	
2019	When Mom Is Away	Lucia	
2020	7 ore per farti innamorare	Giorgia	
2021	Encanto	Isabela Madrigal	Italian voice-over
2021	7 Women and a Murder	Susanna	
2022	Il dono	Ella	Short film; voice role
2024	Still Fabulous	Maddalena	
2026	Still Sexy	Maddalena	

=== Television ===
Year	Title	Role	Notes
2010–2011	Amici di Maria De Filippi	Herself / Contestant	Talent show (season 10)
2011	Mai dire... Amici	Herself / Host	Parody of Amici di Maria De Filippi
2011–2012	Così fan tutte	Diana	2 episodes
2015	XLove	Herself / Various	Variety show
2015	Colorado	Herself / Host	Comedy show (season 16)
2017	C'era una volta Studio Uno	Rita Razzetti	Miniseries
2017–2021	Che Dio ci aiuti	Monica Giulietti	Main role (seasons 4–6)
2020	Enjoy	Herself / Host / Various	Stand-up comedy
2020	Celebrity Hunted: Caccia all'uomo	Herself / Contestant	Reality show (season 1)
2022	LOL - Chi ride è fuori	Herself / Contestant	Reality show (season 2)

== Radio ==
- Hit Chart (Radio LUISS, 2011-2012)

== Stage ==
Year	Title	Role	Venue
2022	Seven Brides for Seven Brothers	Milly	Italian tour Awarded at Venice Film Festival for Best Musical
2023–2024	Cabaret	Sally Bowles	Italian tour
2025	Moulin Rouge!	Satine	Teatro Sistina, Rome

== Events ==
- Diversity Media Awards (2018)

== Discography ==
=== Singles ===
- 2013 - Beep Beep (A Ha)
- 2014 - La Foresta (Ce L'Ho Pelosa)
- 2021 - Flashdance

=== Features ===
- 2010 - AA.VV. Amici 10, con il brano Nelle mie favole

== Acknowledgements ==
CinéCiak d'Oro

- 2018 - Rivelazione dell'anno

Biglietto d'Oro

- 2019 - Chiavi d'oro del successo for 10 giorni senza mamma
