= I Trust You =

- Italian: Mi fido di te
- Directed by: Massimo Venier
- Written by: Ale e Franz; Walter Fontana; Mauro Spinelli; Massimo Venier
- Starring: Alessandro Besentini; Francesco Villa; Maddalena Maggi; Lucia Ocone; Ernesto Mahieux; Roberto Citran
- Cinematography: Italo Petriccione
- Music by: Paolo Jannacci; Daniele Moretto
- Distributed by: Medusa Film
- Release date: 9 February 2007 (Italy)
- Running time: 100 min
- Country: Italy
- Language: Italian

I Trust You (Italian: Mi fido di te) is a 2007 comedy film directed by Massimo Venier and starring comedy duo Ale e Franz.

== Cast ==
- Alessandro Besentini as Alessandro
- Francesco Villa as Francesco
- Maddalena Maggi as Veronica Orsini
- Lucia Ocone as Susanna Besozzi
- Ernesto Mahieux as Kappadue
- Roberto Citran as Gaetano Aleotti
- Paolo Pierobon as Guidoni
- Emanuele Arrigazzi as Vladimir
- Marco Marzocca as Pino
- Nicola Savino as a waiter
