= Raffaella Fico =

Italian showgirl, singer and model

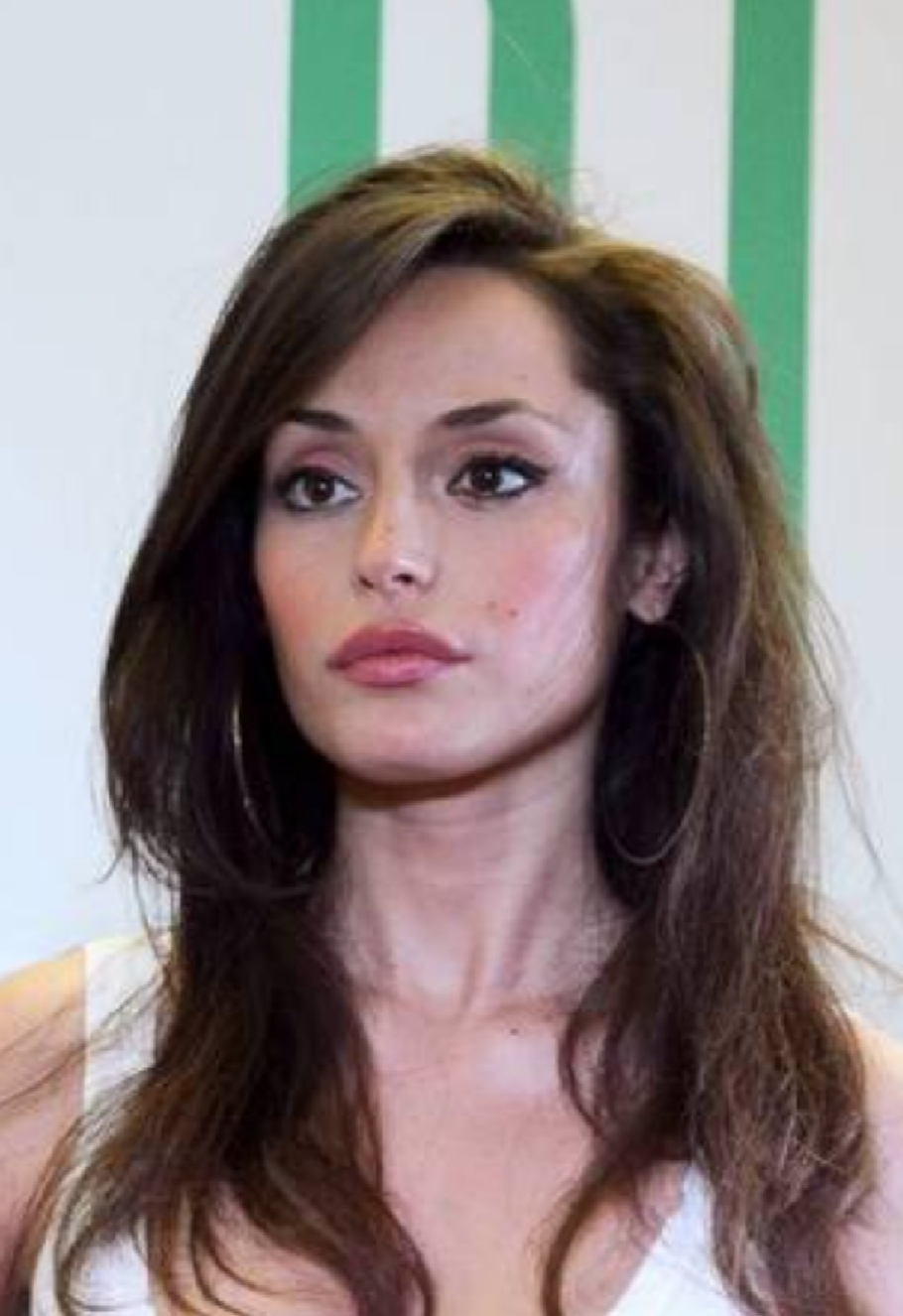
- Fico in 2012
- Born: 29 January 1988 (age 37); Cercola, Italy
- Occupations: Model; showgirl; actress; singer
- Years active: 2007–present
- Children: 1
- Website: raffaellafico.it

Raffaella Fico (born 29 January 1988) is an Italian showgirl, singer, and model.

== Life and career ==
Born in Cercola, Fico is the daughter of two shopkeepers of fruit and vegetables. In August 2007, she won an Italian beauty contest, "Miss Grand Prix".

Fico became first known one year later thanks to her participation in the eighth edition of Il Grande Fratello, the Italian version of the reality show Big Brother. The same year she received widespread media attention for having allegedly auction off her virginity for €1 million during an interview for the Italian magazine Chi. In 2008 she also made her film debut in Storia di un amore by Maria Manna.

In 2009, she hosted the Italia 1 show Real TV on Italia 1. Between 2009 and 2010 she featured in four quiz shows hosted by Enrico Papi and broadcast on Italia 1 (Il colore dei soldi, Prendere o lasciare, Cento X Cento and Trasformat).

In October 2009, she had an alleged relationship with football player Cristiano Ronaldo.

In August 2010, she featured in the variety television Mitici 80 on Italia 1. The same year she was in the cast of the variety show Saturday Night Live from Milano, the Italian version of the Saturday Night Live, and appeared in the Italian comedy film Matrimonio a Parigi.

In 2011, she was involved in the Silvio Berlusconi's "Bunga Bunga" sex scandal as one of the girls who regularly met the Italian Prime Minister in his alleged sex parties. Shortly after her name came to light by interceptions she took part in the Rai 2 reality show L'isola dei famosi. The same year she entered the ballroom dance show Baila on Canale 5.

In September 2012, she walked the runway of Milan Fashion Week while 6 months pregnant, wearing a bikini.

Between December 2011 and January 2012, she had an on-and-off relationship with football player Mario Balotelli. Balotelli asked for a paternity test in July 2012 in response to her pregnancy. In 2013 Balotelli had to defend himself against Raffaella Fico's accusations of being "irresponsible" and "unconcerned" about his newborn baby daughter, Pia. Balotelli had finally acknowledged paternity of her daughter Pia on 6 February 2014.

In June 2014 Fico, under the record label Momy Records / Do It Yourself sang her debut single, joining as a singer in the world of pop / urban / hip-hop. The piece is titled "Rush" produced by Gianluca Tozzi (son of the Italian singer Umberto Tozzi), On 10 June, it was published on his YouTube channel accompanied by the official video. The song is available on iTunes since 9 June.

On 22 October 2014, she published her first album called as her single Rush, with ten tracks.

== Filmography ==
Films and television
| Year | Title | Role | Notes |
|---|---|---|---|
| 2008 | Grande Fratello | Herself | Contestant (season 8) |
| 2008 | Sguardi diversi | Alessia | Feature film |
| 2009–11 | Real TV | Herself | Co-host (season 6) |
| 2010–11 | Saturday Night Live from Milano | Various | Season 4 |
| 2011 | Così fan tutte | Raffaella | Guest star (season 2) |
| 2011 | L'Isola dei Famosi | Herself | Contestant (season 8) |
| 2011 | Wedding in Paris | Beatrice | Feature film |
| 2013–14 | La cena dei cretini | Sonia Bertolondo | Lead role |
| 2019 | Storie italiane | Herself | Regular guest |
| 2021 | Grande Fratello Vip | Herself | Contestant (season 6) |
