= Still Sexy =

2026 Italian comedy film

- Italian: Ancora più sexy
- Directed by: Michela Andreozzi
- Written by: Michela Andreozzi; Daniela Delle Foglie; Dalila Lange; Mauro Mocerino
- Starring: Diana Del Bufalo; Valentina Nappi; Mario Ermito; Michele Rosiello; Filippo Bisciglia; Angela Finocchiaro
- Cinematography: Davide Manca
- Edited by: Luciana Pandolfelli
- Music by: Michele Braga
- Distributed by: Amazon Prime Video
- Release date: 12 June 2026
- Running time: 100 minutes
- Country: Italy
- Language: Italian

Still Sexy (Italian: Ancora più sexy) is a 2026 Italian romantic comedy film directed by Michela Andreozzi, starring Diana Del Bufalo and Valentina Nappi. It is the sequel to the 2024 film Still Fabulous and was released internationally on Amazon Prime Video on 12 June 2026.

== Cast ==
- Diana Del Bufalo as Maddalena
- Valentina Nappi as herself
- Mario Ermito as Bruno
- Michele Rosiello as Vanni
- Filippo Bisciglia as himself
- Angela Finocchiaro as Grazia
- Anna Galiena as Adelaide
- Paolo Calabresi as Lucio
- Ludovica Di Donato as Maria
- Fabrizio Colica as Stefano
- Andrea Dianetti as Giuseppe
- Fabrizio Sabatucci as Claudio
- Niccolò Senni as Tommaso
- Nicola Jiang as Aki
- Nini Salerno as Erminio
- Barbara Alberti as herself
- Orietta Berti as herself
- Paola Iezzi as herself
- Simon & the Stars as himself
- Ema Stokholma as herself
- Ditonellapiaga as herself
- Nino Frassica as himself
