= Dario del Bufalo =

Italian mosaic and antiquity expert

- Born: January 30, 1958 (age 68); Rome, Italy
- Occupations: Architect; antiquity expert; architect; restorer.
- Writing career
- Language: Italian

Dario del Bufalo (Rome, 30 January 1958) is an Italian mosaic and antiquity expert, architect, author, and restorer.

== Education ==
Del Bufalo graduated with Laude in 1987 with a PhD in architecture from Sapienza University in Rome.

== Career ==
From 1998 to 2007 he taught a course on the "History of architectural techniques and ancient materials" at the University of Lecce. He was President of the Università dei Marmorari in Rome on the occasion of the sixth centenary of its foundation (2006).

Del Bufalo is author of many books and titles about Roman art and architecture, old coloured marbles and sculpture.

He is the author or co-author of numerous other volumes, including the museum catalogue for the 2021-2022 exhibition Il falso nell'arte. Alceo Dossena e la scultura italiana del Rinascimento (The false in art. Alceo Dossena and Italian Renaissance sculpture) at the Museum of Modern and Contemporary Art of Trento and Rovereto. He has written on the subject for The Art Newspaper.

Del Bufalo is also noted for having restored the Castello della Cecchignola in Rome.

=== Caligula mosaic ===
Del Bufalo gained widespread coverage when he rediscovered an antiquity featured in his book, a marble mosaic that had been part of the flooring on one of the Roman Emperor Caligula's pleasure boats, the Nemi ships which were more like floating buildings than boats and never meant to sail. Following Caligula's assassination in AD 41 the boats were sunk on the orders of the Roman Senate and the Praetorian guard.

Lake Nemi (30 km (19 mi) south of Rome) was drained by Benito Mussolini in the 1920s and the ships became visible again. A museum was founded and built above the vessels. The museum and the ships were destroyed by fire during World War II. This particular piece which survived went missing in the 1960s. It fell into private hands and was eventually sold by an aristocratic Italian family to New York City antiques dealer Helen Fioratti and her husband Nereo. The piece, which served as the top of a coffee table in the Fioratti's apartment was seized by the New York County District Attorney's Office and then repatriated to Italy.

== Bibliography ==
- Precious Portraits, Allemandi Editore, Torino 2020.
- Porphyry. Red Imperial Porphyry Power and Religion, 2a edizione, Allemandi Editore, Torino 2018.
- Murrina Vasa. A luxury of Imperial Rome, L’Erma di Bretschneider, Roma 2016.
- Porphyry. Red Imperial Porphyry Power and Religion, Allemandi Editore, Torino 2012.
- Marmorari Magistri Romani, L’Erma di Bretschneider, Roma 2010.
- L'Università dei Marmorari di Roma, L’Erma di Bretschneider, Roma 2007.
- Marbres de couleur. Pierres et architecture de l’Antiquité au XVIII siècle, Actes Sud, Paris 2004.
- Marmi Colorati: Le Pietre e L'Architettura dall'Antico al Barocco, Motta Editore, Milano 2003.
- Marmi antichi e Pietre dure, Congedo Editore, Galatina in 2000.

== Family life ==
His daughter is the actress and singer Diana Del Bufalo (b. 1990).
