= L'agenzia dei bugiardi =

2019 Italian comedy film

- Theatrical release poster
- Directed by: Volfango De Biasi
- Written by: Volfango de Biasi; Fabio Bonifacci
- Starring: Giampaolo Morelli; Massimo Ghini; Alessandra Mastronardi; Paolo Ruffini; Herbert Ballerina; Diana Del Bufalo; Carla Signoris
- Cinematography: Manfredo Archinto
- Edited by: Stefano Chierchiè
- Music by: Michele Braga
- Distributed by: Medusa Film
- Release date: 17 January 2019 (Italy)
- Running time: 90 minutes
- Country: Italy
- Language: Italian

L'agenzia dei bugiardi (lit. 'The agency of liars') is a 2019 Italian comedy film directed by Volfango De Biasi.

The film is a remake of the 2017 French film Alibi.com.

== Cast ==
- Giampaolo Morelli as Fred
- Massimo Ghini as Alberto
- Alessandra Mastronardi as Clio
- Paolo Ruffini as Paolo
- Herbert Ballerina as Diego
- Diana Del Bufalo as Cinzia
- Carla Signoris as Irene
- Paolo Calabresi as Maurizio
- Antonello Fassari as Monsignor Carbonelli
- Raiz as the head of the gypsies
- Francesco Marioni as the first customer
- Piero Pelù as himself
- Giulio Golia as himself
- Nicolas Vaporidis as a driver
