= Mariano Di Vaio =

Italian blogger, fashion designer and actor

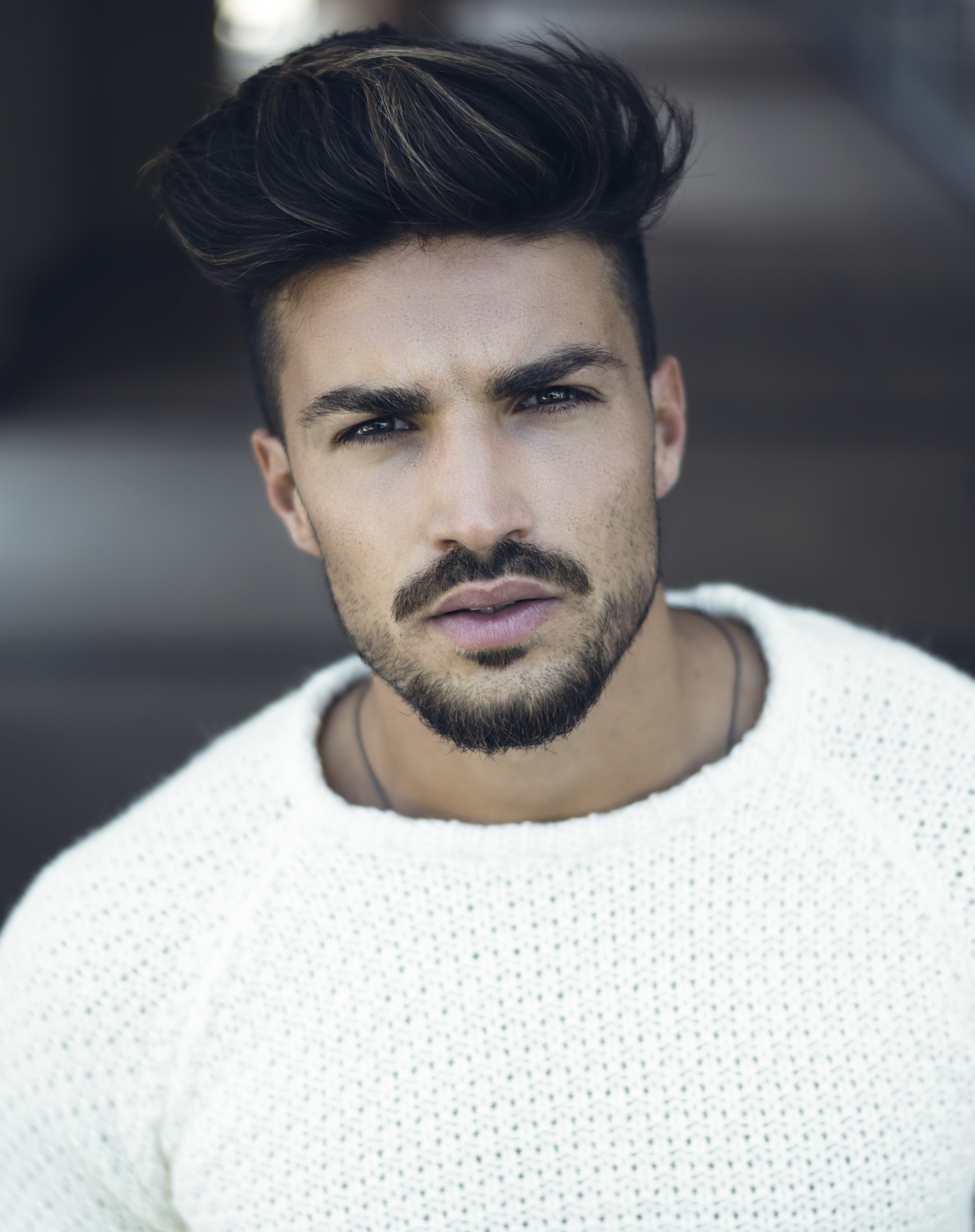
- Di Vaio in 2016
- Occupation(s): Digital entrepreneur, designer, model, actor
- Spouse: Eleonora Brunacci (m. 2015)
- Website: www.nohowstyle.com

Mariano Di Vaio is an Italian blogger, fashion designer and actor. He has been a brand ambassador for Hugo Boss, Dolce & Gabbana and Calvin Klein. His first published book is My Dream Job. He launched his line of jewels, MDV Jewels, a collection of shoes, MDV Shoes, and his Eyewear collection, MDV Eyewear. The first movie he appeared in is Deported, a Hollywood production by Yoram Globus.

== Career ==
Di Vaio at the age of eighteen left Italy to pursue his acting and modeling careers, working one year as a model in London, and then studying acting at NYFA (New York Film Academy) in New York City.

In 2016, Di Vaio published his first book, the biography My Dream Job.

== Personal life ==
In September 2015, he married Eleonora Brunacci in Castello di Procopio.

== Television ==
In the autumn of 2016, Mariano Di Vaio (with the dancer Stefano De Martino) was one of the tutors/mentors in the first season of Selfie – Le cose cambiano, the Italian talent show produced by Fascino PGT of Maria De Filippi and aired by Canale 5 with Simona Ventura as presenter.

== Filmography ==
Year	Title	Role
2016	Deported	Craig List model
2024	Still Fabulous	Himself
