= Beware the Gorilla =

2019 Italian comedy film

- Film poster
- Italian: Attenti al gorilla
- Directed by: Luca Miniero
- Written by: Giulia Gianni; Luca Miniero; Gina Neri
- Produced by: Lorenzo Gangarossa; Mario Gianani; Lorenzo Mieli
- Starring: Frank Matano; Cristiana Capotondi; Lillo Petrolo; Francesco Scianna; Diana Del Bufalo; Claudio Bisio
- Cinematography: Federico Angelucci
- Edited by: Pietro Morana
- Music by: Pasquale Catalano
- Distributed by: Warner Bros. Pictures Italy
- Release date: 10 January 2019
- Running time: 95 minutes
- Country: Italy
- Language: Italian

Beware the Gorilla (Italian: Attenti al gorilla) is a 2019 Italian comedy film directed by Luca Miniero.

== Plot ==
Lorenzo is a lawyer who decides to sue the zoo in his city, but after winning he has to take home a gorilla named Peppe. Lorenzo is divorcing, but uses his new awkward situation for saving his relationship with his children, the eldest son Ale and two twins named Rosa and Sara.

== Cast ==
- Frank Matano as Lorenzo Caputo
- Cristiana Capotondi as Emma
- Lillo Petrolo as Jimmy
- Francesco Scianna as Alfonso
- Diana Del Bufalo as Concita
- Claudio Bisio as Peppe the gorilla (voice)
  - Peter John Elliott as Peppe the gorilla (acting)
- Davide Mirti as Ale
- Giada Ferrone as Rosa
- Ambra Ferrone as Sara
- Massimo De Lorenzo as Gus
- Ernesto Mahieux as the gypsy
- Salvatore Misticone as the chef
