= Still Fabulous =

2024 Italian comedy film

- Italian: Pensati sexy
- Directed by: Michela Andreozzi
- Written by: Michela Andreozzi; Daniela Delle Foglie
- Produced by: Fabio Castaldi; Marco De Angelis; Nicola De Angelis
- Starring: Diana Del Bufalo; Valentina Nappi; Raoul Bova; Alessandro Tiberi; Angela Finocchiaro
- Cinematography: Maurizio Calvesi
- Music by: Michele Braga
- Distributed by: Amazon Prime Video
- Release date: 12 February 2024
- Country: Italy
- Language: Italian

Still Fabulous (Italian: Pensati sexy) is a 2024 Italian romantic comedy film directed by Michela Andreozzi, starring Diana Del Bufalo and Valentina Nappi. It was released internationally by Amazon Prime Video on 12 February 2024. A sequel, Still Sexy, was released in June 2026.

== Plot ==
Maddalena is a thirty-year-old with low self-esteem and awkwardness in relationships, working as a ghostwriter at a publishing house. Always the least favored by her very religious mother Grazia, she also has to deal with her sister Maria, the family's pride, who is pregnant with her second child. At work, she is routinely mistreated by the director Erika and is attracted to the charming head of the publishing house, Donato. She accepts his invitation for a night of sex despite knowing he is married. The encounter fizzles out due to her clumsiness in undressing, which dampens his desire. Maddalena decides to learn how to be sexy by looking at porn sites. After eating a marijuana cake from her roommate Stefano, she starts having visions of porn star Valentina Nappi, who begins giving her advice on how to boost her self-esteem.

At her sister's gender reveal party, she meets Leonardo, the brother-in-law's friend, a relatively unknown comedian who captivates her with his self-irony and confidence. They begin a friendship.

The publishing house signs a deal with influencer Lara. Maddalena is assigned as the ghostwriter for Lara's autobiography. During the book launch event, Erika treats Maddalena poorly, leading her to resign on the spot. The incident is filmed by the audience and goes viral. She attends a party organized by Lara, who comes out as lesbian, but forgets Leonardo's invitation to his show. Valentina intervenes, explaining that while Maddalena's self-esteem has grown, it is still constrained by her need for external approval. Maddalena accepts Donato's invitation again because he claims his wife left him, but after a night of sex, she discovers that his wife was only away for a weekend with friends. Maddalena takes control of her life and simplicity but is now capable of being sensual. She finally accepts a job offer from another publishing house to be a leading author. At the launch event for her novel, she confesses her feelings to Leonardo, and they have sex in the bathroom, leading to a stable relationship.

In a mid-credits scene, Maddalena attends an event featuring Valentina Nappi, thanking her for the advice. The porn star does not recognize her and has her removed.

== Cast ==
- Diana Del Bufalo as Maddalena
- Valentina Nappi as herself
- Raoul Bova as Donato
- Alessandro Tiberi as Leonardo
- Angela Finocchiaro as Grazia
- Jenny De Nucci as Lara
- Sara Baccarini as Serena
- Camilla Filippi as Erika
- Niccolò Senni as Tommaso
- Fabrizio Colica as Stefano
- Ludovica Di Donato as Maria
- Andrea Dianetti as Giuseppe
- Massimiliano Vado as Father Massimo
- Esther Elisha as Malika
- Tea Hacic as Samantha
- Francesco Piazza as Giacomo "Legolas"
- Mariano Di Vaio as himself
- Daniela Delle Foglie as herself
- Francesca Barra as herself
