= Valentina Nappi =

Italian pornographic film actress (born 1990)

- Nappi in 2017
- Born: 6 November 1990 (age 36); Scafati, Salerno, Italy
- Occupations: Pornographic film actress; adult model
- Years active: 2011–present
- Height: 5 ft 4 in (1.63 m)
- Spouse: Giovanni Lagnese (m. 2020)
- Awards: XBIZ Award for Foreign Female Performer of the Year

Valentina Nappi (Italian pronunciation: [valenˈtiːna ˈnappi]; born 6 November 1990) is an Italian pornographic film actress and adult model. She has won numerous awards including the 2017 XBIZ Award for the Foreign Female Performer of the Year.

Nappi has also contributed writings on sexuality and society, spoken publicly about pornography, and appeared in non-pornographic films.

== Life and career ==
Valentina Nappi was born on 6 November 1990 in Scafati, between Naples and Salerno. She made her debut in the adult industry in 2011 with director Rocco Siffredi after she contacted him via email. After making her debut in Rocco's POV Volume 24, she appeared in Rocco's Bitches in Uniform, which was made by Evil Angel in 2012. She then continued to work on productions both in Italy and in the United States. Her work has also included femdom productions, including appearances for Kink.com.

She graduated from art school in Salerno and studied design at the Second University of Naples. Often referred to as an "intellectual pornstar", Nappi has written several essays on the condition of men and women in contemporary society and has been a speaker in several philosophy festivals and conferences. In December 2018, she gave a TEDx talk titled Porn and common space.

She was a Playmate in the Italian issue of Playboy in June 2012 and Penthouse Pet of the Month in November 2013. In September 2015, she appeared on the cover of Hustler's Taboo. As of March 2016, she writes a column in the political and social magazine MicroMega.

In 2018, she was the subject of the documentary Io sono Valentina Nappi ("I am Valentina Nappi").

In 2024, she starred in the Amazon Prime Video romantic comedy film Still Fabulous, directed by Michela Andreozzi. She later returned for the sequel Still Sexy, released in 2026.

In November 2026, Nappi appeared in season two of the Italian version of The Traitors.

== Personal life ==
Nappi identifies as a lifelong atheist. In September 2020, she married Giovanni Lagnese, her life partner since 2009. Nappi has described their marriage as an open relationship.

== Awards ==
- 2014 XCritic Special Recognition Award
- 2016 AVN Award – Best Three-Way Sex Scene (G/G/B) in Anikka's Anal Sluts (with Anikka Albrite and Mick Blue)
- 2017 AVN Award – Best Transsexual Scene in Girl/Boy 2 (with Buck Angel)
- 2017 XBIZ Award – Foreign Female Performer of the Year
- 2018 XBIZ Europa Award – International Crossover Star
- 2019 XCritic Award – Best Foreign Female Performer
- 2019 XRCO Award – Unsung Siren
- 2020 XCritic Award – Best Foreign Female Performer
- 2021 XCritic Award – Best Foreign Female Performer
- 2022 XCritic Award – Best Foreign Female Performer
- 2025 AVN Award – Most Outrageous Sex Scene in Trentebeard
- 2026 AVN Award – Best Actress - Featurette in Shamanologist
- 2026 AVN Award – Most Outrageous Sex Scene in Shamanologist
