= Wedding in Paris =

- Directed by: Claudio Risi
- Written by: Edgardo Falcone; Massimo Boldi
- Starring: Massimo Boldi; Anna Maria Barbera; Paola Minaccioni; Enzo Salvi; Biagio Izzo; Massimo Ceccherini; Rocco Siffredi; Diana Del Bufalo; Emanuele Bosi; Loredana De Nardis; Raffaella Fico; Guglielmo Scilla
- Release date: 2011
- Running time: 102 minutes
- Country: Italy
- Language: Italian

Matrimonio a Parigi (internationally released as Wedding in Paris) is a 2011 Italian comedy film directed by Claudio Risi and starring Massimo Boldi.

== Cast ==
- Massimo Boldi: Lorenzo
- Annamaria Barbera: Costanza
- Biagio Izzo: Gennaro
- Massimo Ceccherini: Leonardo
- Enzo Salvi: Annibale
- Rocco Siffredi: François
- Diana Del Bufalo: Natalina
- Paola Minaccioni: Elvira
- Emanuele Bosi: Mirko
- Raffaella Fico: Beatrice
- Guglielmo Scilla: Diego

== Plot ==
A businessman in Italy, who sells his products directly on a television channel without paying any taxes, and a financier, dutiful and always on the hunt for tax evaders, come into contact because their sons, both artists, share an apartment in Paris. Graduation Day is the excuse for a trip to the French capital where the paths of the two families cross.
