= Things from Another World (film) =

2011 film

- Theatrical release poster
- Directed by: Francesco Patierno
- Written by: Diego De Silva; Giovanna Koch; Francesco Patierno
- Starring: Diego Abatantuono
- Cinematography: Mauro Marchetti
- Music by: Simone Cristicchi
- Distributed by: Medusa Film
- Release date: 3 September 2011
- Running time: 90 minutes
- Country: Italy
- Language: Italian

Things from Another World (Italian: Cose dell'altro mondo) is a 2011 Italian comedy film directed by Francesco Patierno, loosely based on A Day Without a Mexican.

== Cast ==
- Diego Abatantuono as Mariso Golfetto
- Laura Efrikian as Ariele's mother
- Valentina Lodovini as Laura
- Valerio Mastandrea as Ariele Verderame
- Paola Rivetta as herself
- Roberta Sparta as Truccatrice
- Vitaliano Trevisan as Tassista

== See also ==
- Films about immigration to Italy
