= Virginity auction =

Auction where a person seeks to sell their virginity

A virginity auction is an auction, often publicized online, where a virgin tries to sell the right to be the first to have intercourse with them.

Often the authenticity of such auctions is subject to question, and it is not later verified whether the auction was successfully completed. A number of high-profile auctions such as the 2008 auction of "Natalie Dylan" and 2012 auction of Catarina Migliorini were never completed. In some cases, the seller reports they are seeking money to pay for expenses such as medical bills or school tuition; in others, the seller has pledged that some portion of the earnings will be given to charity, or emphasizes the social questions involved in selling one's virginity.

Attempts to auction virginity online date back to at least early 2004. The earliest known Internet attempt to capitalize on virginity was the 1998 hoax Our First Time where two alleged 18-year-olds planned to have sex for the first time online. In another notable hoax, in August 1999, an alleged 17-year-old male American high school senior named Francis D. Cornworth posted an auction for his virginity on eBay. Bids quickly rose from an initial $10 to $10 million before the listing was removed.

== Notable virginity auction reports ==
In chronological order, virginity auctions which have received substantial news reporting include:

=== Cathy Cobblerson (likely fictional) ===
The 4 January 2004, issue of the Weekly World News reported that 24-year-old American Cathy Cobblerson was selling her virginity on an auction website, and hoped to receive US$100,000 to pay off her debts. However, the Weekly World News was a largely fictional publication; the front-page headline in the same issue announced that Noah's Ark had been discovered in Iraq. The Cobblerson auction was subsequently mentioned in the Rosie Reid auction coverage by the News of the World later the same month. No proof that the Cobblerson auction was real has ever been provided; it has, however, been mentioned in later articles listing past virginity auctions.

=== Rosie Reid (claimed to be completed by British tabloid) ===
In late January 2004, the British tabloid News of the World reported that 18-year-old lesbian Rosie Reid was auctioning her virginity to pay for her school tuition. She initially listed the auction on eBay, posting: "Eighteen-year-old university student looking to sell virginity. Never lost it due to lesbianism. Will bung in free massage if you are any good. Picture on request." The NOTW article also stated that eBay had removed the auction after three days, and a separate website was being set up to continue the auction. That website described Rosie as an "18-year old lesbian (muff diver) virgin", and told bidders "You are bidding for a prime piece. 18 years young, NO PREVIOUS OWNERS! Shipping will be covered by the vendor, item is non refundable. This product may contain traces of nuts." The site highlighted the lack of financial support available to students like her. The NOTW subsequently reported in March 2004 that Rosie had sold her virginity for £8,400 to a 44-year-old BT engineer and divorced father of two children, and that she and her partner were upset by the experience. A BT employee located by the British press denied any involvement in the matter. In May 2004, it was reported that a film company owned by Madonna was working on a movie about Rosie's story, though nothing further about the project was ever reported.

=== Graciela Yataco (not completed) ===
In March 2005, 18-year-old Peruvian model Graciela Yataco was reported to be offering to sell her virginity to help her poor family and sick mother. In April 2005, she retracted the plan, reportedly turning down a $1.5 million offer from a Canadian man, and denying that the event had been a publicity stunt.

=== Carys Copestake (unconfirmed sale) ===
In July 2007, a British tabloid reported that an 18-year-old student was selling her virginity for £10,000 on a website used by prostitutes. When contacted by the press, she claimed she was busy at work and had been offered the sum in cash.

=== Natalie Dylan (not completed) ===
In September 2008, a 22-year-old American woman calling herself Natalie Dylan announced on The Howard Stern Show that she would auction off her virginity on the Moonlite Bunny Ranch website, and that the act would be consummated at the ranch. She claimed to be inspired by the case of Graciela Yataco listed above. A recent women's studies graduate from Sacramento State, who grew up in La Jolla, California, Dylan claimed she planned to use the money to finance graduate school and said "I feel empowered because I am being pro-choice with my body." She retained the right to reject the winner of the auction and pick another bidder, claiming that several bids had exceeded $1 million. The highest claimed bid was approximately $3.8 million. Dennis Hof of the brothel was to receive half of the winning bid. A news report in May 2010 suggested that the episode may have been a hoax, although Hof insisted it was not. It also appears that the transaction was never consummated, as Hof stated: "It didn't work out, but she still made $250,000 out of the deal," referencing a $250,000 deposit put up by an Australian businessman who later backed out after reconciling with his ex-wife.

=== Raffaella Fico (not completed) ===
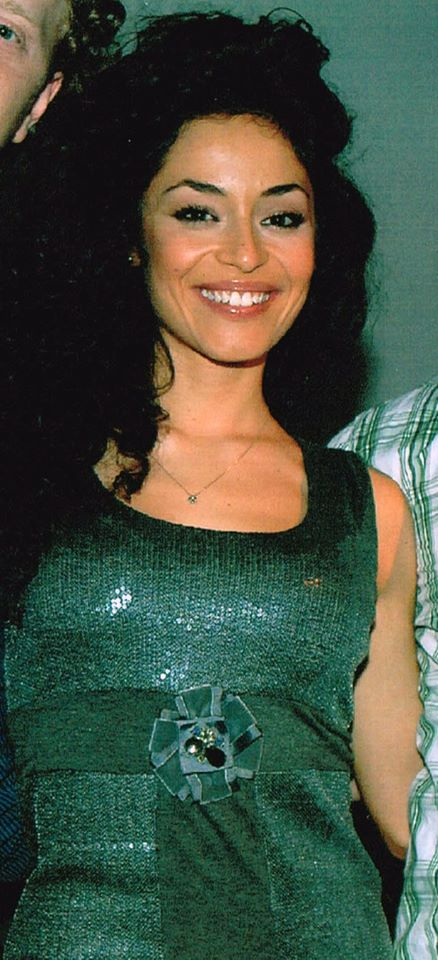
Italian model Raffaella Fico claimed in a 2008 interview that she would auction off her virginity, though the claim was not serious, and she never did so.

In September 2008, Italian model Raffaella Fico reported in an interview that she would auction off her virginity for one million Euros, but this appeared to be a publicity-seeking claim. When the Italian comedy show Le Iene sent actor Paolo Calabresi dressed up as a rich Arab sheik to offer Fico one million euros, Fico admitted the auction was only a provocation.

=== Alina Percea (claimed to be completed; virginity contested) ===
In May 2009, it was reported that 18-year-old Romanian Alina Percea had successfully auctioned her virginity for 10,000 euros to a 45-year-old Italian man, advertising the offer on a German dating site. She reportedly consummated the transaction in Venice, and took a morning-after pill the next day as the sex had been unprotected. She claimed to have been inspired by Natalie Dylan, and reported that she found herself attracted to the auction winner and enjoyed the experience. The woman denied claims made during the auction by a former teacher in Romania that she was not a virgin, and claimed two doctors had confirmed she was a virgin.

=== Gumtree girl (not completed) ===
In January 2010, the Belfast Telegraph responded to a virginity auction posted by a 16-year-old girl on the Gumtree trading site. A reporter met her after suggesting a £6,000 bid, but she claimed the entire episode was a "joke" after she was confronted.

=== Unigirl (likely hoax) ===
In early 2010, it was reported that an alleged 19-year-old New Zealand student, calling herself "unigirl", had sold her virginity for US$36,100. In January 2012, the New Zealand Herald reported that the auction appeared to have been a hoax.

=== Miss Spring (not completed) ===
In August 2010, a 17-year-old Hungarian woman (she turned 18 during the press coverage) using the online name "Miss Spring" was reported to have auctioned her virginity for £200,000 to a British man, to pay for family debts. Her original eBay listing was removed, and she reportedly declined the British winner's offer to marry her, and the auction was continued via a Hungarian television station (Tabu TV). However, the Austrian Times reported on 2 September that after being beaten by four men at her home in northern Hungary who threatened to rape her, she pulled out of the auction.

=== Noelle (not completed) ===
In May 2011, it was reported that a 21-year-old Belgian student named "Noelle" had auctioned off her virginity via an Amsterdam-based escort website for 50,000 euros. Previously it had been reported that she had received a bid of £1 million. In any event, it turned out the 50,000 euro bid from "a wealthy Italian businessman" was actually Italian actor Paolo Calabresi (who had debunked the Fico auction above). Calabresi met her while wearing a wire to determine if the auction was a scam. Though Calabresi seemed to think Noelle was genuine, she was at that point afraid of going through the auction due to all the press coverage. Noelle went back to her studies, and the escort agency said despite getting more inquiries, it was done with trying to auction virgins, saying "once was enough".

=== Catarina Migliorini (not completed) ===
In October 2012, it was reported that 20-year-old Brazilian Catarina Migliorini was selling her virginity, as a part of a planned documentary called Virgins Wanted by Australian director Justin Sisely. A male, Alex Stepanov, was also selling his virginity at a much lower price. Sisely had been in the news since 2010 about his attempts to make the documentary. Migliorini's buyer was reportedly a man from Japan at a price of $780,000. To avoid legal issues (as both Australian and Brazilian authorities had raised issues, according to Sisely), Sisely suggested the event might occur in a plane over international waters. Migliorini soon after appeared in the January 2013 issue of Playboy Brazil. In May 2013 Sisely announced the documentary was becoming a reality series, and that he was receiving hundreds of inquiries from people wanting to auction their virginity, but Migliorini announced soon after that the winner did not match Sisely's description, and that Sisely had tried to defraud her. The reality series is yet to be aired. A second auction Migliorini tried to conduct by herself in late 2013 was also unsuccessful. In early 2014 she was proposing a reality show in Brazil where 20 men would compete for $1 million, and her virginity.

=== Rebecca Bernardo (unknown outcome) ===
In November 2012, 18-year-old Rebecca Bernardo of Sapeaçu, Brazil, announced via a YouTube video that she would sell her virginity to the highest bidder to pay medical costs for her sick mother. She claimed to be inspired by Catarina Migliorini. A Brazilian TV station offered to pay the mother's medical expenses, but that deal fell through. As of January 2013, she reported she had received three bids, the highest at $35,000. As of March 2014, it was unknown what the outcome of the auction was.

=== Shatuniha (unknown outcome) ===
In October 2013, an 18-year-old Siberian woman calling herself "Shatuniha" posted an auction for her virginity on a Russian auction site. As of early November it was reported that she had received a bid for 900,000 rubles (about US$27,700), and that local police in Krasnoyarsk said no laws would be violated. At least one report stated that the same woman had appeared to sell her virginity on another site in April 2013 at age 17.

=== Elizabeth Raine (not completed) ===
In March 2014, an alleged 27-year-old American medical student using the name "Elizabeth Raine" announced she was auctioning her virginity, citing Dylan as an inspiration. Raine asserted that she had a privileged upbringing and no need for the money, but that the money was her primary motivation, and that she would give a portion to charity. Originally Raine only offered photos obscuring her face, but later released full photographs. The final bid was $801,000, but Raine had a change of heart and cancelled the auction on 8 May 2014, the day after its conclusion.

== See also ==
- Mizuage
- Pretty Baby (1978 film)
