= Pater Familias (film) =

- Directed by: Francesco Patierno
- Written by: Massimo Cacciapuoti; Francesco Patierno
- Starring: Luigi Iacuzio; Federica Bonavolontà; Francesco Pirozzi; Francesco Di Leva; Domenico Balsamo; Michelangelo Dalisi; Sergio Solli; Marina Suma; Ernesto Mahieux
- Cinematography: Mauro Marchetti
- Music by: Angelo Talocci
- Release date: 2003
- Language: Italian

Pater Familias is a 2003 Italian crime drama film written and directed by Francesco Patierno. It is based on the novel with the same name written by Massimo Cacciapuoti.

It was screened in the Panorama section at the 2003 Berlin Film Festival.

== Cast ==
- Antonella Migliore as Anna
- Luigi Jacuzio as Matteo
- Federica Bonavolontà as Rosa
- Francesco Pirozzi as Michele
- Francesco Di Leva as Gerardo
- Domenico Balsamo as Alessandro
- Marina Suma as Rosa's mother
- Sergio Solli as Rosa's father
- Ernesto Mahieux as Preside
