= Francesco Patierno =

Italian film director (born 1964)

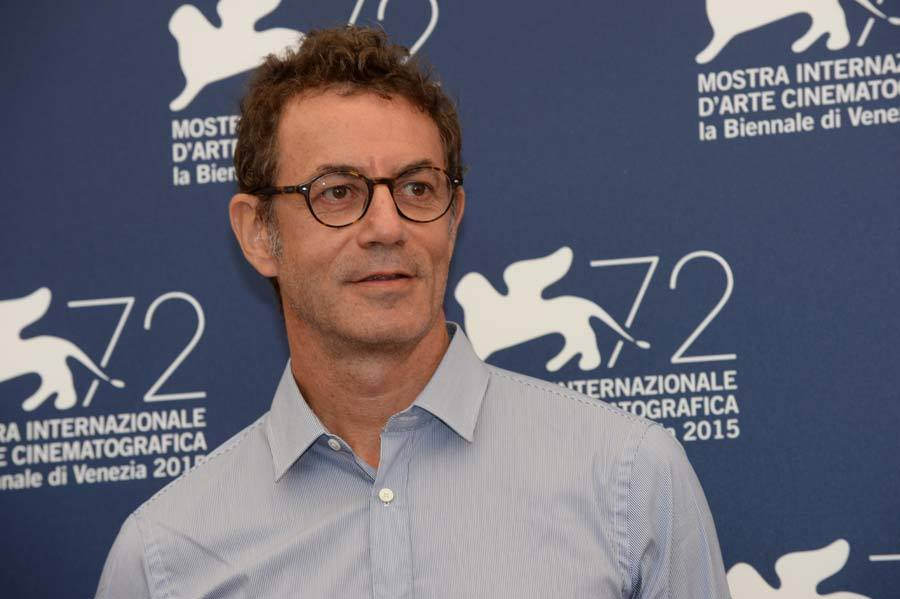
- Patierno in 2016
- Born: 24 April 1964 (age 61); Naples, Italy
- Occupation: Film director

Francesco Patierno (born 24 April 1964) is an Italian film director and screenwriter.

== Life and career ==
Born in Naples, Patierno studied architecture, and later became creative director of an advertising agency. After directing some commercials and music videos, in 1996 he directed the short Quel giorno, which was screened at the 53rd Venice International Film Festival.

In 2003, Patierno made his feature film debut with Pater Familias, which premiered in the Panorama section of the 53rd Berlin International Film Festival. The film got him a David di Donatello nomination for best directorial debut and a Nastro d'Argento in the same category. His following film The Early Bird Catches the Worm was entered into the main competition at the 2008 Karlovy Vary International Film Festival.

In 2011, Patierno's film Things from Another World premiered at the 68th Venice International Film Festival. In 2017, his documentary Naples '44 won the Nastro d'Argento for best documentary film.

== Filmography ==
=== Films ===
- Pater Familias (2003)
- The Early Bird Catches the Worm (2008)
- Things from Another World (2011)
- People Who Are Well (2014)
- Naples '44 (2016)
- Diva! (2017)
- La cura (2022)
- Improvvisamente Natale (2022)
- Svegliami a mezzanotte (2022)
- Improvvisamente a Natale mi sposo (2023)

=== Television ===
- Donne assassine – TV-series, 4 episodes (2008)
