= Counterpunch =

Counterpunch can refer to:

- Counterpunch (boxing), a punch in boxing
- CounterPunch, a political magazine
- Counterpunch (typography), a type of punch used in traditional typography
- Punch/Counterpunch, a fictional character in The Transformers
- Counterpuncher, a tennis strategy
- Wade Hixton's Counter Punch, a boxing game for the Game Boy Advance
- Operation Counterpunch, a military offensive during the Laotian Civil War
- CounterPunch (film), a Netflix Original documentary directed by Jay Bulger
