= Fear and Loathing in Aspen =

2021 American biopic film

- Directed by: Robert F. Kennedy III
- Written by: Robert F. Kennedy III
- Produced by: Stephen Nemeth
- Starring: Jay Bulger; Cheryl Hines
- Cinematography: Mark David; Ian Quill
- Music by: Wayne Kramer; John Paul Roney; The Futurebirds
- Production companies: Shout! Studios; Rhino Films; Pluribus
- Release date: 23 July 2021
- Running time: 81 minutes
- Country: United States
- Language: English
- Budget: $250,000

Fear and Loathing in Aspen is a 2021 American biopic drama film written and directed by Robert F. Kennedy III and produced by Stephen Nemeth. The film is based on the American late journalist Hunter S. Thompson, and his run for sheriff of Aspen. The film began production in September 2018, and the film was released in July 2021.

== Premise ==
The film is set in the 1970's, and revolves around the late American author and journalist Hunter S. Thompson, who becomes fed up with local pollution problems in Aspen, Colorado. As such, he decides to go and run for sheriff of Aspen.

== Cast ==
- Jay Bulger as Hunter S. Thompson
- Cheryl Hines as Eve Homeyer
- Amaryllis Fox as Peggy Clifford
- Charlie Oldman as Hippie
- Laird Macintosh as Sheriff Carol Whitmire

== History ==
=== Production ===
Production for the film began in September 2018. The budget was set with $250,000. Originally, it was set with $1.85 million, but due to the non-government money being promised by Sony, The budget was reduced.

The film was later acquired by Shout! Studios, and was later titled Fear and Loathing in Aspen. Mark David and Ian Quill were credited as cinematographers for the film. The music was written by Wayne Kramer, John Paul Roney, and The Futurebirds. The film was also produced by Rhino Films and Pluribus.

=== Release ===
The film released on July 23, 2021 in limited theatres such as Movieland and El Jebel. The film was then released on digital demand on August 31, 2021.

== Reception ==
The film received generally positive reviews from film critics. Review aggregator Rotten Tomatoes gave a score of 60% critic approval. Regan Bervar of the Glendale Cherry Creek Chronicle said that the film was "indie filmmaking at its finest", and praised the film for its feels of the 1990's. Anthony Francis from the Screen Comment praised Bulger in his portrayal as Thompson.
