= Beware of Mr. Baker =

2012 film by Jay Bulger

- Film poster
- Directed by: Jay Bulger
- Written by: Jay Bulger
- Produced by: Jay Bulger; Andrew S. Karsch; Fisher Stevens; Erik H. Gordon
- Starring: Ginger Baker
- Cinematography: Eric Robbins
- Edited by: Abhay Sofsky
- Production companies: Insurgent Media; Pugilist at Rest Productions
- Distributed by: SnagFilms
- Release dates: 10 March 2012 (South by Southwest); 28 November 2012 (United States)
- Running time: 92 minutes
- Country: United States
- Language: English

Beware of Mr. Baker is a 2012 American documentary film by Jay Bulger about the jazz and rock drummer Ginger Baker.

== Background ==
For Bulger's article "The Devil and Ginger Baker" in Rolling Stone magazine, Bulger lived with Baker in South Africa where Baker had spent the previous decade living in seclusion. The article and the numerous hours of interviews Bulger captured on film became the premise for the film, and in the spring of 2010, Bulger returned to South Africa with a small film crew to finish making the film. It premiered at the 2012 South by Southwest Film Festival and won the Grand Jury Prize for Best Documentary. The title is a reference to a sign outside his South African compound, and also indicative of Baker's combative personality displayed in the film.

== Reception ==
Rotten Tomatoes gave the documentary film an approval rating of 98% based on 48 reviews; the average rating is 7.8/10. The consensus reads, "Free of the hagiographic overtones that dog many documentary profiles, Beware of Mr. Baker presents a clear-eyed, thoroughly gripping look at one of rock's greatest – and most personally problematic – musicians." The film won several awards and was nominated for the 'Grierson Award' at the 2012 London Film Festival.

Baker said of the film himself, "Some of it is very good and some of it is very annoying." He elaborated that he was frustrated with the inclusion of some of the people on the film but was pleased to see Eric Clapton and Charlie Watts had taken part.
