= Dalida (2016 film) =

- Theatrical release poster
- Directed by: Lisa Azuelos
- Written by: Lisa Azuelos; Orlando (collaboration)
- Produced by: Julien Madon; Lisa Azuelos; Jérôme Seydoux
- Starring: Sveva Alviti; Riccardo Scamarcio; Jean-Paul Rouve; Nicolas Duvauchelle
- Cinematography: Antoine Sanier
- Edited by: Thomas Fernandez
- Music by: Jeanne Trellu; Jaco Zijlstra
- Production companies: Bethsabée Mucho; Pathé Production; TF1 Films Production; Umedia; Universal Music Publishing Group
- Distributed by: Pathé Distribution
- Release dates: 30 November 2016 (Paris premiere); 11 January 2017 (United States)
- Running time: 124 minutes
- Country: France
- Languages: French; Italian; English; Arabic; German
- Budget: $17 million
- Box office: $5.6 million

Dalida is a 2016 French biographical drama film about the life of singer and actress Dalida. It is written, directed and co-produced by Lisa Azuelos, and stars Sveva Alviti as Dalida.

== Plot ==
In 1967 Dalida goes to a hotel and unsuccessfully attempts suicide. Rushing to her side during recovery are her ex-husband Lucien Morisse, her ex-lover Jean Sobieski and her brother Orlando (born Bruno). The three men explain different facets of Dalida's personality: Dalida grew up a passionate music lover thanks to her violinist father in Cairo but always felt herself to be ugly because of the large glasses she wore. She was discovered in Paris by Lucien Morisse, a Parisian radio programmer who eventually fell for her and left his wife for her. Dalida became disillusioned with Morisse when he put off marriage and a child to focus on building her career. Nevertheless, she married him, but quickly began an affair with artist Jean Sobieski. She eventually left Sobieski as well, to have an affair with Luigi Tenco, a temperamental musician. Luigi commits suicide after having a breakdown and walking off stage at the 1967 Sanremo Music Festival. Dalida finds his body and it is this her friends and family believe has contributed to her mental breakdown and suicide attempt.

With the help of her brother Dalida recovers and begins to record new music and find new loves. Going to Italy to perform, she encounters a young 22-year-old student and the two embark upon a love affair. Discovering she is pregnant Dalida decides not to keep the child as she feels her lover is too young to be a responsible parent and that she does not want to raise a child without a father. She has an abortion and breaks things off with her lover.

Dalida's brother Orlando begins to manage her career causing a new period of success for her. Lucien Morisse meanwhile commits suicide in their old apartment.

Dalida is introduced to media personality Richard Chanfray (Nicolas Duvauchelle) and the two begin a relationship. Dalida feels safe and secure for the first time in her life, but eventually their relationship begins to crumble. Richard accidentally shoots the boyfriend of her housekeeper believing he is an intruder and Dalida is forced to pay off the family to keep him out of jail. After Richard gets jealous of her career, she records an album with him despite the fact that he is a poor singer. Dalida believes she is pregnant only to learn her abortion destroyed her uterus and any chance she may have had of becoming pregnant. At a New Year's Eve party after Richard is unpleasant to her and publicly mocks her eating disorder, Dalida finally kicks him out of her life. Sometime after he commits suicide as well.

Her career doing better than ever, Dalida acts in the film Le Sixième Jour to much acclaim and returns to Egypt where she is feted by the people. Nevertheless, she dissolves into a deep depression, becoming a shut-in with her bulimia spiralling out of control. She finally commits suicide leaving behind a note explaining that life is too difficult.

== Cast ==
- Sveva Alviti as Dalida
  - Elena Rapisarda as young Dalida
- Riccardo Scamarcio as Orlando
  - Davide Lorino as elder Orlando
- Jean-Paul Rouve as Lucien Morisse
- Nicolas Duvauchelle as Richard Chanfray
- Alessandro Borghi as Luigi Tenco
- Valentina Carli as Rosy
- Brenno Placido as Lucio
- Niels Schneider as Jean Sobieski
- Hamarz Vasfi as Pietro Gigliotti
- F. Haydee Borelli as Giuseppina Gigliotti
- Vincent Perez as Eddie Barclay
- Patrick Timsit as Bruno Coquatrix
- Michaël Cohen as Arnaud Desjardins
- Laurent Bateau as The psychologist

== Production ==
Principal photography took place from 8 February to 22 April 2016, in France, Italy and Morocco.

== Reception ==
In a statement to the Agence France-Presse, Catherine Morisse, the daughter of Lucien Morisse, criticised the film for the inaccurate portrayal of her father, adding that she was not consulted during the film's production.
