= Mulu (company) =

- Website type: Social networking service
- Founded: September 2011; 15 years ago

Mulu was an online social network enabling users to share product recommendations and direct a percentage of the resulting revenue to themselves or a charity of their choosing. Users can share their own recommendations or browse recommendations from other users, including celebrities. Purchases made based on mulu recommendations benefit either the user who made the recommendation or the charity of their choosing. Users can choose from charities that include Greenpeace, Doctors without Borders, St. Jude Children's Research Hospital, and the Lance Armstrong Foundation. In February 2012, Mulu was included in Mashable's list of "10 Hot Startups Changing the Face of Retail". Mulu was nominated for a Webby Award in the Fashion category on 10 April 2012, alongside Vogue.com and The New York Times.

== History ==
Work on Mulu began in September, 2011, and the site was launched in beta at South by Southwest in Austin, Texas, in March, 2012. Mulu Founder Amaryllis Fox credited a background in the nonprofit sector and an epiphany at a Philip Glass concert in Edinburgh, Scotland, for the original idea. In April, 2012, Mulu was nominated for a Webby Award in the Fashion category, alongside Vogue.com and The New York Times.

== Usage ==
Visitors to Mulu can browse the recommendations of other users and celebrities without joining the site. When they click through to purchase an item from an online retailer, the retailer sends a portion of the resulting revenue back to Mulu, which distributes it to the recommending user or the charity of his or her choice. Visitors can sign up for a Mulu account using their email address or Facebook account. Once a Mulu user, they are able to create their own recommendations by using Mulu to navigate to the webpage of any online retailer or by installing a bookmarklet to their browser and navigating to a retailer's page outside of Mulu.

Users are also able to ask and answer questions about products, fashion, interiors, tech, home improvement, books, crafts, and any other product that can be bought online. Answers are search engine optimized to appear in search engine results.

Mulu announced plans to release an iOS app in 2012.

== Business ==
Mulu's business model is centered around splitting affiliate revenue with users and users' charities. In February, 2012, Forbes highlighted this model as a transparent alternative to other social sharing sites collecting affiliate revenue without disclosing or splitting with users.

Mulu founder and CEO Amaryllis Fox described Mulu's mission as: "We're trying to use peoples' good taste in gadgets, books or shoes to help build health clinics in Sudan." Fox is a veteran of aid work along the Thai-Burmese border.
