= Kaj Larsen =

American journalist

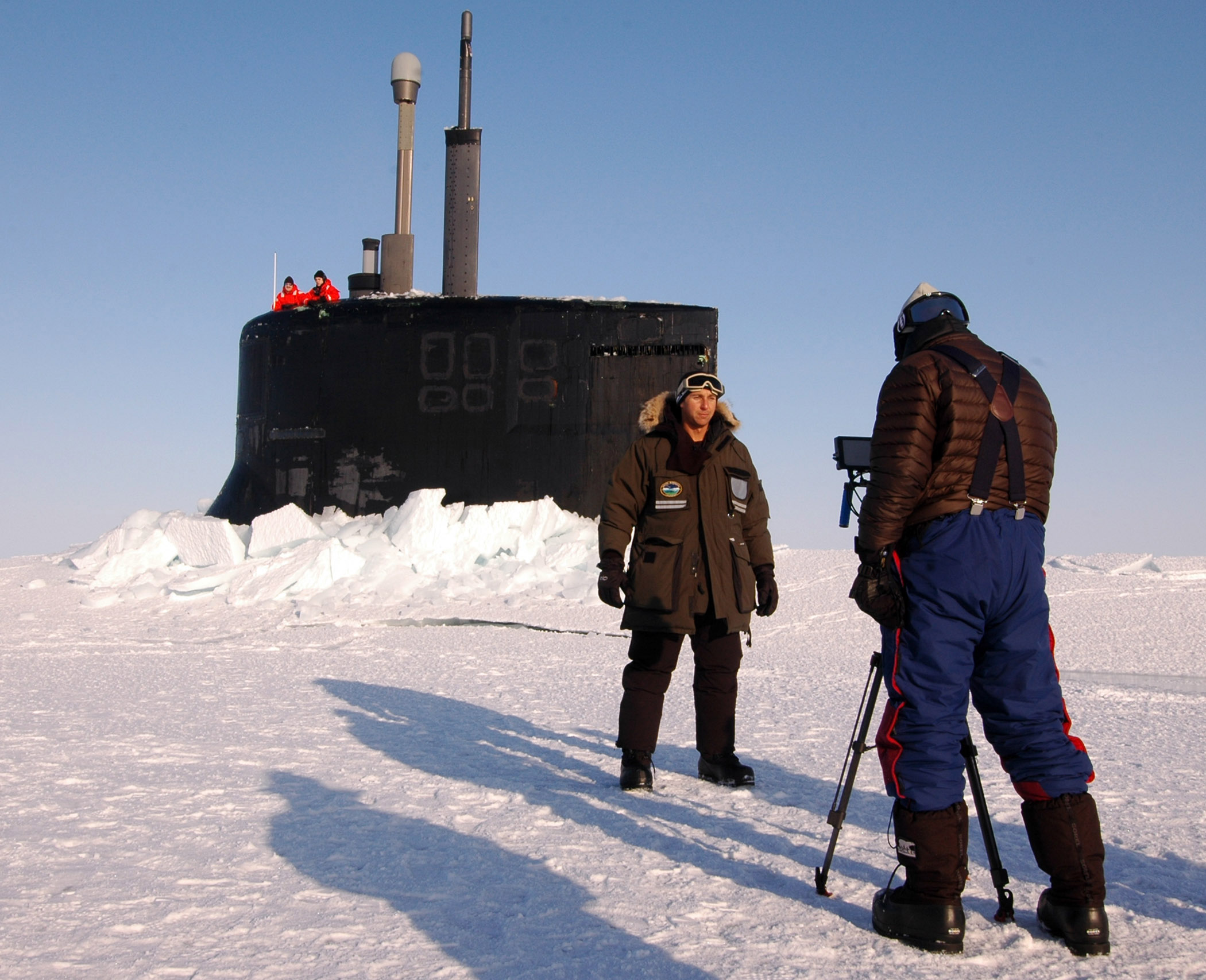
- Born: 1978 (age 47–48); Santa Cruz, California, U.S.
- Education: University of California, Santa Cruz (BA); Harvard University (MPP, 2007)
- Occupations: Journalist; correspondent; producer
- Years active: 2005–present
- Website: www.kajlarsen.com

Kaj Larsen /ˈkɑːdʒ/ (born 1978) is an American journalist, correspondent, and producer who has worked for Vice News, CNN, NowThis News and Current TV. He worked for the Vanguard international news documentary investigative reporting show on Current TV beginning in 2005. He produced the documentary series LOCKUP Maricopa County and LOCKUP RAW for MSNBC from 2010 to 2011. In 2010, he became a producer and correspondent for CNN until he was laid off in 2012 after CNN abolished their investigative news departments. Following CNN he became a correspondent for VICE News and hosted the series VICE on HBO. In 2016, Larsen hosted “The Runner” original series with Executive producers Matt Damon and Ben Affleck. He was the senior correspondent for NowThis News.

Larsen has covered international and domestic conflict, including stories about waterboarding, ebola outbreaks, drug trafficking, Boko Haram, Somalia, and the militarization of the Arctic.

== Early life ==
Larsen was born in Santa Cruz, California. His father was formerly a U.S. Marine. He initially attended the United States Naval Academy where he played water polo, but he transferred to the University of California, Santa Cruz after two years. He originally aspired to be a Naval Aviator, having taken flying lessons growing up. He graduated from the University of California, Santa Cruz with a degree in political science and later received a master's degree in public policy from the Harvard Kennedy School, where he was awarded a fellowship from the Joan Shorenstein Center on the Press, Politics and Public Policy. He was also a joint fellow at Tufts University Jebsen Center for Counter-Terrorism studies.

== Career ==
=== Military career ===
Larsen enlisted in the United States Navy in 2001 and attended Basic Training at Recruit Training Command Great Lakes, Illinois. He volunteered and received orders for Basic Underwater Demolition/SEAL training (BUD/S) at Naval Amphibious Base Coronado. After months of training, Larsen graduated from BUD/S class 237. After BUD/S, he completed advanced training courses including parachute training at Basic Airborne School, cold weather combat training in Kodiak, Alaska, and six months of SEAL Qualification Training (SQT) in Coronado, California. Larsen received the Navy Enlisted Classification (NEC) 5326 as a Combatant Swimmer (SEAL), entitled to wear the Special Warfare Insignia. Larsen is a combat veteran Navy SEAL who served in the war on terror during Operation Enduring Freedom. After his five-year active duty service Larsen stayed in the US Naval Reserves earning the rank of Lieutenant Commander, and was assigned as a Maritime operations officer at Special Operations Command Africa.

=== Journalism ===
Larsen‘s career in journalism began in 2005 when he joined Current TV, a cable channel created by former Vice President Al Gore. While at Current TV, Larsen volunteered to have himself waterboarded on TV in an effort to help viewers understand the controversial interrogation technique. Larsen, who had previously been waterboarded during military survival training told the interviewer the technique induced panic and felt, "like having a hot coal in your chest that you can't get out." In 2007, during the controversial hearings for the confirmation of Michael Mukasey as United States Attorney General, the video of Larsen being waterboarded video was widely circulated. Reporting for VICE News in 2013, Larsen conducted the first on camera interview with James Elmer Mitchell, whose firm Mitchell Jessen and Associates received $81 million on contract from the CIA to carry out debriefings of detainees and to develop and conduct enhanced interrogation techniques, including waterboarding. Mitchell had previously been identified by pseudonym in the Senate Intelligence Committee report on CIA torture.

Larsen helped develop the Vanguard journalism series, which received an Emmy Award. He has reported from Yemen, Cambodia, Colombia and Haiti. Larsen also reported on arms trafficking in Mogadishu, Somalia.

In 2010, Larsen joined CNN as a correspondent for the Special Investigations and Documentary Unit covering the drug war in Mexico, the floods in Pakistan and WikiLeaks. He has appeared as a guest on ABC, NBC, MSNBC, and The Huffington Post. He was the senior correspondent and host of Current TV's The Current Election and has consulted on Aaron Sorkin's HBO fictional news program The Newsroom. As a producer Larsen worked on US Navy Pirate Hunters, a one-hour special for Spike TV, and Lockup, the MSNBC show about life in an American prison. He has received an Emmy nomination, a Peabody nomination, two Telly Awards, and several Golden Cine Awards. A two time national champion open-water swimmer, he placed third in the Escape from Alcatraz duathalon. He helped launch The Mission Continues, providing fellowships to veterans, and continues to serve on the group's board of directors. He is close friends with Eric Greitens as both served together in Iraq.

Larsen began working as a bureau Chief for VICE News is 2014. The same year, 276 school girls were kidnapped by Boko Haram in Nigeria. Larsen traveled to Nigeria to embed with the Nigerian military and report on Boko Haram's effect on the region. In a series of reports for VICE and VICE HBO Larsen documented the conflict between the Nigerian Army and Boko Haram by observing firefights and interviewing victims as well as combatants on both sides. Larsen left Vice News in 2016. The following year he was included in an article detailing a culture of harassment at VICE news. Larsen's name was added to a list of influential people from a variety of industries who have faced public accusations of harassment.

In 2019, Larsen appeared on The Fighter and the Kid podcast with Bryan Callen to discuss his career in journalism, including being waterboarded on TV and being embedded in Nigeria.

=== Netflix series ===
Larsen created and served as the executive producer for the 2020 Netflix documentary series The Business of Drugs, which tracks the economics of the international narcotics trade.

=== Veteran services and philanthropy ===
Larsen has served on the board of advisors of Team Rubicon, a veteran service organization that uses disaster response to help veterans transition to civilian life. In addition to serving on the board, Larsen has deployed with Team Rubicon on humanitarian missions to Pakistan and the Philippines to aid those affected by natural disasters.

Larsen was the keynote speaker at the Cupertino Veterans Day dedication of the statue of Matt Axelson and James Suh, two SEALs Larsen had served with, who were killed in action during Operation Red Wings in June 2005.

On June 6, 2018 Larsen and a group of current and former SEALs recreated the original D-day mission of the U.S. Navy Combat Demolition Units, swimming seven miles across the English Channel followed by a 30 kilometer march from Normandy to Saint-Lô. The event was completed to raise money for the Navy SEAL Heritage Museum in Fort Pierce, Florida. Later in 2018, during the Woolsey Fire in California, Larsen used a private yacht to stage rescue missions in Malibu, delivering supplies and aid to first responders and evacuating residents by paddling back and forth between the yacht and the shore 30 times.
