= The Business of Drugs =

2020 documentary streaming television miniseries

- Genre: Documentary; Crime
- Presented by: Amaryllis Fox
- Music by: Paul Brill
- Country of origin: United States
- Original language: English (Note: With some interviews in Spanish, Swahili, Burmese, Shan and Thai.)
- No. of seasons: 1
- No. of episodes: 6

Production
- Executive producers: Christopher Collins; Lydia Tenaglia; Erik Osterholm; Kaj Larsen; BJ Levin; John X. Kim
- Producers: Leila Abu-Saada; Gillian Brown; Liz Fields; Beth Morrissey
- Cinematography: Frederic Menou
- Editors: Kimberly Tomes; Andrew Ford; Mustafa Bhagat; Alex Keipper
- Running time: 39–46 minutes
- Production companies: Zero Point Zero Production; Universal Content Productions

Original release
- Network: Netflix
- Release: July 14, 2020

The Business of Drugs is a 2020 American crime documentary streaming television miniseries.

== Host ==
- Amaryllis Fox

== Episodes ==
| No. | Title | Directed by | Original release date |
|---|---|---|---|
| 1 | "Cocaine" | Jesse Sweet | July 14, 2020 |
| 2 | "Synthetics" | Nick Carew | July 14, 2020 |
| 3 | "Heroin" | Erik Osterholm | July 14, 2020 |
| 4 | "Meth" | Erik Osterholm | July 14, 2020 |
| 5 | "Cannabis" | Eric Strauss | July 14, 2020 |
| 6 | "Opioids" | Jesse Sweet | July 14, 2020 |

== Release ==
The Business of Drugs was released on July 14, 2020 on Netflix.
