= Curtain Call (1998 film) =

1999 film by Peter Yates

Curtain Call (It All Came True)
- Directed by: Peter Yates
- Written by: Andrew S. Karsch; Todd Alcott
- Produced by: Andrew S. Karsch
- Starring: James Spader; Michael Caine; Maggie Smith; Polly Walker
- Cinematography: Sven Nykvist
- Edited by: Hughes Winborne
- Music by: Richard Hartley
- Production company: Longfellow Productions
- Distributed by: Ardustry
- Release date: December 5, 1998 (US)
- Running time: 94 minutes
- Country: United States
- Language: English

Curtain Call is a 1998 romantic comedy directed by Peter Yates, photographed by Sven Nykvist and edited by Hughes Winborne. It stars James Spader, Polly Walker, Michael Caine and Maggie Smith. The film was later re-released under the title It All Came True. It was to be Peter Yates' last film made for cinema, although in most markets it went directly to TV or home video.

== Plot ==
Stevenson Lowe (James Spader) has a publishing business that's in trouble and a girlfriend (Polly Walker), who is also being pursued by a U.S. Senator (Sam Shepard). Stevenson buys a townhouse, for himself, which disappoints her. A pair of quarrelsome ghosts, Max Gale (Michael Caine) and Lily Marlowe (Maggie Smith), who once worked in the theatre, now quarrel with each other while advising Stevenson why marriage is a bad idea.

== Cast ==
- James Spader as Stevenson Lowe
- Polly Walker as Julia
- Michael Caine as Max Gale
- Maggie Smith as Lily Marlowe
- Buck Henry as Charles Van Allsburg
- Sam Shepard as Will Dodge
- Frank Whaley as Brett Conway
- Marcia Gay Harden as Michelle Tippet
- Frances Sternhagen as Amy
- Phyllis Somerville as Gladys
- Julianne Nicholson as Sandra Hewson
- Susan Berman as Miriam

== See also ==
- List of American films of 1998
