= Sveva Alviti =

Italian actress and former model

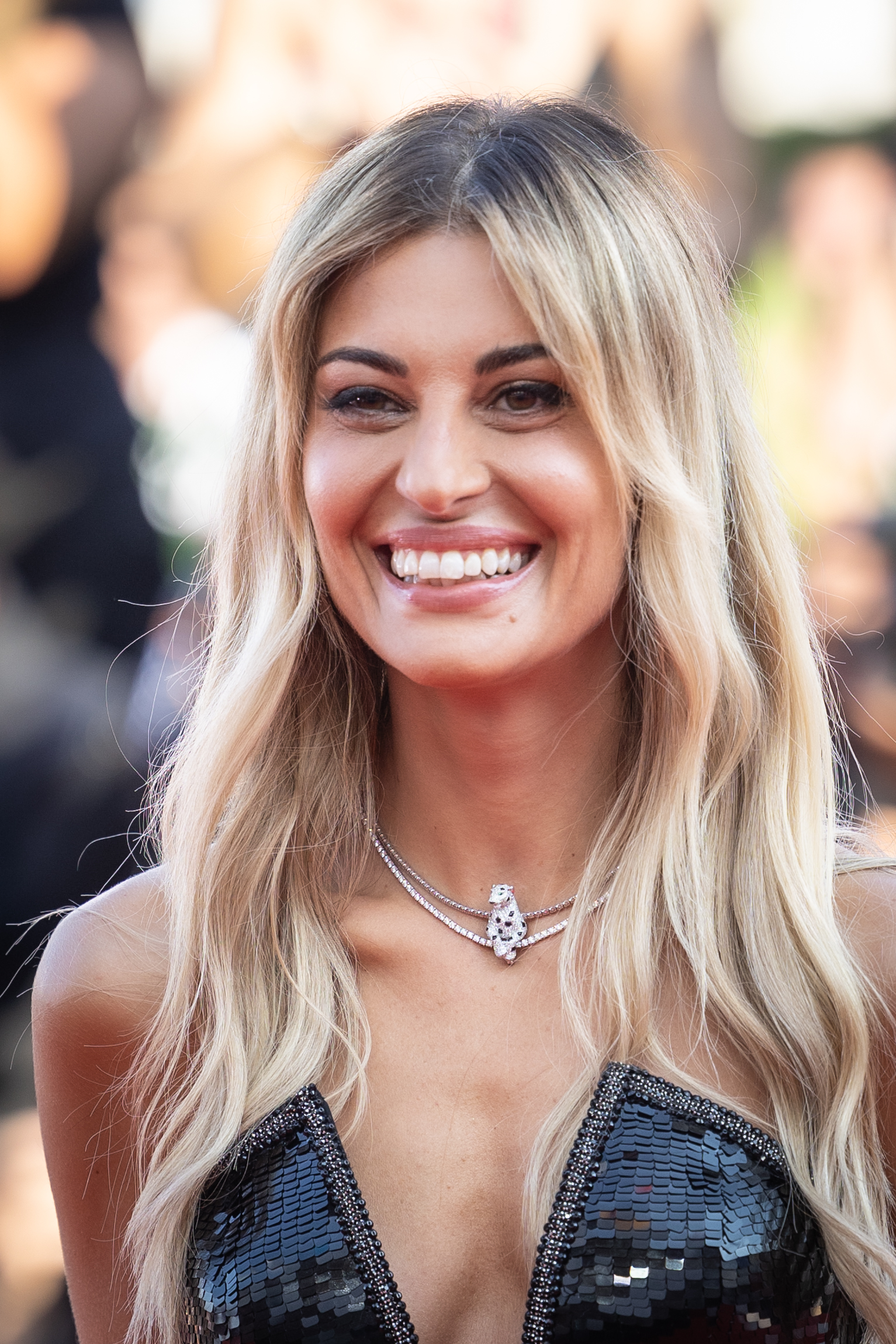
- Alviti in 2024
- Born: July 14, 1984 (age 41); Rome, Italy
- Occupations: Actress; model
- Known for: Dalida
- Partner: Anthony Delon (2019–2023)

Sveva Alviti (born July 14, 1984) is an Italian actress and former model who works in Italian and French-language films.

== Early life and career ==
Alviti was born July 14, 1984, in Rome, Italy and grew up there. Alviti participated in the 2001 Model Elite Look fashion contest in Italy, placing second. She then went to New York, where she studied acting while modelling, She lived there for seven years. As a model, she has appeared in many parades and ad campaigns. During her modeling career, she lived in Singapore, Argentina, Thailand, and Hong Kong.

In an interview, Alviti stated that she "doesn't do modeling anymore", and that she is "just doing photo-shoots for film promotions. It is more celebrity shoots, before I was really modeling, now it is different."

=== Acting ===
In 2012, Alviti made her debut acting in the film AmeriQua in a minor role, In 2013, she was cast in the Italian-language films Niente può fermarci and Out of the Blue in minor roles, in 2014, she was cast in the film Cam Girl in the lead role.

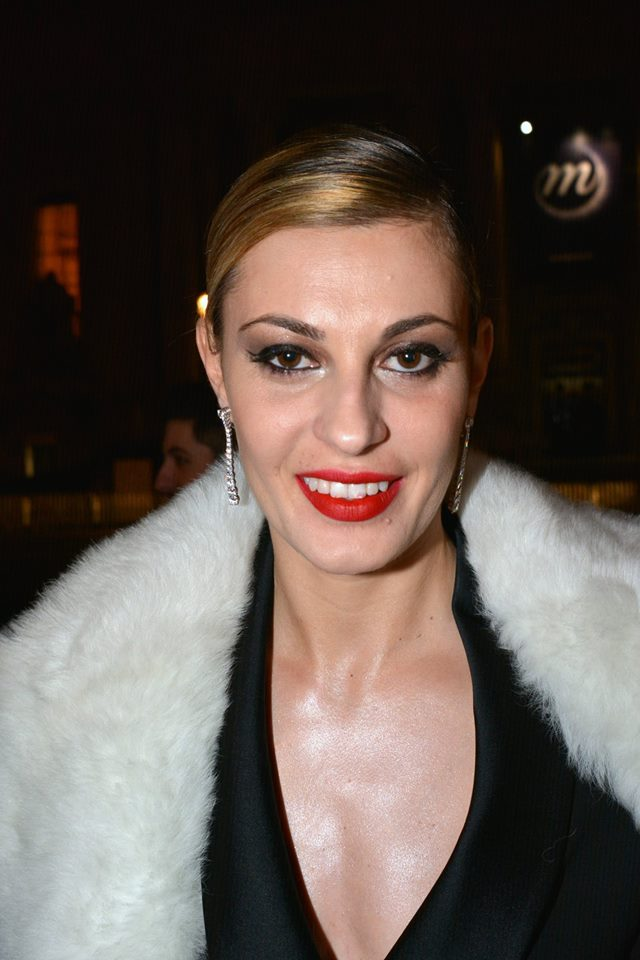
Alviti at the 2018 César revelations dinner

Alviti's most well-known role came with the 2017 French-language biographical film Dalida, directed by Lisa Azuelos, Based on the life of the actress and singer Dalida, played by Alviti. Although the film is a French-language film, Alviti did not speak French before doing her role. She did six-hour French lessons a day, saying, "A lot of days I was crying and ready to give up." She learned the language in six months. Her performance in the film was met with critical acclaim. In 2018, her role in the film earned her to be cited in the pre-selection of the Best Actress at the 43rd César Awards, However, She was not among the finalists and was not nominated for the award.

in that year, Alviti appeared in three films: Love Addict, Restiamo Amici and The Bouncer, in 2019, she appeared in Tra le onde in a minor role as Lea.

=== Other activities ===
Alviti hosted the 81st Venice International Film Festival in 2024.

== Personal life ==
Alviti was in a relationship with actor Anthony Delon, they began dating in July 2019. in September 2020, they announced their engagement during an interview with Paris Match magazine. In 2021, Delon announced that they broke off their engagement. However, they later appeared together at the premiere of the film « Entre les vagues » in March 2022. They separated in 2023.

== Filmography ==
Year	Film	Role	Notes
2012	AmeriQua	Blonde girl	Minor role
2013	Niente può fermarci		Minor role
2013	Buongiorno papà	ragazza mora	Minor role
2014	Cam Girl	Gilda	Lead role
2017	Dalida	Dalida	Debut French-language film
2018	Love Addict	Henriette	French-language film
2018	Restiamo Amici	Marta Rossi	Italian-language film
2018	The Bouncer	Lisa Zaccherini	French-language film
2019	Tra le onde	Lea	Italian-language film
2021	Entre les vagues	Kristin	French-language film
