= AmeriQua =

2012 film by Giovanni Consonni and Marco Bellone

- Film poster
- Directed by: Giovanni Consonni, Marco Bellone
- Written by: Matteo Bortolotti; Robert F. Kennedy III; Caterina Mazzuccato
- Produced by: Marco Gualtieri; Anthony Mancilla; Alessandro Penazzi; (executive producers): Francesco Melzi d’Eril; Minnie Ferrara
- Starring: Robert F. Kennedy III; Alessandra Mastronardi; Eva Amurri; Lele Gabellone; Alec Baldwin; Giancarlo Giannini; Matteo Azchirvani; Gianluca Bazzoli; Michele Bottini; Valentina Correani; Antonia Dell'Atte; Vito Facciolla; Marin Jo Finerty; Jeanene Fox; Ernesto Mahieux; Edoardo Pesce; Giuseppe Sanfelice; Enrico Silvestrin
- Cinematography: Marco Bassano
- Edited by: Consuelo Catucci
- Music by: Lucio Dalla
- Production companies: Jabadoo, Man In Hat
- Distributed by: The Little Film Company; UCI Cinemas, The Space Cinema
- Release dates: 10 February 2012 (Berlin); 14 March 2013 (Milan); July 2013 (US)
- Running time: 99 minutes
- Countries: Italy, US
- Languages: English, Italian
- Budget: €3,488,804–€4,000,000
- Box office: €26,500 (Italy)

AmeriQua (retitled EuroTrapped for home media and streaming) is a 2012 Italian-American romantic comedy road movie filmed in English and Italian, directed by Giovanni Consonni and Marco Bellone, their debut feature, starring Robert F. Kennedy III, who also wrote the original screenplay, loosely based on his experiences during his time in Italy. The film's ensemble cast includes Alessandra Mastronardi, Eva Amurri, Alec Baldwin, and Giancarlo Giannini, as well as non-professional actors.

== Plot ==
Charlie (Bobby Kennedy) is an American hard-partying slacker and recent college graduate whose wealthy parents (Alec Baldwin and Catherine Mary Stewart) cut him off with a cheque for $5000 and an ultimatum to get a job. Instead, eager to explore Europe, he buys a plane ticket to Italy. On the plane, he meets the self-proclaimed "King" of Bologna, Lele (Lele Gabellone), who tells him he is welcome to stay with him, also making a strong impression by joining the mile high club with the woman he just met, Alessia (Valentina Correani).

Just out of the airport in Rome, Charlie is accosted and robbed by three Neapolitan mafia men: Vito (Vito Facciolla), Jaroslav (Matteo Azchirvani), and "Il Nero" (Edoardo Pesce). Charlie manages to get away from them, fleeing in their pickup truck. Not knowing what else to do (he speaks no Italian and has nowhere to go), he heads to Bologna to take the "King" up on his offer.

Lele takes Charlie under his wing and introduces him to his eccentric group of friends, like Badoo (Gianlucca Bazzoli), a scraggly "gutter punk" (punkabbestia), and "Il Pisa" (Giuseppe Sanfelice), an insatiable whoremonger. Charlie moves in and picks up where he left off in the US, living each day as if it were his last. Lele teaches Charlie the subtle techniques of Italian seduction, throws all-night parties, and generally causes chaos. Charlie is a good student and meets and charms two lovely ladies, the dangerously beautiful Valentina (Alessandra Mastronardi) and all-American beauty Vicky (Eva Amurri).

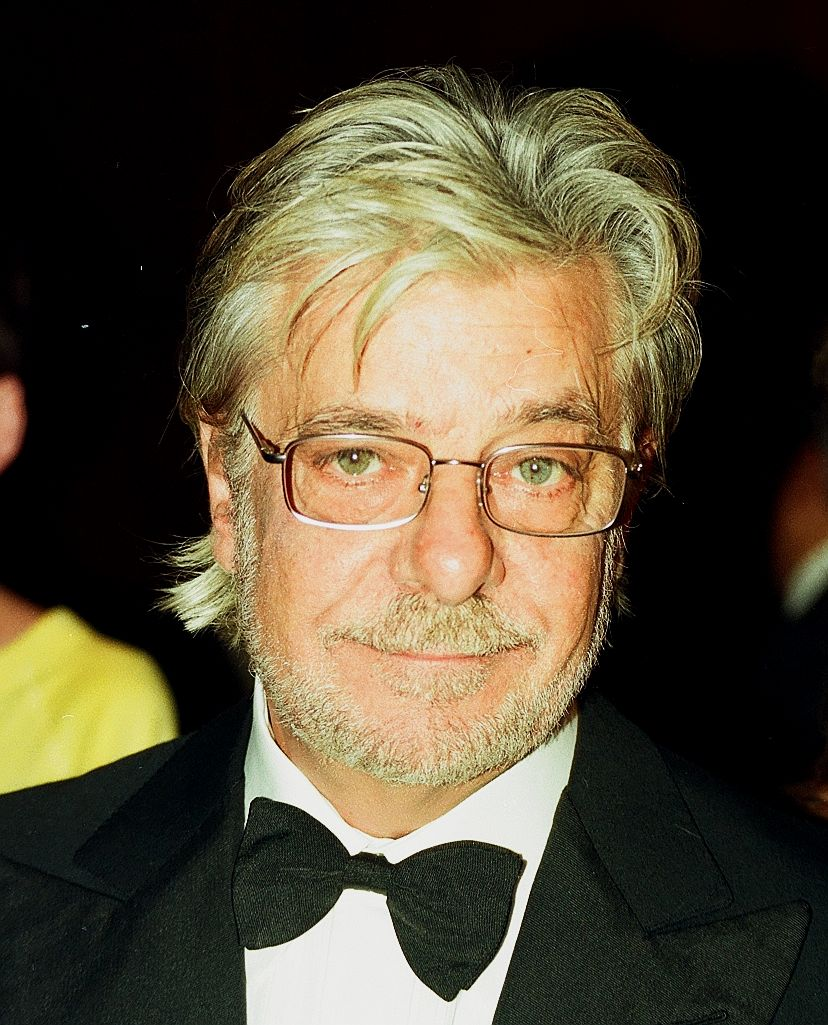
Giancarlo Giannini in 2000

Thanks to Charlie's swaggering immaturity and some cultural misunderstanding, he incurs the wrath of mafiosi Don Ferracane (Giancarlo Giannini), Valentina's father, and Don Farina (Ernesto Mahieux) the boss of the three men Charlie clashed with in Rome. It turns out the van Charlie escaped in had something important belonging to the ill-tempered Don Farina, who, exasperated with his underboss Vito, threatens to kill him unless he produces results. Vito threatens Jaroslav and Il Nero in turn and the trio finally track Charlie to Bologna...

== Cast ==
Main

- Bobby Kennedy III as Charlie Edwards
- Alessandra Mastronardi as Valentina
- Eva Amurri as Vicky
- Lele Gabellone as Lele
- Alec Baldwin as Mr. Edwards
- Giancarlo Giannini as Don Cesare Ferracane
- Matteo Azchirvani as Jaroslav
- Gianluca Bazzoli as Badoo
- Michele Bottini as Sergio
- Valentina Correani as Alessia
- Antonia Dell'Atte as Vittoria Ferracane
- Vito Facciolla as Vito
- Marin Jo Finerty as Elsy
- Jeanene Fox as Jenny
- Ernesto Mahieux as Don Farina
- Edoardo Pesceas as Il Nero
- Giuseppe Sanfelice as Il Pisa
- Enrico Silvestrin as Carmine

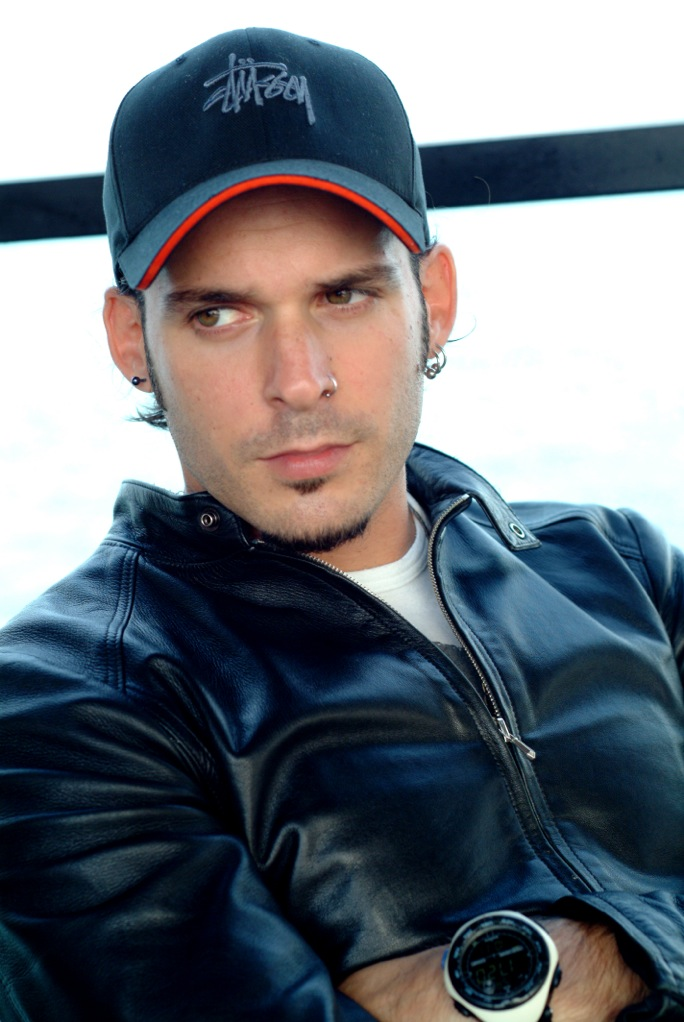
Enrico Silvestrin

Supporting

- Catherine Mary Stewart as Mrs. Edwards
- Prentice Onayemi as Heavy Williams
- Alberto Tonti as Mr. Whittaker
- Matteo Taranto as Giampaolo
- Debora Antonacci as Elena
- Elliott Brooks as Mrs. Edwards' Assistant
- Marc Scrivo as Mrs. Edwards' Assistant
- Patrizio Farinacci as Giulietta's Driver
- Moreno Mari as Man Had His Bike Stolen
- Massimo Scarpati as Naples Fruiterer
- Mario Bellini as Restaurant Waiter
- Susanna Giaroli as Disco's Hostess
- Sveva Alviti as Blonde Girl
- Rajae Bezzaz as Blonde Barmaid
- Giulia Sancassani • Ilaria Calza • Genny Silvestrin • Elisa Scheffler as Handmaids
- Yann Grappe • Michail Mauracher • Emile Noharet • Angelo Pezzano • Erick Sangnidjo as French Football Team
- Imperatore Luigi • Maria Tesoro • Gaia Bonfante • Rosaria Bonfante • Fabrizio De Felice as Gypsies

== Production ==
=== Background and writing ===
Robert F. Kennedy III began writing at a young age, winning an award for a screenplay for a film noir in high school: "I was kind of hooked at that point." AmeriQua is the first film derived from a screenplay by Kennedy. It is loosely autobiographical, based on his experiences as a "broke student" in Italy, working various jobs like waiting tables or tending bar to support himself during his study abroad in Bologna in 2005, where he met the "stock of wild characters" who populate the film, and where he "found himself in weird situations." After graduating from Brown University, Kennedy started writing down "ideas, little scenes, bits of dialogue," inspired by living in "this classic dirty student apartment in Italy, with a really intense group of characters coming in and out all the time." He worked briefly for a political website and hosted a fundraiser for President Obama in 2008, but he considered himself first and foremost a writer, writing up to eight hours per day.

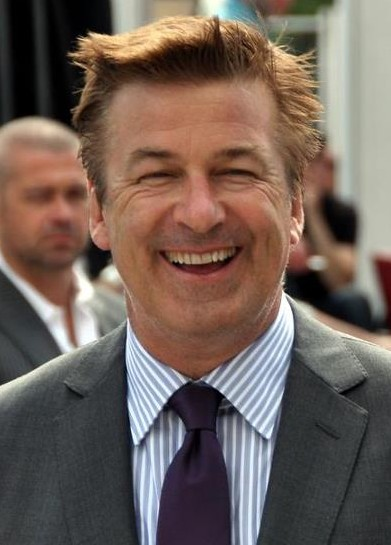
Alec Baldwin at Cannes, 2012

Marco Gualtieri's friendship with the Kennedy family arose following his involvement with the Robert F. Kennedy Center for Justice and Human Rights. The entertainment entrepreneur was also on the board of the Florence-based Robert F. Kennedy Foundation of Europe. In January 2009, while attending a reception as Ethel Kennedy's guest at the Kennedy house in Washington, D.C. celebrating President Obama's second inauguration, he was approached by Bobby Kennedy who spoke to him in Italian, saying he wanted to make a film about his experience and love for Italy: "Bobby … started talking to me about this film, and after 10 minutes I started laughing because he was pitching it to me, when the room was filled with Hollywood heavyweights". Attendees at the reception included director Ron Howard and actors Alec Baldwin and Glenn Close; Gualteri, the founder of the TicketOne concert ticket buying service, had no real connection to the world of filmmaking. After meeting Kennedy's best friend from Italy, Lele Gabellone, Gualtieri was completely won over. Kennedy's love of Italy convinced Gualteri to become the producer for the project.

=== Development and financing ===
Kennedy's original screenplay was in English, but it evolved into a macaronic text in English and Italian, as Bologna mystery writer and collaborator Matteo Bortolotti explained:

I was involved later, and together with Bobby we worked on mixing our styles, our respective insanity, rewriting everything and enjoying ourselves like crazy. The macaronic English of the Italians is a principal component. It's an explosive, ungrammatical, rough comedy and full of stereotypes that we enjoyed playing with.

For the project, Gualteri's Jabadoo SRL received €350,000 in support from the Italian Ministry of Cultural Heritage and Activities, or 10.3% of its projected budget, in the form of an interest-free loan from the Fondo Unitario per lo spettacolo. Private sponsorship came from Fiat and Jaggy.

Cinematographer Marco Bassano commented that the budget was considerably higher than he was used to, noting they had helicopters and "other things", and that in Italy, one is normally limited to one such kind of equipment.

=== Casting and characters ===
Casting began in September 2009. Marco Gualtieri is quoted as saying that, with the exception of the "bad guys", all the other characters are based on real individuals from Kennedy's experience in Bologna. In addition, Kennedy was not the only actor playing a fictional version of himself. Charlie's love interest Vicky is played by fellow New Yorker Eva Amurri, who studied alongside Kennedy in Bologna. Marin Jo Finerty, who plays Vicky's best friend, Elsy, is an American who came to Italy to study at the age of 14, and called her character "a little bit of a bitch" and a precisina. Originally from Lecce, Lele Gabellone was working as a club promoter in Bologna when he met Kennedy at a nightclub and they became best friends. AmeriQua is his film debut, one of a number of non-professional actors who were cast because they shared experiences with Kennedy. The film also marked the debut for model and actress Sveva Alviti.

Badoo (portrayed by Gianluca Bazzoli) is an anarchist who believes in the elimination of both national and international legal frameworks, prisons, religious dogma; his more eccentric notions include the "illumination of only the walk symbols on all city corners, a complete moratorium on personal hygiene, a clothes optional society and, above all, the abolition of money." The character's wardrobe and overall look were inspired by Sid Vicious.

Vito Facciolla, who had played criminals before in non-comedic films, said the directors chose him, Matteo Azchirvani, and Edoardo Pesceas because they worked well together as a trio as Vito and his henchmen, the thick-moustached, confrontational Jaroslav, an "asshole" from an Eastern European country who can barely make himself understood in Neapolitan dialect, and often lapses into a Slavic language, particularly when cursing, and Il Nero, a harmonica-playing rockabilly type and a man of "slow action". Facciolla and Pesceas appreciated how much space they were given and the freedom to improvise. One evening in Bologna, the trio had some time to themselves and, still in costume, were being mistaken by passersby for genuine "shady" characters, so they decided to go to local pubs and bars pretending to ask for protection money, which led to the police being called.

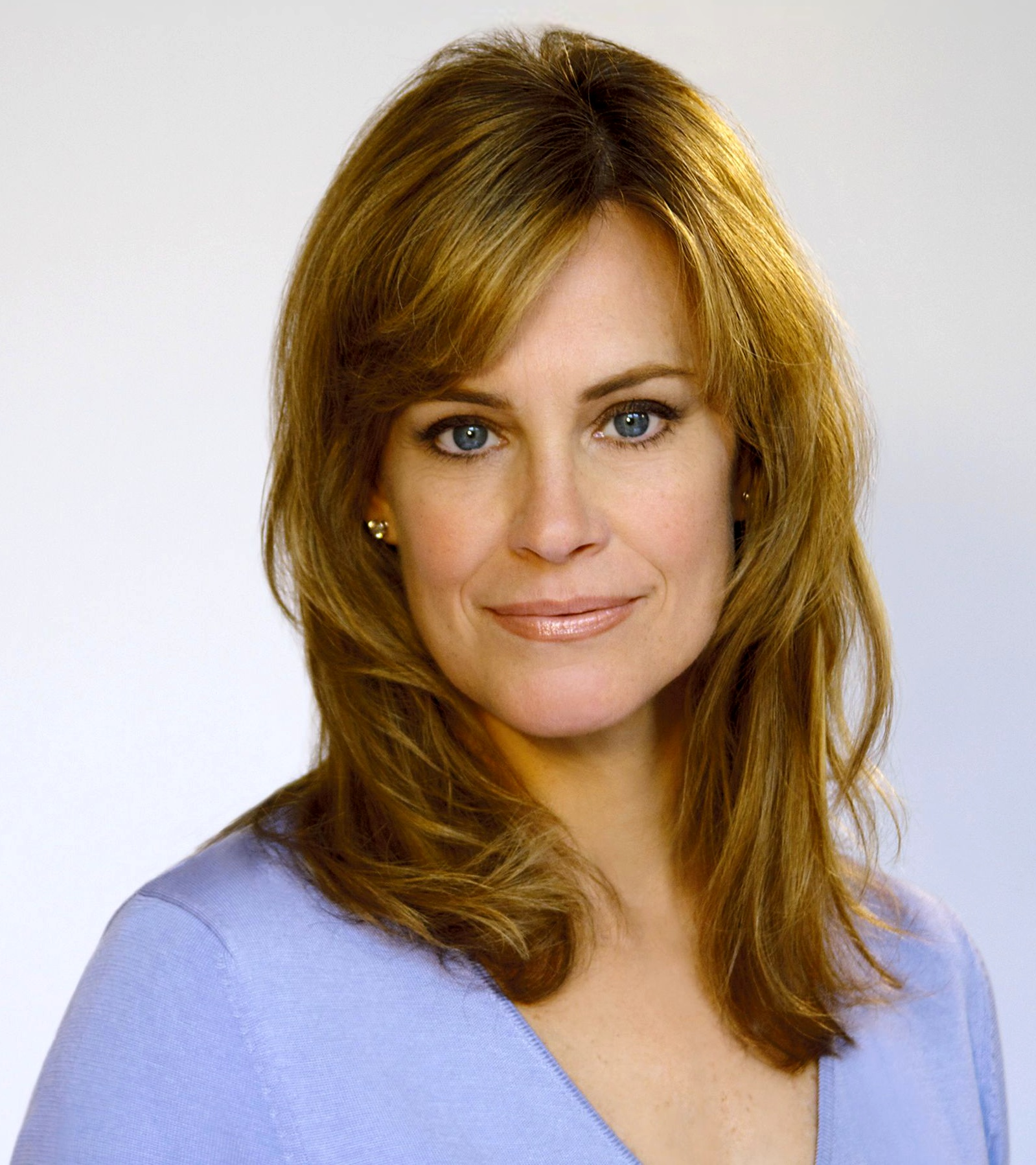
Catherine Mary Stewart in 2011

Michele Bottini, who played Sergio, steward at Don Ferracane's restaurant, was also the film's acting coach; Kennedy and Gabellone spent a few weeks at his house in Varese, where he instructed them on "stage presence, annunciation and spritz drinking".

The film owes Alec Baldwin's cameo appearance to his friendship with Kennedy's father Robert F. Kennedy Jr. Glenn Close was reportedly cast to play his wife and Charlie's mother, the role ultimately going to Catherine Mary Stewart.

=== Set design and props ===
Difficult scenes from a design point of view were Valentina's birthday party, Lele's house, the university dormitory, and the ragù scene, which actually induced nausea among some of the people on set due to the "sickening smell". The scenes on the Alitalia flight were filmed in a flight simulator outside of Fiumicino Airport in Rome, and required cutting out cloud forms to pass by the windows, giving the impression from within the aircraft of passing clouds.

=== Filming ===
AmeriQua was shot on 35mm. The directors' previous experience was in television, working for MTV. Principal photography was originally expected to begin in Italy in Spring 2010, but did not start until 27 August, in the city of Barga, where the helicopters were used for shots around the Duomo. The production then moved to Bologna, where most of the film's scenes were shot. The nightclub scene was filmed in the same one where Kennedy and Gabellone met. The next scenes were shot in Naples (including the Città della Scienza before it was destroyed in a fire) and Rome, after which, after about fifty days of shooting, the production returned to Barga once more, finishing shooting there on 17 October before the final leg of filming began a few weeks later in New York City.

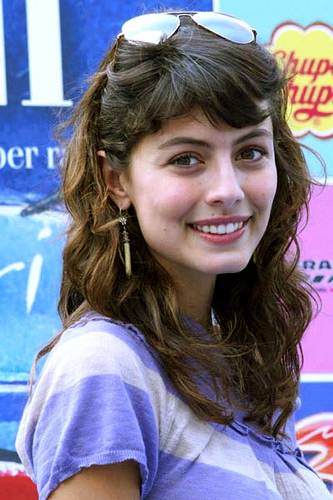
Alessandra Mastronardi in 2008

The final scene to be filmed, which happens to be the opening scene of the film itself, the exterior of Wagner College, was shot in early December in freezing temperatures, whereas the action is supposed to be taking place in July, with the actors in T-shirts; post-production CGI would be used to add leaves to the trees. Scenes set in the US which did not have to be filmed on location were filmed in Italy, for example, those with Alberto Tonti.

Alessandra Mastronardi was skeptical about Kennedy's novice acting skills until she saw him work, and realised that as the writer and protagonist, there could be no one better to play the part and Kennedy had a flair for comedy; moreover, he was flexible, rewriting the script to make the film more fun, so often, she called AmeriQua a "work in progress". Kennedy was also very open to improvisation. During Mastronardi's first scenes under the arches of the Piazza Maggiore, with dogs, Kennedy had an idea to stuff hot dog meat in the actors' shoes so the dogs would follow them around, but, according to Mastronardi, he put too much in his own shoe, and sometimes tripped over the dogs. During a day of heavy rain which inundated Bologna, Kennedy and the directors had to reimagine a scene that would otherwise have been very difficult to shoot; the result is the scene of Kennedy and Mastronardi dancing in a church. On another occasion, Kennedy had to rewrite a scene just minutes before shooting began. Unable to drive a scooter, a stand-in was filmed for the scenes of her character driving one in the hills above Bologna. Kennedy was very nervous before filming his kiss with Mastronardi in Piazza Santo Stefano, and invited her to a bar where they and the directors each drank a shot, "so when we shot the scene we were slightly tipsy".

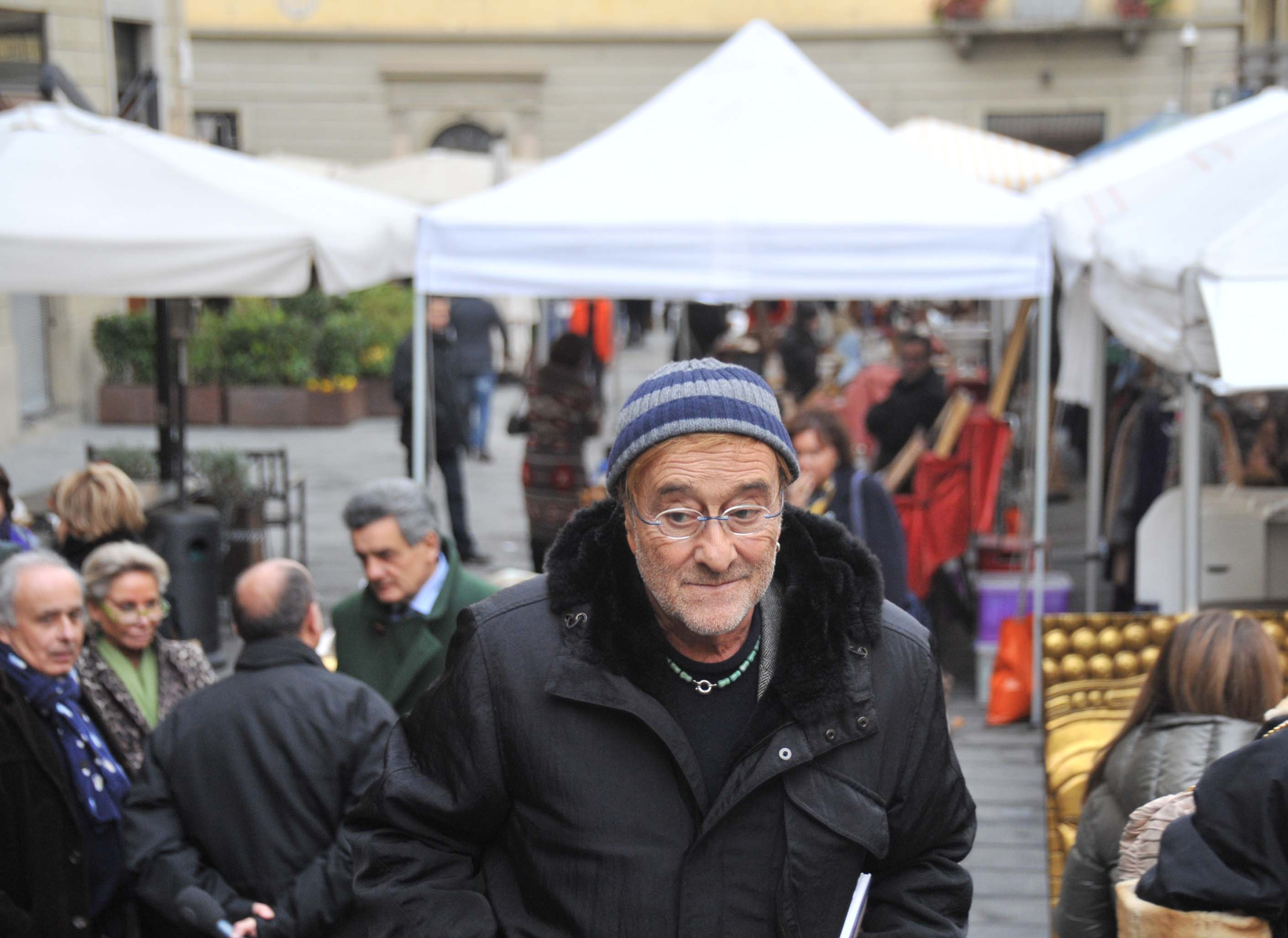
Lucio Dalla at the Antique Fair in Arezzo, 2011

=== Music ===
Singer and songwriter Lucio Dalla composed the original score for the film. In 2011, Gualtieri, Kennedy, and Gabellone approached Dalla, and the Bologna musician said yes almost immediately. In March 2013, a year after Dalla's 2012 death, Kennedy recalled how they spent "wonderful" days at Dalla's home in the Tremiti, and described Dalla as a generous man who always supported young artists, like Marco Sbarbati, whom he discovered, and whose single "I Don't Wanna Start" is included in the film.

=== Marketing and related works ===
The production blog's hundreds of posts finally had more minutes of video than AmeriQua itself. Nearly all of the video was taken by Sacha Cesana, and then edited by Simona Ruggeri, and eventually posted on YouTube.

In the US, Alec Baldwin promoted the film in an appearance on Late Show with David Letterman on 25 February 2013.

== Release ==
AmeriQua had its world premiere in Berlin, Germany, on 10 and 14 February 2012. The Italian premiere took place more than a year later at a red carpet event in Milan on 14 March 2013. The film opened in theatres across Italy on 16 May 2013. the American premiere expected to follow in July.

=== Home media ===
AmeriQua was released on DVD under the title EuroTrapped by Screen Media on 17 September 2013, described on DiscDish as "a strange little English-language production from Italy... with a lot of money behind it". Screen Media also released it on Blu-ray on 9 December 2015.

=== Streaming ===
As Eurotrapped, the film was available for streaming on Netflix until October 2015. The film is available on Amazon Prime and iTunes, also as EuroTrapped.

== Reception ==
=== Commercial performance ===
AmeriQua did very poorly following its opening weekend in Italy, which saw the film take €23,134, the bulk of its final gross, €26,500.

=== Critical response ===
The review aggregator on the Italian website MyMovies.it assigns a rating of 2.28/5 for AmeriQua based on fifteen reviews and other notices.

While it was evident that the filmmakers had very good intentions, for Alessandro Antinori, the film is disappointingly "amateurish", the product of a rough script and banal dialogue, particularly as delivered by the non-professional protagonists, Kennedy and Gabellone, and the Italian dubbing was even more embarrassing. Comparing the film unfavourably to L'Auberge espagnole, whose director Cédric Klapisch also draws on his student experience in a foreign country, Antinori argues that AmeriQua fails to achieve its primary objective of getting past American stereotypical perceptions of Italians. Assigning it a rating of 3/10, Giancarlo Usai goes further: the film is an unforgivable attempt to overturn Italian cinepanettone stereotypes with a sloppy nonsensical script consisting of a series of poorly paced, disconnected sketches.

Massimo Bertarelli opines that the film is a bizarre and weird comedy, but at the same time a feel-good and almost "polite" story. Giorgio Carbone called the film a sincere light comedy: while Kennedy is no Marlon Brando, he is assuredly better than Nicolas Vaporidis. Eugenia Paolucci felt there were too many clichés in the film, but she still called AmeriQua a tender portrait of the nation, and one sympathetic reviewer called the film "hilarious".
