= CounterPunch (film) =

2017 documentary film

- Directed by: Jay Bulger
- Written by: Jay Bulger
- Starring: Oscar De La Hoya; David Diamante; Bernard Hopkins
- Distributed by: Netflix
- Release date: June 16, 2017
- Running time: 91 minutes
- Country: United States
- Languages: English; Spanish

CounterPunch is a 2017 American documentary film directed by Jay Bulger following three boxers at different stages of their careers, chasing their goals of becoming champions.

The film was released by Netflix on June 6, 2017.

== Premise ==
The film is a documentary about boxing, covering both the good and the bad aspects of the sport, and follows the personal growth and development of its main characters, Chis "Lil B Hop" Colbert, Cam F. Awesome, and Peter "Kid Chocolate" Quillan. The film also features commentary from established boxers like Sugar Ray Leonard, Oscar De La Hoya, Paulie Malignaggi and others.

== Cast ==
- Oscar De La Hoya
- David Diamante
- Bernard Hopkins
- Sugar Ray Leonard
- Paulie Malignaggi
- Michael Woods
- Chris "Lil B Hop" Colbert
- Cam F. Awesome
- Peter "Kid Chocolate" Quillan
