= Andrew Karsch =

American film producer

Andrew Karsch is an American film producer involved in motion pictures, politics and technology.

== Biography ==
=== Film ===
Andrew Karsch attended The American Film Institute Center for Advanced Film Studies, where, as a Conservatory Fellow, he produced the highly acclaimed Nights at O’Rear's, which premiered at The New York Film Festival in 1981.

He subsequently founded Longfellow Pictures while working as both a producer and executive with United Artists from 1985 to 1994.

Karsch left United Artists to run companies and continue producing under his Longfellow Pictures banner first with William Randolph Hearst III and then Sidney Kimmel.

In 2010, Karsch founded the company Insurgent Media, which has produced several documentaries including the SXSW award-winning Beware of Mr. Baker; Blank City, about underground film, music and art in 1970s New York; the Emmy nominated American Masters Woody Allen: A Documentary; PBS' Before the Spring, After The Fall; and the Netflix Original Mission Blue.

Karsch also executive produced the Berlin Film Festival Cinema Fairbindet prize-winning film Art/Violence.

His credits include Academy Award-nominated The Prince of Tides, The Emperor’s Club, Princess Caraboo, The Rachel Papers, Conviction, and the 2012 Academy Award-nominated Moneyball.

Karsch was executive producer on the film Moynihan, released October 3, 2018. At that time he was also concluding post-production on A Hundred Camels in the Courtyard, his feature documentary examining and in many instances replicating a trip taken by then composer Paul Bowles across Morocco over half a century ago both recording the music and observing the customs of the more remote and exotic tribes throughout the country.

=== Politics ===
Karsch served as Co-Director of Senator Edward M. Kennedy's 1976 Massachusetts Senate reelection campaign and again worked with Senator Kennedy as Director of Issues and Media for his 1980 Presidential campaign.

In 2008 working with Rock the Vote, he conceived and organized the largest youth voter registration drive to date, optimizing new online platforms to register 2.6mm first time voters principally between the ages of 18 and 35.

In 2012 working with The Culture Project, Karsch produced and co-wrote the critically acclaimed Blueprint For Accountability, which was presented at the NYU Skirball Center and broadcast live online around the world by FORA. Panelists included Valerie Plame Wilson, Jeremy Scahill, Ron Suskind, General Ricardo Sanchez, Vince Warren, Rose Styron and Robert F. Kennedy Jr.

=== Technology ===
In 2006, Karsch founded outside.in with partners Fred Wilson, Steven Johnson, and Mark Bailey which was subsequently purchased by AOL in 2011.

He was also a founding partner of someecards created by Brook Lundy and Duncan Mitchell in 2007.

=== Current ===
Karsch continues to consult with numerous foundations, organizations and institutions while serving as a Senior Advisor to the Robert F. Kennedy Memorial.

== Filmography ==
- A Hundred Camel's in the Courtyard (2018; producer)
- Moynihan (2018; executive producer)
- The Wilde Wedding (2017; producer)
- Mission Blue (2014; executive producer)
- Before the Spring: After the Fall (2013; executive producer)
- Art/Violence (2013; executive producer)
- Woody Allen: A Documentary (2012; executive producer)
- Beware of Mr. Baker (2012; producer)
- Moneyball (2011; executive producer)
- Conviction (2010; producer)
- Blank City (2010; executive producer)
- Slow Burn (2005; executive producer)
- The Emperor’s Club (2002; producer)
- Separation Anxiety (2002; executive producer)
- The Perfect You (2002; producer)
- Town & Country (2001; producer)
- Lisa Picard Is Famous (2000; executive producer)
- Curtain Call (1998; producer and story)
- Rough Magic (1995; executive producer)
- Princess Caraboo (1994; producer)
- The Prince of Tides (1991; producer)
- The Rachel Papers (1989; producer)
- Stars Above the City (1982; producer and co-writer)
- Nights at O'Rear's (1980; producer)
