= Alessandra Mastronardi =

Italian actress (born 1986)

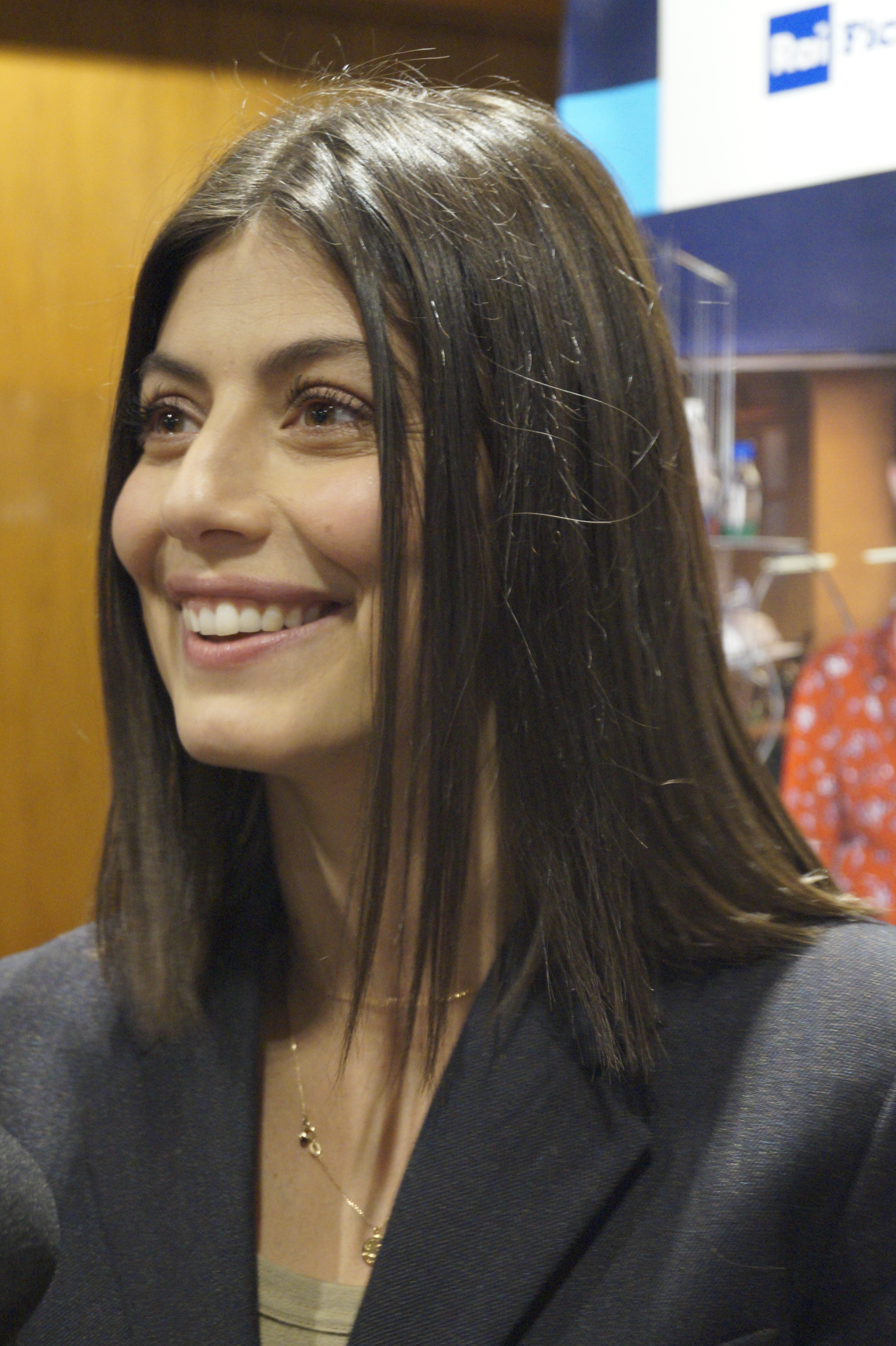
- Mastronardi in 2018
- Born: Alessandra Carina Mastronardi; February 18, 1986 (age 40); Naples, Italy
- Occupation: Actress
- Years active: 1997–present

Alessandra Carina Mastronardi (born February 18, 1986) is an Italian actress. She is best known for her roles in the films To Rome with Love (2012) and The Unbearable Weight of Massive Talent (2022), and the television series Master of None, for which she garnered a nomination for the Critics' Choice Television Award for Best Supporting Actress in a Comedy Series in 2017.

== Early life ==
Alessandra was born in Naples, Campania, Italy, to a father from Agnone, in the province of Isernia and a mother from Naples, but was brought up in Rome after moving there at the age of five. She attended a Classical Lyceum and then the Sapienza University of Rome where she studied performing arts. Previously she had attended a psychology course at the same institution.

== Career ==
She made her debut as an actress in 1997, in the miniseries Un prete tra noi, followed by Amico mio 2 (1998), directed by Paolo Poeti, Lui e lei 2 (1999), Il veterinario, by José María Sánchez, and Il grande Torino with Remo Girone and Michele Placido, directed by Claudio Bonivento, in which she pictures the character of Rosa Di Girolamo, both filmed in 2005, and an episode of Don Matteo 5 (2006). She also had some roles in different films : Il manoscritto di Van Hecken (1999) and The Beast in the Heart (2003); moreover some short subjects make part of her range of performances Cose che si dicono al buio, by Marco Costa, and Due sigarette, both filmed in (2004).

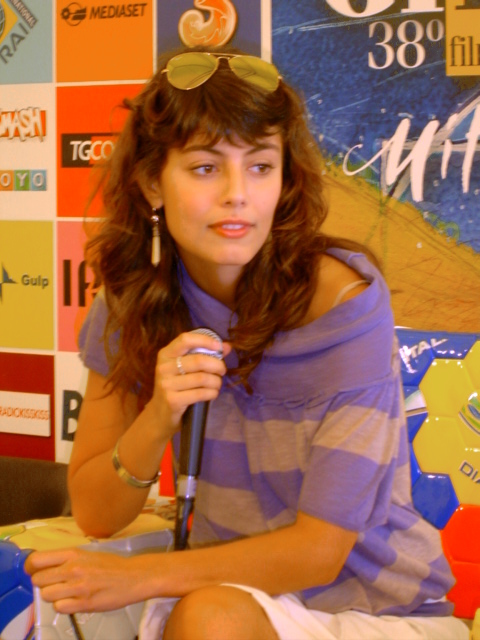
Mastronardi in 2008

Mastronardi gained more fame, mainly in Italy, when she became a regular cast member of the 2006 Italian version of the TV series Los Serrano, I Cesaroni, in which she plays the part of the young shy and romantic girl Eva Cudicini. In 2006, she was the main character, together with Matteo Branciamore, in the music video Stai bene come stai, performed by the Italian musical group Le Mani.

On January 16, 2007 she made her theatre debut in the comedy The Prozac Family, directed by Marco Costa. She portrayed the character of Margherita, while the role of her fiancé Mamo was played by Eros Galbiati, who became popular in Italy in 2006 thanks to the movie Notte prima degli esami. On August 24, 2007 the movie Prova a volare by Lorenzo Cicconi Massi was released. She acted with Riccardo Scamarcio, portraying the role of Gloria. In February 2008 she returned to TV with the second season of I Cesaroni, still directed by Francesco Vicario. Then she appeared in the miniseries Romanzo criminale – La serie, by Stefano Sollima, a remake of the 2005 movie Romanzo criminale.

In January, 2009, the third season of I Cesaroni began. Subsequently, Alessandra obtained an important role in TV film Non smettere di sognare, in which she played the part of a young dancer, Stella. Mastronardi played Milly, a young bride and astronomy teacher, in the 2012 Woody Allen movie, To Rome with Love.

In 2017, she appeared as the character of Francesca in Season 2 of Netflix's Master of None. In 2018, she played the witch Gelica in the movie Ötzi and the mystery of time. In 2019, she appeared in the role of Lucrezia Donati in the Netflix show Medici: Masters of Florence. In 2022, she appeared in the Lionsgate movie The Unbearable Weight of Massive Talent with Nicolas Cage.

Mastronardi's first video game role came in 2024's Indiana Jones and the Great Circle where she played Italian investigative journalist Ginetta "Gina" Lombardi. A review by Wired praised Mastronardi's performance as Gina as being "fiery enough to rival Marion Ravenwood as Indy's leading lady".

== Filmography ==
=== Film ===
| Year | Title | Role | Notes |
|---|---|---|---|
| 1999 | Il manoscritto di Van Hecken | Anna | |
| 2005 | The Beast in the Heart | Shopper | Cameo |
| 2007 | Prova a volare | Gloria | |
| 2012 | To Rome with Love | Milly | Nominated Nastro d'Argento – Best Supporting Actress |
| 2013 | AmeriQua | Valentina | |
| 2013 | The Fifth Wheel | Angela | |
| 2014 | Amici come noi | Rosa | |
| 2014 | Ogni maledetto Natale | Giulia Colardo | |
| 2015 | Life | Annamaria Pierangeli | |
| 2017 | Lost in Florence | Stefania | |
| 2017 | Titanium White | Silvia | |
| 2018 | Ötzi and the Mystery of Time | Gelica | |
| 2019 | L'agenzia dei bugiardi | Clio | |
| 2020 | About Us | Annie | |
| 2020 | Si muore solo da vivi | Chiara | |
| 2021 | La donna per me | Laura | |
| 2022 | The Unbearable Weight of Massive Talent | Gabriela Lucchesi | |
| 2022 | Con chi viaggi | Anna | |
| 2022 | Altrimenti ci arrabbiamo | Miriam | |
| 2025 | Elio | Olga Solís (voice) | Italian dub |

=== Television ===
| Year | Title | Role | Notes |
|---|---|---|---|
| 1999 | Un prete tra noi | Barbara | Episode: "Per troppo amore" |
| 2001 | Un medico in famiglia | Claudia | Episode: "Contratti" |
| 2005 | Il Grande Torino | Rosa Di Girolamo | Miniseries |
| 2006 | Don Matteo | Vanessa's daughter | Episode: "Il ballo delle debuttanti" |
| 2006–2012 | I Cesaroni | Eva Cudicini | Main role (seasons 1–4); recurring role (season 5); 105 episodes |
| 2008–2010 | Romanzo criminale - La serie | Roberta | Main role (season 1); recurring role (season 2); 14 episodes |
| 2009 | Non smettere di sognare | Stella Carossi | Television film |
| 2010 | Pius XII: Under the Roman Sky | Miriam | Television film |
| 2011 | Atelier Fontana - Le sorelle della moda | Micol Fontana | Miniseries |
| 2012 | Titanic: Blood and Steel | Sofia Silvestri | Main role; 12 episodes |
| 2014 | Romeo e Giulietta | Giulietta | Miniseries |
| 2016–2020 | L'allieva | Alice Allevi | Lead role; 35 episodes |
| 2017 | C'era una volta Studio Uno | Giulia Martini | Miniseries |
| 2017 | Master of None | Francesca | Main role (season 2); 5 episodes |
| 2018–2019 | Medici | Lucrezia Donati | Main role; 16 episodes |
| 2021 | Carla | Carla Fracci | Television film |
| 2023 | Drag Race Italia | Herself | Episode: "Walk of Fame" |
| 2023 | One trillion dollars | Franca Vacchi | Main Role; 6 episodes |
| 2025 | Doppio gioco | Daria Giraldi | Miniseries |

=== Music videos ===
| Year | Title | Artist(s) |
|---|---|---|
| 2007 | "Stai bene come stai" | Le Mani |
| 2009 | "Il mio riflesso" | Tormento |
| 2009 | "Parole nuove" | Matteo Branciamore |
| 2010 | "Roberta" | Il Genio |
| 2017 | "Dobbiamo fare luce" | Gianni Morandi |
| 2019 | "What More Can I Do?" | Jack Savoretti |

=== Video games ===
| Year | Title | Role | Notes | Ref. |
|---|---|---|---|---|
| 2024 | Indiana Jones and the Great Circle | Gina Lombardi | | |
