= Jay Bulger =

American film director

- Born: August 19, 1982 (age 44)
- Education: Fordham University
- Occupation: Film director

Jay Bulger (born August 19, 1982) is an American film director and writer from Washington, D.C.

== Biography ==
Bulger attended Fordham University in the Bronx, where he boxed in several New York Golden Glove tournaments. Photographs of his fighting launched him onto the cover of Vogue and then modelling for brands such as Armani, Calvin Klein, Dolce & Gabbana, Kenneth Cole, and Hermès.

He has directed music videos for bands such as The Hold Steady, Nightmare of You, Permanent Me, and Playradioplay, and commercials for brands such as Pepsi and Disney.

Bulger wrote an article for Rolling Stone entitled "The Devil and Ginger Baker", which became the premise for his documentary Beware of Mr. Baker. In the spring of 2010, Bulger returned to South Africa with a small film crew to finish making the film. Beware of Mr. Baker premiered at the 2012 South by Southwest Film Festival and won the Grand Jury Prize for Best Documentary.

In 2018, Bulger played the lead role of Hunter S. Thompson in the film Fear and Loathing in Aspen by Bobby Kennedy III.

In 2017, Bulger directed the Netflix documentary feature Counterpunch, which premiered on June 16, 2017 and chronicles the trials and triumphs of three promising boxers navigating a sport in decline.

Bulger is also the founder and Executive Director of the nonprofit boxing gym Bronx Legends in the South Bronx, which he opened to provide youth with community, discipline and an alternative to street violence.
