= Amaryllis Fox Kennedy =

American writer and former CIA officer (born 1980)

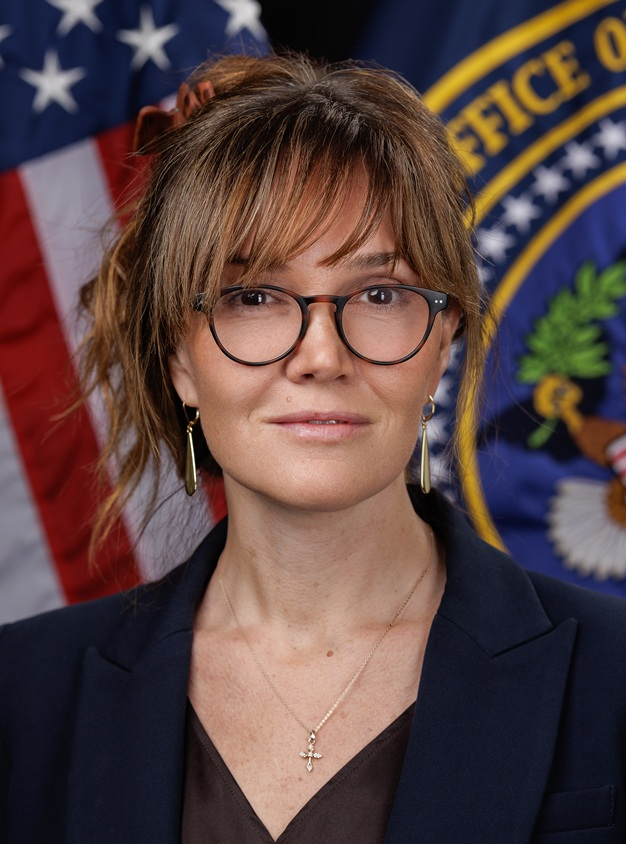
- Official portrait, 2025

Deputy Director of National Intelligence for Policy and Capabilities
- In office July 30, 2025 – May 2026
- President: Donald Trump
- Preceded by: Charles Luftig
- Succeeded by: Allison Curran

Associate Director of the Office of Management and Budget for Intelligence and International Affairs
- In office February 11, 2025 – May 2026
- President: Donald Trump
- Preceded by: Steven Kosiak

Personal details
- Born: Amaryllis Damerell Thornber; September 22, 1980 (age 46) New York City, New York, U.S.
- Spouses: Dean Fox (divorced); Robert F. Kennedy III (m. 2018)
- Children: 3
- Relatives: Kennedy family (by marriage); Steven Rales (stepfather)
- Education: University of Oxford (BA); Georgetown University (MA)

Amaryllis Fox Kennedy (born Amaryllis Damerell Thornber; September 22, 1980) is an American former Central Intelligence Agency officer, government official, campaign manager, tech entrepreneur, and writer serving from 2025 to 2026 in various positions in the Trump administration, including at the United States Intelligence Community and the White House.

Kennedy was the Deputy Director of National Intelligence for Policy and Capabilities and Associate Director for Intelligence and International Affairs at the Office of Management and Budget (OMB). She is also a member of President Donald Trump's Intelligence Advisory Board (PIAB). She served in the CIA from 2002 to 2010.

Kennedy wrote a memoir about her time in the CIA, Life Undercover: Coming of Age in the CIA, published by Knopf Doubleday in 2019. She hosted the six-episode Netflix documentary series The Business of Drugs, released in 2020. She was a campaign manager for her father-in-law Robert F. Kennedy Jr.'s 2024 independent presidential campaign.

== Early life ==
Amaryllis Fox Kennedy was born in New York City as Amaryllis Damerell Thornber. Her mother, Lalage Damerell, is a retired English actress. Her father, Hodson Thornber, was an economist. Her mother has since married businessman and film producer Steven Rales. When Fox Kennedy was eight years old, her friend Laura died in the bombing of Pan Am Flight 103 over Lockerbie, Scotland. She said of the event in an interview, "I remember being very, very overwhelmed by the loss and my dad intervened and said, 'you have to understand the forces that took her or they will drown you'." She has said the moment catalyzed her increased awareness of current events and geopolitical conditions.

Growing up in Washington, D.C. and London, Fox Kennedy attended the National Cathedral School beginning in eighth grade and graduated in 1998; she attended The American School in London during tenth grade. She completed undergraduate studies at the University of Oxford in 2002. She has said that while at Oxford, she rebuffed approaches from the Secret Intelligence Service. Before Fox Kennedy's last year at Oxford, the September 11 attacks took place while she was visiting family in Washington, D.C.; subsequently, she decided to pursue a master's degree in conflict and terrorism at the Walsh School of Foreign Service. For her master's thesis, Fox Kennedy developed an algorithm intended to identify local terrorist safe havens, which attracted the CIA's attention.

== Career ==
=== Interview with Aung Sang Suu Kyi ===
In 1999, at age 18, Fox Kennedy clandestinely recorded an interview for the BBC with the Burmese leader Aung San Suu Kyi, then under house arrest. To arrange the meeting, Fox Kennedy worked with a local dissident journalist with whom she communicated via taped messages inside the water tank of a toilet at a café in Rangoon. Her intent in the trip had been to make a secret recording of planned pro-democracy protests on September 9. A book, In the Quiet Land, was set to be published in 2002, with film rights optioned to Golden Square Pictures and screenplay by Nick Thomas.

=== Central Intelligence Agency ===
Fox Kennedy became one of the CIA's youngest female officers at age 22, assigned to "non-official cover", entailing living abroad with a fake identity and no diplomatic protection. She has said she assumed the cover of an art dealer and focused on preventing terror organizations from acquiring weapons of mass destruction. After eight years at the agency, Fox Kennedy left the CIA in 2010.

=== Tech and entrepreneurial career ===
In 2012, Fox Kennedy founded Mulu, a social commerce platform that enabled users to share product recommendations and direct a percentage of affiliate proceeds to either themselves or a charity of their choice. That year, Mulu was featured in Mashable's list of "10 Hot Startups Changing the Face of Retail".

In 2014, Fox Kennedy joined Twitter as a product manager of its global e-commerce team. During her tenure, she worked on initiatives such as "Products and Places", a feature that allowed users to explore collections of goods and services curated by brands, celebrities, and media outlets. These efforts were part of Twitter's early experiments with in-platform shopping, including the "Buy Button" pilot program. She left the company in 2015.

=== Television and public speaking ===
Fox Kennedy hosts the Netflix documentary series The Business of Drugs, for which she traveled to several countries while in the third trimester of pregnancy. The show investigates the supply chains, social effects, and legal issues specific to six types of drugs: cocaine, synthetics, heroin, methamphetamine, opioids, and cannabis. She speaks at events around the world on dialogue and peacekeeping. Apple is reportedly developing a TV series based on Fox Kennedy's memoir that will star Brie Larson, with Fox serving as an executive producer.

=== Robert F. Kennedy Jr.'s campaign manager ===
In April 2023, Fox Kennedy joined the presidential campaign of Robert F. Kennedy Jr. (her father-in-law) as the co-campaign manager, along with Dennis Kucinich. On October 13, 2023, upon Kucinich's resignation, Fox Kennedy became the sole manager of the campaign.

=== Political and public service appointments ===
On February 11, 2025, Kennedy was appointed to serve as a member of Donald Trump's Intelligence Advisory Board (PIAB). On February 21, she was appointed as the Office of Management and Budget's Associate Director for Intelligence and International Affairs. She later assumed the role of Deputy Director of National Intelligence for Policy and Capabilities.

Kennedy resigned from her positions in May 2026. Sources familiar with the matter said her decision was partly influenced by disagreement over the administration's military policy toward Iran, but her resignation letter cited personal and family reasons. By July, she had joined lobbying firm Ballard Partners, to lead its tech and AI practice group.

== Personal life ==
While living undercover in Shanghai, Fox Kennedy married a fellow CIA officer, Dean Fox. The couple had a daughter, and later divorced.

Later, after leaving the agency, Fox Kennedy was introduced at Burning Man to Robert F. Kennedy III, Robert F. Kennedy Jr.'s eldest son and a grandson of Robert F. Kennedy, via a mutual friend. The two married on Cape Cod in 2018, and have two children together.

Fox Kennedy's stepfather is Steven Rales, a Hollywood mogul and billionaire, who owns the media distribution companies Janus Films and The Criterion Collection. He also holds a 20% stake in the Indiana Pacers of the National Basketball Association.

Fox Kennedy's memoir, Life Undercover: Coming of Age in the CIA, describes her experiences as an officer. Before its release, some former CIA officers took issue with her manuscript being submitted to publisher Knopf Doubleday without first being approved by the CIA's Publication Review Board, a potential violation of nondisclosure agreements that CIA staff sign. Attorney Mark Zaid represented Fox Kennedy in that process. Some former CIA case officers have expressed skepticism about elements of Fox Kennedy's accounts of events or raised questions about the circumvention of the CIA's approval process. Fox Kennedy has responded that she took care not to reveal potentially sensitive details, and that some characters are composites.
