= Robert F. Kennedy III =

American director and screenwriter (born 1984)

- Born: Robert Francis Kennedy III; September 2, 1984 (age 42); Mount Kisco, New York, U.S.
- Other name: Bobby Kennedy III
- Education: Brown University
- Occupations: Director; screenwriter
- Years active: 2012–present
- Spouse: Amaryllis Fox (m. 2018)
- Children: 2
- Father: Robert F. Kennedy Jr.
- Relatives: Kennedy family

Robert Francis "Bobby" Kennedy III (born September 2, 1984) is an American director and screenwriter. He is the oldest son of Robert F. Kennedy Jr. and a grandson of Robert F. Kennedy, as well as a member of the prominent Kennedy family.

== Early life and education ==
Robert Francis Kennedy III was born on September 2, 1984 to Robert F. Kennedy Jr. and Emily Black at the Northern Westchester Hospital in Mount Kisco, New York. Kennedy was given the nickname "Bobby" growing up. He was kept out of public view growing up. Kennedy later graduated from Brown University in Providence, Rhode Island.

In 2000, Kennedy accompanied his father at the Democratic National Convention. In 2008, he helped then senator Barack Obama to launch the website Ameritocracy.com, a fundraiser, which has become defunct.

== Career ==
Kennedy created a film noir titled Battle for Aspen in high school, and later won an award there for the film. In 2011, he began working on his first film, titled The Velvet Mafia. However it was later cancelled. He first directed and wrote on ELEW: Live from Infinity, a comedic play, in 2012. In 2013, Kennedy wrote and later acted in the Italian film AmeriQua. The film was derived from his previous screenplays, and was based on his studies in Italy.

In 2016, Shout! Studios acquired the film distribution rights for a film by Kennedy. He landed a $300,000 deal to shoot a film based on journalist Hunter S. Thompson in Colorado, where in 2021, he wrote and directed the film, which was retitled Fear and Loathing in Aspen. It starred his step-mother Cheryl Hines.

The Confessions of Anthony Fauci, his satirical novel about former director of National Institute of Allergy and Infectious Diseases Anthony Fauci, was released in 2025 by Skyhorse Publishing.

== Personal life ==
As of 2016, Kennedy resides in Los Angeles. In 2014, he met Amaryllis Fox at Burning Man in Nevada. They married in July 2018, after dating for a year in Hyannis Port, Massachusetts. They have two children, a daughter born in 2019, and a son born in 2021.

== Bibliography ==
- Kennedy, Robert III (November 18, 2025). The Confessions of Anthony Fauci. MAHA Books. ISBN 978-1-631-44086-1.
